= United States bids for the Olympic Games =

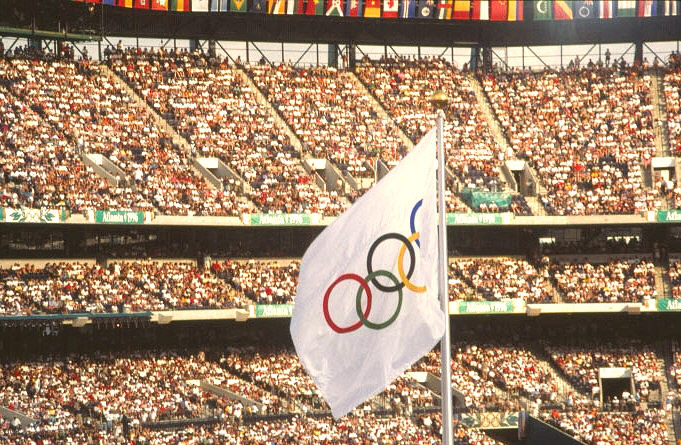
The Olympic flag flies at the Atlanta Olympic Stadium during the 1996 Summer Olympics in Atlanta.

Cities in the United States have participated in the bidding to host 22 Summer Olympics and 14 Winter Olympics, more than any other country. Before 1955, multiple cities from a country could bid for the same Olympic Games. Since 1955, the United States Olympic & Paralympic Committee (USOPC, formerly USOC) has been responsible for choosing one candidate city that may bid for each edition of the Olympic Games, often requiring U.S. cities to bid against each other for the opportunity to submit a bid to the International Olympic Committee (IOC).

Before the USOC took responsibility for nominating cities, the United States was awarded hosting duties for the Summer Olympics twice, in Chicago (later moved to St. Louis) in 1904 and Los Angeles in 1932, and for the 1932 Winter Olympics in Lake Placid, New York. In some years, several American cities competed against one another for the IOC's approval and none of them received it, provoking the USOC to intervene.

For the Summer Olympics, the USOC nominated Detroit's bids four times in a row for the Games from 1960 through 1972. It then supported Los Angeles' bids for 1976 and 1980, before the city was successfully awarded the 1984 Summer Olympics. The USOC's next nominee, the Atlanta bid for the 1996 Summer Olympics, succeeded on the first try. The NYC 2012 and Chicago 2016 bids failed, while the Los Angeles bid for 2024 led to the city being awarded the 2028 Summer Olympics without competition.

For the Winter Olympics, the USOC's first nominee was successful, the candidacy of Olympic Valley, California, for 1960. The committee later unsuccessfully nominated Lake Placid's bid for 1968 and Salt Lake City's bid for 1972 before Denver, Colorado, was awarded the 1976 Winter Olympics (and later withdrew from its hosting duties). Lake Placid was subsequently awarded the 1980 Winter Olympics by default. Anchorage, Alaska, was the nominee for 1992 and 1994. The USOC returned its endorsement to Salt Lake City for 1998, and it was awarded the 2002 Winter Olympics. The next American nominee for the Winter Olympics was Salt Lake City again, and it was awarded the 2034 Winter Olympics.

== Summer Olympics ==
=== 1904 ===
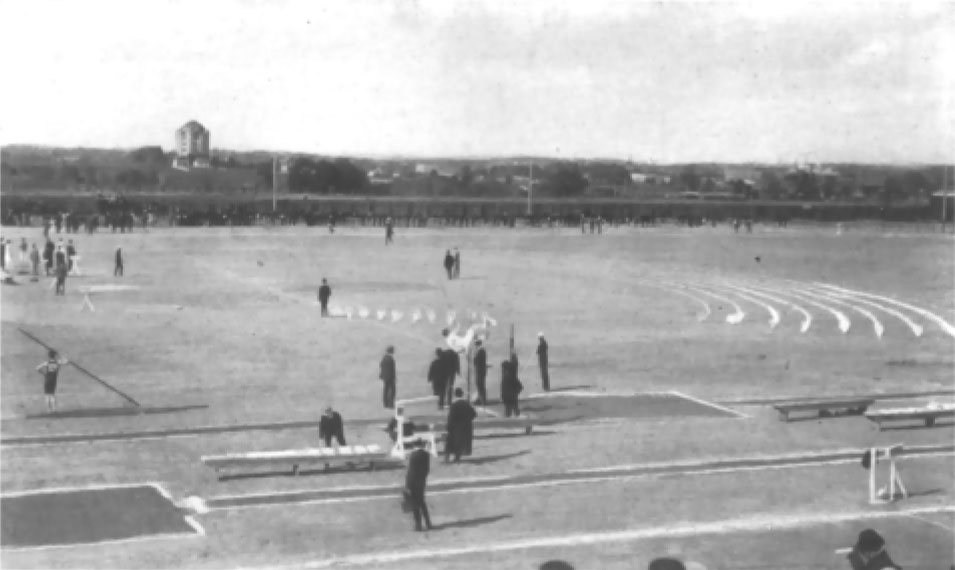
Francis Field during the 1904 Summer Olympics in St. Louis.

After the first two editions of the Olympic Games were awarded to Athens and Paris, the IOC's first open bidding process was held for the 1904 Olympics at the 4th IOC Session in Paris in May 1901. Chicago civic leaders, including University of Chicago president William Rainey Harper, formed the International Olympian Games Association in February 1901 to plan for hosting the Olympics. Shortly before the session began, another American bid was submitted from St. Louis, which was then preparing to host the 1903 World's Fair. At the session, representatives of Chicago offered to put $100,000 (equivalent to $3,870,000 in 2025) toward the games. Unable to compete with this, all other countries withdrew their bids before the IOC voted; cities which had previously expressed interest in the 1904 games included Berlin, Copenhagen, and Stockholm. The IOC delegates then voted between the choices of Chicago and St. Louis, with Chicago winning unanimously on May 21.

However, after St. Louis was forced to postpone its World's Fair from 1903 to 1904, it began planning athletic events that would compete directly with the Olympics in Chicago. The Amateur Athletic Union favored St. Louis and planned to hold its national championships at the World's Fair. In the meantime, Chicago's plans for a new stadium on the shore of Lake Michigan seating 75,000 met considerable opposition from local leaders, including Aaron Montgomery Ward, putting the centerpiece of Chicago's Olympic bid into question. On December 23, 1902, fearing that the dispute would permanently damage the Olympic movement, the IOC asked its members to approve, by a postal vote, the transfer of the Olympic Games to St. Louis. When the votes were tallied, IOC founder Pierre de Coubertin telegraphed the Chicago committee on February 10, 1903, to inform them that the Games had been moved.

The resulting Games of the III Olympiad in St. Louis were overshadowed by the World's Fair, with events spread out across several months, and nearly 90 percent of participating athletes came from North America because of difficulties in traveling from Europe.

=== 1916 ===
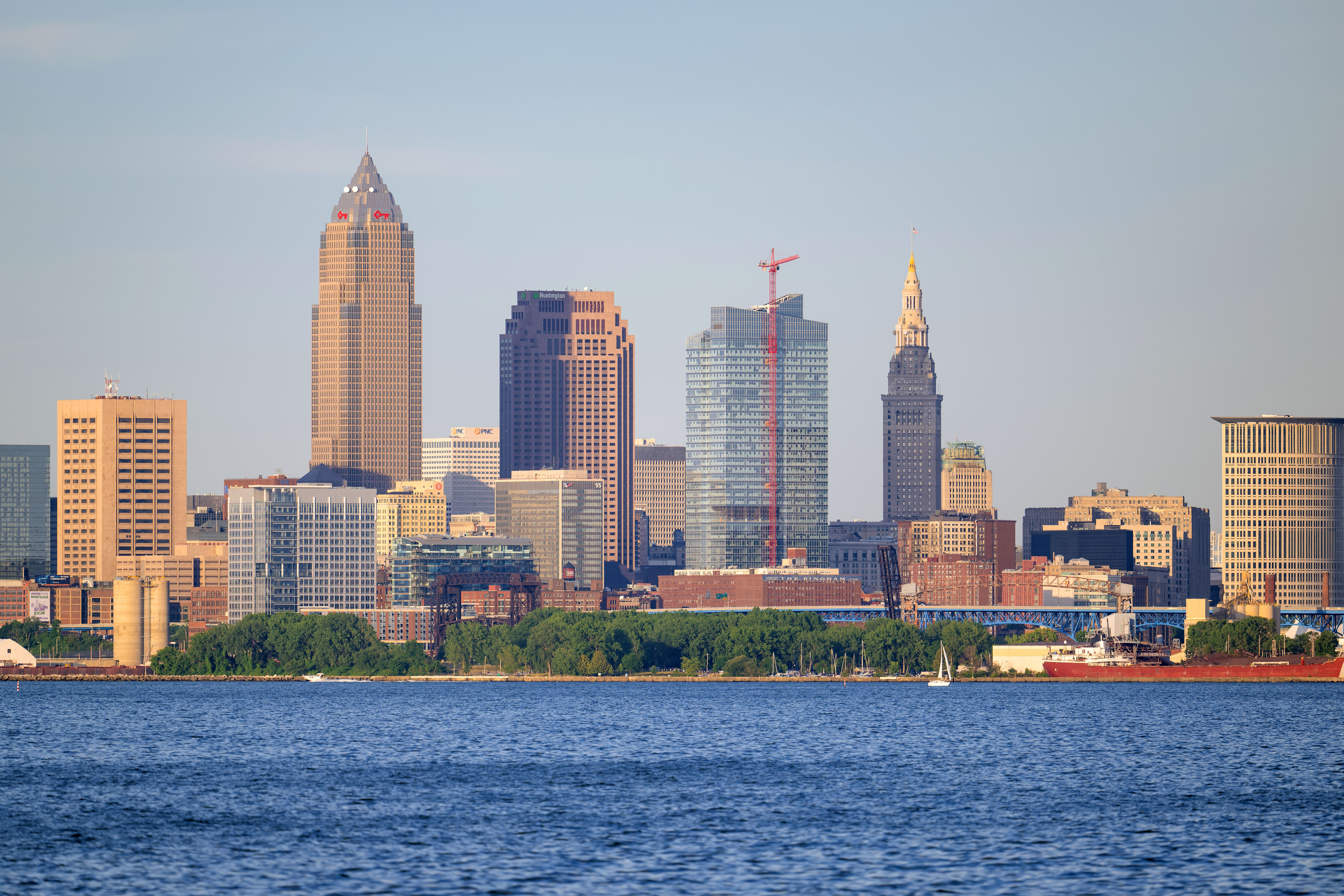
Cleveland bid to host the 1916 Summer Olympics, but lost to Berlin. Those games were ultimately canceled due to World War I.

The city of Cleveland, Ohio, began to prepare an Olympic bid in July 1910, with a citizens' committee established by Mayor Herman C. Baehr. Cleveland officials had discussed the possibility earlier, with Brookside Stadium being built in 1909 as a potential Olympic venue. Several other U.S. cities, including Chicago, Philadelphia, and San Francisco (which was holding a world's fair in 1915), also considered a bid, and all of these cities lobbied the Amateur Athletic Union for its support. At its annual meeting in New York in November, the AAU endorsed Cleveland's candidacy. San Francisco continued to advocate for an Olympic Games to be held alongside the World's Fair in 1915, while Cleveland offered to host in 1916 or a potential Intercalated Games in 1914. Cleveland sought federal appropriations to support its bid, but was turned down by Congress in favor of funding construction of the Perry's Victory and International Peace Memorial.

American organizers had expected that they would have until 1912 to put together their bids. However, in May 1911, AAU secretary James E. Sullivan telegraphed from the 12th IOC Session in Budapest to report that Berlin had been chosen for the 1916 Games, and that no Olympics in between 1912 and 1916 would be considered. While this decision by the IOC was not final or official, and other cities around the world (including Budapest and Alexandria, Egypt) continued to pursue bids until Berlin was formally chosen in 1912, the announcement put an end to the American efforts to bid for the Games.

After the 1916 Summer Olympics were thrown into doubt by the outbreak of World War I in Germany, several American cities volunteered as potential replacement hosts. Cleveland city councilman Clayton Townes revived the city's plans in September 1914, saying that 50,000 to 60,000 seats could be added to Brookside Stadium in as little as six months. San Francisco again suggested combining the event with its World's Fair, while the Chamber of Commerce in Cincinnati, Ohio, announced it was willing to cover the travel expenses of foreign competitors to the city. James E. Sullivan of the AAU suggested New York City as a possible site, but died unexpectedly before talks could develop further. However, IOC president Pierre de Coubertin rejected all of these proposals out of hand, announcing in March 1915 that "the international committee has no right to withdraw the celebration of the Olympic games from the country to which this celebration has been given without consulting that country". As a result, the 1916 Games became the first edition of the event to be canceled altogether.

=== 1920 ===
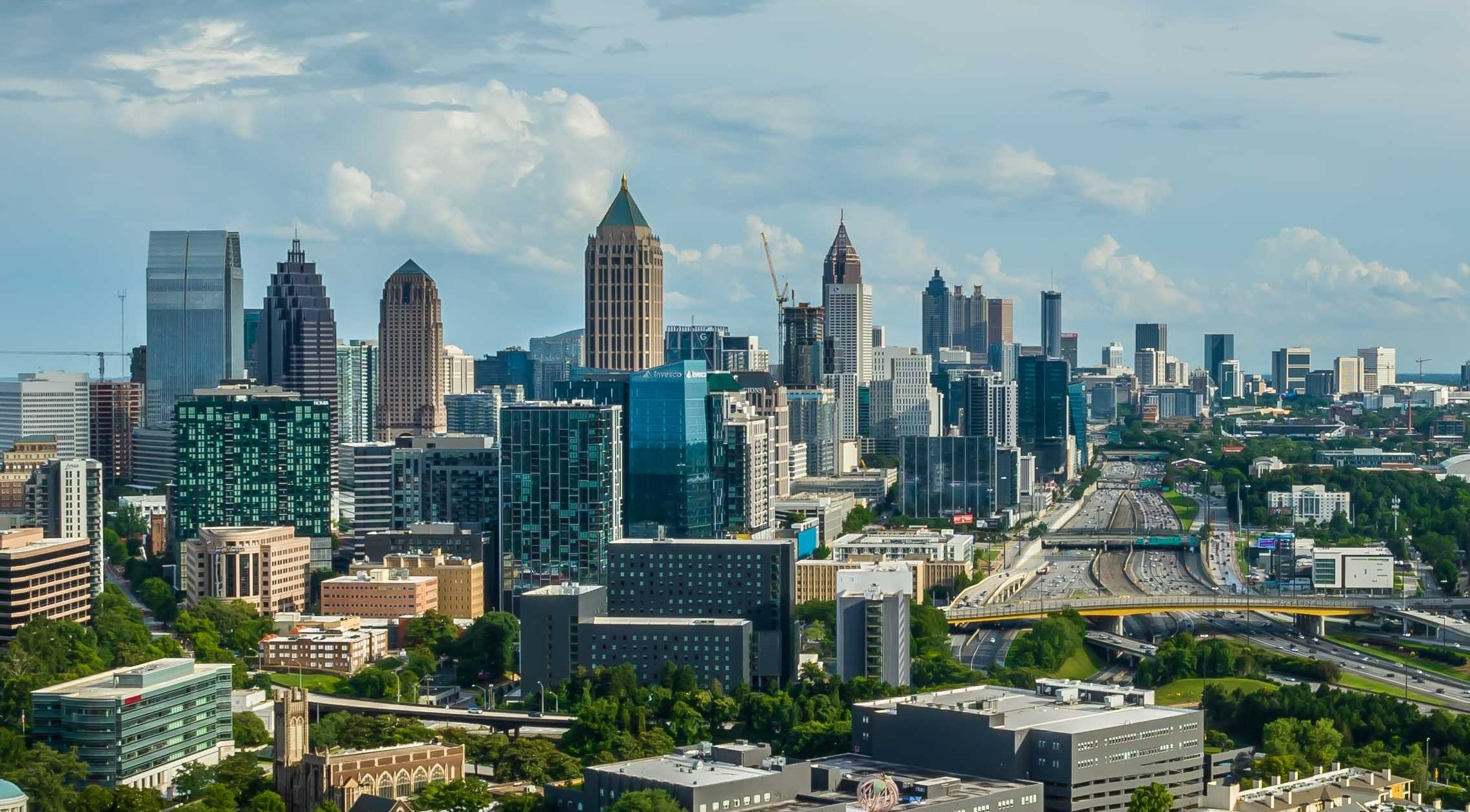
Atlanta made their first Olympic bid for the 1920 games. Atlanta would eventually secure the 1996 Summer Olympics.

Due to the disruption created by World War I, a host city for the 1920 Summer Olympics was not chosen until 1919. Baron Pierre de Coubertin, founder of the IOC, wrote that "Atlanta, Cleveland, and Philadelphia had all three promised the earth" in their proposals to the IOC, but none of these American cities made a formal bid and no further consideration was given. The 1920 Olympics were held in Antwerp, Belgium.

=== 1924 and 1928 ===
By the time the 1920 Summer Olympics were held in Antwerp, the IOC had already received 13 bids to host the 1924 Summer Olympics, including four American bids from Atlantic City, Boston, Chicago, and Los Angeles. Los Angeles sent a delegation to Antwerp led by local real estate developer William May Garland. Garland met with IOC members and presented to them the city's bid, which centered on its plans to build Los Angeles Memorial Coliseum in Exposition Park. The minutes of the IOC session recorded that "Mr. Garland from Los Angeles made a brilliant presentation of the city's candidacy." However, Coubertin desired that his own home city of Paris would host in 1924, and he had already promised the 1928 Summer Olympics to Amsterdam. The final decision was postponed until the next IOC session in Lausanne, Switzerland, in 1921.

At Lausanne, Coubertin urged the committee members to approve his proposals for the 1924 and 1928 Olympics as a parting gift. Up to that point, all Olympic hosts had been approved by a unanimous vote of all committee members. When the host cities were chosen on June 2, the delegations from four countries opposed Coubertin's motion, but both proposals were approved. The candidate cities officially recorded for the 1924 Games were Amsterdam, Barcelona, Los Angeles, Paris, Prague, and Rome. Paris was chosen. The committee's attention then turned to the host for 1928, for which only Amsterdam and Los Angeles were recorded as candidates. Amsterdam was chosen.

Both American delegates to the committee, Sloane and Bartow S. Weeks, were ill and could not attend the session. Gustavus Kirby and his secretary Fred Rubien traveled to Lausanne in their stead. Kirby told Coubertin at the beginning of the session that Los Angeles was still interested in hosting in either 1924 or 1928. The Americans were unaware of the meeting in which the hosts were chosen, and they came to a meeting the next day prepared to present on Los Angeles' behalf, only to be told that the decision had already been made.

=== 1932 ===
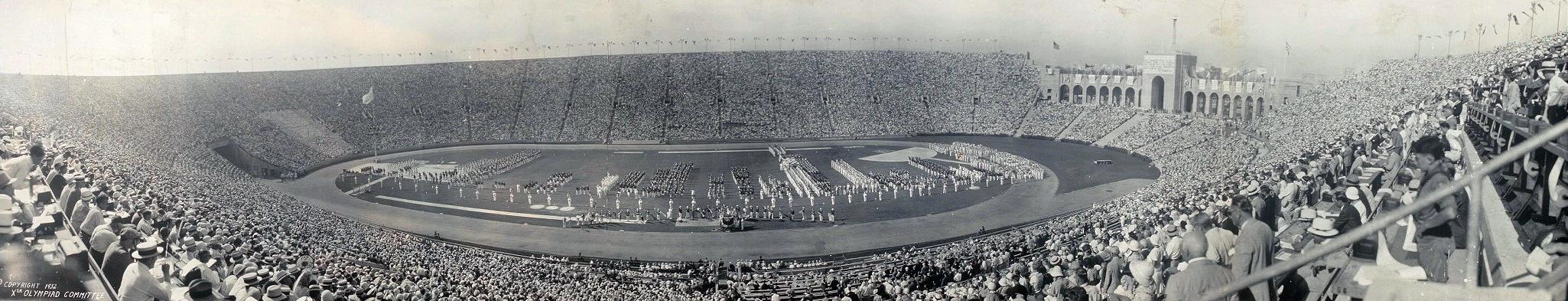
The Opening Ceremony of the 1932 Summer Olympics in Los Angeles.

After the vote in Lausanne, William May Garland continued to correspond with Coubertin and befriended him. Garland was named as a member of the IOC himself, being officially elected on March 17, 1922. With the Memorial Coliseum nearly finished, Garland traveled to the 21st IOC Session in Rome, which began on April 7, 1923. On the third day of the session, Garland presented Los Angeles' bid for the 1932 Summer Olympics. He argued that the city made an excellent Olympic host not only because of its new stadium, but also because it was far removed from the political turmoil of post–World War I Europe. The assembled committee members immediately and unanimously moved to award the 1932 Olympics to Los Angeles, without further debate and without considering bids from other cities.

=== 1940 ===
No American city initially bid for the 1940 Summer Olympics, which were awarded to Tokyo in 1936. However, due to the outbreak of the Second Sino-Japanese War, the Japanese government backed out of hosting in July 1938. Detroit, which was then bidding for the 1944 Summer Olympics, offered to step in as a replacement host for 1940. However, the event was quickly transferred to Helsinki, which had previously bid for the event and lost to Tokyo.

After World War II broke out in Europe, it became doubtful that Helsinki could host the Games. USOC chairman Avery Brundage stated on September 18 that the United States could potentially host the Olympics if they were canceled in Finland. In response, William May Garland and other businessmen founded the Southern California Committee for the Olympic Games, which advocated for Los Angeles to use its facilities from the 1932 Summer Olympics to serve as a replacement host. The IOC announced in October 1939 that it was considering moving the event again, possibly to Detroit or another U.S. city. Detroit mayor Richard Reading said that his city "would welcome the games with open arms", but Detroit's bidding committee for the 1944 Games was uncertain that the city could prepare in time for the summer of 1940. Ultimately, it was announced that no Olympics would be held until after the war was over.

=== 1944 ===
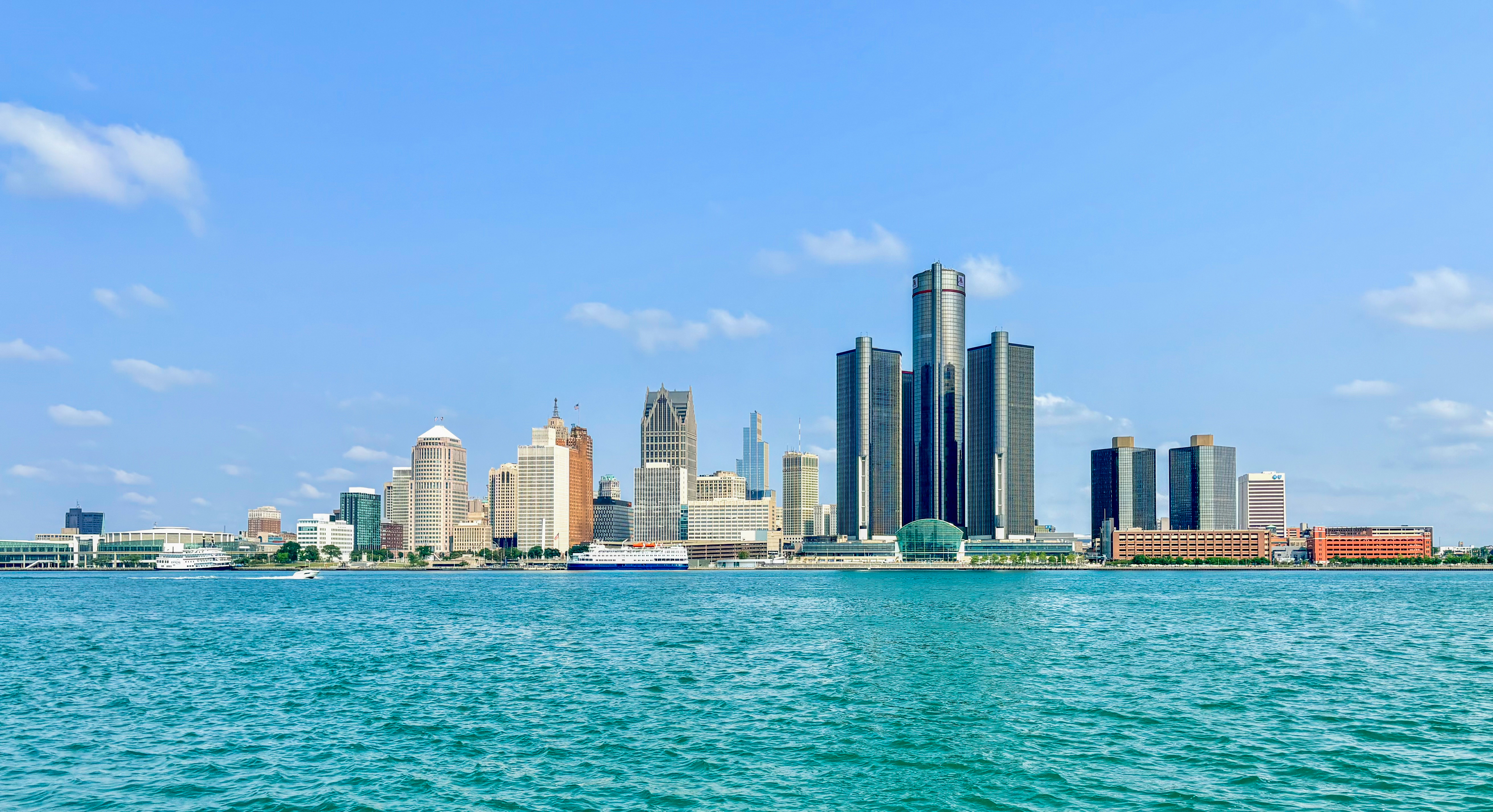
Detroit bid for the 1944 Summer Olympics which were awarded to London. Those games were canceled due to World War II. Detroit would go on to make several more unsuccessful bids in the decades to come.

In 1938, Detroit submitted a bid to host the 1944 Summer Olympics. The city proposed spending $2.5 million (equivalent to $57.2 million in 2025) to build a 100,000-seat stadium and a 15,000-seat outdoor pool in River Rouge Park, as well as an Olympic Village nearby. The host city selection took place on June 8, 1939, at the 38th IOC Session in London. Proxy votes were not permitted, so delegates who were not in London for the meeting could not cast a ballot. With London favored for 1944, Detroit's representatives told delegates they were interested in being considered as a host for 1948 instead. Detroit received only two votes, coming in third place behind Rome, with 11, and London, which won with 20.

=== 1948 ===
With the conclusion of World War II in August 1945, planning for the 1948 Summer Olympics could begin. In September, Avery Brundage stated that four American cities – Baltimore, Los Angeles, Minneapolis, and Philadelphia – had submitted "formal invitations" to host the Games, while Detroit had submitted an "informal invitation". New York and Chicago also expressed interest, but did not apply. The host city was chosen by a postal vote of IOC members, beginning in October 1945. Detroit's "informal" bid was not included on the ballot, but the other four American candidates were. London was favored from the beginning because it had been scheduled to host the 1944 Olympics before they were canceled during the war. While the vote totals were never released, it was announced on February 14, 1946, that London had been selected by "the great majority of members".

=== 1952 ===
Within a month of the host selection for 1948, the IOC announced in March 1946 that Detroit, Los Angeles, and Philadelphia had already submitted bids for the 1952 Summer Olympics, in addition to bids from Athens and Helsinki. Minneapolis also promptly renewed its bid, mailing invitations to the 1952 Olympics to all countries eligible to compete. In January 1947, Chicago mayor Edward Joseph Kelly announced the city's intention to bid.

The host city for the 1952 Summer Olympics was selected at the 40th IOC Session in Stockholm, on June 21, 1947. The five American cities bidding for the Games made up half of the 10 total candidates. On the first ballot, Helsinki received 14 of the 28 votes, one shy of a winning majority. Los Angeles and Minneapolis each received four votes, Detroit two, Chicago one, and Philadelphia none. On the second ballot, the latter three cities were eliminated from contention. Los Angeles and Minneapolis each increased their totals to five votes, while Helsinki gained a 15th vote and so was awarded the Games.

=== 1956 ===
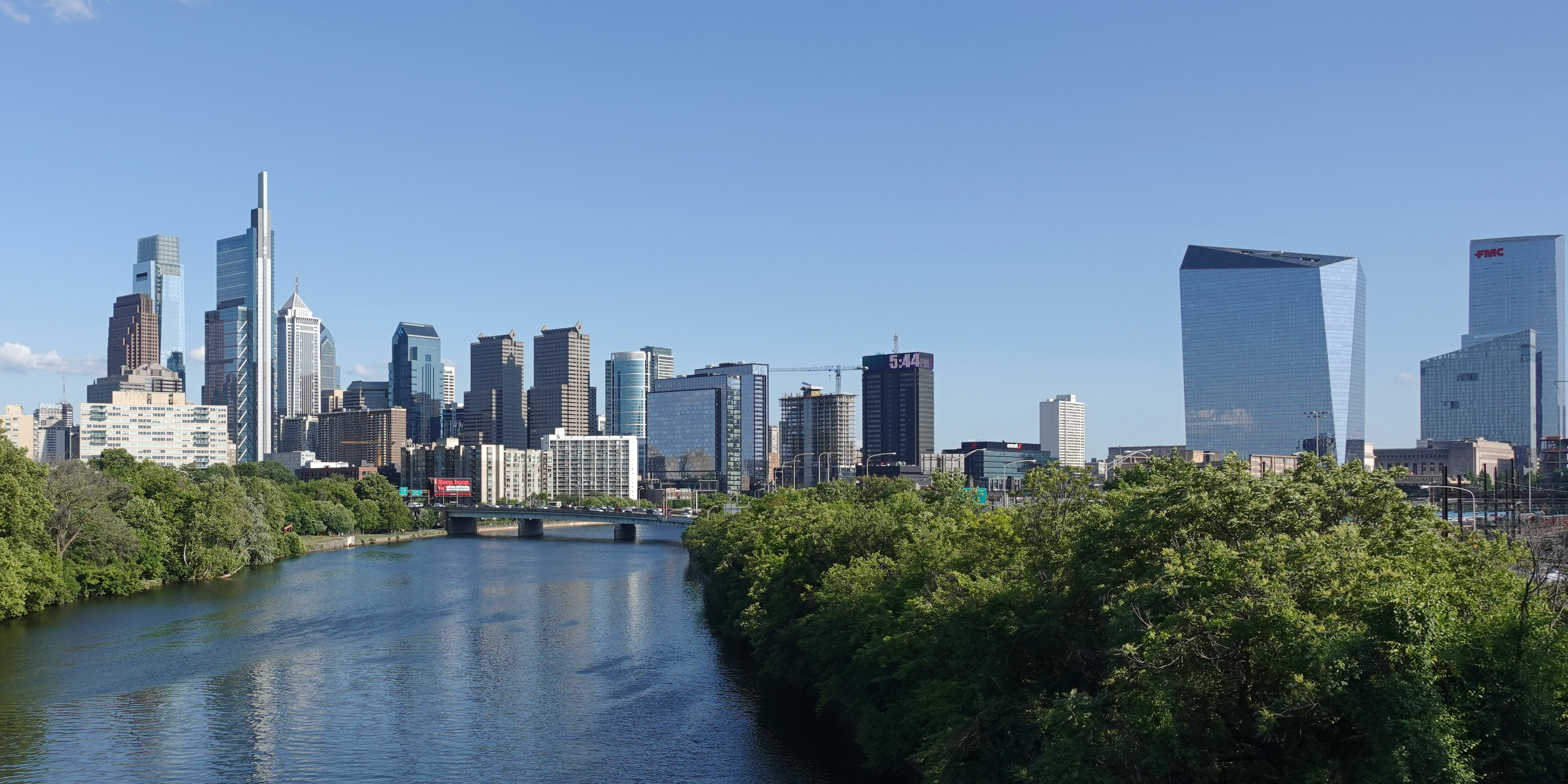
Philadelphia made their third consecutive Olympic bid when they bid for the 1956 Summer Olympics. It was the last bidding contest which featured multiple American candidates.

When the USOC convened for a meeting in New York City on July 28, 1947, Avery Brundage noted that the five American candidates for the 1952 Summer Olympics had collectively received 11 votes in the first round, close to the needed majority of 15. He suggested that it was necessary for the USOC to choose only one city for each Olympics that would submit a bid to the IOC. Representatives from Detroit, Los Angeles, Minneapolis, and Philadelphia all agreed that they would submit their 1956 bids to the USOC and let the committee decide which of their bids would go forward. Initially, it was decided that each city would submit a statement of no more than 1,500 words describing its amenities, and that the members of the USOC would choose the nominee in a postal vote based on these statements. However, the Minneapolis Olympic Invitation Committee protested this decision, arguing that in-person oral presentations would allow each city to better make its case to the committee. In August, the USOC agreed to allow such presentations.

At a Chicago meeting on December 3, the Minneapolis delegates pushed further, asking Brundage to appoint an investigative committee which would visit each of the candidate cities to inspect their facilities. All five of the U.S. cities which had bid for 1952 were included in these visits. By the time of the USOC's next meeting in New York in April 1948, the committee could not present its report as it had only visited Detroit and Minneapolis. At that time, it was expected that the decision would be made by a postal vote ending on June 15. However, the decision was delayed until July, shortly before the delegation left to attend the 1948 Summer Olympics in London. It was alleged that the Olympic Association of Southern California had threatened to withhold funding for the American athletes headed to London if Los Angeles was not chosen by the USOC. On July 11, the USOC announced that it was nominating Detroit as its candidate for 1956.

A week after Detroit was nominated, SCCOG stated that it was continuing the Los Angeles bid for the 1956 Olympics and selected Willis O. Hunter as its next chairman. Paul Helms said that SCCOG did "not think it wise of the American committee to recommend one particular site" and did "not feel bound by the U.S. Committee's decision". At the 42nd IOC Session, which coincided with the 1948 Summer Olympics in London, representatives from Los Angeles continued to advocate for their city as the host for 1956.

On March 4, 1949, a month before the IOC was set to choose the host for 1956, the U.S. Senate passed a resolution recognizing and supporting Detroit's bid and no others from the United States. A few days later, Helms announced that he had written to IOC president Sigfrid Edström to reaffirm Los Angeles' bid, predicting that the IOC "probably will not be impressed" by the USOC and the federal government attempting to influence the decision with their endorsement. However, he said that Los Angeles would not send any representatives to present its bid to the IOC other than John Jewett Garland, who was authorized to act on SCCOG's behalf while also serving as a voting member of the IOC itself. When Brundage learned that Los Angeles was still pursuing its bid, he asked SCCOG to withdraw. Garland refused, and furthermore the representatives from Minneapolis announced they would continue their own bid as long as Los Angeles did.

The host city for the 1956 Summer Olympics was selected at the 43rd IOC Session in Rome on April 28, 1949. The month before the Rome summit, the USOC learned that Los Angeles and Minneapolis were still planning to send delegates to bid for the Games, even without the USOC's endorsement. Avery Brundage and Doug Roby, Michigan's representative to the USOC, asked the two cities to withdraw their bids. Minneapolis' delegates agreed to withdraw only if Los Angeles did so, and Los Angeles (represented by Garland) refused.

With the cities refusing to cooperate, Brundage asked the IOC to choose one nominee out of six American cities – the three already bidding, plus Chicago, Philadelphia, and San Francisco – and consider only that one nominee alongside the other world cities bidding. Garland supported Brundage's request, saying that the American candidate cities would "avoid any dogfights over the nomination". However, the IOC did not act on this request, and all six American candidates were considered alongside Buenos Aires, Melbourne, Mexico City, and Montreal in the final IOC vote. Brundage said it was "rather embarrassing" that the dispute could not be resolved, while a representative from Melbourne said, "We are very optimistic, and made more so by the fact there are six American entries." Of the six American cities, Chicago, Minneapolis, and Philadelphia received one vote each on the first ballot, while San Francisco received none; these four cities were eliminated before the second ballot. Detroit received two votes on the first ballot and Los Angeles five. Both of these cities then received four votes on the second ballot, while the front-runner Melbourne had 18. On the third ballot, Detroit kept its four votes and Los Angeles added a fifth; both were eliminated after this. Melbourne prevailed on the fourth ballot, winning over Buenos Aires by one vote.

When there was uncertainty about whether the Australian government would provide the needed financial support for the 1956 Games, both Detroit and Los Angeles volunteered as replacement hosts. The IOC seriously considered moving the event as late as 1955, but the Olympics were successfully hosted in Melbourne, except for the equestrian events, which were moved to Stockholm due to Australia's strict quarantine laws (see 1956 Summer Olympics).

=== 1960 ===
Before the end of the Rome session where Melbourne was chosen as host for 1956, John Garland submitted a bid for Los Angeles to host in 1960. While representatives from Detroit and Buenos Aires also said they would definitely bid again, Los Angeles was the only city to formally submit its 1960 bid in Rome. This submission may not have been accepted by the IOC: when Philadelphia and Lausanne later submitted their own 1960 bids in 1952, it was reported that those cities were the first to formally do so, and the Olympic World Library does not have a candidature document on file for Los Angeles 1960.

The USOC believed that all of the American bids for 1956 had failed because support was split between them. On January 10, 1950, when the USOC board met in Washington, D.C., it voted to ask the IOC to only consider the one American bid that received the USOC's endorsement, and to reprimand Garland for circumventing the committee's previous endorsement on the campaign for 1956. The USOC then created a special committee to select one American candidate for the 1960 Summer Olympics and one for the 1960 Winter Olympics. Eight cities expressed interest in bidding for the Summer Games. Of these, Houston and Pittsburgh were rumored to be planning a bid, and New York City said that it would present one to the USOC, but none of the three did.

The five bids presented to the USOC selection jury, at its meeting on November 17, 1954, in Chicago, were from representatives of Chicago, Detroit, Los Angeles, Minneapolis, and Philadelphia. Detroit was recommended by the jury as the candidate city.

The host city for the 1960 Summer Olympics was selected at the 50th IOC Session in Paris on June 15, 1955. This time, Detroit's rival candidates respected the decision, and there were no other American bids presented to the IOC. Detroit was one of seven cities that made presentations in Paris, alongside Brussels, Budapest, Lausanne, Mexico City, Rome, and Tokyo. On the first ballot, Detroit received six of the 59 available votes, leaving the city tied for fourth place with Brussels and Mexico City, and ahead of only Tokyo. These three cities were all eliminated after the first ballot, while Detroit was not. On the second ballot, Detroit came in third place with 11 votes and was eliminated alongside Budapest. Rome beat out Lausanne to be awarded the 1960 Games on the third and final ballot.

=== 1964 ===
By the time bidding for the 1964 Summer Olympics began, the IOC had created new rules for candidate cities, requiring each bidder to have the endorsement of its National Olympic Committee as well as its national government, thereby ensuring that only one city from any country could bid at one time. The USOC announced in June 1958 that it would need to submit its nominee to the IOC by December 1, and gave cities interested in the nomination until September 1 to apply. The USOC board met in Chicago to choose its one candidate on September 6, 1958. Chicago, Detroit, Los Angeles, and Minneapolis all renewed their previous bids by making presentations at the meeting. Detroit was chosen again as the nominee.

The host city for the 1964 Summer Olympics was selected at the 55th IOC Session in Munich, West Germany, on May 26, 1959. The other candidates bidding were Brussels, Tokyo, and Vienna. Because Tokyo had been awarded the 1940 Summer Olympics and was forced to relinquish hosting duties by the outbreak of World War II, then needed to recover from the devastation of the war before it could consider bidding again, it was considered the front-runner in its 1964 bid. However, Detroit's candidacy reportedly had the support of the Soviet Olympic Committee, which wanted to see Communist athletes succeed in the heart of the United States. Ultimately, Tokyo received the majority of the vote on the first ballot and was immediately awarded the Games. Detroit came in second place with 10 votes, while Vienna, which had been considered a distant third-place contender, received nine.

=== 1968 ===
After Detroit's successive failures, support for Los Angeles as the American candidate grew. While attending the 1961 Rose Bowl in Pasadena, California, USOC president Kenneth L. "Tug" Wilson told a Los Angeles Times reporter that Los Angeles was the best qualified city to host the Games in the United States, largely because it would not need to build a new Olympic Stadium. When Moscow, the capital of the Soviet Union, emerged as one of the leading candidates for 1968, John Garland declared that "every vote [USOC delegates] cast for Detroit is a vote for the Iron Curtain", although he predicted that the committee would still choose the doomed city over Los Angeles anyway. Doug Roby, the other American rank-and-file IOC member, continued to favor Detroit. Frederick Matthaei, the leader of Detroit's bid effort, alleged that the city's 1964 bid had been sabotaged by Americans who favored bringing the Olympics to Los Angeles instead of Detroit. Matthaei claimed that Garland, a Californian and one of the American delegates to the IOC, had voted for Tokyo because he wanted Los Angeles to host in 1968.

In September 1962, the USOC sent a seven-member Site Committee led by Robert Kane on a tour of nine cities which had expressed interest in hosting the 1968 Summer Olympics: Chicago, Detroit, Los Angeles, New Orleans, New York, Philadelphia, Portland (Oregon), San Francisco, and Washington, D.C. The Site Committee convened in Chicago on October 15 to vote on the recommendation it would give to the USOC board, which would choose the following day which city to endorse to the IOC based on that recommendation. Of the nine cities visited, only Detroit, Los Angeles, Philadelphia, Portland, and San Francisco were considered. Three of the seven Site Committee members were not present, and two of them were replaced by "observers" who voted on their behalf. The resulting six-member committee became deadlocked: three supported Detroit, three supported Los Angeles, and none were willing to budge. Supporters of Los Angeles' candidacy argued that the observers violated USOC bylaws by casting votes, further claiming that Los Angeles would have won if the observers had not voted. Debate continued through the night, and no decision had been reached by 7 a.m. October 16. One of the committee members then changed his vote from Los Angeles to Detroit, giving the city a 4–2 majority, and the USOC board of directors accepted that recommendation. The 37-member board then voted 20–13 to endorse Detroit's candidacy.

The dispute between the two cities did not end with the endorsement vote. Los Angeles supporters, including L.A. Memorial Coliseum general manager Bill Nicholas, alleged that the USOC had rigged the process in Detroit's favor. Doug Roby threatened to sue a Los Angeles-based attorney who accused him of circumventing the USOC's constitution and bylaws to get Detroit the nomination. In November 1962, California governor Edmund G. "Pat" Brown asked President John F. Kennedy to intervene and persuade the USOC to choose Los Angeles instead. Eight Michigan congressmen wrote to Kennedy, asking him to disregard Brown's request.

California officials continually pressed the USOC to reconsider its decision, and the committee agreed to hear the objections from Los Angeles at a New York meeting on March 18 and 19, 1963. To bolster Detroit's case ahead of the meeting, Michigan governor George Romney asked the state legislature to quickly pass two bills supporting construction of the Olympic Stadium, one creating a State Recreation Building Authority to issue bonds and one raising taxes on horserace gambling to pay off the bonds. Both bills were passed a few days before the USOC meeting. Philadelphia, Portland, and San Francisco all reactivated their bids before March, turning the USOC meeting into a second vote on the committee's endorsement. The five cities presented their bid materials to the USOC once again in New York, with Detroit having created a new film presentation for the event. Detroit received 32 of the committee's 40 votes, while Los Angeles received only four, Portland two, and Philadelphia and San Francisco one each.

The host city for the 1968 Summer Olympics was selected at the 60th IOC Session in Baden-Baden, West Germany, on October 18, 1963. Mexico City received 30 of the 58 votes cast on the first ballot, and was awarded the Games. Detroit came in second place with 14 votes, while Lyon had 12 and Buenos Aires two. Since a second ballot would have been needed if Mexico City had received one vote fewer, Avery Brundage said that Detroit narrowly missed a chance to pick up support on later ballots that might have won it the 1968 Games.

=== 1972 ===
The IOC planned to select the host for the 1972 Summer Olympics in 1966, one year earlier than in past cycles, giving the host six years to prepare instead of five. The USOC announced it would choose its nominee in January 1966, and on short notice in November 1965, it sent invitations to cities that had previously "shown interest in being host city", encouraging them to apply. These cities included Los Angeles, Portland, San Francisco, and St. Louis, but Doug Roby said he was unsure whether Detroit would receive an invitation because Mayor Cavanagh had said he would never approve another bid. However, Detroit did receive an invitation and the city promptly agreed to submit a bid.

The USOC chose its nominee on January 15, 1966, in a meeting at the Chicago Sheraton. The candidates were Chicago, Detroit, Los Angeles, Philadelphia, and St. Louis. Philadelphia was primarily interested in setting up for a Bicentennial candidacy for 1976. Detroit reused the presentation materials it had shown to the IOC in 1963, making it significantly better prepared than the other candidates. However, for the first time, the USOC board needed to put the nominee selection to multiple ballots because none of the cities initially received a majority of votes. On the first ballot, Detroit received 18 votes, Los Angeles 15, St. Louis eight, Chicago one, and Philadelphia none. The latter two candidates were eliminated, and on the second ballot Detroit received 21 votes, Los Angeles 16, and St. Louis five. Detroit was still one vote shy of a majority, so St. Louis was removed and the remaining two cities were put to a third ballot. This time, Detroit won by a vote of 25–17.

The host city for the 1968 Summer Olympics was selected at the 64th IOC Session in Rome on April 26, 1966. The other candidates were Madrid, Montreal, and Munich, the last of which was widely expected to be chosen as the host. Munich came two votes shy of a majority on the first ballot, while Detroit received only six votes, putting the city in last place and leading it to be eliminated before the second ballot, on which Munich won.

=== 1976 ===
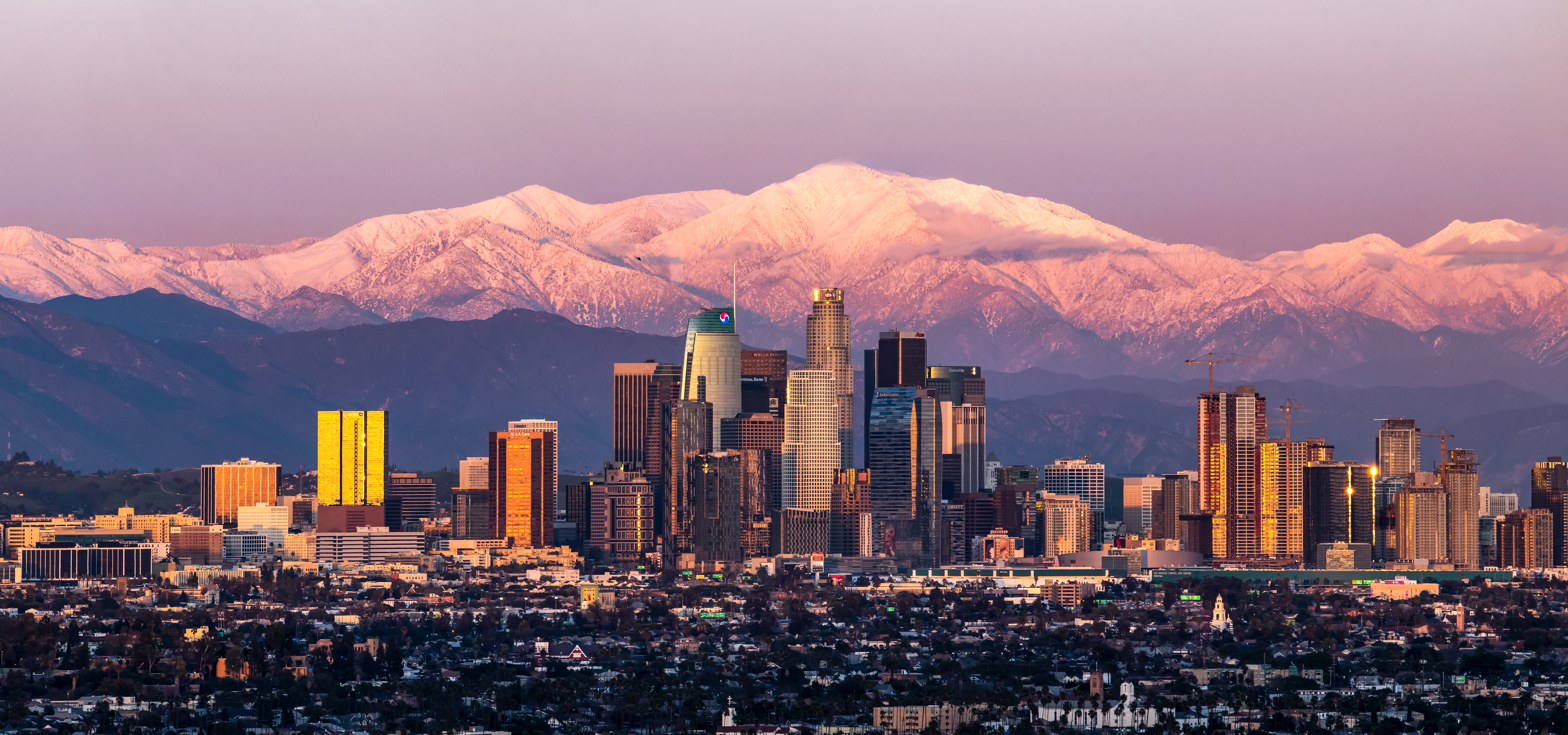
Los Angeles had bid for the 1976 Summer Olympics, losing to Montreal. They also lost their bid for the 1980 games to Moscow before securing the right to host the 1984 games.

Interest among American cities in bidding for the 1976 Summer Olympics was particularly high because that year marked the United States Bicentennial. In October 1966, months after the 1972 host city selection vote, Vice President Hubert H. Humphrey told USOC president Doug Roby that the federal government was interested in "going all out" to host either the Summer or Winter Olympics during the Bicentennial year. Roby took this to mean that the government would financially support the construction of Olympic venues. The USOC began its selection process in February 1967, intending to allow the eventual nominee as much preparation time as possible. Ten cities initially expressed interest in bidding for the 1976 Summer Olympics, including Baltimore, Chicago, Cleveland, New York, and Washington, D.C.; of these, the USOC accepted five "qualified bidders" in September 1967: Detroit, Los Angeles, Philadelphia, San Francisco, and the St. Louis suburb of Champ.

Philadelphia later withdrew its candidacy. John B. Kelly Jr., a member of the city's bid committee, had previously admitted that the city was only interested in the Olympics as a backup plan in case it failed to organize a Bicentennial World's Fair. On August 9, 1968, Detroit mayor Jerome Cavanagh announced that he had informed the USOC that Detroit would not bid for the Olympics again "until we solve the more immediate problems of housing, education, employment and social welfare of our citizens".

A site selection committee chaired by E. Newbold Black IV visited the three remaining cities in late August and early September 1968: Champ, Los Angeles, and San Francisco. Champ had no facilities at the time of the visit; it was a sparsely-populated area on the outskirts of St. Louis where developers planned to build the world's largest stadium. The USOC considered only Los Angeles and San Francisco when it selected its nominee on September 8, 1968, at a meeting in Chicago. The board ultimately voted 28–12 to choose Los Angeles over San Francisco.

The host city for the 1976 Summer Olympics was selected at the 69th IOC Session in Amsterdam, on May 12, 1970. Los Angeles competed alongside Moscow and Montreal. On the first ballot, Los Angeles received the fewest votes and was eliminated from contention. On the second ballot, Montreal prevailed over Moscow and was chosen as the host.

=== 1980 ===
The USOC sent inquiries to 40 American cities about potentially bidding for the 1980 Summer Olympics, and Los Angeles was the only city that expressed interest. The city's mayor, Sam Yorty, had attended the 1972 Summer Olympics in Munich to promote the bid among IOC members. Los Angeles was thus chosen unanimously as the American nominee to bid for the Games during a USOC meeting in New York on November 17, 1973.

No cities other than those which had bid for 1976 joined the process, so Los Angeles and Moscow were the only two candidates. Meanwhile, the only city which submitted any bid for the 1980 Winter Olympics was Lake Placid, New York. The host cities for both Games were selected at the 75th IOC Session in Vienna, Austria, on October 13, 1974. Lake Placid was chosen unanimously, while both candidates for the Summer Olympics made IOC members reluctant. Moscow had recently hosted the 1973 Summer Universiade, successfully but with some controversies such as the alleged harassment of Israeli athletes by Soviet Ground Forces troops. There were also concerns that Soviet authorities would interfere with the ability of journalists to report from the Olympics. However, choosing Los Angeles would have given both Games to the same country and would have made the IOC appear to favor NATO over the Warsaw Pact. After the ballots were cast, the IOC did not disclose the number of votes received by each city and simply announced that Moscow had been chosen. Later sources have reported that Moscow was chosen over Los Angeles by a vote of 39–20.

=== 1984 ===
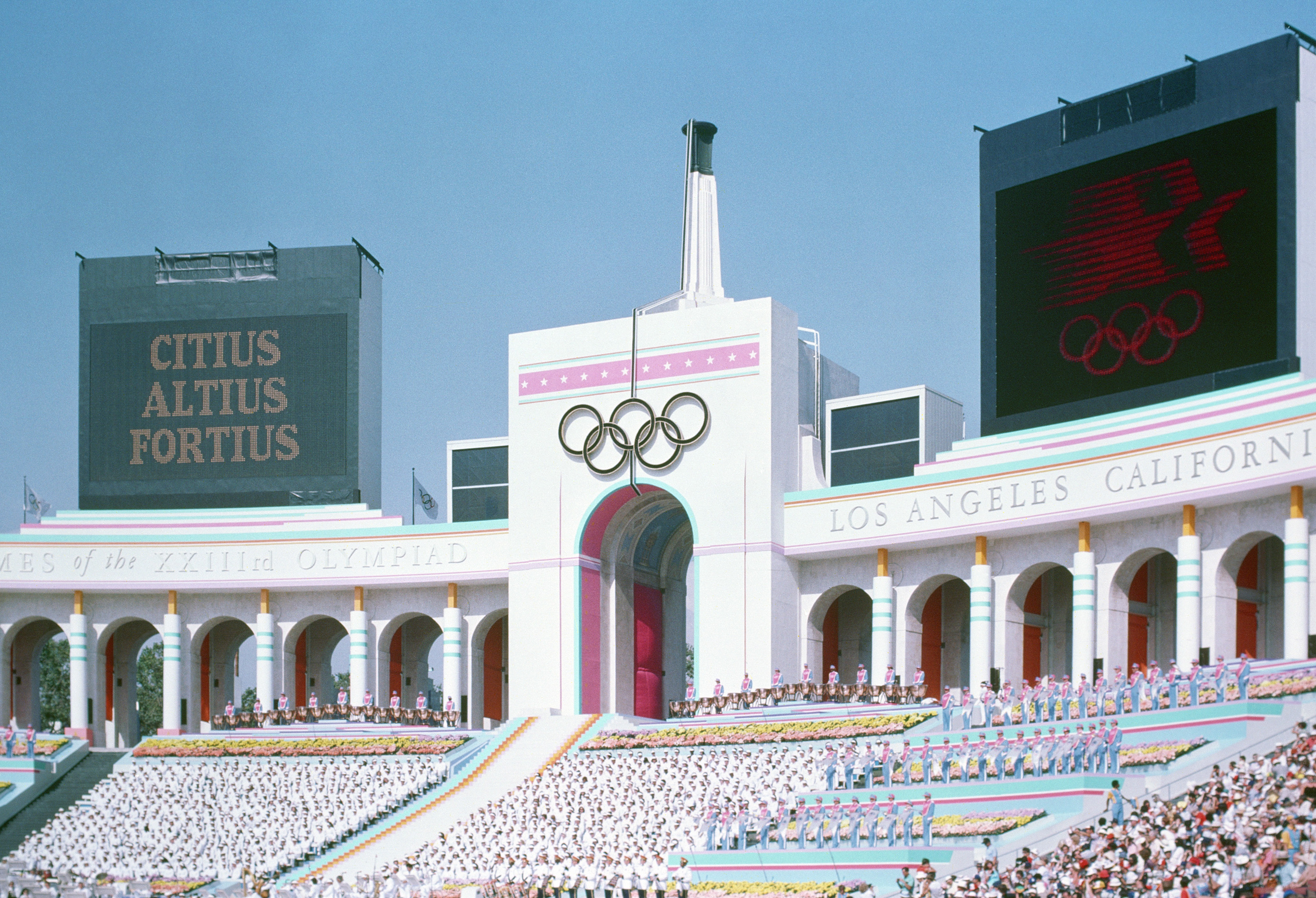
The Opening Ceremony of the 1984 Summer Olympics at the Los Angeles Memorial Coliseum

In renewing its bid for the 1984 Summer Olympics, Los Angeles faced competition from New York City and Atlanta. The New York proposal was initially viewed as a longshot, given Los Angeles' experience with the IOC, but a promise by the state of New York to cover up to $250 million in costs swayed many USOC members. The New York bid centered on the use of Shea Stadium as the main venue for the Games, but there were doubts as to whether the New York Mets would actually be willing to temporarily vacate their stadium during the regular season for the event. Atlanta withdrew its bid in July 1977, lacking the support of local government and business leaders. Boston, Chicago, and New Orleans briefly entertained their own bids, but did not pursue them. On September 25, 1977, the USOC executive board met at its Colorado Springs headquarters to choose the U.S. candidate for 1984. By an unexpectedly close vote of 55–39, Los Angeles was chosen over New York.

Los Angeles ultimately became the only city to pursue a bid for the 1984 Summer Olympics. Tehran had also submitted a bid, but political unrest in Iran led the city to abandon this effort. As a result, representatives for Los Angeles felt empowered to make demands of the IOC, knowing that the committee could not refuse its offer. In particular, the city government refused to sign the IOC's standard hosting contract, which required the city to accept liability for all debts incurred from hosting the Games. Instead, Los Angeles proposed hosting the first privately-run Olympics in history, using television broadcasting revenues to pay off the private organization's debts if there were any. IOC president Michael Morris, 3rd Baron Killanin resisted this pressure and said that if Los Angeles did not agree to the IOC's terms, the 1984 Summer Olympics would be awarded to a recent host city such as Munich or Montreal.

At the 80th IOC Session in Athens, Greece, on May 18, 1978, the Olympics were provisionally awarded to Los Angeles, on the condition that the city was required to sign the contract and accept the liability no later than July 31. Los Angeles mayor Tom Bradley refused to sign the contract unless that requirement was removed, and the two parties remained at a stalemate. On July 18, Killanin reiterated that the contract would not be altered, and Bradley announced he would withdraw the city's bid. However, the governments of both Munich and Montreal rejected the idea of serving as emergency host, and Killanin resumed negotiations with Los Angeles the next day.

The stalemate was ultimately broken by the USOC, which offered to accept all financial liability on the city's behalf. The contract was signed by Killanin and Bradley at the White House on October 20, 1978.

=== 1992 ===
Kansas City, Missouri, mayor Richard L. Berkley wrote to the USOC in April 1985 to express interest in bidding for the 1992 Summer Olympics, asking to be considered at the USOC's upcoming meeting in Indianapolis in June. The meeting was devoted to the selection of a candidate city for the 1992 Winter Olympics and a summer bid for that year was not further discussed.

=== 1996 ===
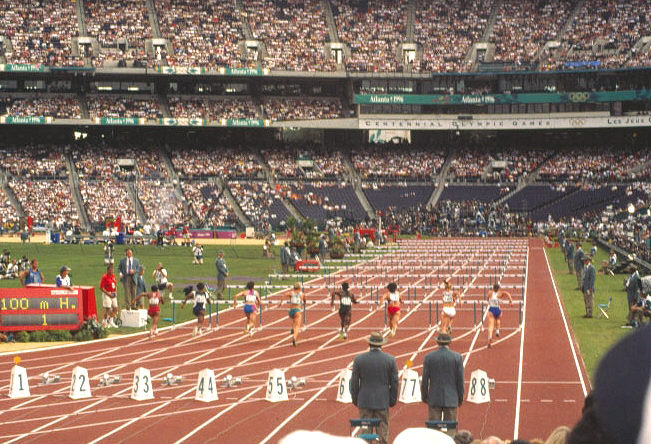
Athletics at the Olympic Stadium during the 1996 Summer Olympics.

The financial and organizational success of the 1984 Summer Olympics in Los Angeles revived interest in hosting the Games in the United States and around the world. Beginning in December 1984, two non-profit organizations proposed holding the 1996 Summer Olympics in central Florida, with venues in Orlando, Tampa–St. Petersburg, and Sarasota. When contacted about the idea in July 1985, a spokesperson for the USOC's secretary-general said that it was doubtful the United States would be awarded two Games 12 years apart. Another prospective bid was launched by Houston mayor Kathy Whitmire in December 1986, after the city had successfully hosted the U.S. Olympic Festival earlier that year. The USOC warned that there was already fierce international competition for the 1996 Games.

However, shortly after Houston's announcement, the USOC sent invitations to around 25 or 35 major cities across the U.S., encouraging them to attend an upcoming seminar on how to bid for a future Olympics. The USOC warned that the United States was unlikely to be awarded the 1996 Olympics only 12 years after hosting in 1984, but said that interested cities could begin preparing to bid for 2000 or later.

The seminar for potential bidders was held at the USOC's Colorado Springs headquarters on March 12, 1987. Delegations representing Atlanta, Cleveland, Columbus, Dallas, Denver, Honolulu, Houston, Indianapolis, Miami, Minneapolis–St. Paul, Nashville, San Diego, San Francisco, and Washington, D.C., attended the meeting. Some of these cities' representatives were discouraged by the USOC's statements about the low likelihood of a 1996 U.S. bid succeeding, and they chose to focus on a bid for 2000 or later.

The USOC set a deadline of August 1, 1987, for any city interested in submitting a bid for 1996 to send the committee a letter of intent. Candidate cities would then have until September 15 to submit their initial bid materials. Five cities sent letters of intent to the USOC: Atlanta, Cleveland, Minneapolis–St. Paul, Nashville, and San Francisco.

Cleveland's bid was an unofficial effort by "1996 Inc.", an organization founded by former Cleveland Plain Dealer journalist Kenneth Carpenter. Carpenter had received written permission from Mayor George Voinovich to attend the Colorado Springs seminar on the city's behalf, and used this to submit a letter of intent to the USOC without the city government's knowledge. Mayor Voinovich and the local Chamber of Commerce only learned of the Cleveland bid when the USOC publicly announced the names of the five bidding cities on September 8, less than a week before the deadline to submit bid materials. Carpenter did not have these materials and requested an extension from the USOC, hoping that the community could come together to assemble a bid in time for the October meeting where the USOC planned to review the candidate cities' proposals. However, after meeting with Carpenter on September 15, the mayor's office announced that it was withdrawing the Cleveland bid. Carpenter said he would pursue a bid for 2000.

A site selection committee from the USOC visited all four candidate cities between January and March 1988. On March 28, the USOC announced that it had chosen two finalists, Atlanta and Minneapolis–St. Paul, for further consideration. San Francisco was eliminated from contention in part because of LGBT-related conditions the city's Board of Supervisors placed on its support for the bid, one of which was that the Gay Games would be allowed to call itself the "Gay Olympics", the name it had used before a lawsuit from the USOC forced it to change. Nashville was considered too small to host the Olympics.

Of the two finalists, Minneapolis was considered the front-runner because it had significantly more experience in hosting amateur sports competitions, including preparations for the upcoming 1990 U.S. Olympic Festival. Atlanta's bid committee sought to make up for this disadvantage with displays of "Southern hospitality", developing close relations with USOC members and demonstrating how welcoming the city could be. The USOC chose its nominee at a meeting in Washington, D.C., on April 29, 1988, and Atlanta was chosen over Minneapolis. The vote totals were not officially released, but a member unofficially told the Atlanta Journal and Constitution that the city had won by 65 votes to Minneapolis' 42.

Atlanta was considered to be at a disadvantage in bidding against other world cities for the 1996 Olympics, particularly Athens, where Greek organizers felt they had the right to host because the Games were going to mark the centennial of the 1896 Summer Olympics in Athens. Additionally, 1996 was only 12 years after the previous Summer Olympics in the United States, Los Angeles 1984. The IOC also wanted to avoid the financial situation of the 1984 Games, where most of the substantial profits were kept by the Los Angeles organizers. The Atlanta Organizing Committee promised that a much larger share of broadcasting revenues would be distributed to the IOC and other NOCs, and emphasized the physical and cultural distance between Atlanta and Los Angeles, framing the city as the center of a progressive, modern, and still culturally distinct South – the home of Martin Luther King Jr., the cradle of the Civil Rights Movement, and thus the "worldwide capital of human rights".

The host of the 1996 Summer Olympics was chosen during the 96th IOC Session in Tokyo on September 18, 1990. While Athens led in the first ballot, Atlanta was a close second and steadily gained votes as other cities were eliminated, ultimately winning on the fifth ballot by a vote of 51–35.

=== 2004 ===
On June 18, 1985, less than a year after successfully hosting the 1984 Summer Olympics, a group from Los Angeles announced that it would pursue a long-term bid to host the 2004 Summer Olympics. John C. Argue, who had participated in the negotiations to get the 1984 Games, reasoned that Athens was likely to get the centennial Olympics in 1996 and Beijing was already considered the front-runner for 2000. St. Louis was also considered a potential candidate as of 1986. However, the 1996 Summer Olympics were actually awarded to Atlanta in 1990, forcing Los Angeles to delay its plans, believing that it was unlikely that the U.S. would host three Summer Games in a 20-year span.

The USOC reported in February 1993 that it had nevertheless received four applications for a potential 2004 bid, from Boston, Miami, New Orleans, and St. Louis (the last of which would have celebrated the 100th anniversary of the 1904 Summer Olympics there). No USOC bid was ultimately submitted to the IOC.

San Juan, the capital of the U.S. territory of Puerto Rico, submitted a bid to the IOC for 2004. This was the responsibility of the Puerto Rico Olympic Committee, which is independent from the USOC. With a record 11 cities bidding for the games, the IOC reduced the field to five finalists in March 1997, with San Juan being among the six that did not make the cut.

=== 2008 ===
Eight U.S. cities applied to the USOC to be considered as potential hosts for the 2008 Summer Olympics: Baltimore, Cincinnati, Houston, New Orleans, New York City, San Francisco, Seattle, and Washington, D.C. On May 15, 1997, the USOC announced it would not pursue a bid for 2008, believing that more time was needed to put together a bid that could match the strong competition put up by other countries. All applicant cities were encouraged to apply for the 2012 Summer Olympics or for the 2007 Pan American Games instead.

=== 2012 ===
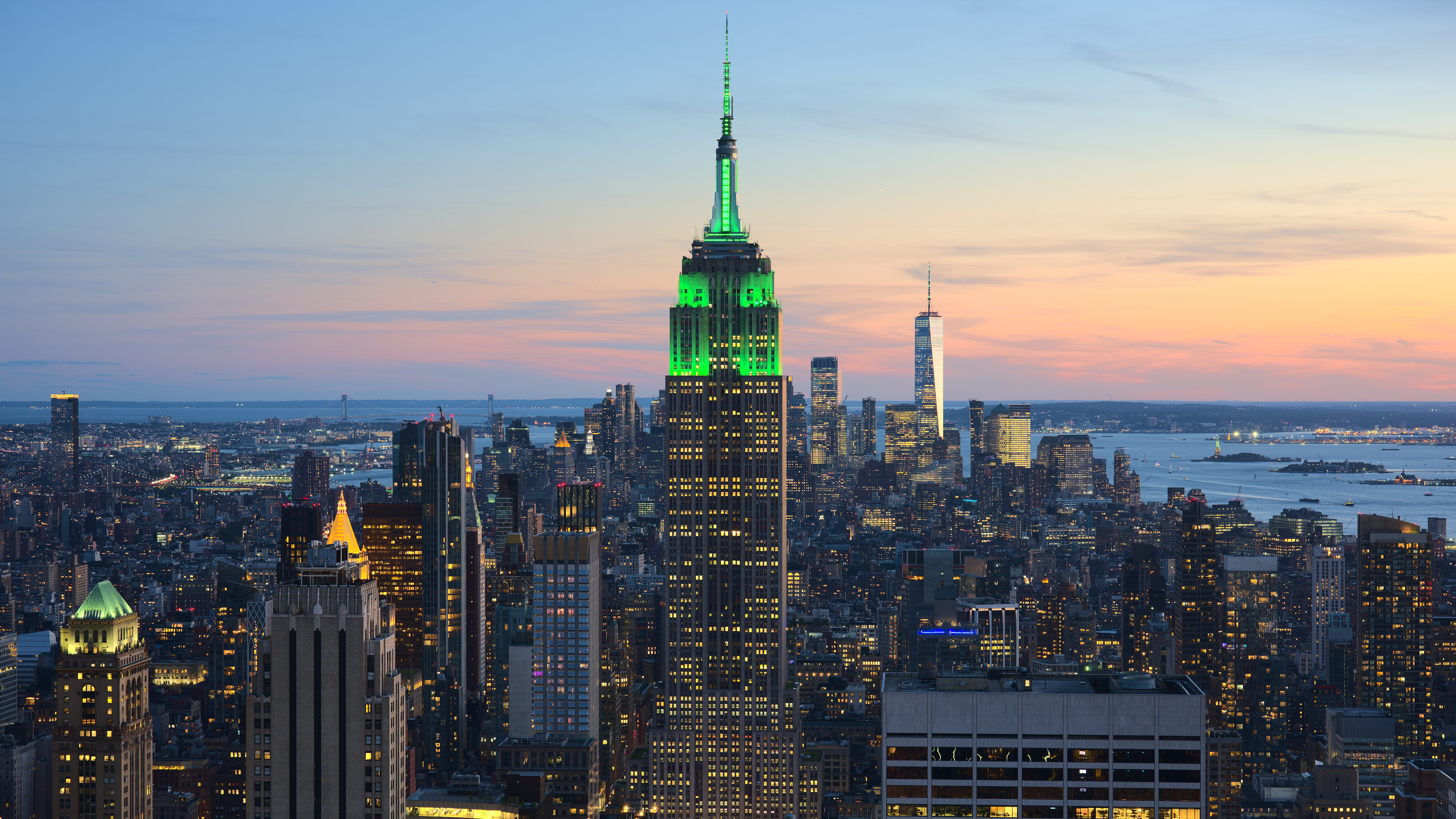
New York City bid for the 2012 Summer Olympics, but lost to London.

Months after the conclusion of the 1996 Summer Olympics in Atlanta, the USOC held a seminar for cities interested in a future Olympic bid at a board meeting in Philadelphia in February 1997. At least 38 potential bidders attended the conference, most of them having the 2008 Olympics in mind, including representatives from Baltimore, Boston, Chicago, Cincinnati, Dallas–Fort Worth, Houston, Indianapolis, New York City, Orlando, San Antonio, Seattle, and Washington, D.C. Attendees were told that a U.S. bid for 2008 was unlikely, which discouraged some but encouraged others to bid for the 2012 Summer Olympics.

After the USOC announced in May 1997 that it would not support any American bid for 2008, the competition for 2012 began in earnest. The USOC set a deadline of October 20, 1997, for all cities interested in a 2012 bid to submit an application, beginning an unprecedented eight-year process before the IOC would choose a host city in 2005. Ten applications were submitted: Baltimore, Cincinnati, Houston, New York City, San Francisco, Seattle, and Washington, D.C., all of which had applied for a 2008 bid; and Arlington, Texas; Los Angeles; and Tampa, Florida; which had not. Boston, Chicago, and New Orleans, which had applied for 2008, did not renew their applications for 2012. Each of the 10 cities paid a non-refundable application fee, $100,000 for cities which applied for 2008 and $150,000 for those that had not.

The USOC initially told these candidates that it would choose a bid to send to the IOC in late 2000, giving that city five years on the world stage before the selection. However, when the USOC board unanimously voted to pursue a 2012 bid in a meeting in Orlando on November 2, 1997, it was also decided that the nomination of the U.S. candidate city would be pushed back to the fall of 2002. Representatives of Cincinnati and Seattle were frustrated by the change, believing that the less urgent deadline would make fundraising more difficult.

The USOC initially required all candidate cities to sign a Bid Committee Agreement, registering the group that would be responsible for organizing the bid, no later than September 30, 1998. This deadline was extended to December 31 after some candidates complained about the short timeframe to meet strict requirements. By this time, the 10 cities had been reduced to eight: close neighbors Baltimore and Washington gradually agreed to combine their bid proposals into one during the spring of 1998, and Seattle withdrew from consideration in December after the Seattle City Council and Puget Sound Regional Council chose not to endorse the bid.

After the 2002 Winter Olympic bid scandal broke in November 1998, the USOC said that it would place new restrictions on candidate cities to ensure fairness in the bidding process. Following an internal review of the USOC's bidding practices, the committee announced in April 1999 that it was postponing its deadline for candidates to submit their bid materials, which had been set for March 31, 2000, until December 15, 2000. All eight cities submitted their formal proposals ahead of the deadline.

During the bidding process, the September 11 attacks occurred in two of the candidate cities, destroying the World Trade Center in New York and damaging The Pentagon just outside Washington. While neither city withdrew its bid, the attacks led security to be considered as a key factor in the deliberations that followed.

A site selection committee visited all candidate cities during the summer of 2001. On October 26, at a meeting in Salt Lake City, the USOC narrowed the field from eight candidates to four. Houston, New York, San Francisco, and Washington were shortlisted for further consideration, while Cincinnati, Dallas, Los Angeles, and Tampa were rejected. Representatives from all four cities attended the 2002 Winter Olympics in Salt Lake City, observing the operations and infrastructure of an Olympic Games up close.

Following a second round of city visits in the spring of 2002, the site selection committee met in Chicago on August 27 to choose two finalists. New York and San Francisco were advanced, while Houston and Washington were eliminated. The two remaining candidates were referred to the USOC board of directors, which held the final vote to choose its nominee at USOC headquarters in Colorado Springs on November 2. New York received 59 percent of the available votes over San Francisco, making it the U.S. candidate city for the 2012 Olympics.

The New York City bid was one of nine submitted to the IOC for 2012. On May 18, 2004, the IOC announced its shortlist of five cities, which included New York City. The U.S. bid ranked fourth in the IOC working group's assessment, behind bids from Paris, Madrid, and London, but ahead of Moscow and the four cities which did not make the shortlist (Leipzig, Rio de Janeiro, Istanbul, and Havana).

New York's bid initially centered on a plan to construct the West Side Stadium above a railyard in Manhattan, which would have become the home of the New York Jets as well as the main venue of the 2012 Olympics. The proposed stadium was unpopular with local residents and faced opposition from the owners of nearby Madison Square Garden. On June 6, 2005, one month before the host city selection, a final IOC evaluation report criticized the uncertainty of the stadium plan. Coincidentally, on the same day, the state of New York pulled its financial support for the stadium, forcing the bid committee to assemble an alternative plan for the main stadium, which became Citi Field.

The host of the 2012 Summer Olympics was chosen at the 117th IOC Session in Singapore on July 6, 2005. New York City was eliminated in the second round of voting, and the Games were awarded to London.

=== 2016 ===
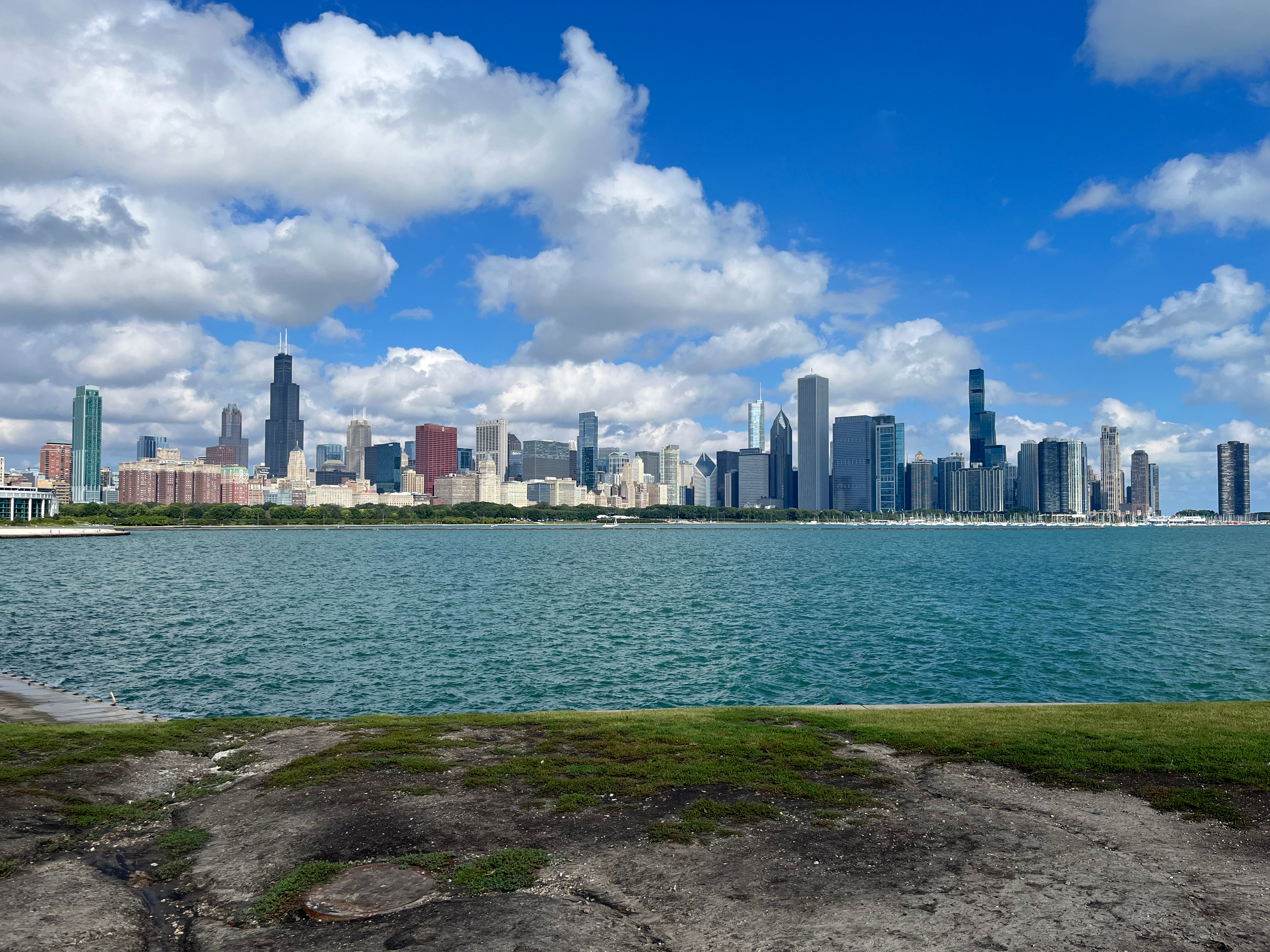
Chicago bid for the 2016 Summer Olympics but lost to Rio de Janeiro.

Immediately after the failure of New York City's bid for 2012, mayor Michael Bloomberg cast doubt on the idea of another bid for the 2016 Summer Olympics. Before leaving the Singapore session, USOC chair Peter Ueberroth announced that a new and more transparent process would be used to select the U.S. candidate city for 2016, with New York City not being given an advantage over other cities if it chose to bid again. In October 2005, Ueberroth said that the USOC was uncertain about submitting any bid for 2016, believing that the country needed to rethink its approach to avoid seeming "arrogant" in its dealings with the IOC.

Five cities expressed interest in hosting the 2016 Olympics: Chicago, Houston, Los Angeles, Philadelphia, and San Francisco. While the USOC still had not decided whether to support any American bid for the Games, a USOC delegation led by Ueberroth visited all five candidate cities in May 2006. In July, the USOC chose Chicago, Los Angeles, and San Francisco as finalists. However, Ueberroth said that none of the three cities were yet ready to submit a bid to the IOC, and that "if we do not believe a U.S. city can be competitive, we will not bid". The USOC did not consider a proposal for a binational Olympics shared between San Diego, California, and Tijuana, Baja California, Mexico, telling the bid committee that a cross-border event would require the IOC to change some of its rules, which was unlikely to happen.

San Francisco's proposal was dependent on a new San Francisco 49ers stadium being constructed at Candlestick Point, which would have also served as the main Olympic stadium. In November 2006, the 49ers announced that they would instead relocate to a new venue in Santa Clara, forcing the San Francisco bid to be withdrawn.

The USOC did not confirm that it would advance a bid to the IOC until January 2007, when the only remaining candidates were Chicago and Los Angeles. The final stage of the USOC internal selection occurred on April 14, 2007, at Washington, D.C.'s Embassy Row Hotel, where Chicago was chosen over Los Angeles. The vote totals were not disclosed.

The Chicago bid was one of seven submitted to the IOC. The executive board of the IOC narrowed the field to four finalists in June 2008, choosing Chicago as well as Madrid, Rio de Janeiro, and Tokyo for further consideration. The board made its shortlist selection based on evaluations of the bidding cities by a working group, which ranked Chicago third among the seven candidates, behind Tokyo and Madrid but ahead of Rio.

The host city selection occurred at the 121st IOC Session in Copenhagen, Denmark, on October 2, 2009. President Barack Obama, a longtime resident of Chicago, attended the session to advocate for the U.S. bid. Nevertheless, Chicago received the fewest votes on the first ballot, and thus was the first city to be eliminated from contention. The 2016 Summer Olympics were instead awarded to Rio de Janeiro. One factor cited in Chicago's loss, as well as New York's defeat four years prior, was the difficulty of obtaining visas for athletes and others to enter the United States.

=== 2020 ===
Cities considering a bid for the 2020 Summer Olympics included Chicago, Dallas, and New York.

In 2011, as the September 1 deadline to propose bids for 2020 approached, the USOC stated that it would not submit a bid unless a controversial revenue-sharing agreement with the IOC could be renegotiated first. The agreement, first established in 1988, gave the USOC 20 percent of all worldwide sponsorship revenues, far more than any other country's NOC. Many IOC members considered this deal unfairly generous to the USOC, and their disapproval of it was cited as a factor in the loss of both the NYC 2012 and Chicago 2016 bids. The USOC aimed to resolve the dispute at the 123rd IOC Session in Durban, South Africa, in July, but while progress was made, no deal was signed. The USOC therefore did not attempt to choose a candidate city, and it officially announced on August 22 that no American bid would be submitted for 2020.

On August 29, two days before the IOC deadline, a group representing Las Vegas informed the IOC that it would bid for 2020. Since this bid did not have the approval of the USOC, it was immediately rejected by the IOC.

At the 10th SportAccord World Sport & Business Summit in Quebec City in May 2012, it was announced that the dispute had been resolved. The USOC retained its 20 percent share of global sponsorship revenue, but agreed to cut its share of broadcasting rights revenue from 12.75 percent to 7 percent. When the deal was concluded, USOC chief executive Scott Blackmun said, "In terms of a bid, this removes a barrier. I think it would have been difficult for us to mount a successful bid while this was still hanging over our heads but now it has gone."

=== 2024 and 2028 ===
As of February 2013, cities which had expressed interest in bidding for the 2024 Summer Olympics included Dallas, Los Angeles, and Tulsa, Oklahoma, while Chicago, New York, and San Francisco were considered likely to bid. On February 19, 2013, the USOC invited 35 cities to consider bidding for the 2024 Games, including the six mentioned above as well as Atlanta, Austin, Baltimore, Boston, Charlotte, Columbus, Denver, Detroit, Houston, Indianapolis, Jacksonville, Las Vegas, Memphis, Miami, Minneapolis–St. Paul, Nashville, Orlando, Philadelphia, Phoenix, Pittsburgh, Portland, Rochester, Sacramento, San Antonio, San Diego, San Jose, Seattle, St. Louis, and Washington, D.C.

A binational bid for 2024 by the mayors of San Diego and the Mexican city of Tijuana, which had previously been rejected in 2006 as a proposal for the 2016 Summer Olympics, was rejected again by the USOC in April 2013, on the grounds that the IOC would not allow it.

While most of the cities receiving the invitations were not interested in a potential bid, some began considering a bid after receiving the invitation. By April 2014, cities in talks with the USOC about a bid included Boston, Dallas, Los Angeles, New York, Philadelphia, San Diego, San Francisco, and Washington, D.C. The potential New York bid was supported by Governor Andrew Cuomo but opposed by Mayor Bill de Blasio, who publicly rejected the possibility on May 28. The same day, Philadelphia mayor Michael Nutter withdrew the city from contention due to cost concerns. In June, the USOC chose four cities for further consideration: Boston, Los Angeles, San Francisco, and Washington.

On January 8, 2015, the USOC chose Boston as the U.S. candidate city to host the 2024 Summer Olympics. The bid faced substantial opposition from local residents, led by grassroots organizations like No Boston Olympics. While the majority of Bostonians supported an Olympic bid when the USOC chose the city, this quickly changed, with a majority opposed beginning in March. On July 27, 2015, Boston mayor Marty Walsh announced that he would not sign the city's contract with the USOC unless it could be guaranteed that public money would not be needed to fund the Games. Later the same day, the USOC revoked Boston's status as U.S. candidate city and announced that the bidding process would be reopened.

In the USOC's second bid selection process, Los Angeles was considered the frontrunner over San Francisco and Washington as early as the day after Boston's withdrawal. On August 12, USOC chief executive Scott Blackmun stated that negotiations were well underway with Los Angeles. On September 1, the LA City Council voted 15–0 to support a bid for the 2024 Olympic Games. The USOC finalised its selection moments after the LA City Council's vote.

After the withdrawal of other candidates, Los Angeles became one of only two cities bidding for the 2024 Summer Olympics, the other being Paris. As a result, the IOC decided on July 11, 2017, that it would award the 2024 Games to one candidate and the 2028 edition to the other. Through discussions between the two bid committees and the IOC, it was agreed that Paris would host in 2024 and Los Angeles in 2028, and this was made official on July 31.

== Winter Olympics ==
=== 1928 ===
The first Winter Olympic Games were held in Chamonix, France, in January 1924, in association with the 1924 Summer Olympics in Paris. As American athletes participated in Olympic tryouts and prepared to travel to Chamonix, a Winter Sports Association was organized in Minneapolis, Minnesota, in December 1923. In addition to sending its top winter athletes, the association proposed sending delegates who would bid for the right to host the 1928 Winter Olympics in Minneapolis. However, just as France had organized both the Summer and Winter Games for 1924, the Netherlands, which was hosting the 1928 Summer Olympics in Amsterdam, asserted the right to choose a host for that year's Winter Games. Therefore, on December 29, 1923, the Winter Sports Association agreed to bid for the 1932 Winter Olympics instead.

=== 1932 ===
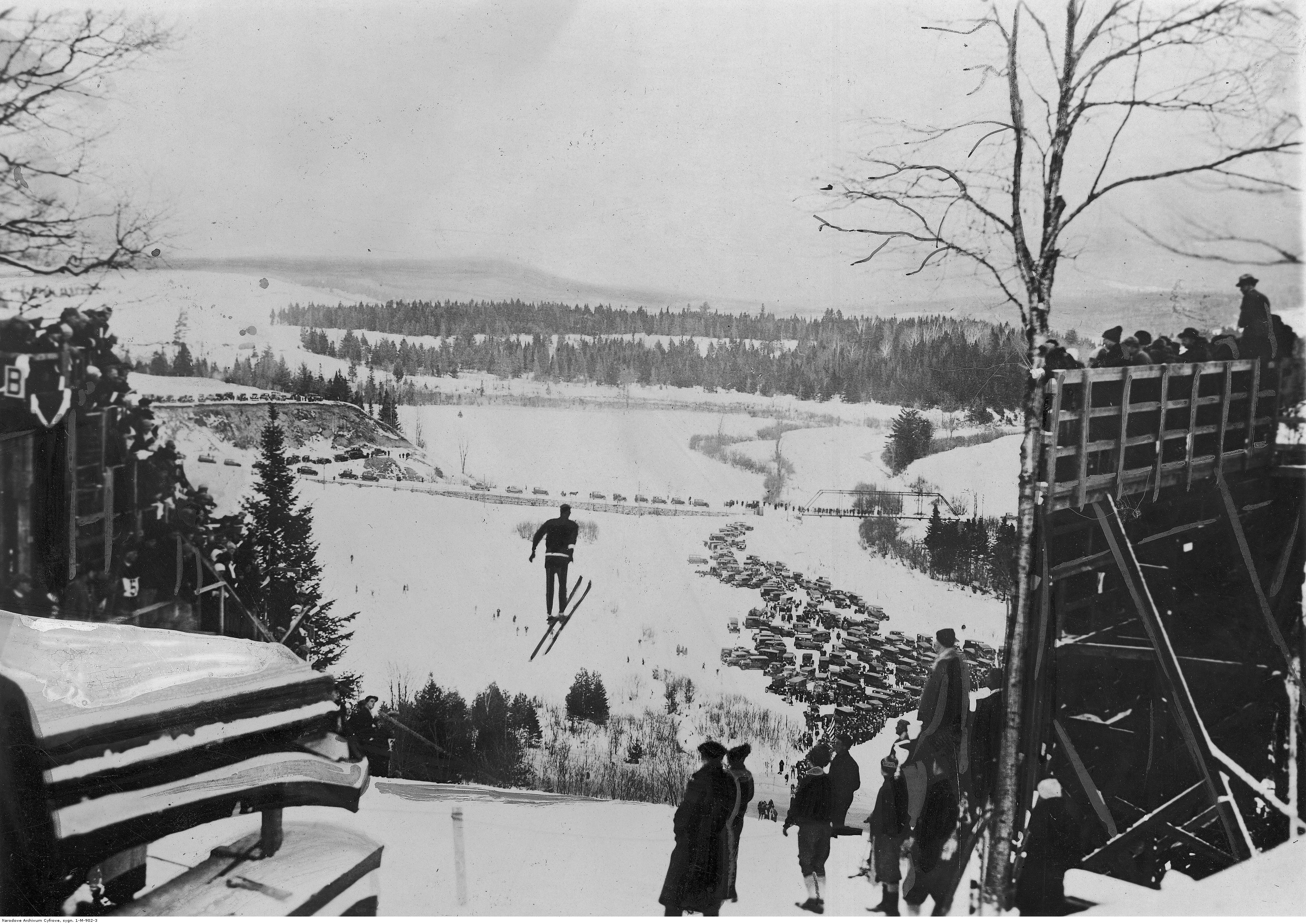
Lake Placid during the 1932 Winter Olympics.

On December 28, 1923, Minneapolis mayor George E. Leach was appointed by the National Ski Association to serve as the manager of the U.S. Olympic ski team at the 1924 Winter Olympics, and as a delegate to the International Ski Congress that coincided with those Games. While Leach himself had no skiing experience, he was said to be "intensely interested in the sport", and was chosen because he was "familiar with the territory in which the European contest will take place" and "knows men in France who will give the American team the best opportunities possible in every way." Leach used the position primarily to advocate for Minneapolis as the host of the 1932 Winter Olympics, to the point that he neglected the athletes he was there to manage, visiting them only four times during the Games. When Ragnar Omtvedt dislocated his knee during a ski jump, he received no medical attention for five hours and the injury ultimately ended his career. Leach blamed the French officials for this, but American ski officials blamed Leach. Upon his return to Minneapolis, Leach announced that he had garnered the IOC's support and that the city would be favored to host the event.

At the 8th Olympic Congress, held in Prague in 1925, the Olympic Winter Games Charter was signed, stipulating that, whenever possible, the Winter Olympics should be hosted by the same country as the Summer Olympics of the same year. Since the 1932 Summer Olympics had already been awarded to Los Angeles in 1923, this meant that the Winter Olympics would also be held in the United States, unless no venue in the country was considered adequate.

Elsewhere in Minnesota, the Duluth Ski Club announced its intentions to bid for the event as early as November 1926. The recreation director of the city of Hibbing told the local Lions Club in February 1927 that they should do the same. The USOC approached Lake Placid, New York, in late 1927 as a potential host for the event, as it was one of the nation's few established winter sports attractions.

The 1928 Winter Olympics in St. Moritz, Switzerland, provoked further interest among Americans in hosting the 1932 Winter Olympics. Godfrey Dewey of Lake Placid was manager of the U.S. ski team in St. Moritz, and he returned convinced that Lake Placid was just as capable of hosting such an event. At a celebratory dinner for returning athlete Irving Jaffee and his contested gold medal on February 28, 1928, Bear Mountain in New York's Hudson Valley was proposed as a potential location for the next Winter Olympics; the Palisades Interstate Park Commission promptly agreed to submit a bid.

Since the 1932 Summer Olympics were to be held in California, several sites in that state were offered as venues for the Winter Olympics. Big Bear Lake and neighboring Lake Arrowhead were considered at one point as locations. Lake Tahoe was proposed in May 1928, and it quickly received the endorsement of William May Garland, the IOC member from Los Angeles who had negotiated the Summer Olympics for his city. The National Park Service offered Yosemite Valley as a potential host in November 1928, dependent on congressional approval of funding for a road from the valley to Glacier Point. Big Pines Recreation Park in northern Los Angeles County, home of an annual winter sports carnival, announced a late bid in February 1929.

Among these various bids, historian E. John B. Allen has written that the "only serious contenders were California and Lake Placid." Garland and other organizers for the Summer Olympics in Los Angeles believed that California had the right to host the Winter Olympics, but they were not consistent in identifying any particular site within the state as their preferred host. Godfrey Dewey wrote to Garland in January 1929, saying that California had no established winter sports facilities and lacked the needed experience to host the Winter Olympics, and asking him to withdraw. Garland wrote back, "Let the best man win", and dispatched five Californians to represent the state's bid to the IOC. Several European IOC members believed that there were no winter sport venues capable of hosting the Winter Olympics in all of North America and wanted to send a special commission to investigate.

The host city for the 1932 Winter Olympics was chosen at the 27th IOC Session in Lausanne, Switzerland, on April 10, 1929. The session was originally scheduled to be held in Alexandria, Egypt, but was moved to IOC headquarters at the last minute. The seven American proposals presented to the IOC were those from Bear Mountain, Denver, Duluth, Lake Placid, Lake Tahoe, Minneapolis, and Yosemite Valley. There was also a bid from Montreal, Canada, and an offer by the Norwegian government to step in as an emergency host, but these were only to be considered in the event that all American bids were eliminated first. Lake Placid was unanimously chosen by the IOC. William F. Humphrey of the California Olympic Games Committee declared the decision "an outrage" and threatened to organize a competing winter sports event somewhere in California.

=== 1948 ===
The Olympics were cancelled during World War II, but after the war ended, the IOC quickly began preparations for the 1948 Winter Olympics as well as their summer counterpart. On August 29, 1945, two weeks after the surrender of Japan, while IOC delegates were meeting in London, Lake Placid telegraphed American delegate Avery Brundage to offer its candidacy for the Winter Games. The only other bid came from St. Moritz, Switzerland, which had hosted the Winter Olympics in 1928. The IOC preferred Switzerland over the United States as a host because it had been neutral in World War II, although the defeated Axis powers were excluded from the 1948 Winter Olympics. St. Moritz was unanimously selected over Lake Placid in September 1946.

=== 1952 ===
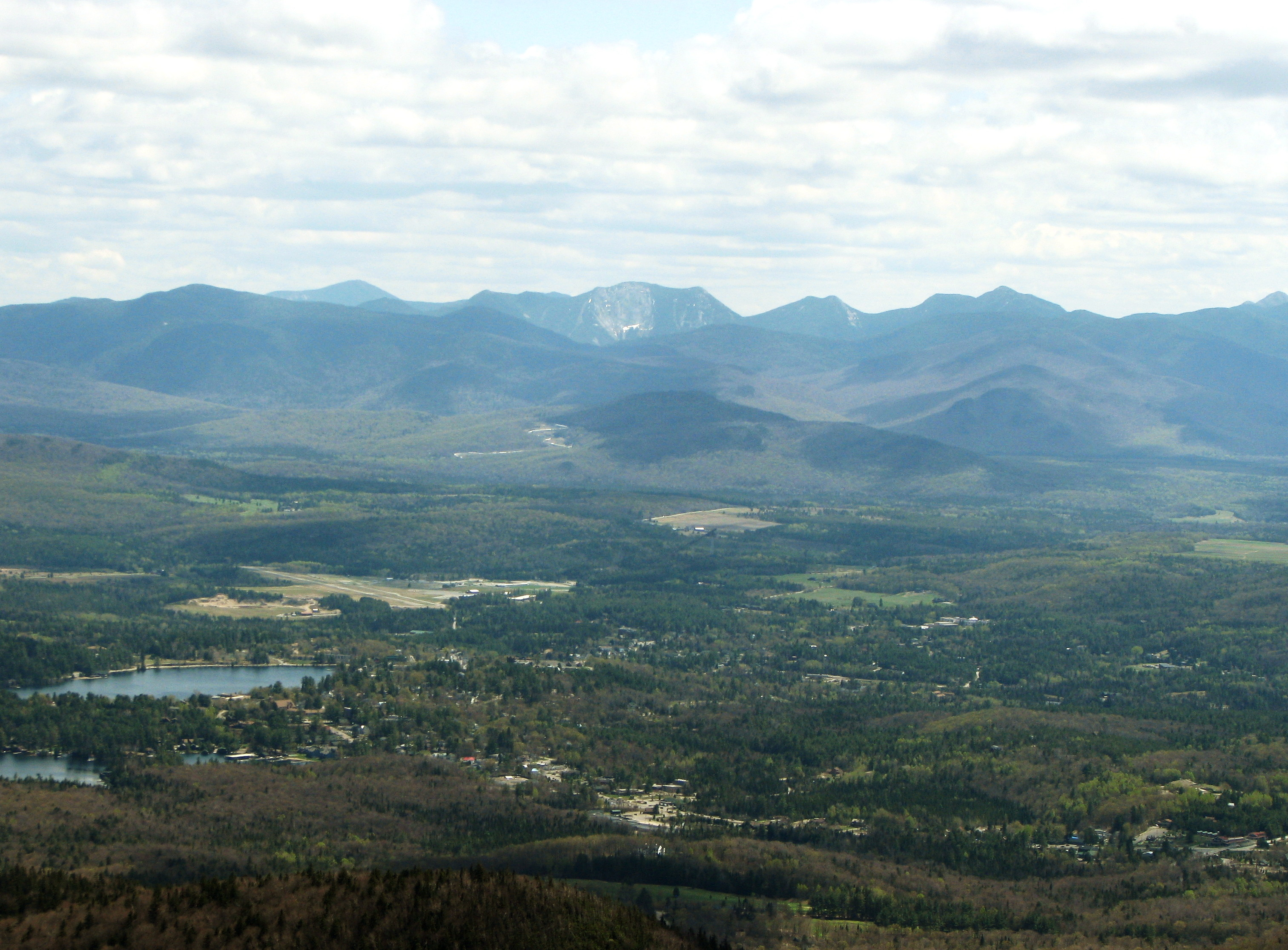
Lake Placid made multiple bids for the Winter Olympics following the 1932 games. They made back to back bids for the 1952 and 1956 Winter Olympics losing to Oslo and Cortina d’Ampezzo respectively.

Lake Placid quickly renewed its bid for the 1952 Winter Olympics. In connection with the Detroit bid for the 1952 Summer Olympics, another winter bid was promoted by the Upper Peninsula Winter Sports Committee, chaired by George Grenholm, city recreation director of Escanaba, Michigan. Minneapolis considered bidding for the Winter Olympics, but the city's delegates pursued a summer bid instead.

Neither Lake Placid nor Escanaba sent delegates to the 40th IOC Session in Stockholm, where the decision was to be made on June 21, 1947. Both cities instead asked Avery Brundage to present their bids at the meeting. Brundage acknowledged only the Lake Placid bid, and Lake Placid was the only American city that appeared on the IOC ballot, alongside Oslo and Cortina d'Ampezzo, Italy. Lake Placid received only one vote, while Oslo was chosen on the first ballot.

=== 1956 ===
Due to the failure of all five American bids for the 1952 Summer Olympics (see § 1952), the USOC announced in 1947 that for the first time, it would nominate one city to bid for each of the 1956 Games, Summer and Winter (see § 1956). In a meeting in Chicago on July 10, 1948, the USOC endorsed Lake Placid as its preferred candidate for the 1956 Winter Olympics, without any apparent competition from other cities.

The host city for the 1956 Winter Olympics was selected at the 43rd IOC Session in Rome on April 28, 1949. Despite the USOC's endorsement of Lake Placid, Colorado governor William Lee Knous sent a telegram to Avery Brundage on April 22, inviting the IOC to consider a joint bid by Aspen and Colorado Springs. This last-minute bid was accepted. On the first and only ballot, Lake Placid received one vote and came in last place, while Colorado Springs received two votes. Cortina d'Ampezzo received 31 of the 41 votes cast and was chosen as the host.

=== 1960 ===
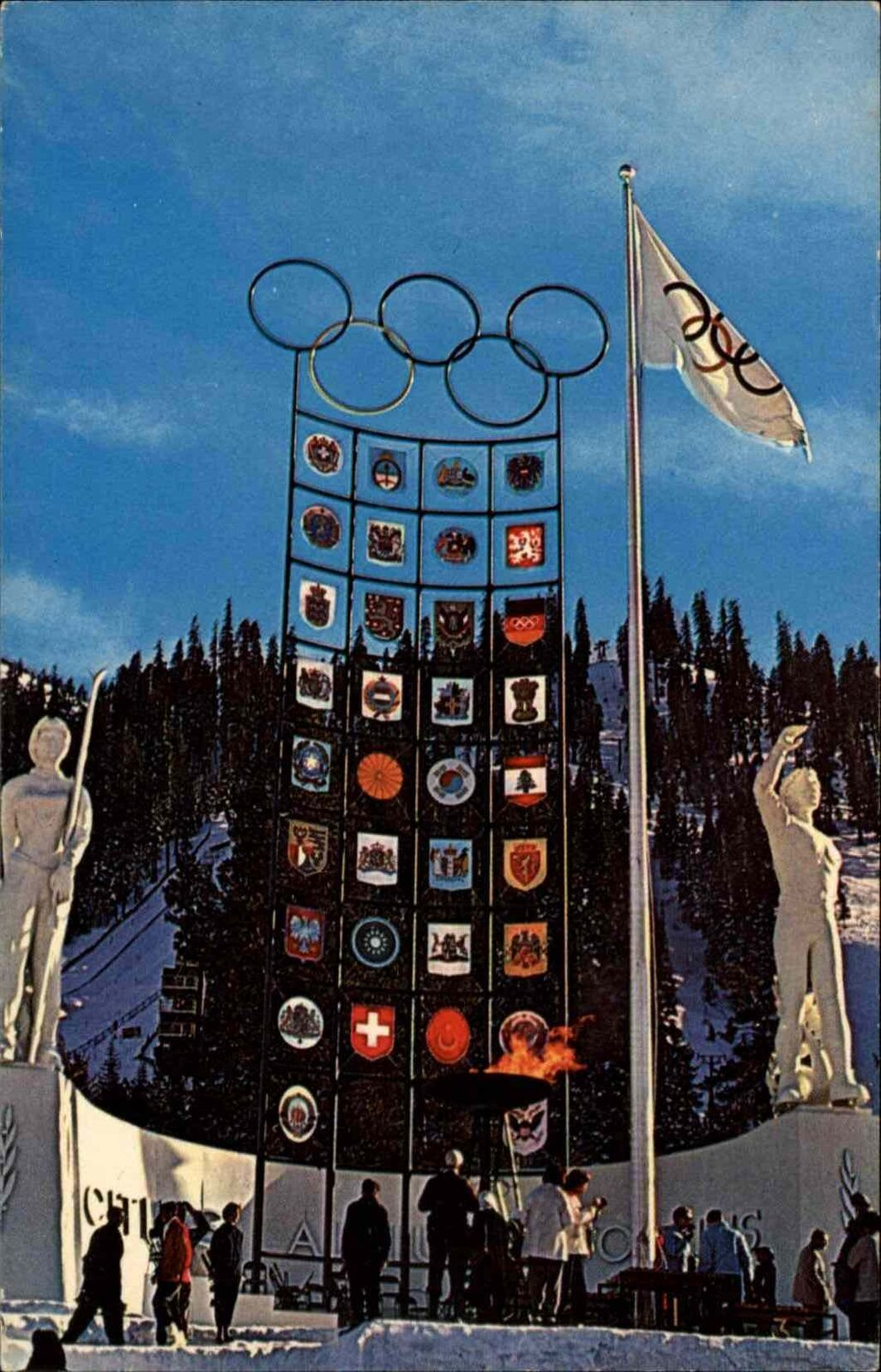
Squaw Valley during the 1960 Winter Olympics. The village is now known as Olympic Valley.

The USOC believed that all of the American bids for 1956 had failed because support was split between them. As a result, it created a special committee to select one American candidate for the 1960 Summer Olympics and one for the 1960 Winter Olympics. Three cities submitted bids for the Winter Games: Lake Placid; Sun Valley, Idaho; and a joint bid between Colorado Springs and Aspen, Colorado. The USOC selection jury intended to nominate one of these three cities as the American candidate city at its meeting on November 17, 1954, in Chicago, but the decision was delayed. By the time the committee next met, on January 8, 1955, in New York City, two additional cities had prepared bid presentations: Reno, Nevada, and Lake Tahoe–Squaw Valley (now Olympic Valley), California. Shortly before the meeting, the California State Senate agreed to appropriate $1 million to fund the event if it was held in the state. Squaw Valley received the committee's nomination. Residents of Salt Lake City, Utah, protested that their area was not fairly considered because they had been unaware of the new bidding process.

The IOC chose a host city for the 1960 Winter Olympics at its 50th Session in Paris on June 17, 1955. Before the vote, the validity of the U.S. bid was questioned, as the Olympic Charter required each Olympic Games to be hosted by a city, and the California bid centered on a privately-owned ski resort. Alexander Cushing, owner of the Squaw Valley Ski Resort (now Palisades Tahoe) and president of the California Winter Olympics Committee, told the IOC delegates that Squaw Valley was an incorporated municipality and "by no means" a private business (in fact, to this day Olympic Valley remains unincorporated). The resort was chosen on the second ballot over Innsbruck, Austria (which would later host the 1964 Winter Olympics), by a vote of 32–30.

=== 1968 ===
In June 1962, Ski Utah Associates approached the USOC with a proposal to host the 1968 Winter Olympics in Salt Lake City. Lake Placid was the only other candidate that applied to the USOC with a bid for 1968. On October 16, 1962, in a meeting in Chicago, the USOC picked Lake Placid over Salt Lake City as its bid to the IOC.

The host city for the 1968 Winter Olympics was selected at the 61st IOC Session in Innsbruck, Austria, on January 28, 1964 (immediately before the 1964 Winter Olympics opened there). On the first ballot, Lake Placid received three of the available 48 votes and came in fifth place out of the six candidate cities. Lake Placid was eliminated from contention after the first ballot and the Games were ultimately awarded to Grenoble, France.

=== 1972 ===
After losing its bid for the 1968 Games, Lake Placid continued to pursue a candidacy for the 1972 Winter Olympics. The city initially faced competition from Salt Lake City and a bid from the state of Colorado. All three sought the influential endorsement of the U.S. Ski Association (USSA) at its annual convention in Spokane, Washington, in June 1965. At the convention, the Colorado Olympic Commission announced that it would not bid for 1972 and was endorsing Salt Lake City, on the condition that Utah officials would endorse Colorado in a potential future bid for the 1976 Winter Olympics. Lake Placid, meanwhile, told the USSA that it would make its presentation later, possibly at the group's 1966 convention. As a result, the USSA endorsed Salt Lake City's bid.

Late in 1965, it became known that the IOC was planning to award hosting duties for both 1972's Summer and Winter games at its 64th Session in Rome in April 1966, earlier than previous Winter Olympic hosting decisions had been made. Furthermore, the IOC set a deadline of December 15, 1965, for all candidate cities to submit their applications. This deadline was pushed back to December 31 and later to January 20, 1966, but it forced the USOC to accelerate its process for choosing the U.S. candidate city. The USOC thus informed interested cities on December 1, 1965, that they would need to prepare their formal bids in time for a committee meeting in Chicago the following month.

At the Chicago meeting on January 16, 1966, the USOC voted by a wide margin to select Salt Lake City as the U.S. candidate, with the city receiving 36 of the 42 available votes. Lake Placid received the other six, while a short-lived bid from Anchorage, Alaska had none.

On April 25, 1966, the IOC voted to award the 1972 Winter Olympics to Sapporo, Japan, which received a majority of the votes on the first ballot. Salt Lake City was tied with Lahti, Finland, for last place among the four candidate cities, each receiving seven votes.

=== 1976 ===
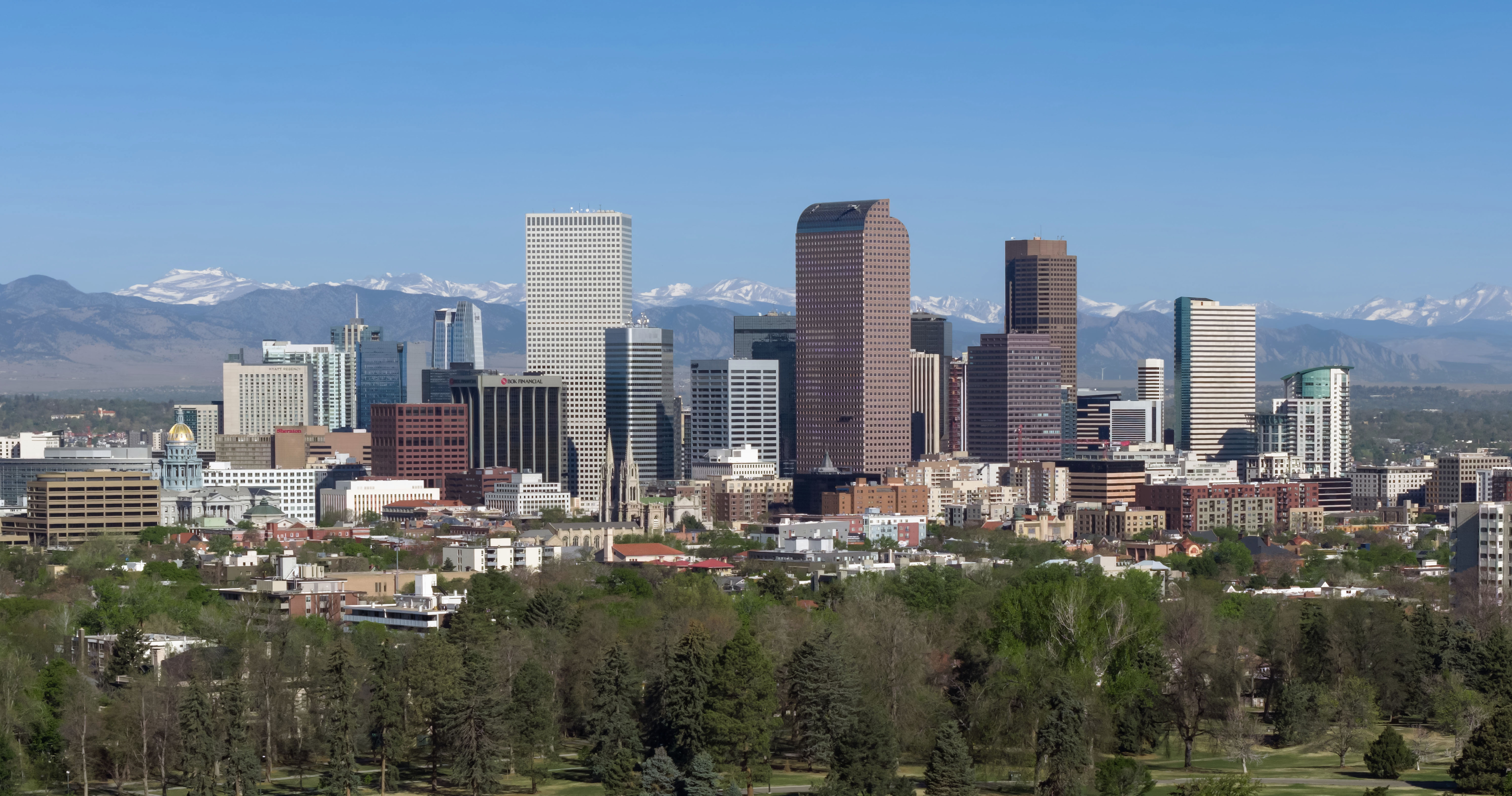
Denver was awarded the 1976 Winter Olympics, but later withdrew as host. Innsbruck replaced Denver as the host city.

On February 26, 1967, the USOC announced at its meeting in Chicago that it had received six proposals for hosting the 1976 Winter Olympics: renewed bids from Salt Lake City and Lake Placid, and applications from Denver, Colorado; Seattle, Washington; Waterbury, Vermont; and the Sugarloaf Mountain ski area in Franklin County, Maine.

The Waterbury bid was made without the support of local and state officials, and its organizer did not respond to a questionnaire before a deadline on June 1. The USOC officially removed it from consideration on September 10. Maine governor Kenneth M. Curtis withdrew the state's bid on November 28, three days before the USOC's deadline to submit a detailed hosting plan, saying that the organizers were not prepared and preferred to wait until the competition for 1980 to make a more serious bid.

The USOC heard presentations from the remaining four cities in a meeting in New York City on December 17, 1967. In the subsequent voting, Seattle came in last place and was removed after the first ballot, while Salt Lake City was removed after reportedly receiving only nine votes on the second ballot. The final vote was between Denver and Lake Placid, Denver winning with 26 votes to Lake Placid's 17.

Denver won its bid to host the 1976 Winter Olympics at the 70th IOC Session in Amsterdam on May 12, 1970. However, on November 7, 1972, a referendum to fund some of the event's costs with taxpayer money was rejected by Denver voters. On November 15, Denver officially withdrew from hosting duties, becoming the first city to do so. Officials from Salt Lake City, Lake Placid, and two groups from the Lake Tahoe area quickly offered to have their cities step in as a replacement host.

In a meeting on January 4, 1973, in New York City, the USOC unanimously chose Salt Lake City as its replacement nominee over Lake Placid and two bids from the Lake Tahoe area. Lake Placid organizers protested the decision, accusing the USOC of bias toward the West, and decided to appeal directly to the IOC to be considered as a replacement host. A delegation led by Mayor Garn traveled to Washington to request financial assistance for Salt Lake City's bid from the federal government, but did not receive any guarantees of funding. As a result, Salt Lake City withdrew its bid on January 30, five days before the IOC would choose a new host city.

The next day, the USOC nominated Lake Placid as its candidate city. While the IOC had set a deadline of January 15 for all candidate cities to submit their bids, Lake Placid's candidacy was accepted. At its extraordinary session in Lausanne, Switzerland, on February 4, Lake Placid lost to Innsbruck, Austria, which ultimately hosted the 1976 Winter Olympics. Salt Lake City Chamber of Commerce president Fred Ball, who was present at the Lausanne session, later recalled being told that the United States would never be allowed to host the Olympics again after the Denver fiasco.

=== 1980 ===
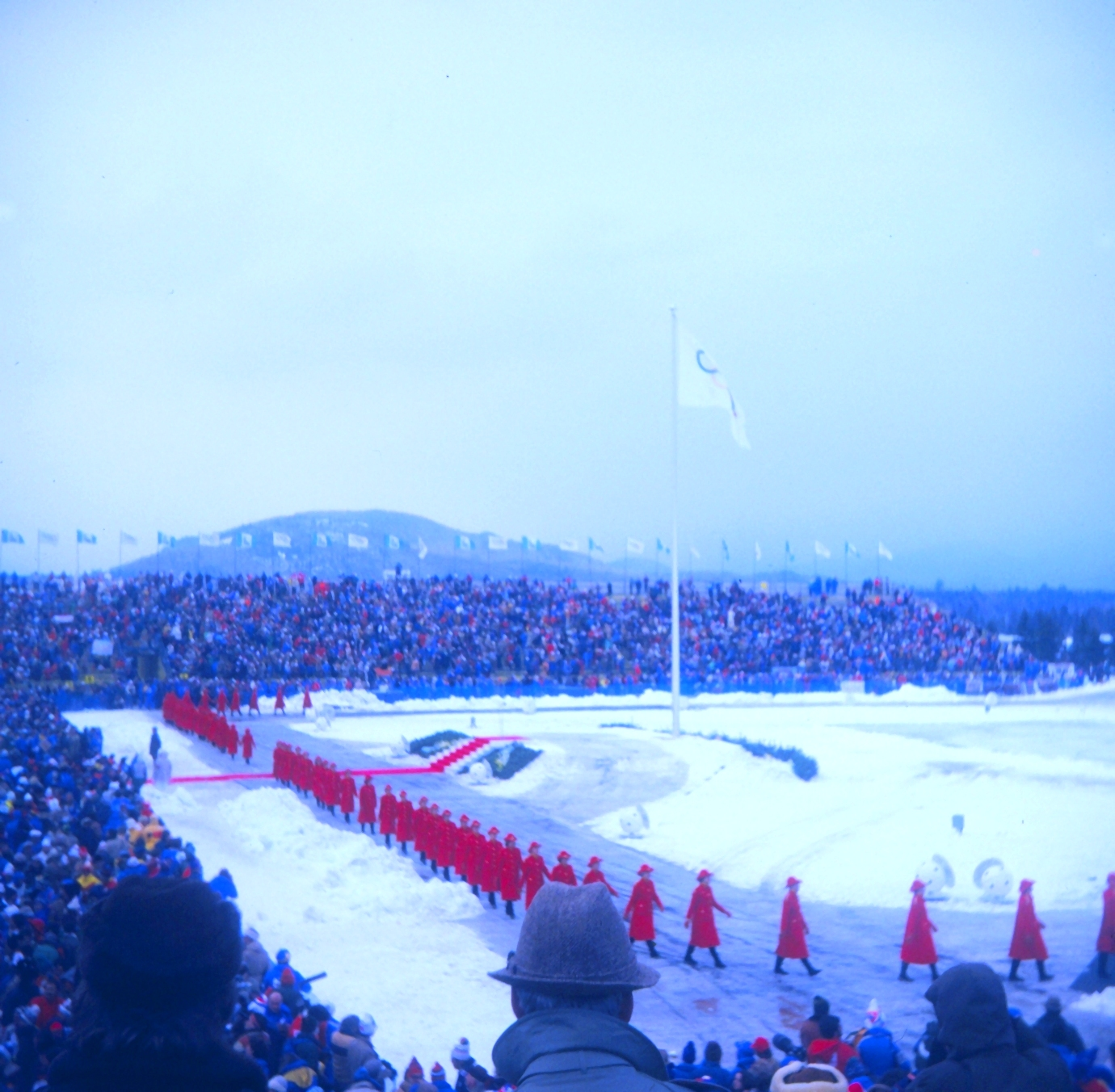
The Opening Ceremony of the 1980 Winter Olympics in Lake Placid.

Lake Placid was the only American candidate seeking the USOC's endorsement for the 1980 Winter Olympics. On November 18, 1973, in a meeting in New York City, the USOC announced that Lake Placid had been tentatively selected as the nominee, alongside Los Angeles for the 1980 Summer Olympics.

Three other cities submitted bids to host the 1980 Winter Olympics: Vancouver–Garibaldi, Canada; Lahti, Finland; and Chamonix, France. Lahti and Chamonix withdrew their bids early in the process. Vancouver's bid failed to garner the support of the British Columbia provincial government, and the city's bid was withdrawn on October 4, 1974, nine days before the IOC was set to choose a host.

The host cities for the 1980 Summer and Winter Olympics were selected at the 75th IOC Session in Vienna, Austria, on October 13, 1974. Since there were no other candidates for the Winter Olympics, Lake Placid was unanimously approved as the host. This also affected the outcome of the Summer Olympics host vote (see § 1980), as the only two candidates there were Moscow and Los Angeles. While many IOC members had misgivings about awarding an Olympics to the Soviet Union, the committee wanted to avoid giving both Games to the United States, so Moscow was chosen as the host of the 1980 Summer Olympics.

=== 1992 ===
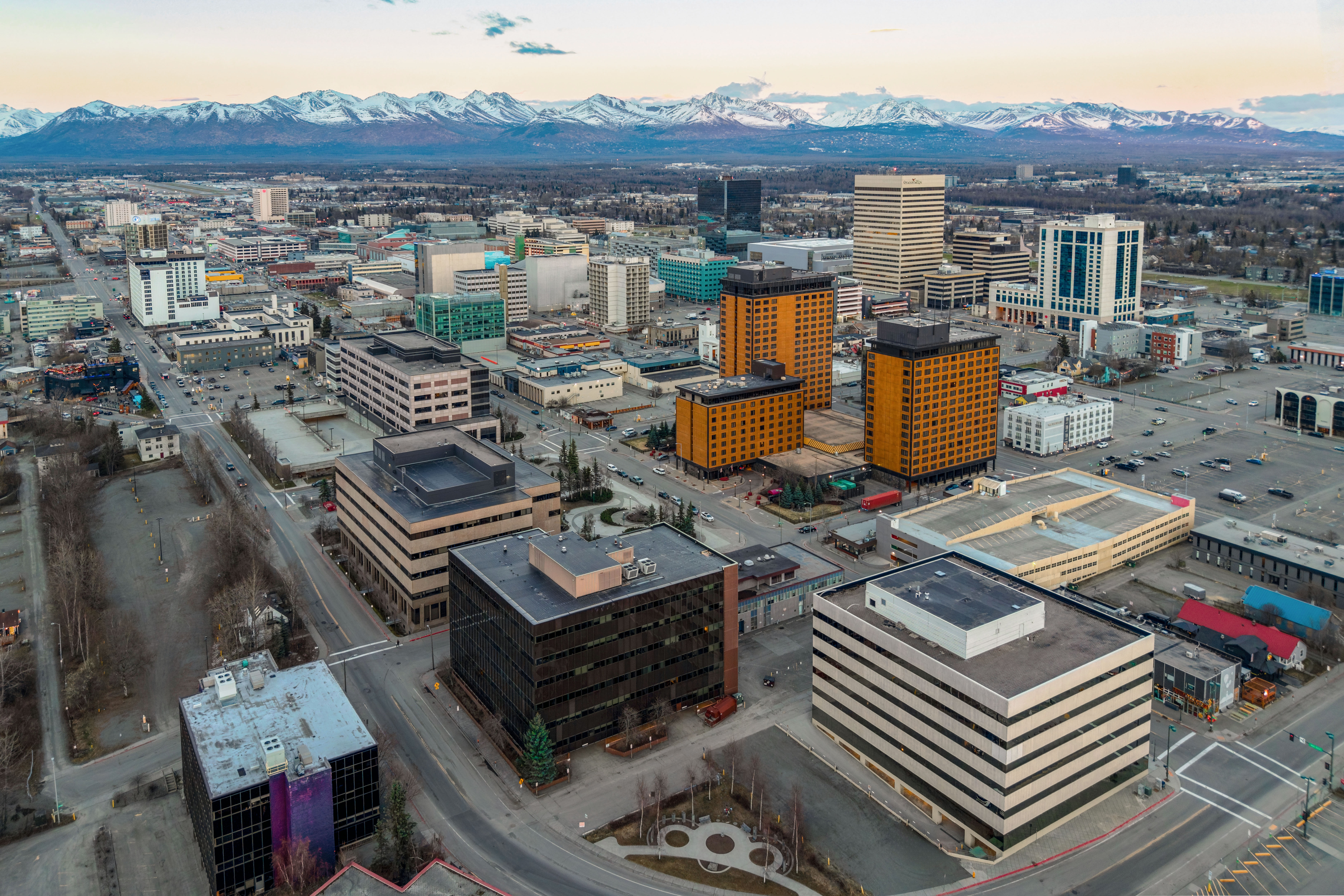
Anchorage made bids for the 1992 and 1994 Winter Olympics, losing to Albertville and Lillehammer respectively.

After the 1988 Winter Olympics were awarded to Calgary in nearby Canada in 1981, the USOC considered it unlikely that the next event would also be held in North America. However, it was thought that bidding for the 1992 Winter Olympics would give the U.S. candidate city extra time to prepare for a more serious bid to host the next Winter Olympics, which were then expected to occur in 1996. As a result, there was substantial competition for the USOC's nomination, with five cities entering the bidding: Anchorage, Lake Placid, Portland, Reno–Lake Tahoe, and Salt Lake City. Anchorage was the last of these to enter the race, being made aware of the USOC's plans in April 1985, just two months before a candidate city was to be chosen. Portland dropped out of contention in May, intending to focus on a bid for 1996. The other four cities made presentations to the Executive Board of the USOC during its annual meeting in Indianapolis, on June 15, 1985. While the exact results of the Board's vote that afternoon were not disclosed, Anchorage was selected quickly, reportedly on the first ballot.

The host city for the 1992 Winter Olympics was chosen at the 91st IOC Session in Lausanne, Switzerland, on October 17, 1986. Of the seven candidate cities, Anchorage was the second to be eliminated from contention, receiving fewer votes than supporters had expected. The games were ultimately awarded to Albertville, France. Also, during the same IOC meeting, it was decided that future Winter Olympics would be held in alternate even years from the Summer Olympics, meaning that the Winter Olympics after 1992 would be held in 1994, not 1996 as previously expected. Within 10 minutes of the announcement that Albertville had been selected, an Anchorage 1992 exhibit in the convention hall was modified to read "1994", and the Anchorage Organizing Committee began filing paperwork for a 1994 candidacy later that day.

=== 1994 ===
At the first USOC meeting following the 1992 host selection, held on November 23, 1986, in Sparks, Nevada, the board nominated Anchorage as the U.S. candidate city for 1994. Despite protests from organizers in Portland, Reno–Tahoe, and Salt Lake City, the board members voted 44–14 to select Anchorage without any opportunity for presentations from other cities. USOC president Bob Helmick told the meeting that, with only two years to prepare for the next bidding process, Anchorage's recent bidding experience made it the only American city that could win.

The host city for the 1994 Winter Olympics was chosen on September 15, 1988, at the 94th IOC Session in Seoul, South Korea, shortly before the opening of the 1988 Summer Olympics there. Among four candidate cities, Anchorage was the second to be eliminated, while Lillehammer, Norway, was selected as the host city.

=== 1998 ===
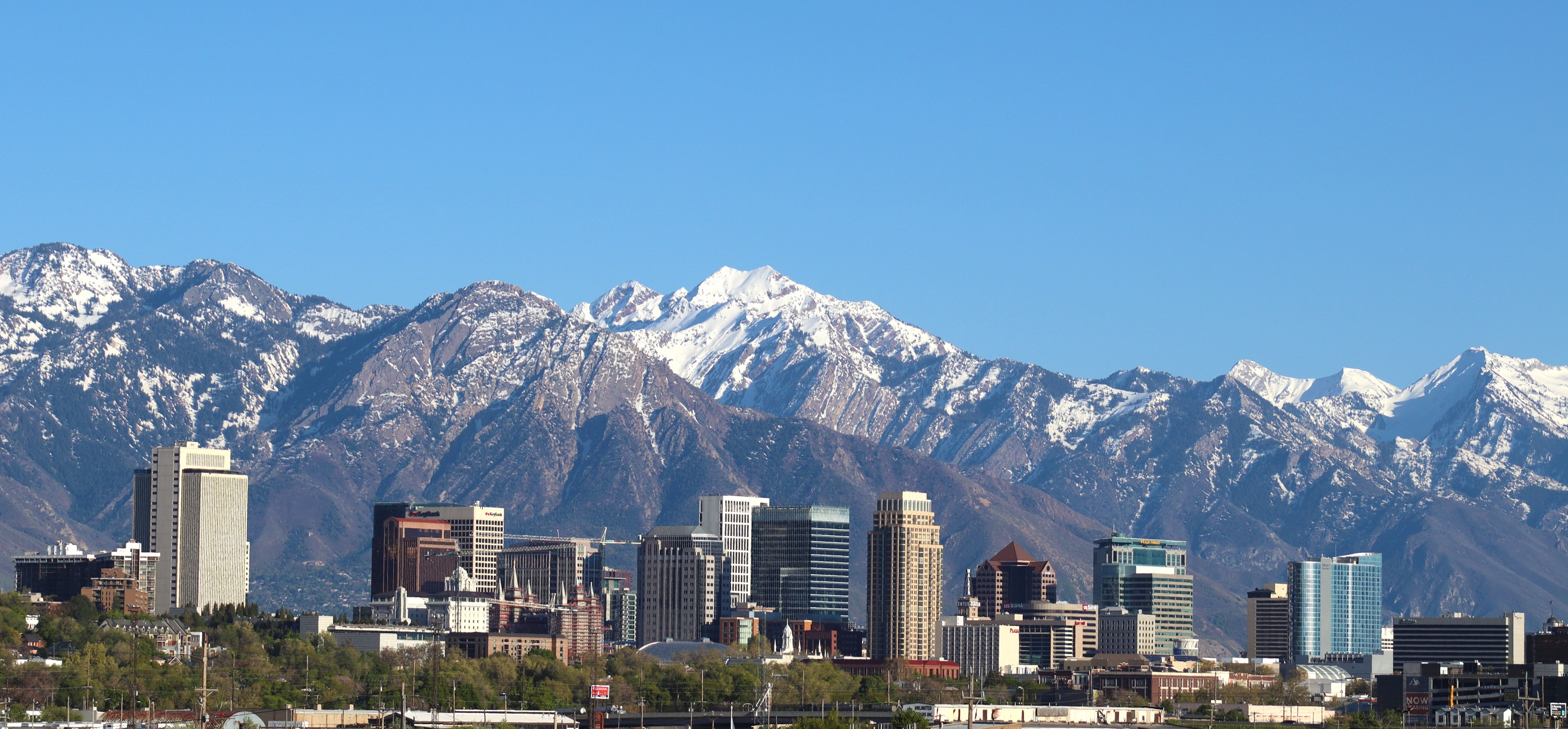
Salt Lake City had bid for the 1998 Winter Olympics but was narrowly defeated by Nagano. Salt Lake City secured the 2002 Winter Olympics a few years later.

In November 1988, the USOC created new rules for Winter Olympic host nominees, requiring all candidates to begin construction on sports facilities before the IOC voted on whether to award it the Olympics. This was done to ensure that, whether the city won the Games or not, the U.S. would gain state-of-the-art training facilities for winter sports with less popularity. Anchorage, which had been the USOC's favored choice in the previous two host selection processes, did not have a plan for financing the construction of these venues without first receiving the international broadcasting contracts that would go to the host city organizing committee upon winning its bid. Anchorage supporters accused the USOC of being more concerned with creating new training facilities that would be easily accessible to the contiguous United States rather than actually hosting the Olympics. USOC president Bob Helmick admitted that new training facilities were "a desperate, critical need" and "more critical than getting the Games for this country."

The USOC's Executive Board met in Des Moines, Iowa, on June 4, 1989, to choose the U.S. candidate city for the 1998 Winter Olympics. Before the final vote, the USOC agreed that the American candidate for 1998, if it was not selected as the host city, would be allowed to bid for 2002 without having to compete against other U.S. cities. The four candidates presenting to the board were Anchorage, Denver, Reno–Sparks–Tahoe, and Salt Lake City. Lake Placid had removed itself from contention in March, its representatives saying that the USOC clearly preferred a site in the West. Klamath Falls, Oregon, had also submitted a bid but withdrew it in May, after learning that candidates were required to submit detailed data that the city did not have. Salt Lake City, which had been considered the favorite according to reporting before the vote, was chosen on the second ballot. While the exact numbers of votes each city received were not disclosed, Denver was reportedly eliminated after coming in last place in the first ballot, and Salt Lake City received the majority of votes in the second ballot over Anchorage and Reno.

The host city for the 1998 Winter Olympics was chosen on June 15, 1991, at the 97th IOC Session in Birmingham, England. In the first round of voting, the five cities were nearly evenly matched, all receiving between 15 and 21 votes. Salt Lake City tied for last place with Aosta, Italy, apparently because some IOC members who favored the American bid wanted to show their support for a less popular candidate in the first round. Salt Lake City received two-thirds of votes in a runoff against Aosta, then remained in second place behind Nagano, Japan, in each of the subsequent rounds. On the final ballot, Salt Lake City narrowly lost, with 42 votes against 46, making Nagano the host for 1998. The bid's loss was attributed in part to Atlanta having recently been awarded the 1996 Summer Olympics, and the IOC's reluctance to award two events in quick succession to the same country.

=== 2002 ===
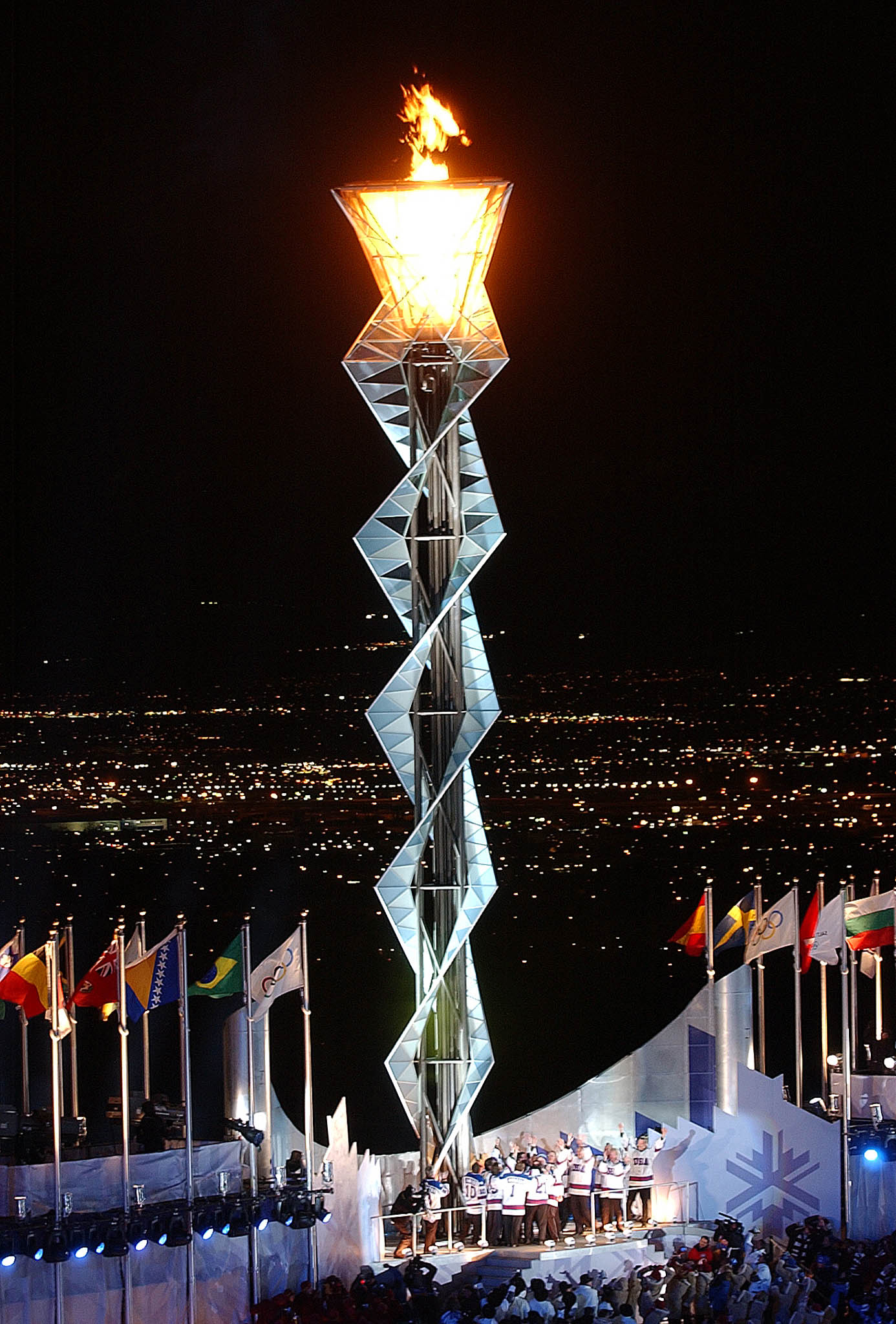
The opening ceremony of the 2002 Winter Olympics in Salt Lake City.

In a meeting in Colorado Springs on November 3, 1991, the USOC board of directors unanimously affirmed that Salt Lake City could bid for the 2002 Winter Olympics without facing competition from other American cities. The USOC also loosened the requirements that it had previously placed on new venue construction, allowing work to be delayed by up to two years. This was done in part because venue construction was behind schedule, and also because the IOC was reportedly considering altering or eliminating bobsleigh and luge in the Winter Olympics program.

The Salt Lake City bid committee cultivated close personal relationships with voting members of the IOC, spending millions of dollars on gifts, transportation, and tuition-free schooling for delegates and their family members. These actions, which were not publicly disclosed until after the 2002 host city selection, later became the focus of the 2002 Winter Olympic bid scandal, which led to the resignations and removals of some IOC members in 1999, as well as the reorganization of the Salt Lake 2002 organizing committee.

A total of 10 cities bid for the 2002 Winter Olympics, the largest number of candidates up to that point. The IOC decided at its Lillehammer session in February 1994 to narrow down the field to four finalists, before choosing a host city from among those four. The shortlist was announced at the Olympic Museum in Lausanne, Switzerland, on January 24, 1995. Salt Lake City was selected as a finalist alongside Östersund, Sweden; Quebec City, Canada; and Sion, Switzerland.

The IOC selected the host city for the 2002 Winter Olympics on June 16, 1995, during the 104th IOC Session in Budapest, Hungary. Salt Lake City was chosen by a majority of IOC members on the first ballot, receiving 54 of the 89 available votes. This was the first time that a city had been awarded the Olympic Games on the first ballot since the 1968 Summer Olympics were given to Mexico City, although Los Angeles had been awarded the 1984 Summer Olympics unanimously because it was the only candidate city.

=== 2014 ===
In June 2000, the Adirondack Sports Commission and the Greater Montreal Tourism and Convention Bureau proposed a joint bid for the 2014 Winter Olympics, shared by Lake Placid and the Canadian city of Montreal (which had previously hosted the 1976 Summer Olympics).

Shortly after the 2002 Winter Olympics ended in Salt Lake City, USOC spokesman Bob Condron said that 2014 was the earliest possible chance for another Winter Olympics in the United States, since bidding was well underway for the 2010 Winter Olympics. Condron also said that the USOC would wait until after the 2004 Summer Olympics to begin seriously considering 2014 bid cities. Rick Mystrom, who had led the Anchorage Organizing Committee for 1992 and 1994 and later served as the city's mayor, expressed interest in another Alaskan bid.

The only bid officially submitted to the USOC for 2014 was from the Reno–Tahoe Winter Games Organizing Committee, which announced its candidacy in April 2002. The bid was still active in April 2005, when the committee asked for $200,000 in state funding to submit an application to the IOC. However, after the failure of the New York City bid for the 2012 Summer Olympics in July 2005, the USOC said it would not consider a bid for 2014, instead focusing its attention on a bid for the 2016 Summer Olympics (see § 2016).

=== 2018 ===
The Metro Denver Sports Commission began exploring the possibility of a bid for the 2018 Winter Olympics as early as 2003. The commission approached Vail Ski Resort for potential inclusion as a venue in the bid. The Reno–Tahoe Winter Games Coalition, chaired by Nevada lieutenant governor Brian Krolicki, made detailed preparations for its own bid proposal. Lake Placid and Salt Lake City also expressed interest in a potential 2018 bid.

However, the USOC said that it would not consider selecting a candidate city for 2018, continuing to prioritize the Chicago bid for the 2016 Summer Olympics instead. The Reno–Tahoe Winter Games Coalition asked the USOC to reconsider this decision after the Chicago 2016 bid failed, but no bid was submitted before the IOC's application deadline on October 16, 2009, two weeks after the 2016 decision.

=== 2022 ===
Bozeman, Denver, Reno–Tahoe, and Salt Lake City expressed interest in bidding for the 2022 Winter Olympics. As with the 2020 Summer Olympics (see § 2020), the USOC said that it would not submit a bid until its revenue-sharing agreement with the IOC was renegotiated. The resolution of that dispute in May 2012 meant that the USOC could consider bidding for 2022. However, in July 2012, the USOC announced that it would not submit a bid for 2022, preferring to focus on 2024 or 2026. When few other candidates emerged for the 2022 Winter Olympics, USOC chairman Larry Probst said in June 2014 that it was "highly, highly unlikely" that the committee would reconsider its decision not to bid.

=== 2026 ===
Several U.S. cities expressed interest in bidding for the 2026 Winter Olympics. A Boston 2026 campaign was created, but was cut short when the city became the USOC candidate for the 2024 Summer Olympics in January 2015. Lake Placid proposed a joint bid with Quebec City, Canada, in 2015, but received no support from either the USOC or the Canadian Olympic Committee in this effort.

In October 2017, an Olympic/Paralympic Exploratory Committee was created in Salt Lake City, Utah. Since Los Angeles had recently been awarded the 2028 Summer Olympics, it was considered unlikely that an American city would be chosen for 2026. Salt Lake City officials said that they were more interested in bidding for 2030. However, since Los Angeles had bid for the 2024 Summer Olympics and then had been awarded the 2028 Games without a further bid process, the Utah committee believed it was necessary to bid for 2026 in case the IOC was planning to award the 2030 Games in the same way. On February 7, 2018, Utah governor Gary Herbert signed a resolution supporting the bid, which had been unanimously approved by the state legislature. The next day, while attending the 2018 Winter Olympics in Pyeongchang, South Korea, USOC chair Larry Probst said that no American bid would be submitted for 2026 before the IOC's deadline of March 31, 2018.

=== 2030 and 2034 ===
Immediately after the USOC ruled out a bid for 2026 in February 2018, three cities were considering applying to host the 2030 Winter Olympics: Denver, Reno–Tahoe, and Salt Lake City. The Reno–Tahoe Winter Games Coalition withdrew from consideration in November 2018. Denver, aiming to avoid the political issues that forced the cancellation of the 1976 Winter Olympics in its city, proposed an entirely privately-funded Games, while Salt Lake City touted the low cost of reusing its 2002 facilities. The USOC chose Salt Lake City over Denver in December 2018.

Salt Lake City, and other places around the world interested in bidding for the 2030 Winter Olympics, were the first to participate in a new bidding process introduced at the 134th IOC Session in Lausanne, Switzerland, in June 2019. Under this procedure, there would be no more host city selection votes. Instead, a Future Host Commission would maintain a "continuous dialogue" with all interested parties, choosing a preferred host when it believed a city was ready, and then submitting that one candidate to be approved or rejected by the full voting body of the IOC.

Hosting duties for the 2030 Winter Olympics were set to be awarded at the 141st IOC Session in Mumbai, India, in October 2023. However, IOC members believed that more time was needed to make a decision, and it was decided that the hosts for both 2030 and 2034 would be chosen at the 142nd IOC Session, in Paris on the eve of the Summer Olympics in July 2024.

In November 2023, the IOC's Future Host Commission recommended that the 2030 Winter Olympics be held in the French Alps, and the 2034 Games in Salt Lake City. The commission visited Salt Lake City in April 2024 for further examination. The IOC Executive Board approved the commission's findings in June. On July 24, 2024, at the Paris session, IOC members voted on the Salt Lake City proposal. 83 of the 95 voting members approved the measure, with six opposed and another six abstaining. Salt Lake City thus became the host of the 2034 Winter Olympics.

=== 2042 ===
In March 2026, the state of New York started exploring the possibility of a joint New York City-Lake Placid bid for a future edition of the Winter Olympics. Lake Placid previously hosted the 1932 and 1980 Winter Olympics. New York City placed a bid for the 2012 Summer Olympics, but lost to London. In June 2026, Governor Kathy Hochul formed an exploratory committee to study a potential bid for the 2042 Winter Olympics.
