= Champ, Missouri =

- Village
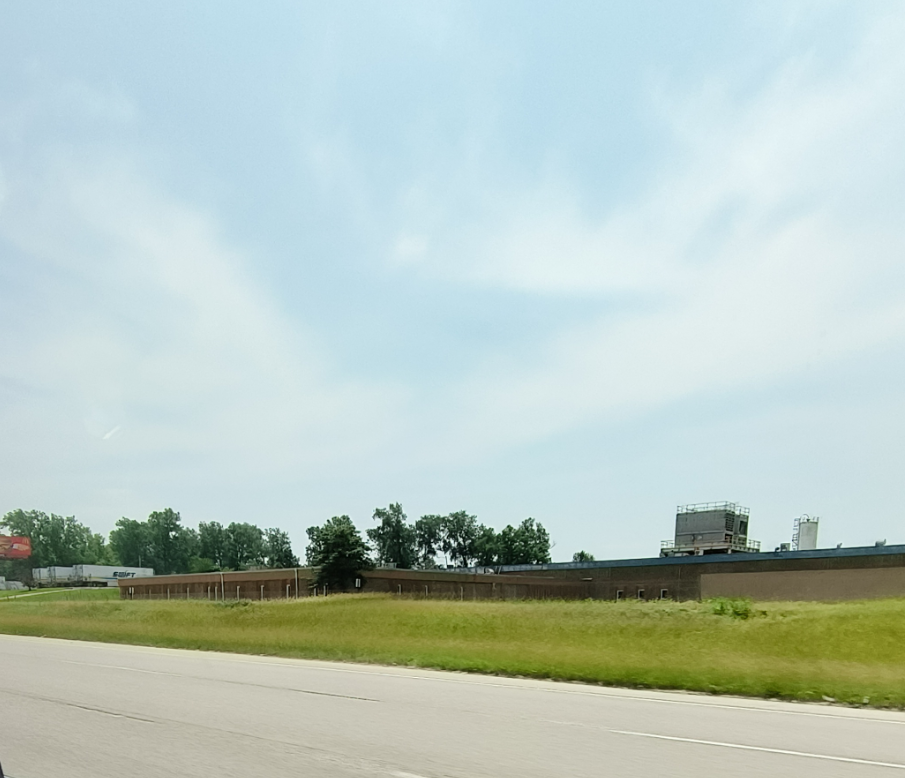
- Champ in 2025

- Location of Champ, Missouri
- Coordinates: 38°44′37″N 90°27′13″W
- Country: United States
- State: Missouri
- County: St. Louis
- Township: Northwest
- Founded: 1959

Area
  - Total: 0.80 sq mi (2.07 km^{2})
  - Land: 0.80 sq mi (2.07 km^{2})
  - Water: 0 sq mi (0.00 km^{2})
- Elevation: 558 ft (170 m)

Population (2020)
  - Total: 10
  - Density: 12.5/sq mi (4.83/km^{2})
- Time zone: UTC-6 (Central (CST))
  - Summer (DST): UTC-5 (CDT)
- FIPS code: 29-13078
- GNIS feature ID: 2397599

Champ is a village in Northwest Township, St. Louis County, Missouri, United States. The population was 10 at the 2020 census.

== History ==
Champ was founded in 1959 by Bill Bangert, a former track and field athlete who was once mayor of Berkeley. Bangert purchased the land from local businessman Norman Champ, although he later said that the community is not named after the former landowner but after the abbreviation of the word "champion". The village was founded with the intention of building the world's largest domed stadium, seating 115,000 and potentially hosting a future Olympic Games, alongside a large indoor shopping center and other tourist attractions. The U.S. Olympic Committee gave some support to the idea, nominating Champ as its candidate to host the 1971 Pan American Games. Bangert believed that incorporating a small village whose only permanent residents were his close relatives and business partners would allow him to issue municipal bonds for his own project. However, these efforts were blocked by the state of Missouri, which also unsuccessfully attempted to dissolve the village. Bangert was elected as the mayor of Champ for 18 years. After accumulating millions of dollars in debts from his failed efforts to build the stadium complex, he left the area and moved to California. The majority of the land area of Champ is currently a landfill, which opened in 1974. The remainder encompasses the six households listed in the 2010 census and Grace Church.

== Geography ==
According to the United States Census Bureau, the village has a total area of 0.81 square miles (2.10 km^{2}), all land.

== Demographics ==
Historical population
Census	Pop.	Note	%±
1960	50		—
1970	19		−62.0%
1980	28		47.4%
1990	11		−60.7%
2000	12		9.1%
2010	13		8.3%
2020	10		−23.1%
U.S. Decennial Census

Champ village, Missouri – Racial and ethnic composition Note: the US Census treats Hispanic/Latino as an ethnic category. This table excludes Latinos from the racial categories and assigns them to a separate category. Hispanics/Latinos may be of any race.
Race / Ethnicity (NH = Non-Hispanic)	Pop 2000	Pop 2010	Pop 2020	% 2000	% 2010	% 2020
White alone (NH)	12	13	8	66.67%	100.00%	80.00%
Black or African American alone (NH)	0	0	0	0.00%	0.00%	0.00%
Native American or Alaska Native alone (NH)	0	0	0	0.00%	0.00%	0.00%
Asian alone (NH)	0	0	0	0.00%	0.00%	0.00%
Native Hawaiian or Pacific Islander alone (NH)	0	0	0	0.00%	0.00%	0.00%
Other race alone (NH)	0	0	0	0.00%	0.00%	0.00%
Mixed race or Multiracial (NH)	4	0	1	33.33%	0.00%	10.00%
Hispanic or Latino (any race)	0	0	1	0.00%	0.00%	10.00%
Total	12	13	10	100.00%	100.00%	100.00%

=== 2010 census ===
At the 2010 census there were 13 people, 6 households, and 3 families living in the village. The population density was 16.0 inhabitants per square mile (6.2/km^{2}). There were 6 housing units at an average density of 7.4 per square mile (2.9/km^{2}). The racial makeup of the village was 100.0% White. Of the 6 households 16.7% had children under the age of 18 living with them, 50.0% were married couples living together, and 50.0% were non-families. 50.0% of households were made up of individuals. The average household size was 2.17 and the average family size was 3.33.

The median age in the village was 57.5 years. 15.4% of residents were under the age of 18; 7.7% were between the ages of 18 and 24; 23.1% were from 25 to 44; 30.8% were from 45 to 64; and 23.1% were 65 or older. The gender makeup of the village was 53.8% male and 46.2% female.

=== 2000 census ===
At the 2000 census there were 12 people, 4 households, and 4 families living in the village. The population density was 14.4 people per square mile (5.5/km^{2}). There were 6 housing units at an average density of 7.2 per square mile (2.8/km^{2}). The racial makeup of the village was 66.67% White, and 33.33% from two or more races. Of the 4 households 50.0% had children under the age of 18 living with them, 100.0% were married couples living together, and 0.0% were non-families. No households were one person and none had someone living alone who was 65 or older. The average household size was 3.00 and the average family size was 3.00.

The age distribution was 25.0% under the age of 18, 8.3% from 18 to 24, 33.3% from 25 to 44, 25.0% from 45 to 64, and 8.3% 65 or older. The median age was 36 years. For every 100 females, there were 140.0 males. For every 100 females age 18 and over, there were 125.0 males.

The median household income was $75,487 and the median family income was $75,487. Males had a median income of $75,487 versus $0 for females. The per capita income for the village was $18,762. None of the population and none of the families were below the poverty line.
