= Bids for the 1971 Pan American Games =

Overview
- VI Pan American Games
- Winner: Cali; Runner-up: Santiago; Candidate: Champ

Details
- Committee: PASO

Map
- Location of the bidding cities

Important dates

Decision
- Winner: Cali (12 votes)
- Runner-up: Santiago (11 votes)

Three cities submitted bids to host the 1971 Pan American Games that were recognized by the Pan American Sports Organization. On July 22, 1967, Cali was selected over Santiago and Champ, Missouri by PASO at its general assembly, held at the Manitoba Medical College in Winnipeg, Canada, to host the VI Pan American Games.

== Host city selection ==
Thirty committees took place in the vote in Winnipeg, with Honduras not voting. The debates took place before the Congress of PASO and lasted four hours. At 5:46 PM, President of the Mexican Olympic Committee Josué Sáenz announced the results: Cali 12 votes, Santiago 11 votes, and Champ 6 votes.

1971 Pan American Games bidding results
City	NOC	Round 1
Cali	Colombia	12
Santiago	Chile	11
Champ	United States	6

== Candidate cities ==
=== Cali, Colombia ===
In November 1964, delegates from Colombia announced that Cali would bid to be the host city for the 1971 Pan American Games, a bid that had the support of Governor of Valle del Cauca Humberto González Narváez, the Executive Director of the Vallecaucana Action Unit, and Mayor of Cali Artemo Franco Mejia. On April 8, 1965, the Cali host city committee was formed. The bid received further support from the Colombian Olympic Committee, Mexican Olympic Committee, and multiple Boards and Assemblies of Valle from July to October 1965.

Colombia had its share of success in hosting large sporting events such as the 1946 Central American and Caribbean Games. In response to Chile's remarks on the violent history of Colombia, the country noted the positive impact it would have, pointing out that the games would stabilize the country in that regard. Additionally, the city promised to build an Olympic village if they were awarded the games, and the village would be repurposed as a university campus afterwards.

Finances were also a major focus in Cali's bid. At the time, Colombia had the second richest oil reserves of all Latin American countries, behind Venezuela, giving Colombia a large amount of money in its national treasury. The city made sure it was known, as well, as one spokesman pointed out, "We don't like to say this, but we have the money and they don't." Cali's bid was presented by President of the City Council of Cali Hector Villegas, four of his council members, a senator, and National Olympic officials.

=== Santiago, Chile ===
Santiago boasted its history of hosting large sporting events, such as the 1962 FIFA World Cup, which gave Chilean officials a wealth of experience hosting these types of games. The Mayor of Santiago also made a point to focus on the country's history of peace and non-violence—a point that was made to contrast that of Colombia's history. The city guaranteed an Olympic village if they were selected as the host city. Santiago's bid was presented by Mayor Manuel Fernandez, two Chilean cabinet ministers, and the president and vice-president of the Chilean Olympic Committee.

=== Champ, United States ===
The small town of Champ, adjacent to St. Louis, was a late entry to host the games. The delegation was led by a local businessman William Bangert. He planned to build a $150 million stadium with the capacity to hold 300,000 attendees. Additionally, the town was willing to cover the transportation, accommodation, and food expenses of all the delegation, and even more, President Lyndon B. Johnson had approved $20 million to organize the games. However, Champ was accused of attempting to "buy" votes due to these financial incentives.

Additionally, many believed that since Chicago had hosted the 1959 Pan American Games, the United States should not hold the 1971 games, as President of the PASO José de Jesús Clark Flóres even noted, "According to Rule 23 of the PASO regulations: 'when two or more member countries of the PASO aspire to host a Pan American Games, they will prefer a country that has never organized them.'"
