= Northwest Township, St. Louis County, Missouri =

Township in St. Louis County, Missouri, U.S.

Coordinates: 38°45′0″N 90°24′39″W

Northwest Township is a township in St. Louis County, in the U.S. state of Missouri. Its population was 32,245 as of the 2010 census.
