= Chinese home run =

Old baseball term for a home run that barely clears the nearest outfield fence

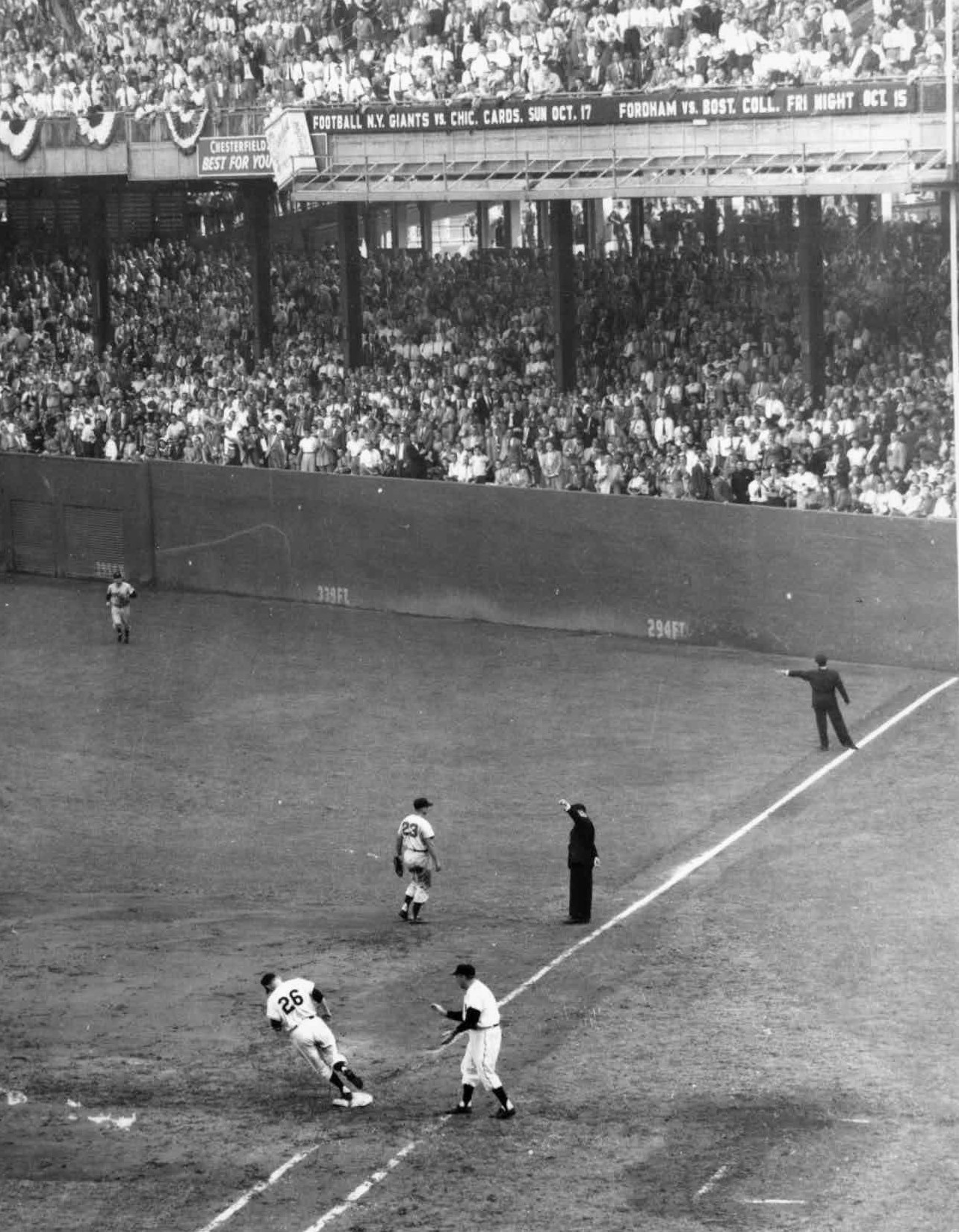
The short right field fence at the Polo Grounds

Chinese home run, also a Chinese homer, Harlem home run, Polo home run, or Pekinese poke, is a derogatory and archaic baseball term for a hit that just barely clears the outfield fence at its closest distance to home plate. It is essentially the shortest home run possible in the ballpark in question, particularly if the park has an atypically short fence. The term was most commonly used in reference to home runs hit along the right field foul line at the Polo Grounds, home of the New York Giants, where that distance was short even by contemporary standards. When the Giants moved to San Francisco in 1958, the Los Angeles Coliseum, temporary home of the newly relocated Los Angeles Dodgers, gained the same reputation for four seasons until the team took up residence in its permanent home at Dodger Stadium in 1962. Following two seasons of use by the expansion New York Mets in the early 1960s, the Polo Grounds were demolished, and the term gradually dropped out of use.

Why these home runs were called "Chinese" is not definitely known, but it is believed to have reflected an early 20th-century perception that Chinese immigrants to the United States did the menial labor they were consigned to with a bare minimum of adequacy, and were content with minimal reward for it. A Tad Dorgan cartoon has been proposed as the likely origin, but that has not been proven; the earliest known usages are in a 1927 newspaper account of a Pittsburgh Pirates–Philadelphia Phillies major-league game, and in a 1919 newspaper account of a Los Angeles Angels–Sacramento Senators minor-league game. In the 1950s, an extended take on the term in the New York Daily News led the city's Chinese-American community to ask sportswriters not to use it. This perception of ethnic insensitivity has further contributed to its disuse.

It has been used to disparage not only the hit but the batter, since it implies minimal effort on his part. Giants' outfielder Mel Ott, who hit many such home runs in the Polo Grounds during his career, was a frequent target of this as his physique and unusual batting stance were not those associated with a power hitter. The hit most frequently recalled as a Chinese home run was the three-run pinch hit walk-off shot by Dusty Rhodes that won the first game of the 1954 World Series for the Giants on their way to a sweep of the Cleveland Indians.

A secondary meaning, which continues today, is of a foul ball that travels high and far, often behind home plate. However, this appears to be confined to sandlot and high-school games in New England. Research into this usage suggests that it may not, in fact, have had anything initially to do with Chinese people, but is instead a corruption of "Chaney's home run", from a foul by a player of that name which supposedly won a game when the ball thus hit, the only one remaining, could not be found.

== Etymology ==
As early as the late 19th century, baseball players and fans had recognized that parks with shorter distances to the foul poles and back fence allowed for home runs that were regarded as undeserved or unearned, since fly balls of the same distance hit closer to or in center field could easily be caught for outs. In 1896, Jim Nolan of The Daily News of Galveston, Texas, reporting on the expansion of the local ballpark, wrote: "The enlarged size of the grounds will enable the outfielders to cover more ground and take in fly balls that went for cheap home runs before. Batsmen will have to earn their triples and home runs hereafter".

In 2010, Jonathan E. Lighter, editor of the Historical Dictionary of American Slang, posted on the American Dialect Society's (ADS) listserv that he had found the earliest use of the term "Chinese home run" for that type of hit in a Charleroi, Pennsylvania, newspaper's 1927 account of a National League game between the Philadelphia Phillies and Pittsburgh Pirates: "The Phillies went into a deadlock on Cy's Chinese homer only to see the Buccos hammer over four runs a little later."

An article in the Los Angeles Times in August 1919 used the term while summarizing a minor league game in the Pacific Coast League between the Los Angeles Angels and Sacramento Senators. "Ellis hit a tremendous Chinese home run just back of Pinelli's head", sportswriter Ed O'Malley wrote, in describing a home run by the Angels' Rube Ellis that, apparently, had not been hit very far past Babe Pinelli, the Senators' third baseman.

The above instances predate the earliest use that Paul Dickson found when researching The Dickson Baseball Dictionary. In a 1930 story for The Washington Post, writer Brian Bell quoted Dan Howley, manager of the Cincinnati Reds, defending the hitting prowess of Harry Heilmann, who was then finishing his career under Howley. "[They] were real home runs", Howley said, pointing out how far from the field they had landed. "They were not Chinese home runs in that short bleacher at right", referring to the back fence on the foul line at the Polo Grounds, a mere 258 feet (79 m) from home.

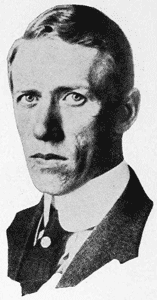
Cartoonist Tad Dorgan may have popularized the term.

Dickson reiterated the results of two attempts in the 1950s to determine the term's origin, following its widespread use in stories. After Rhodes' home run, Joseph Sheehan of The New York Times made the first attempt. His research took him to Garry Schumacher, a former baseball writer then working as the Giants' press relations executive, who had himself been known for creating some baseball terms that went into wide use. Schumacher told him that he believed Tad Dorgan, a cartoonist popular in the early decades of the 20th century, had introduced it, probably in one of his widely read Indoor Sports panels. It has, however, been suggested that Dorgan disliked the Giants and their manager, John McGraw, which may have also given him a reason to coin a disparaging term for short home runs. (However, Lighter said in a follow-up post to the ADS listserv that he had found no evidence Dorgan coined the term, or even that the cartoonist had heard it.)

During the 1910s, when Dorgan's cartoon was at its most popular, there was an ongoing debate over the Chinese Exclusion Act, the first immigration law in U.S. history to bar entry to the country on the basis of ethnicity or national origin. Chinese immigrants who had entered prior to its 1882 passage remained, however, and were often hired as "coolies", doing menial labor for low pay. "The idea was to express a cheap home run as Chinese then represented what was cheap, such as their labor", lexicographer David Shulman told Dickson. This was in keeping with a bevy of other contemporary such usages, such as calling a Ford automobile a "Chinese Rolls-Royce". Sheehan also wrote that it carried the additional "connotation of a homer of little account." He did not think that Dorgan, known for the gentleness of his satire, had meant it to be insulting, especially since he had two adopted sons from China.

In 1958, when the Giants moved to San Francisco and left the Polo Grounds, J. G. Taylor Spink, publisher of The Sporting News, made another attempt to find the source of the term. He agreed with Sheehan that it had originated with Dorgan and the association of Chinese immigrants with cheap labor. However, his article was reprinted in the Los Angeles Times, and readers there wrote in with alternative suggestions.

One was from Travis McGregor, a retired San Francisco sportswriter. In his recollection, the term had been in use on the West Coast in the years just before World War I. He attributed it to a joke derived from an aspiring Chinese-American sportswriter covering minor league games in the Pacific Coast League, whom the typists at newspapers simply credited as "Mike Murphy" since they couldn't properly transcribe his name. "He had a keen sense of humor, a degree from Stanford and a great yen to be a newspaperman", McGregor wrote in his own letter to The Sporting News. As a result of his education, he spoke with no accent, but still used affected syntax. "He was a one-man show at baseball games ... for two or three seasons, an Oriental Fred Allen", according to McGregor. Once, he recalled, Murphy described one batter as "wave at ball like Mandarin with fan".

This phrase stuck in the minds of the other sportswriters in attendance and, McGregor suggested, it spread among all the league's writers, becoming a catch phrase. "The old Oakland park's short fence caught the most of it from Mike, and his 'Mandarin fan' waving balls out of the park were knocked back to 'Chinese homers'", said McGregor. A number of Murphy's comments were adapted into cartoons by Dorgan, a native of San Francisco, and from there the term migrated into print. McGregor believed that either Ed Hughes or Harry Smith of the San Francisco Chronicle were the first to do so, and better-known writers like Ring Lardner and Damon Runyon may have picked it up from them and popularized it nationwide.

Sportswriters extended the idea. Shulman wrote in 1930 of hearing them talk about short pop flies as "Chinese line drives". Texas Leaguers, or high bloop singles that fell between the infielders and outfielders, were likewise called "Japanese line drives" when hit in Pacific Coast League games.

There have been other theories to explain how home runs that barely cleared the fence came to be called "Chinese". Dan Schlossberg, a veteran Associated Press baseball writer, accepts the Dorgan story but also reports that Bill McGeehan, then sports editor of the New York Tribune, had in 1920 likened the right field fence at the Polo Grounds to the Great Wall of China: "thick, low, and not very formidable", suggesting that that may also have had something to do with the term's coinage. Russ Hodges, who called Giants games on the radio in both New York and San Francisco, told the latter city's Call-Bulletin in 1958 that the term came into use from the supposed tendency of Chinese gamblers watching games at the Polo Grounds in the early 20th century to cluster in seats next to the left field foul pole. "Any hit that went out at that point", he explained, "was followed by cries of 'There goes one for the Chinese'".

Another Sporting News columnist, Joe Falls, devoted a column to the term and solicited theories of its origin from readers. Some suggested that it had something to do with the "short jump" in Chinese checkers, or that since Chinese people were generally short, that short home runs would be named after them. Another reader claimed that the term arose because the outfield seats in the Polo Grounds supposedly stuck out in ways that suggested a pagoda.

== History ==
The term appears to have caught on quickly in baseball throughout the 1920s. By the 1950s, it was still in use but its connotations were no longer clear, and its use after one notoriously short home run that won a World Series game sparked a protest. After the 1964 demolition of the Polo Grounds, with its notoriously short right field fence, the term largely fell from use.

=== 1920s–1954: Mel Ott ===
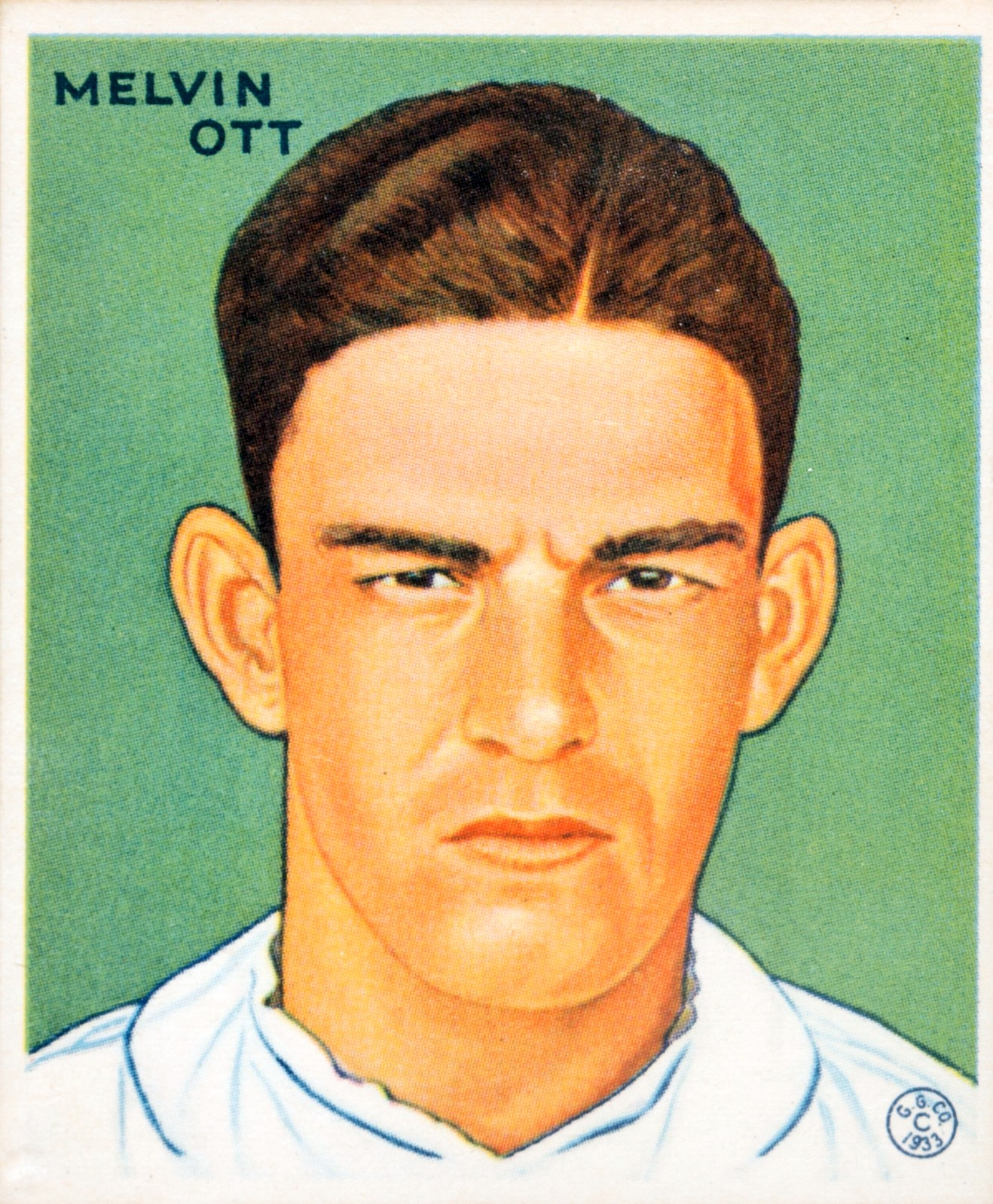
Mel Ott, on a 1933 baseball card

After establishing itself in baseball's argot, "Chinese home run" continued to be used, even while most of the other derogatory terms related to the Chinese fell from use; the American public opinion began to see the Chinese people in a more sympathetic light due to China's struggles against Japanese domination during the 1930s, struggles that led to the U.S. and China becoming allies during World War II. Within baseball it was frequently associated with the Giants and the Polo Grounds, with its short right-field fence. One Giant in particular, outfielder Mel Ott, was sometimes described as the master of the Chinese home run, since he hit many of his 511 career home runs (a National League record at the time of his retirement) to right field in the team's home stadium (although often to the upper deck) during his 1926–45 playing career.

The association likely developed because not only did Ott not have the physique commonly associated with power hitters, he used an unusual batting technique. The 5-foot-9-inch (175 cm) outfielder preceded his swings by dropping his hands, lifting his front leg and stepping forward on it as the pitch came. Since that defied accepted baseball wisdom about how to hit home runs, it was assumed that Ott was focusing on the short right field fence, and sportswriters often kidded him about this. Ott, who worked on his technique extensively, usually responded that if it was so easy, other batters in the league should have been able to hit even more of those home runs when visiting the Giants. It has also been pointed out that Ott's best-known home run, which won his team the 1933 World Series from the Washington Senators, was hit in Griffith Stadium, not the Polo Grounds, and over a longer fence.

=== 1954–1957: Dusty Rhodes ===
While Bobby Thomson's 1951 pennant-clinching "Shot Heard 'Round The World" has sometimes been described as a Chinese home run, the best-known such hit by a Giant in the Polo Grounds also won an extra-inning World Series game, and may have proved decisive in eventually winning that series for the Giants. In the 10th inning of Game 1 of the 1954 World Series against the heavily favored Cleveland Indians, Giants' manager Leo Durocher, on a hunch, sent in Dusty Rhodes to pinch hit for Monte Irvin. The left-handed Rhodes hit a walk-off home run just over the right field fence, giving the Giants the three runs they needed to win the game.

The extensive media coverage led to discussions of both the term, such as Sheehan's in The New York Times, and Chinese home runs themselves. Since the late 1940s, there had been complaints from older fans that they were part of the decline of the game. "Ballplayers played ball in those days", said a writer in a 1948 column in the Lowell, Massachusetts, Sun. "Now they pop a Chinese home run into an overhanging balcony and the crowd thinks it's wonderful". Two years later, Richard Maney included the Chinese home run among the failings of the postwar game in a Times piece.

That 1954 game is chiefly remembered today for Willie Mays' catch of a Vic Wertz fly to deep center in the eighth inning, which broke up an Indians' rally that might otherwise have led to them winning the game. It had happened because of the 483-foot (147 m) distance of the Polo Grounds' fences in that area, its other peculiarity, which offset the advantage to hitters of its short right-field fence. The Indians attributed their upset loss to the park's unusual dimensions. "The longest out and the shortest home run of the season beat us, that's all", Indians manager Al López told The Washington Post. The team was unable to recover psychologically, and the Giants swept them three games later.

Sportswriters made much humor of the "Chinese" aspect of Rhodes' home run. One newspaper's photographer posed him reading a Chinese newspaper, apparently looking for an account of his hit. The New York Times called it "more Chinese than chow mein and just as Chinese as Shanghai and Peiping".

Dick Young extended this trope the furthest in his Daily News coverage:

The story of the Giants' 5–2 win over Cleveland in yesterday's World Series opener should be written vertically, from top to bottom ... in Chinese hieroglyphics. It was won on a 10th inning homer that was not only sudden death but pure murder ... right out of a Charlie Chan yarn. Ming Toy Rhodes, sometimes called Dusty by his Occidental friends, was honorable person who, as a pinch hitter, delivered miserable bundle of wet wash to first row in rightfield of Polo Grounds, some 259 1/2 feet down the road from the laundry.

This unrestrained use of Chinese stereotypes, both in content and phrasing, drew a protest. Shavey Lee, long considered the unofficial "mayor" of New York's Chinatown, collected signatures on a petition (in Chinese) from himself and other members of the city's Chinese American community, demanding not just Young but all sportswriters stop using the term, and presented it to the Giants' secretary Eddie Brannick. "It isn't the fault of the Chinese if you have a 258-foot fence", he wrote. "Why should we be blamed all the time? What makes a cheesy home run a Chinese home run?"

After Brannick posted it on the wall of the team's press room, Lee's petition earned him congratulatory letters from Chinese Americans all over the country, and became national news, earning time on the television series What's the Story. Jack Orr, a Sporting News writer, went to Lee's restaurant and told him he was right to object. "Writers shouldn't be using that term", he said. "But what took you so long to get around to protesting?" Two years later, another New York sportswriter, Jimmy Cannon, noted when defining "Chinese home run" in a glossary of baseball terms he wrote for Baseball Digest that it "would probably be called something else if the Chinese had more influence".

The Giants moved from the Polo Grounds to San Francisco at the end of the 1957 season. Chinese home runs were once again a subject of discussion, with many writers recalling short shots like Thomson's and Rhodes' as a quirk of the former stadium now lost to baseball. Writing in The New York Times as spring training was underway, Gay Talese wrote that Giants' players in their new home missed the "cheap (or Chinese) home runs ... legal nonetheless".

=== 1958–1961: Los Angeles Coliseum ===
Another park quickly took over the Polo Grounds' reputation for Chinese home runs. New York City's other National League team, the Brooklyn Dodgers, had also moved to the West Coast for the 1958 season, where they played their first home games in the Los Angeles Memorial Coliseum. Built for the 1932 Olympics, it had mainly been used for football since then. Its field was well-suited for that sport and the track and field events it had been designed for, but putting a baseball diamond in it was awkward. The left-field fence was only 251 feet (77 m) from the plate, even shorter than right had been at the Polo Grounds. As often as the Polo Grounds had seen short home runs to right, the Coliseum could have potentially seen even more short homers to left due to the majority of batters being right-handed.

Before the regular season even began, players from other teams were complaining about it. Giants' pitcher Johnny Antonelli called it a "farce". Warren Spahn, ace for the defending World Series champion Milwaukee Braves, suggested that a rule be established requiring that all fences be at least 300 feet (91 m) from the plate. Owner Walter O'Malley ordered that a 40-foot (12 m) wire mesh screen be put up behind the left field fence. "We don't want to acquire a reputation for Chinese home runs", he said. Sports media, particularly back in New York, charged that O'Malley was destroying the game for the sake of ticket sales. Sports Illustrated titled a critical editorial "Every Sixth Hit a Homer!", expressing concern that Babe Ruth's record of 60 home runs during a season might easily fall to a less worthy hitter in the coming season due to the Dodgers' short fence. An Associated Press (AP) poll of baseball writers found that a majority believed that any home run records set mainly in the Coliseum should carry an asterisk.

As had happened with Rhodes' home run four years earlier, the Chinese-themed joking around the short fence continued. The screen was called the "Chinese screen" or the "Great Wall of China", and the Coliseum as a whole became known as "O'Malley's Chinese Theatre", "The House that Charlie Chan Built", or even, in one Willard Mullin cartoon, "Flung Wong O'Malley's Little Joss House in Los Angeles". The Sporting News, contrary to the preseason trend, editorialized that it could not yet be said that the short wall would adversely affect the game. But on the cover of that issue (which also included Spink's etymological investigation) it put a cartoon showing an outsized Chinese coolie hanging over the Coliseum's back fence. (Note: The cover design, with its suggestions of the Yellow Peril, may also have reflected another change in American perceptions of the Chinese. Nine years earlier, the Communists had won China's civil war and established the People's Republic of China, ostensibly allied with the Soviet Union against the U.S. in the Cold War. At that time, with China undergoing its Great Leap Forward, an attempt to rapidly industrialize the country, Americans were particularly fearful of what Chinese workers might be able to accomplish.) The Chinese American community in the Los Angeles area made its objections known.

At first the worst fears of the media appeared justified. In the first week of play at the Coliseum, 24 home runs were hit, most of them over the left field fence and screen. Chicago Cubs outfielder Lee Walls, not especially distinguished as a hitter, was responsible for three of them—in a single game. Baseball Commissioner Ford C. Frick, who had defended the Coliseum's dimensions during the preseason, quickly proposed that a second, 60-foot (18 m) mesh screen be established in the stands at 333 feet (101 m) from the plate, with any balls that fell between the two a ground rule double; however, that turned to be impossible under earthquake-safety provisions of the Los Angeles building code.

Pitchers soon adjusted. They threw outside to right-handed hitters, requiring them to pull hard for the left-field fence, and as at the Polo Grounds, a deep fence in right center (444 feet (135 m)) challenged lefties, and over the course of the season the home run count at the Coliseum declined to the same level as other National League parks. At the end of the season, The Sporting News noted, there had been only 21 more home runs in the Coliseum than there were in the smaller Ebbets Field, where the Dodgers had played in Brooklyn. During the off-season, Frick announced a rule change stipulating that any new stadium built for major-league play must have all its fences at least 325 feet (99 m) from home plate, as Spahn had suggested. This was widely viewed as a response to the preseason controversy.

The only hitter to truly benefit from the short left-field fence was Wally Moon, a left-handed outfielder who began playing for the Dodgers the next season. He figured out how to lift balls high enough so that they dropped down, almost vertically, just beyond the screen. This brought him 37 of his 49 homers during the three seasons that he played in the Coliseum. He was not accused of exploiting the short distance to the fence for Chinese home runs. Instead, he was celebrated for his inventiveness; similar home runs have since been called "Moon shots" in his honor.

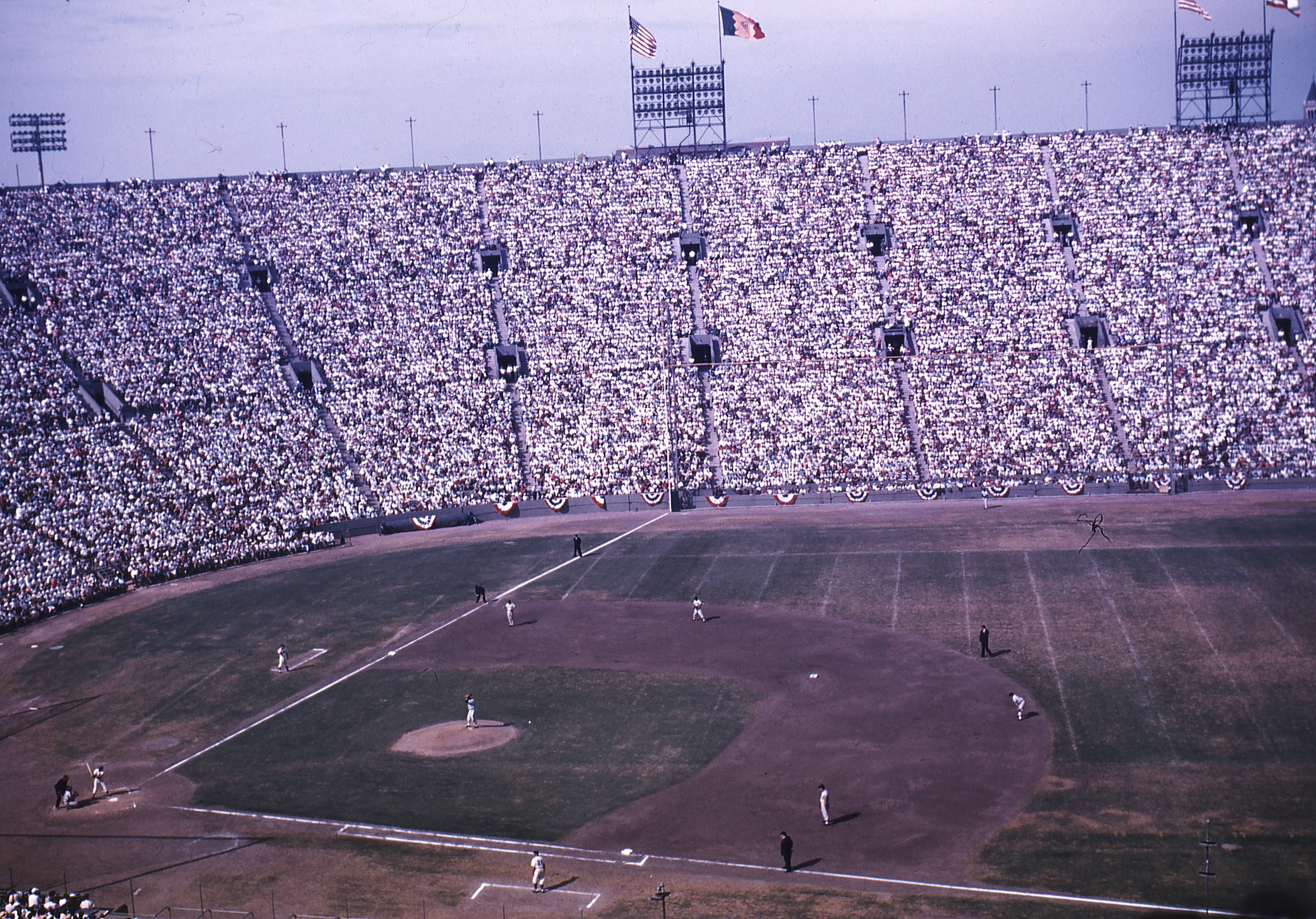
Short left field line in Los Angeles Coliseum, seen here during the 1959 World Series

Game 5 of that year's World Series, ultimately won by the Dodgers over the Chicago White Sox, would be the last postseason Major League Baseball game played at the Coliseum. After two more seasons at the Coliseum, the Dodgers moved to Dodger Stadium in 1962, where they have played home games since. After the then–Los Angeles Angels' first American League season in 1961, the club asked for a new home in the Los Angeles area, initially asking if they could play in the Coliseum. Frick refused.

In 2008, to celebrate their 50th anniversary in Los Angeles, the Dodgers played a preseason exhibition game at the Coliseum against the Boston Red Sox, losing by a score of 7–1. The wire mesh screen was restored, this time at the 60-foot (18 m) height Frick had sought because an additional section of seats had been added there since 1959, shortening left field to 201 feet (61 m). A Dodgers executive noted that it mimicked the Green Monster in left field at Fenway Park, the Red Sox' home field.

=== 1962–1963: Return of the Polo Grounds ===
In 1962, baseball returned to the Polo Grounds when the National League created the New York Mets as an expansion team, to replace the Giants and Dodgers. The new team used the old stadium for two seasons while Shea Stadium was built out in the Queens neighborhood of Flushing. The Mets lost the franchise's first six games at the Giants' former home, on their way to a 40–120 record, the second most losses in a major-league season, but in those games they and their opponents hit ten home runs apiece. Sportswriters took notice, and one AP writer picked up where Dick Young had left off eight years before: "So solly, honorable sir. Chinese home run not buried in Coliseum. Making big comeback in honorable ancient Polo Grounds".

While the team's poor play and last-place finishes in its two seasons in the Polo Grounds left few individual home runs over the right-field fence to become the subject of popular comment and mockery as Rhodes' had, the term was still in use during the team's radio broadcasts, as Yale professor Dana Brand recalled in his 2007 memoir, Mets Fan:

If you hit a 300-foot home run in the Polo Grounds, Lindsey Nelson or Ralph Kiner or Bob Murphy would call it a Chinese home run. Obviously, they wouldn't call it a Chinese home run now, even if you could still hit a 300-foot home run. To this day, I don't know what made a home run like this Chinese. Was it because it was short, something a small person could hit? Was there some implication that it was tricky or cheap or sneaky? What a strange world that was.

Problems in completing Shea Stadium forced the Mets to stay one season more. At one point during the season, manager Casey Stengel alluded to the short home runs when berating pitcher Tracy Stallard. "At the end of this season they're gonna tear this place down", he reminded Stallard as he took him out of a game in which he had given up several home runs. "The way you're pitching, that right field section is gone already". In April 1964, the Polo Grounds were demolished and replaced with a public housing project.

=== 1965–present: Disuse ===
Use of the term largely faded out afterwards, and it was seen as offensive. In 1981 San Francisco Chronicle columnist Herb Caen criticized Oakland A's radio announcer Bill King for saying a Bobby Murcer shot was "not a Chinese home run". Caen called the remark "racist" and wrote: "I'm sure he has heard from militant Oriental groups, all of which hit hard".

That sentiment was revived in 2015 when Kansas City Royals announcers Ryan Lefebvre and Rex Hudler used it in reference to a long foul ball. After a fan in the outfield stands made a considerable effort to retrieve one such ball hit into the stands by Indians catcher Brett Hayes, the two briefly recalled that a "Monty" (speculated to be Jeff Montgomery, co-host of the team's pregame show), had referred to it as a "Chinese home run" the previous night (although not on the air). Stephen Douglas of The Big Lead criticized them for this, recalling the term's past and said it was "time for Royals broadcasters to retire the term from their vocabulary permanently. Both on the air and in private", an admonition echoed by ThePostGame.

== Secondary definition ==
Dickson found another usage, referring to a high foul ball that travels a great distance, usually behind home plate. In Stephen King's 1980 short story "The Monkey", anthologized five years later in Skeleton Crew, the protagonists' father recalls days watching sandlot games during his own childhood, when he "was too small to play, but he sat far out in foul territory sucking his blueberry Popsicle and chasing what the big kids called 'Chinese home runs'". Dickson wrote to King, who told him two years later that he had first heard the term when learning to play baseball in his own childhood, during a time when he lived, briefly, in Stratford, Connecticut. After he returned to his native Maine in 1958, the same year the Giants and Dodgers moved west, he recalled hearing it again. "In both cases", he told Dickson, "a Chinese home run was a foul ball, usually over the backstop". Dickson concluded from his correspondence that that use may well be limited to New England. (Note: A writer for Boog City, a journal based in New York's East Village, recalled in 2002 that the term was in common use during his Boston childhood, distinguishing it from the primary usage, which he associated with New Yorkers. A 1980 article in The Midwestern Journal of Language and Folklore also identifies "Chinese home run" as regionally specific to New England when used to describe a foul ball hit high and backward.)

According to Dickson, one of the etymologies submitted to Joe Falls' Sporting News column, by a St. Louis man named Tom Becket, may explain this usage. "In this version, the term harks back to the turn of the 20th century and a game played in Salem, Massachusetts, between teams of Irish and Polish immigrants". The game was close, and went deep into extra innings. By the 17th inning, only one ball was left. A shortstop named Chaney, playing for the Irish team, fouled the ball deep into unmowed grass and weeds behind the backstop. After searching through it for 20 minutes, the umpire gave up and declared that the Polish team had forfeited the game since it had failed to provide enough balls. "So the cheer went up, 'Chaney's home run won the game!'", Becket explained. "Various misunderstandings as to dialects eventually brought it around to the now-familiar 'Chinese home run'".

Unlike the primary meaning, this usage has persisted into the 21st century. In discussing the etymology of the French Canadian dish known as Chinese pie, poet Paul Marion, a native of Lowell, Massachusetts, suggests it "may be a crass old joke like a Chinese home run over the backstop". Five years later, Phil Solomon, a writer for the Patch local news website covering Port Jefferson, New York, discusses both meanings in condemning the use of "Chinese auction". "The term is rarely used these days. It is not politically correct. It was used to describe a foul ball that went over the backstop", he writes, observing also that "you old baseball fans will remember the Chinese home runs in the Polo Grounds".

== See also ==
- Baseball in China
- Chinese fire drill, another derogatory term from the early 20th century that has survived that era
- Glossary of baseball terms
- Left-arm unorthodox spin, a cricket bowling technique sometimes referred to as a Chinaman, supposedly after an early player to use it
