= Dick Young (sportswriter) =

American sportswriter

- Born: October 17, 1917; Manhattan, New York, U.S.
- Died: August 30, 1987 (aged 69); The Bronx, New York, U.S.
- Occupation: Sportswriter
- Employer(s): New York Daily News, New York Post
- Known for: Baseball coverage
- Awards: J. G. Taylor Spink Award (1978)

Richard Leonard Young (October 17, 1917 – August 30, 1987) was an American sportswriter best known for his direct and abrasive style, and his 45-year association with the New York Daily News. He was elected to the writers' wing of the Baseball Hall of Fame in 1978, and was a former president of the Baseball Writers' Association of America.

== Writing career ==
Young joined the News as a teenaged messenger boy in 1937, and broke into the sports pages five years later. He eventually became the newspaper's signature columnist, known to readers for his insider coverage and acerbic wit. During the 1949 season, after the Brooklyn Dodgers blew a game in the bottom of the ninth inning to the Braves in Boston, Young's account of the game began, "The tree that grows in Brooklyn is an apple tree. It grows apples, large ones in the throats of Brooklyn ballplayers—ballplayers like the pitchers who choked up here today to blow a beaut...." This remark referred to the colloquialism "taking the apple", which was then used to describe an athlete choking. Previously, Young had agitated for the dismissal of Dodgers manager Burt Shotton, or "KOBS" in Youngspeak. Daily News readers knew that "KOBS" was Young's acronym for "Kindly Old Burt Shotton", and was not intended as a term of endearment.

Referring to the 30,000 attendance figure announced by New York Titans owner Harry Wismer, Young quipped, "He must have been counting the eyes." Describing a lopsided loss by the Brooklyn Dodgers, Young began his column, "This story belongs on page three with the other axe murders."

What would become Young's most famous sentence as a sportswriter did not appear under his own byline. While covering journeyman Don Larsen's perfect game in the 1956 World Series, Daily News writer Joe Trimble struggled to find appropriate words to begin his article. Young reached over and typed seven words into Trimble's typewriter: "The imperfect man pitched a perfect game."

A 1957 column by Young revealed to fans that Dodger teammates Jackie Robinson and Don Newcombe were no longer on the best of terms. The article contained several negative quotes from Roy Campanella ("When it's my turn to bow out of baseball, I certainly don't want to go out like he did", and "Instead of being grateful to baseball, he's criticizing it. Everything he has he owes to baseball"), which were obtained during a conversation in Campanella's liquor store that Campanella had mistakenly assumed was off the record.

In 1959 and 1960, Young was a vigorous advocate of the Continental League, the proposed third major professional baseball league that was announced in the wake of the Dodgers and Giants leaving New York for California. The Continental League never came to fruition, but was instrumental in spurring Major League Baseball to add four new expansion franchises. This included a replacement National League team in New York: the Mets.

In 1961, it was Young who first suggested the idea of putting an asterisk on Roger Maris' home run total, should the Yankee right fielder fail to catch or surpass Babe Ruth in the first 154 games of the season, saying "Everyone does that when there's a difference of opinion."

Willie Mays was elected to the Hall of Fame in 1979 with 94% of the vote. Young angrily denounced the 23 sportswriters who had omitted Mays from their ballots, writing, "If Jesus Christ were to show up with His old baseball glove, some guys wouldn't vote for Him. He dropped the cross three times, didn't He?"

Young was a tireless worker, writing as many as seven of his "Young Ideas" columns per week, in addition to covering one of the New York baseball teams six out of seven days, for up to three daily editions of the News. He also had a regular column in The Sporting News from the late 1950s until 1985. At his peak, he was probably the highest-paid sportswriter in the United States. The Sporting News described his career arc: "Though Young's best work was on the baseball beat, his most controversial and memorable writing came later, as a general columnist. He became the Archie Bunker of the keyboard, voicing populist rage."

A resident of Woodcliff Lake, New Jersey, Young underwent intestinal surgery in June 1987; he died in late August at Montefiore Hospital in The Bronx. He was survived by his wife and eight children. For several years after his death, The Village Voice ran a parody of a late-period Young column in its sports section, railing at all comers underneath the tag "Dateline: Hell".

== Abrasive style and personality ==
Young was also known for his conservative views and his mercurial temperament. He physically brawled with technicians who he felt crowded the clubhouse, when the age of television arrived. Fellow sportswriter Marty Appel recalled "cringing" at Young's "boorish" habit of upbraiding workers in other cities' stadiums for not meeting his "New York standards". Appel continued:

But you had to love Young. He was the best in his field, including the best at getting his way. The Commissioner's Office put up a rope barricade to keep the press 20 feet from the batting cage during the World Series? There was Young, undoing it. TV cameras suddenly appeared at press conferences? There was Young standing in front of the lens.

Though he was an advocate of certain rights and causes, he was skeptical of others. Despite his own candid clubhouse reporting, Young blasted Jim Bouton as a "social leper" after the publication of the pitcher's tell-all book Ball Four. The head of the players' union, Marvin Miller, was negatively characterized as a "Svengali". And when an arbitrator ruled in favor of the union, re-interpreting baseball's reserve clause in favor of the players, Young's first reaction was to write: "Peter Seitz reminds me of a terrorist, a little man to whom nothing very important has happened in his lifetime, who suddenly decides to create some excitement by tossing a bomb into things."

Young took to invoking "My America", which was more a state of mind than a location. From Young's America, the writer decried the majority of contemporary athletes and events. Certain athletes won Young over with their soft-spokenness or work ethic, like boxers Joe Frazier and Ken Norton. He had no tolerance for the brash new style of sports stars such as Muhammad Ali or Joe Namath, who became his targets. But Young's deference to authority could lead him to oppose modest athletes also, as in 1974 when he took commissioner Bowie Kuhn's side over Hank Aaron's. Sitting on 713 home runs, Aaron wanted to tie and break Babe Ruth's all-time record at home, but Kuhn decreed that Aaron would have to play a set number of road games before getting that chance. Young wrote that the Atlanta Braves were destroying the integrity of the sport by holding Aaron out of the lineup.

Having no interest in the "foreign" game of soccer, Young heckled Pelé and the owners of the New York Cosmos at the press conference announcing the star's arrival in the NASL. Reportedly, Young subsequently brought Pelé to a Mets game and was shocked to see him besieged by fans. While covering the 1980 World Series, he wrote admiringly of the way the Philadelphia police had ringed the field with mounted officers, adding "If a few dogs on leashes and a few policemen on horses can command respect, think of what an electric chair might do."

In 1986, boxer Larry Holmes had Young ejected from one of his workouts. In 1987, he urged fans to boo Dwight Gooden following his suspension for cocaine use. According to Marty Appel, "he wrote a note about why Johnny Bench's first marriage ended that made even Young's best defenders wonder if he had gone too far."

He could be prickly with his colleagues. He was dismissive of The New York Times' star columnist Red Smith, whom he considered sentimental and old-fashioned. Never comfortable with the broadcast media, Young had a long and loud mutual hostility with Howard Cosell, whom he called "Howie the Shill" in his columns when he was not using pejoratives like "fraud" or "an ass". Cosell described Young as "a right wing cultural illiterate". On some occasions, Young would stand near Cosell while he was taping locker room interviews, and shout out profanities so that the tape would not be usable. In 1967, Young told Sports Illustrated, "You've got to treat Howard the way he treats you. You've got to throw his flamboyant junk back in his face."

However, Young was also an early advocate of allowing female sportswriters to have full access in locker rooms, and many new writers had stories to tell about how Young had generously helped and advised them.

Young was an outspoken opponent of baseball's segregation policy, and wrote about the racial abuse faced by such players as Jackie Robinson and Don Newcombe. But he also continued to call Muhammad Ali "Cassius Clay" for many years after his conversion, and accused the boxer of racism and draft-dodging. Young did not reconcile with Ali until after the latter was retired.

=== "Chinese home run" lede ===
Giants outfielder Dusty Rhodes, pinch hitting for Monte Irvin, hit a three-run walk-off homer that won Game 1 of the 1954 World Series over the heavily favored Cleveland Indians in the 10th inning. Because the homer had barely cleared the 259-foot (79 m) right-field fence in the Polo Grounds, the shortest in baseball at that time, it was called a "Chinese home run", implying that it hadn't required much effort to hit. Many New York sportswriters riffed on this idea in the coverage. Young began his piece:

The story of the Giants' 5–2 win over Cleveland in yesterday's World Series opener should be written vertically, from top to bottom ... in Chinese hieroglyphics. It was won on a 10th inning homer that was not only sudden death but pure murder ... right out of a Charlie Chan yarn. Ming Toy Rhodes, sometimes called Dusty by his Occidental friends, was honorable person who, as a pinch hitter, delivered miserable bundle of wet wash to first row in rightfield of Polo Grounds, some 259 1/2 feet down the road from the laundry.

In reaction to Young's use of so many Chinese stereotypes, Shavey Lee, a Chinatown restaurateur considered the unofficial "mayor" of the Chinese American population in the city, collected signatures from his community on a Chinese-language petition to the Giants' secretary, demanding that all sportswriters stop using the term. "It isn't the fault of the Chinese if you have a 258-foot fence", he wrote. "Why should we be blamed all the time? What makes a cheesy home run a Chinese home run?"

=== Tom Seaver feud ===
Most notoriously, Young engaged in a public feud with New York Mets pitcher Tom Seaver, which contributed to one of the turning points in Mets history. After free agency came to baseball, Seaver publicly complained that Mets owner M. Donald Grant made no effort to sign any of the available players. Seaver was also renegotiating his own contract, and Grant portrayed his star pitcher as being motivated by money. Grant's most enthusiastic supporter in the press was Young, who wrote a series of blistering columns about Seaver, culminating on June 15, 1977. "In a way", Young wrote, "Tom Seaver is like Walter O'Malley. Both are very good at what they do. Both are very deceptive in what they say. Both are very greedy."

But it was a paragraph later in the piece that enraged Seaver:

Nolan Ryan is getting more [salary] now than Seaver, and that galls Tom because Nancy Seaver and Ruth Ryan are very friendly and Tom Seaver long has treated Nolan Ryan like a little brother.

Seaver and the Mets had just agreed on a contract extension the previous night, but following the column, Seaver informed the Mets that the deal was off and that he was insistent on being traded out of New York.

"That Young column was the straw that broke the back", Seaver said in 2007. "Bringing your family into it, with no truth whatsoever to what he wrote. I could not abide that. I had to go." Seaver was traded to the Cincinnati Reds later the same day. Selected as a recipient of the J. G. Taylor Spink Award by the Baseball Writers' Association of America (BBWAA) in late 1978, when Young received the award in August 1979 at the Baseball Hall of Fame in Cooperstown, New York, he was heavily booed by the fans.

In 1981, four years after vilifying Seaver for renegotiating his existing contract with the Mets, Young broke his own contract with the Daily News and jumped to the crosstown Post, where he remained until his death six years later. The News filed a breach of contract suit against Young, which was eventually dismissed.

=== Eddie Murray column ===
Seaver was not the only baseball star to react angrily and conspicuously to Young's style of writing. During the 1979 World Series, Young interviewed Ray Poitevint, the Baltimore Orioles scout who had signed Eddie Murray six years earlier, and wrote about his protracted negotiations with Murray's family:

He [Poitevint] offers $20,000. He gets cursed at. He leaves. He goes back. He is called a thief, kicked out. This was by Ed Murray's older brothers. They and Ed Murray's mother do all the talking. Ed Murray, 17, just sits there, listening, not saying a word. In the space of five weeks, Ray Poitevint pays 16 visits to the Murray household, and goes away empty.

The column further claimed that one of Murray's brothers tried to hit Poitevint with his car, and that one of Poitevint's associates was called an "Uncle Tom" (in fact, the associate was white).

In the wake of the column, Murray adopted a general policy of not speaking to any sportswriters, a career-long stance which provoked a considerable amount of criticism from the sports media. Similar stances were taken by George Hendrick and Steve Carlton.

=== Owners ===
A self-professed Republican, Young sided frequently with owners of professional sports teams engaging in public contractual debates with players, most notoriously in 1977 when he described Mets ace pitcher Tom Seaver, a three-time Cy Young Award winner, as "a pouting, griping, morale-breaking clubhouse lawyer."

== Legacy ==
Young was the first sportswriter to treat the clubhouse as a central and necessary part of the sports "beat", and his success at ferreting out scoops and insights from within the previously private sanctum of the team was influential and often imitated. The Boston Globe's Bob Ryan said of Young, "He's the guy that broke ground, the guy who went into the locker room, and that changed everything."

In 2000, Ira Berkow chose Young as one of the seven sportswriters who'd made the greatest impact on their profession, along with Red Smith, Grantland Rice, Ring Lardner, Damon Runyon, Jimmy Cannon, and Jim Murray. According to Jack Ziegler in the Dictionary of Literary Biography, Young was a "key transitional figure" between the "gentlemanly" sports reporting of old-time writers like Grantland Rice and Arthur Daley.

Upon his death, The New York Times described Young's prose style: "With all the subtlety of a knee in the groin, Dick Young made people gasp... He could be vicious, ignorant, trivial and callous, but for many years he was the epitome of the brash, unyielding yet sentimental Damon Runyon sportswriter." Esquire called Young's writing "coarse and simpleminded, like a cave painting. But it is superbly crafted." Ross Wetzsteon wrote that Young had "singlehandedly replaced the pompous poetry of the press box with the cynical poetry of the streets." In his book The Boys of Summer, Roger Kahn called Young "spiky, self-educated, and New York." Characteristically, Young described his approach to sportswriting simply: "Tell people what's going on, and what you think is going on. Bread-and-butter stuff, meat-and-potato stuff."
