= Los Angeles Memorial Coliseum =

Stadium in Los Angeles, California

- The Coliseum; L.A. Coliseum; The Grand Old Lady
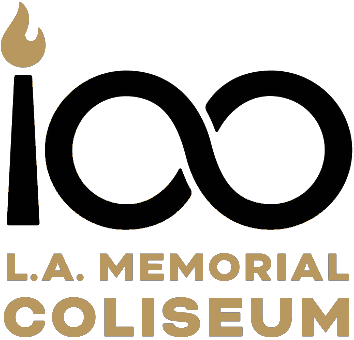
- Logo since 2022, first used for the stadium's 100th anniversary (2023).

- The stadium in 2025

- Location in the Greater Los Angeles area Location in California Location in the United States Location in North America
- Interactive map of Los Angeles Memorial Coliseum
- Address: 3911 South Figueroa Street
- Location: Los Angeles, California, U.S.
- Coordinates: 34°0′51″N 118°17′16″W
- Owner: State of California; Los Angeles County; City of Los Angeles
- Operator: University of Southern California
- Capacity: 77,500; 93,607 (pre–2018)
- Executive suites: 42
- Surface: Bermuda grass
- Public transit: Expo Park/USC; Expo/Vermont

Construction
- Groundbreaking: December 21, 1921; 104 years ago
- Opened: May 1, 1923; 103 years ago
- Renovated: 1930, 1964, 1977–78, 1983, 1993, 1995, 2011, 2017–2019
- Cost: US$954,872.98 (original)($18 million in 2025 dollars) $954,869 (renovations in 2010) ($1.41 million in 2025 dollars) $315 million (renovations in 2018)
- Architects: John and Donald Parkinson (original); DLR Group (renovations)
- General contractors: Edwards, Widley & Dixon Company (original); Hunt & Hathaway Dinwiddie Construction Company (renovations)

Tenant
- USC Trojans football (NCAA) (1923–present); Former List: Los Angeles Rams (NFL) (1946–1979, 2016–2019); Los Angeles Christmas Festival (NCAA) (1924); UCLA Bruins football (NCAA) (1928–1981); Los Angeles Dons (AAFC) (1946–1949); Los Angeles Dodgers (MLB) (1958–1961); Los Angeles Chargers (AFL) (1960); Los Angeles Wolves (USA) (1967); Los Angeles Toros (NPSL) (1967); Los Angeles Aztecs (NASL) (1977, 1981); Los Angeles Raiders (NFL) (1982–1994); Los Angeles Express (USFL) (1983–1985); Los Angeles Dragons (SFL) (2000); Los Angeles Xtreme (XFL) (2001); Los Angeles Temptation (LFL) (2009–2011, 2015); LA Giltinis (MLR) (2021–2022)

Website
- lacoliseum.com
- Los Angeles Memorial Coliseum
- U.S. National Register of Historic Places
- U.S. National Historic Landmark
- California Historical Landmark
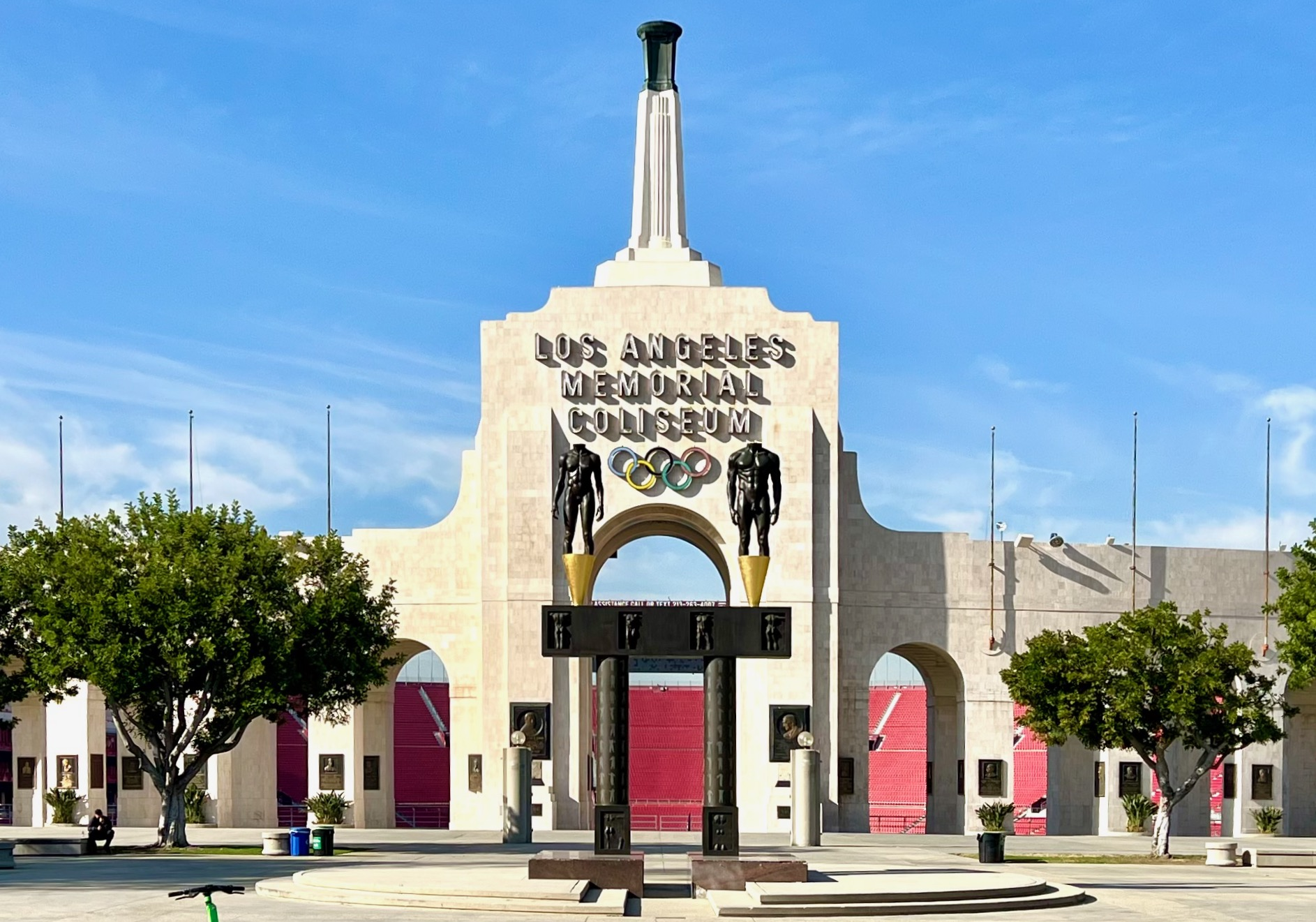
- The Peristyle plaza entrance to the Coliseum, including the two bronze Olympic statues, December 2022
- Area: 29.2 acres (11.8 ha)
- Architectural style: Art Moderne
- NRHP reference No.: 84003866
- CHISL No.: 960

Significant dates
- Added to NRHP: July 27, 1984; 42 years ago
- Designated NHL: July 27, 1984; 42 years ago

The Los Angeles Memorial Coliseum (also known as the Los Angeles Coliseum or L.A. Coliseum) is a multi-purpose stadium in the Exposition Park neighborhood of Los Angeles, California, United States. The Coliseum was commissioned in 1921 and completed in 1923 as a memorial to Los Angeles veterans of World War I. The stadium currently serves as the home of the University of Southern California Trojans football team, and is located directly adjacent to the school's main University Park campus. For most of its history the Coliseum was among the largest stadiums in the United States, seating over 100,000 for several decades.

The Coliseum was the home of the Los Angeles Rams of the National Football League (NFL) from 1946 to 1979 and again from 2016 to 2019. It was the site of the first AFL–NFL World Championship Game (later called Super Bowl I) and Super Bowl VII. The stadium has also been the temporary home of the Los Angeles Dodgers of Major League Baseball (MLB) from 1958 to 1961, and was the host venue for games three, four, and five of the 1959 World Series. Additionally, it has served as a home field for a number of other teams, including the 1960 inaugural season for the Los Angeles Chargers, the Los Angeles Raiders of the NFL from 1982 to 1994, and UCLA Bruins football.

The Coliseum is jointly owned by the State of California's Sixth District Agricultural Association, Los Angeles County, and the City of Los Angeles. It is managed and operated by the University of Southern California (USC).

The Coliseum was designated a National Historic Landmark on July 27, 1984, a day before the opening ceremony of the 1984 Summer Olympics. It will become the first stadium to have hosted the Summer Olympics three times when it hosts the 2028 Summer Olympics, previously hosting in 1932 and 1984.

== Facility ==
=== Planning and construction ===
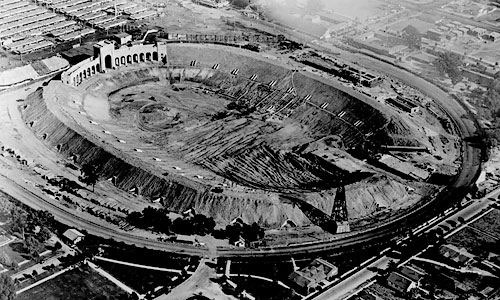
The Coliseum under construction in 1922

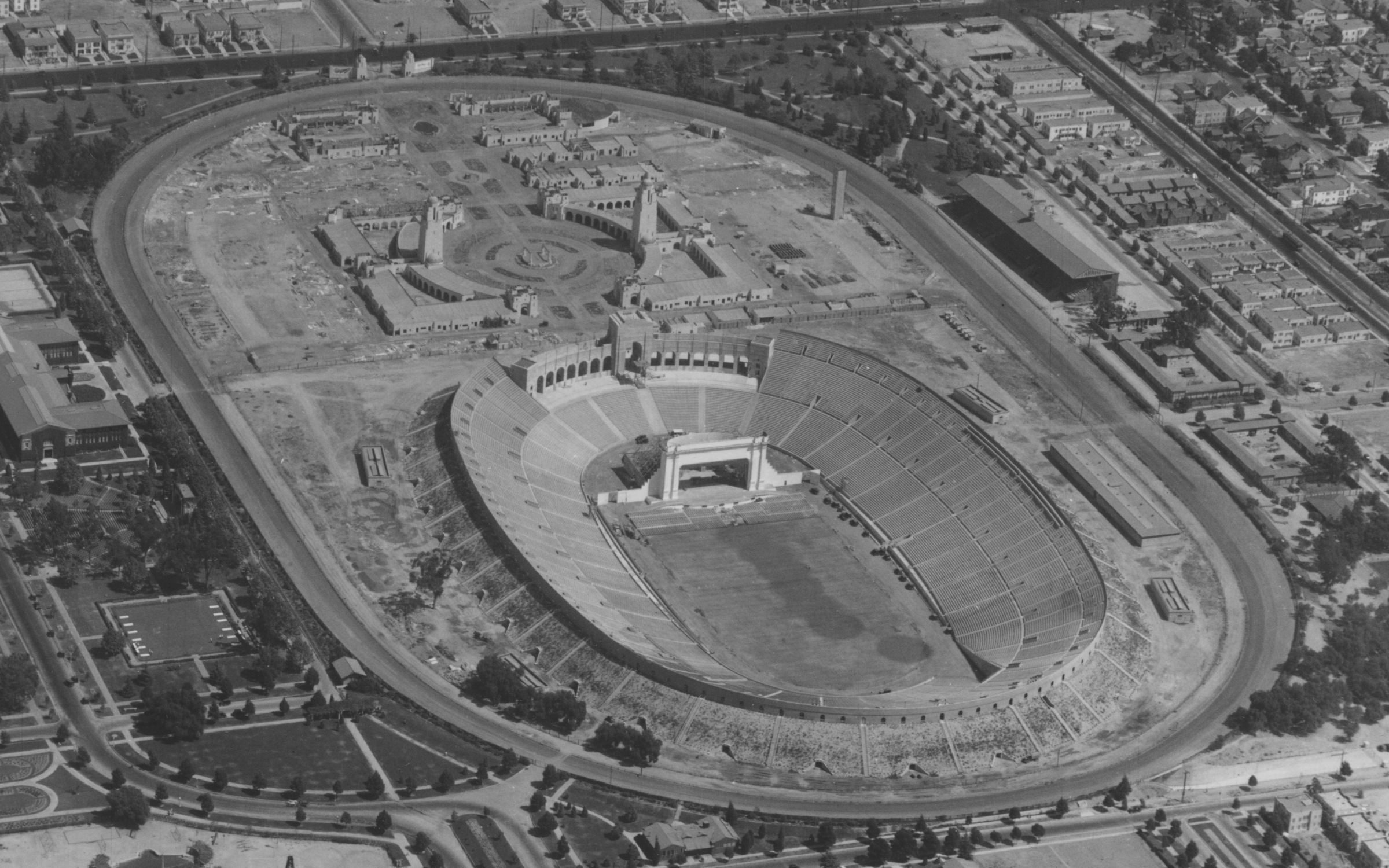
The Coliseum in 1923

Before the stadium was built, Exposition Park was the staging ground of various agricultural expositions and was operated by the Sixth District Agricultural Association. William Miller Bowen, head of the association, announced plans in January 1919 to build a football field for the University of Southern California in the park. Separately, the executive board of the Community Development Association determined in November 1919 that Los Angeles needed a municipal stadium capable of seating about 75,000. William May Garland, the CDA's president, advocated for the stadium to be built as a potential host of the 1924 Summer Olympics. A municipal bond issue was placed on the ballot on August 31, 1920; it required a two-thirds majority to pass and was narrowly defeated. Instead, in November 1921, the CDA leased part of Exposition Park from the city, built the stadium itself, and rented the venue back to the city and Los Angeles County until its debts were paid.

The Coliseum was commissioned as a memorial to L.A. veterans of World War I, and rededicated in 1968 to all United States veterans of the war. The groundbreaking ceremony took place on December 21, 1921, with construction being completed in just over 16 months, on May 1, 1923. Designed by John and Donald Parkinson, the original bowl's initial construction costs were $954,873. The Coliseum opened in 1923 with a capacity of 75,144, the largest stadium in Los Angeles at the time. The field runs east to west with the press box on the south side of the stadium.

=== Later additions ===
Ahead of the 1932 Olympics the stadium was extended upward to 79 rows of seats with two tiers of tunnels, expanding the seating capacity to 101,574. The signature Olympic cauldron was added and the Coliseum was briefly known as Olympic Stadium. The cauldron and the Olympic rings remain above the peristyle at the east end of the stadium.

In 1937, one of the first all-electric scoreboards in the nation was installed over the peristyle's center arch, later replaced in 1972. This was replaced in 1983 with a scoreboard and video screen that towered over the peristyle to one side of the arch. In August 2011, construction began on the Coliseum's west end on a new 6,000-square-foot (560 m^{2}) HD video scoreboard, accompanying the existing video scoreboard on the peristyle (east end) of the stadium. The video scoreboard officially went into operation on September 3, 2011, at USC football's home opener versus the University of Minnesota. The current jumbotrons to each side of the peristyle were installed in 2017.

Over the years new light towers have been placed along the north and south rims. The large analog clock and thermometer over the office windows at either end of the peristyle were installed in 1955. In the mid- and late 1950s, the press box was renovated, and the "Los Angeles Memorial Coliseum" lettering and Olympic rings, lighted at night, were added to the eastern face of the peristyle tower.

=== Renovations ===
==== 1960s through 1980s ====
In 1964, the stadium underwent its first major renovation in over three decades. Most of the original pale green wood-and-metal bench seating was replaced by individual theater-type chairs of dark red, beige and yellow; these seats remained until 2018, although the yellow color was eliminated in the 1970s. The seating capacity was reduced to approximately 93,000.

From 1964 to the late 1970s, it was common practice to shift the playing field to the closed end of the stadium and install end zone bleachers in front of the peristyle, limiting further the number of seats available for sale. For USC–UCLA and USC–Notre Dame games, which often attracted crowds upward of 90,000, the bleachers were moved eastward and the field was re-marked in its original position. When a larger east grandstand was installed between 1977 and 1978, at the behest of Rams owner Carroll Rosenbloom, the capacity was just 71,500.

With the upcoming 1984 Summer Olympic Games, and under the direction of H. D. Thoreau Jr., a new track was installed and the playing field permanently placed inside it. A depiction of the Olympic rings and a 25-step hydraulic staircase were added on the central staircase and arch of the peristyle to allow the cauldron to be lit by lifting up the stairs to the burnable Olympic Rings, which brought the flame to the cauldron on top.

==== 1993 ====
The combination of the stadium's large, relatively shallow design, along with the presence of the track between the playing field and the stands, meant that some of the original end zone seats were as far from the field by the equivalent length of another football field. The Coliseum underwent a $15 million renovation before the 1993 football season, which lowered the field by 11 feet (3.4 m) and replacing the running track with 14 new rows of seats, bringing the first row of seats closer to the playing field (a maximum distance of 54 feet (16.5 m) at the eastern 30-yard-line). A portable seating section was built between the eastern endline and the peristyle bleachers (removable for concerts and similar events). The remaining bleachers were replaced with individual seating.

This was anticipated to be the first of a multi-stage renovation designed by HNTB that would have turned the Coliseum into a split-bowl stadium with two levels of mezzanine suites. However, after the 1994 Northridge earthquake, the $93 million was required from government agencies (including the Federal Emergency Management Agency) to repair earthquake damage, and the renovations demanded by the Raiders were put on hold indefinitely. In 2000, Bentley Management Group (BMG) was hired as the project manager to complete work at the Coliseum and Sports Arena funded by FEMA, including the Coliseum's new press box elevator, various concession stands, restroom improvements, and concrete spalling repairs.

==== 2018–2019 ====
Additional seating increased the Coliseum's seating capacity to 93,607 in September 2008. After assuming the Coliseum master lease in 2013, USC unveiled an estimated $270 million project for a massive renovation and restoration the Coliseum in October 2015. The plans were met with mixed reactions from the public, and the Los Angeles Olympic bid committee contemplated additional renovations to support its bid. Construction began in January 2018 and was completed in time for the 2019 football season, using only university funds. The project budget increased from the initial estimate of $270 million to $315 million mainly due to the tight construction schedule.

The upgrades included replacing every seat in the stadium, adding new aisles and widening some seats; construction of a larger and modern press box with new box suites, premium lounges, a viewing deck, a V.I.P. section, and the introduction of LED ribbon boards; restoration and renaming of the peristyle to the Julia and George Argyros Plaza; and adding a new sound system, stadium wide Wi-Fi, two new HD video jumbotrons, new concession stands, upgraded entry concourses, new interior and exterior lighting, modernization of plumbing and electrical systems. Capacity was reduced by about 16,000 seats. The current official capacity of the Coliseum is 77,500, with 42 suites, 1,100 club seats, 24 loge boxes, and a 500-person rooftop terrace.

=== Seating capacity (college football) ===
| Years | Capacity |
|---|---|
| 1930 | 75,144 |
| 1934 | 101,574 |
| 1939 | 105,000 |
| 1946 | 103,000 |
| 1947–1964 | 101,671 |
| 1965–1966 | 97,500 |
| 1967–1975 | 94,500 |
| 1976–1982 | 92,604 |
| 1983–1995 | 92,516 |
| 1996–2007 | 92,000 |
| 2008–2017 | 93,607 |
| 2018 | 78,500 |
| 2019–present | 77,500 |

== Operation ==
The Los Angeles Memorial Coliseum Commission provides public oversight of the master lease agreement with USC. The Commission consists of six voting members appointed by the three ownership interests (the State of California, Los Angeles County, and the City of Los Angeles) and meets on a quarterly basis. Under the lease, the university has year-round day-to-day management and operation responsibility for both the Coliseum and BMO Stadium properties. USC's Vice President of Auxiliary Services is the Chief Operating Officer of the Los Angeles Memorial Coliseum, and Coliseum staff are university employees.

Until 2013, the Commission directly operated the stadium under a series of mostly one and two year agreements with USC to rent the stadium for home football games. In 2006, the commission began focusing on signing a long-term lease with USC. After a rejected offer to purchase the stadium outright and a threat to move to the Rose Bowl in late 2007, the two sides signed a 25-year lease in May 2008, giving the Commission 8% of USC's ticket sales (approximately $1.5 million annually), but committing the agency to a list of renovations. These failed to materialize, and in July 2013, the Commission and USC implemented a significantly more extensive 98-year master lease agreement that transferred the long-term management, operation of both the Coliseum and the adjacent BMO Stadium property to USC. The agreement required the university to make approximately $100 million in initial physical repairs to the Coliseum, along with $1.3 million each year in rent to the State of California, maintenance of the Coliseum's physical condition at the same standard used on the USC Campus, and assumption of all financial obligations for the operations and maintenance of the Coliseum and BMO Stadium Complex.

=== Naming rights ===
The Coliseum Commission initially put the naming rights of the Coliseum on the market in June 2008, predicting a deal valued at $6 million to $8 million a year. On January 29, 2018 USC announced that Chicago-based United Airlines would become the stadium's first naming rights partner. Originally, Memorial Coliseum was to be retained in the name of the stadium by the condition of the Coliseum Commission's requirement in its master lease agreement with USC. However, veterans groups and the new president of the Coliseum Commission raised concern about the new name, while United did not approve of any change from the stadium and stated that they were willing to step away from the deal. USC suggested the name United Airlines Field at Los Angeles Memorial Coliseum instead of the planned United Airlines Memorial Coliseum. Although United also did not support this and considered withdrawal, the two parties agreed to the name on June 7, 2019. During Los Angeles Rams home games for the 2019 season, the stadium reverted to its original name, and all signage indicating "United Airlines Field" was covered due to the franchise's sponsoring partnership with American Airlines.

== Tenants and notable events ==
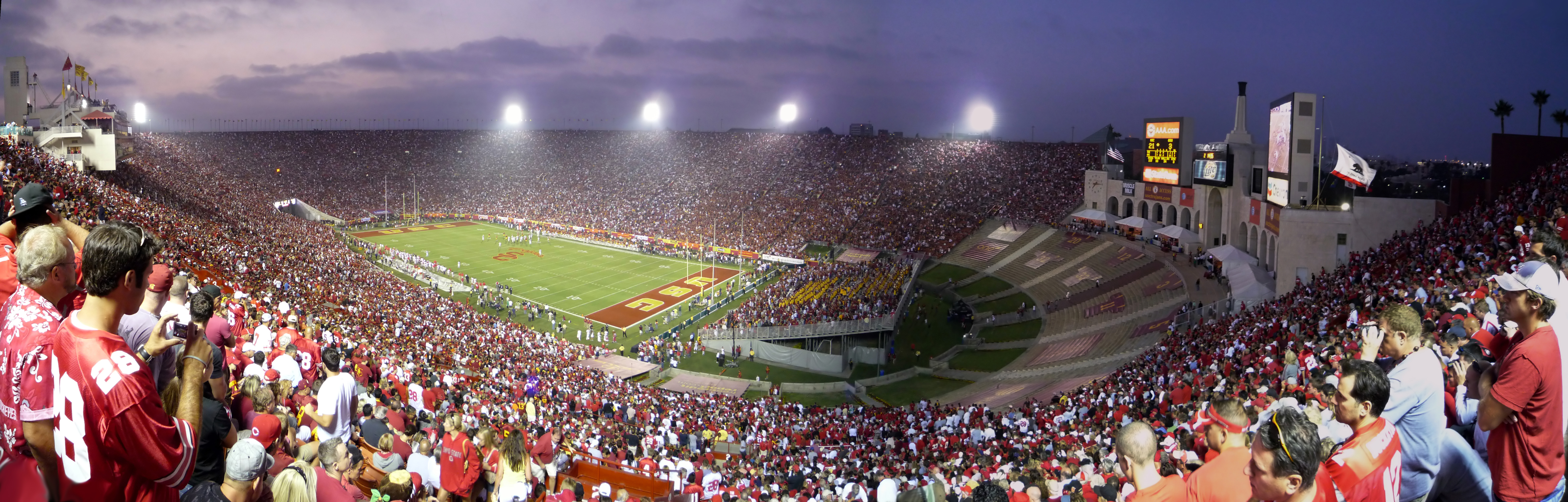

=== University of Southern California ===
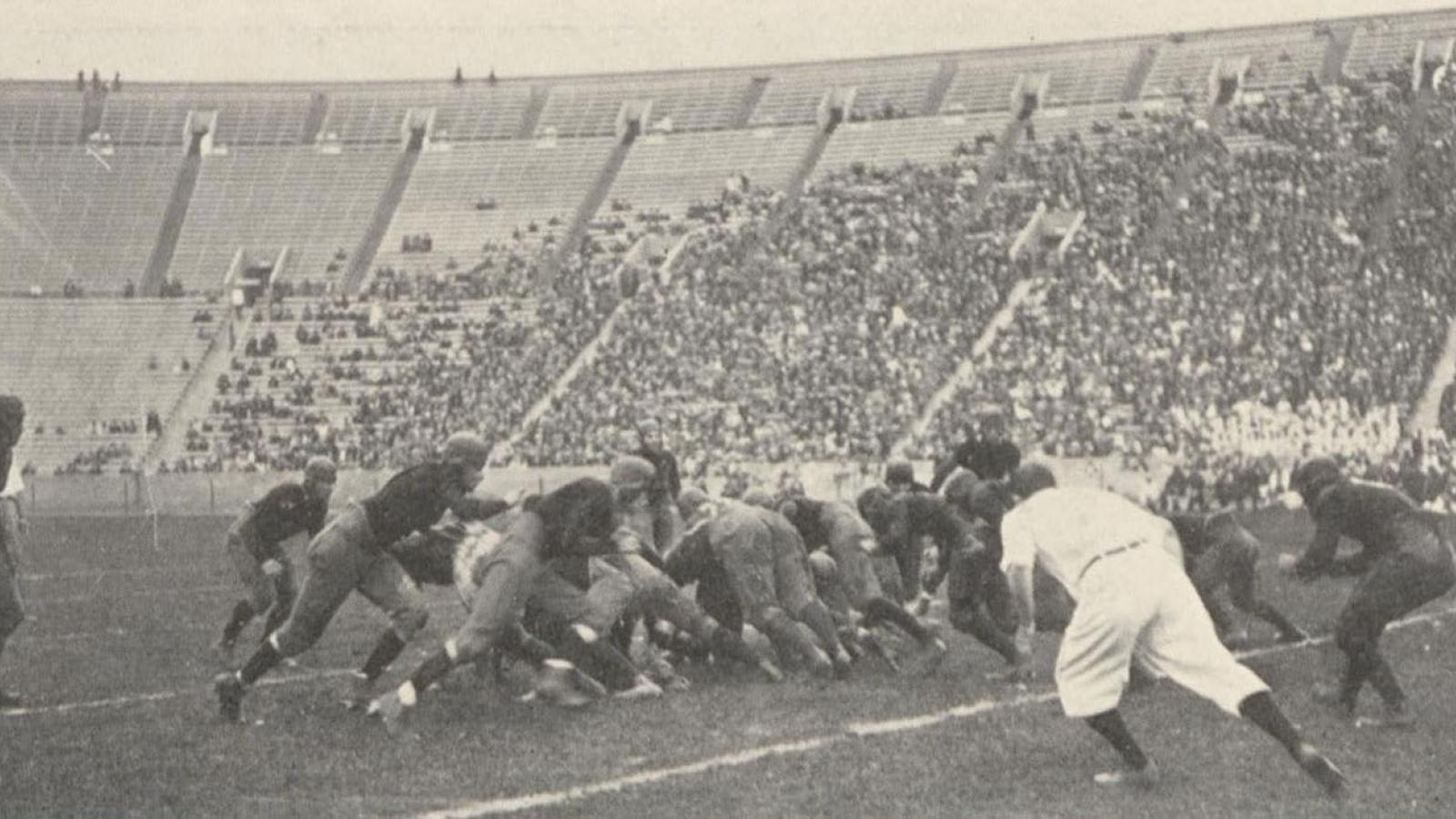
The inaugural game at the Coliseum between Pomona and USC

The Coliseum is primarily the home of the USC Trojans football team. With its campus across the street from Exposition Park, USC agreed to play all its home games at the Coliseum, justifying the decision to build the arena. On October 6, 1923, Pomona and USC played in the inaugural game at the Coliseum, with the Trojans prevailing 23–7. Most of USC's regular home football games, especially with rivals UCLA and Notre Dame, attract a capacity crowd. USC's women lacrosse and soccer teams use the Coliseum for selected games, usually involving major opponents and televised games.

In May 2021, due to the previous year of local COVID-19 restrictions, USC held commencement ceremonies in the Coliseum for graduating students from the classes of 2020 and 2021. Ceremonies were held in the Coliseum twice a day for a week, with over 36,000 diplomas (including undergraduate and graduate degrees and certificates) awarded. It was the first time in 70 years that USC had held its commencement in the stadium. In September 2024 the university announced that its main commencement ceremony was regularly attracting more than 60,000 guests and had outgrown all venues on campus, and beginning with the May 2025 ceremony it would be permanently moving to the Coliseum.

=== University of California, Los Angeles ===
From 1928 to 1981, the UCLA Bruins also played home games at the Coliseum. When USC and UCLA played each other, the "home" team (USC in odd-numbered years, UCLA in even), occupied the north sideline and bench, and its band and rooters sat on the north side of the stadium; the "visiting" team and its contingent took to the south (press box) side of the stadium. Excepting the mid-1950s and 1983–2007, the two teams have worn their home jerseys for the rivalry games for the Victory Bell. This tradition was renewed in 2008, even though the two schools now play at different stadiums. UCLA moved to the Rose Bowl in Pasadena in 1982.

=== Olympic Games ===
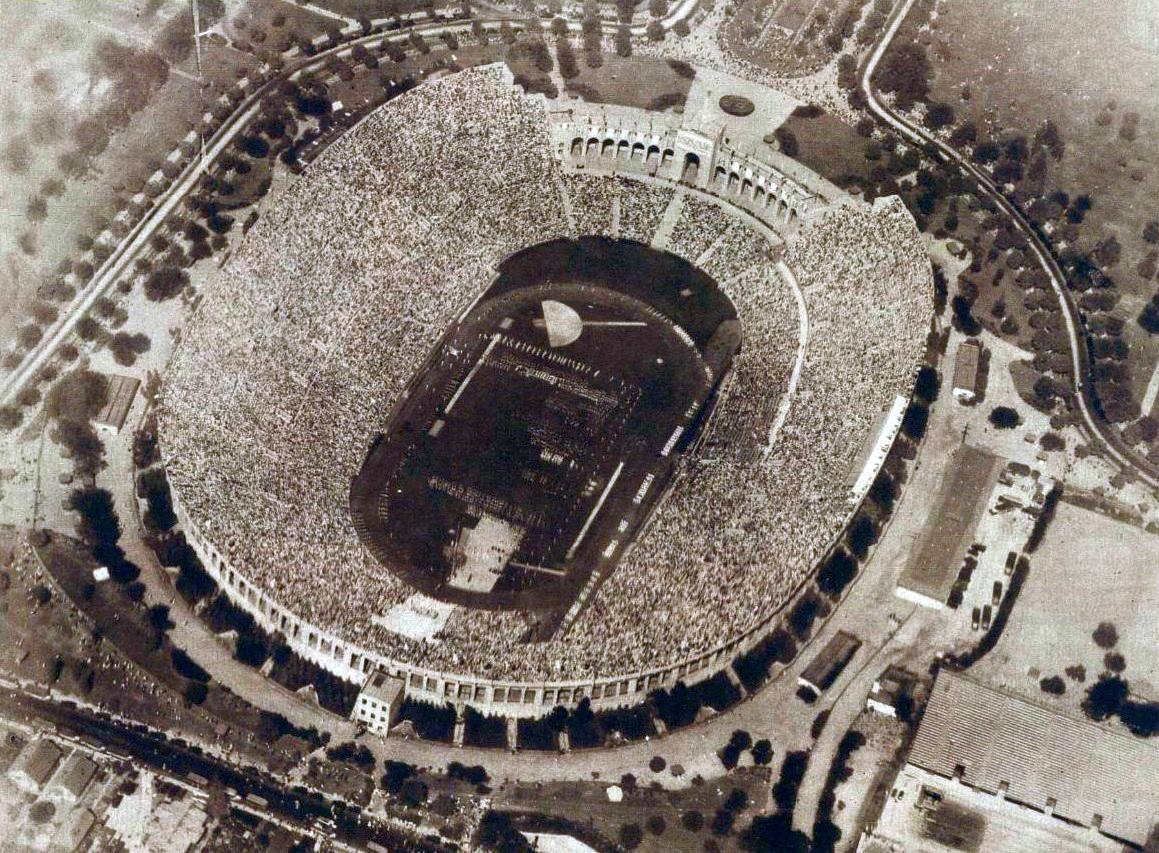
1932 Summer Olympics at the Coliseum

In 1932, the Coliseum hosted the Summer Olympic Games, the first of two Olympic Games hosted at the stadium. The Coliseum served as the site of the field hockey, gymnastics, the show jumping part of the equestrian event, and track and field events, along with the opening and closing ceremonies. The 1932 games marked the introduction of the Olympic Village, as well as the victory podium.

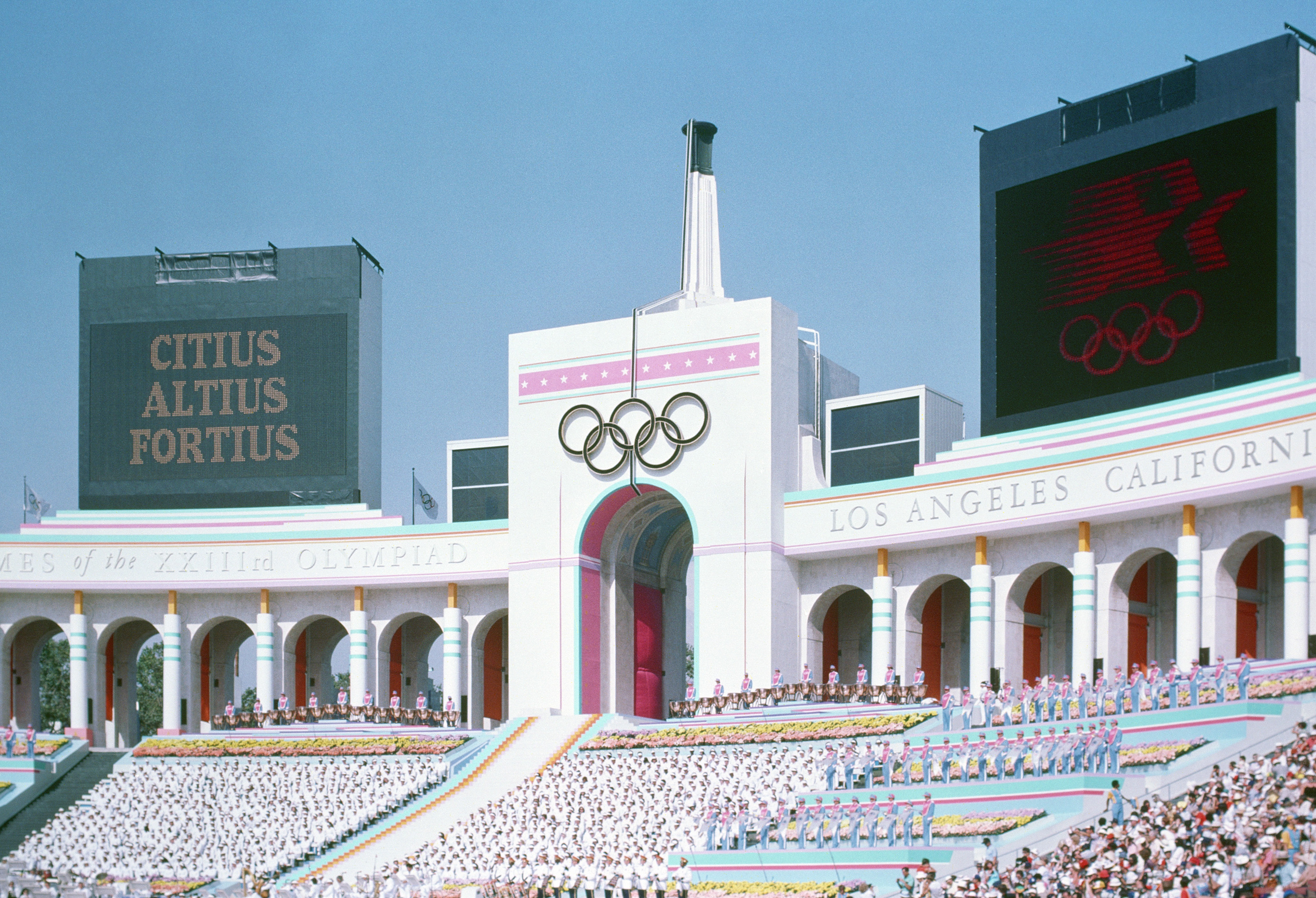
The Coliseum during the opening ceremony of the 1984 Summer Olympics

Los Angeles hosted the 1984 Summer Olympics, and the Coliseum became the first stadium to host the Summer Olympic Games twice, again serving as the primary track and field venue and as the site of the opening and closing ceremonies.

The Los Angeles Memorial Coliseum will host athletics during the 2028 Summer Olympics and Paralympics as well as the closing ceremonies of both events. The Coliseum will be the first stadium to host these Olympic events for three different editions of the Olympic games.

=== Professional Football ===
==== Los Angeles Rams ====
The Cleveland Rams of the National Football League moved to the Coliseum in 1946, becoming the Los Angeles Rams; however, the team later moved again, first to Anaheim in 1980, then to St. Louis in 1995, only to move back to Los Angeles in 2016.

The Los Angeles Rams played the San Francisco 49ers before an NFL record attendance of 102,368 on November 10, 1957. This was a record paid attendance that stood until September 2009 at Cowboys Stadium.

In 1958 the Rams averaged 83,680 for their six home games, including 100,470 for the Chicago Bears and 100,202 for the Baltimore Colts.

The Los Angeles Rams played their home games in the Coliseum until 1979, when they moved to Anaheim before the 1980 NFL season. They hosted the NFC Championship Game in 1975 and 1978, in which they lost both times to the Dallas Cowboys by lopsided margins.

On January 12, 2016, the NFL gave permission for the St. Louis Rams to move back to Los Angeles. The Rams resumed play at the Coliseum while awaiting completion of SoFi Stadium in Inglewood.

On August 13, 2016, the Coliseum hosted its first NFL game at the stadium since 1994, as the Rams hosted the Dallas Cowboys at a preseason game in front of 89,140 people. On September 18, 2016, the Coliseum hosted the first Rams regular season home game since 1979, against the Seattle Seahawks following an impromptu pregame concert from the Red Hot Chili Peppers. The Rams would boast a 9–3 victory over Seattle in front of a crowd of 91,046—the largest attendance for a Rams game at the Coliseum since 1974.

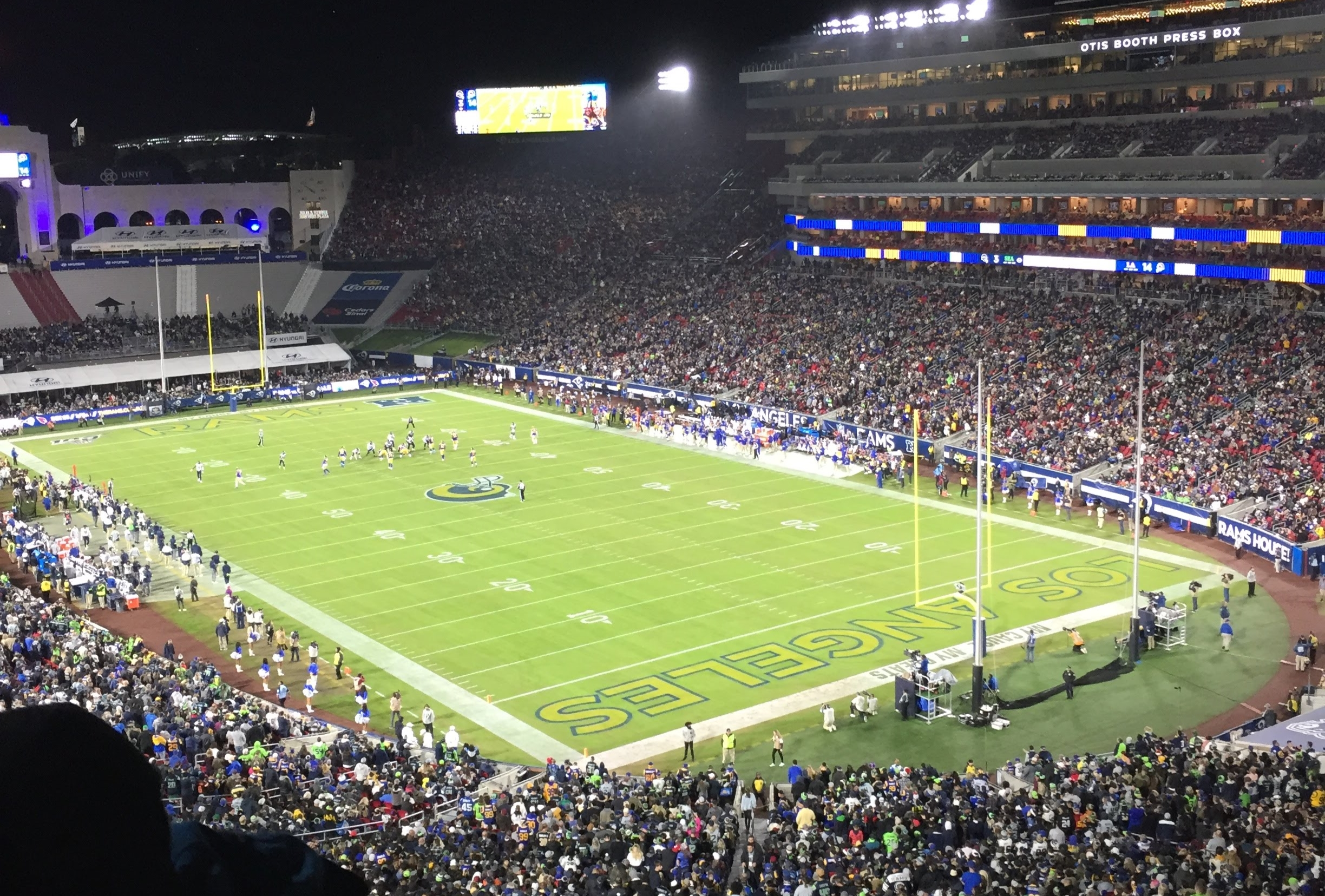
The Rams manage to get a home victory against the Seattle Seahawks during the 2019 season, their final season at the Coliseum before the opening of Sofi Stadium

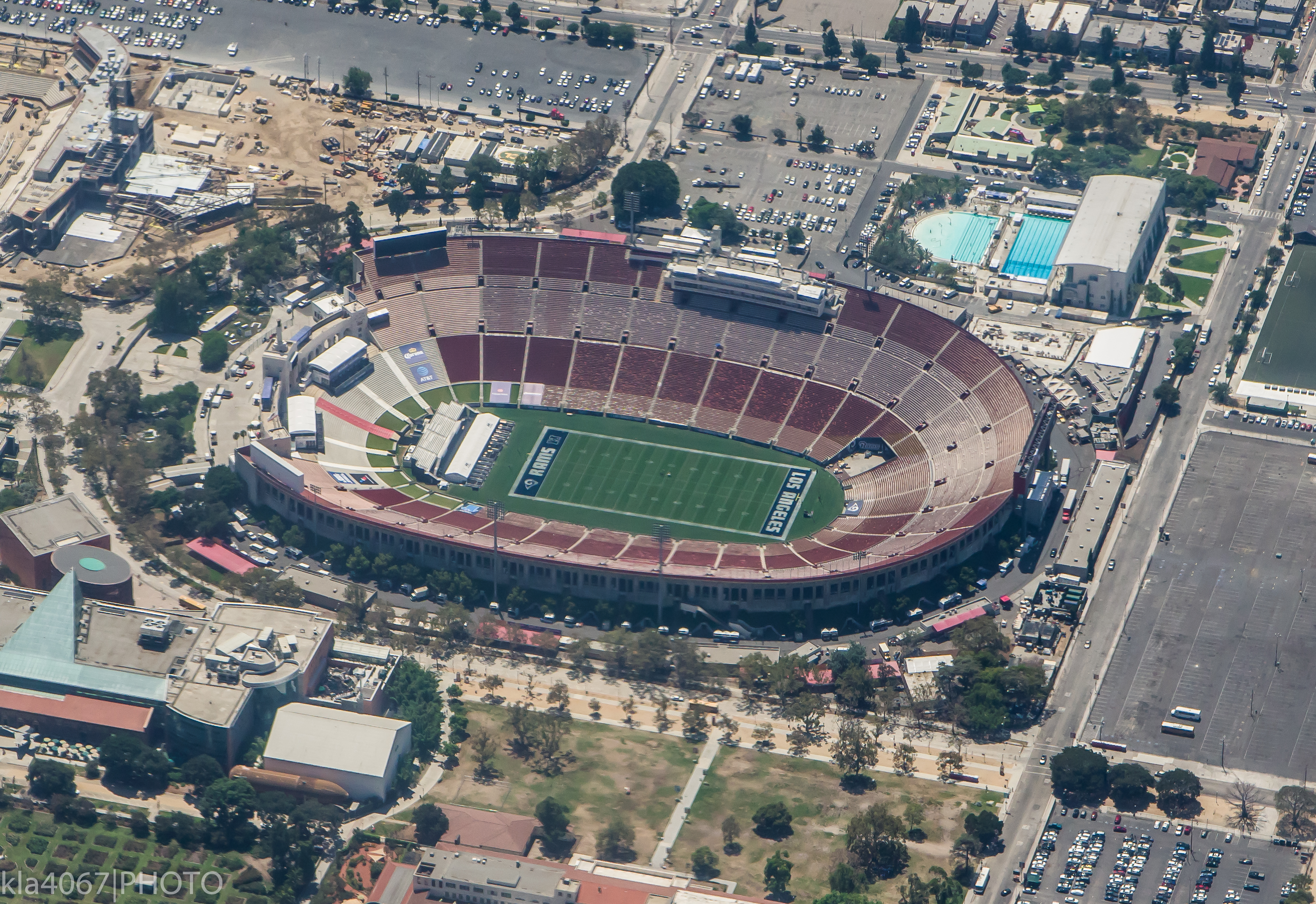
Aerial view of the Coliseum with the Los Angeles Rams field; BMO Stadium is being built in the background, August 2017

On January 6, 2018, the Coliseum hosted its first Rams playoff game since the 1978 NFC Championship game, a 26–13 wild card round loss to the defending NFC champion Atlanta Falcons. On November 19, 2018, the Coliseum hosted its first Monday Night Football game since 1985, with the Rams taking on the Kansas City Chiefs. That game, which was originally scheduled to be played at Estadio Azteca in Mexico City that night, was moved to the Coliseum due to poor field conditions at the former. The Rams won the game, 54–51 in the highest-scoring game in Monday Night Football history.

On January 12, 2019, the Coliseum hosted its most recent NFL playoff game, where the Rams defeated the Dallas Cowboys 30–22 in an NFC Divisional Playoff. The most recent Sunday Night Football game played at the Coliseum was on December 8, 2019, in which the Rams defeated the rival Seattle Seahawks 28–12 in front of a crowd of over 77,000 people.

On December 29, 2019, the Rams played their final game at the Coliseum, beating the Arizona Cardinals 31–24 before moving to SoFi Stadium in time for the 2020 NFL season. The Rams finished with a record of 16–14 playing their home games at the Coliseum in their second stint as tenants from 2016 through 2019. On February 16, 2022, three days after winning Super Bowl LVI, the Rams hosted their victory celebration before thousands of fans in front of the Coliseum's peristyle end.

==== Los Angeles Raiders ====
In 1982, the former Oakland Raiders moved in. The Raiders began looking to move out of the Coliseum as early as 1986. In addition to the delays in renovating the stadium, they never drew well; even after they won Super Bowl XVIII in 1984, they had trouble filling it. The NFL scheduled all of the Raiders' appearances on Monday Night Football as road games since the Los Angeles market would have been blacked out due to the Coliseum not being sold out. Finally, in 1995, the Raiders left Los Angeles and returned to Oakland, leaving the Coliseum without a professional football tenant for the first time since the close of World War II.

In their 13 seasons in Los Angeles the Raiders on several occasions drew near-capacity crowds to the Coliseum. The largest were 91,505 for an October 25, 1992, game with the Dallas Cowboys, 91,494 for a September 29, 1991, contest with the San Francisco 49ers, and 90,380 on January 1, 1984, for a playoff game with the Pittsburgh Steelers.

==== Championship games ====
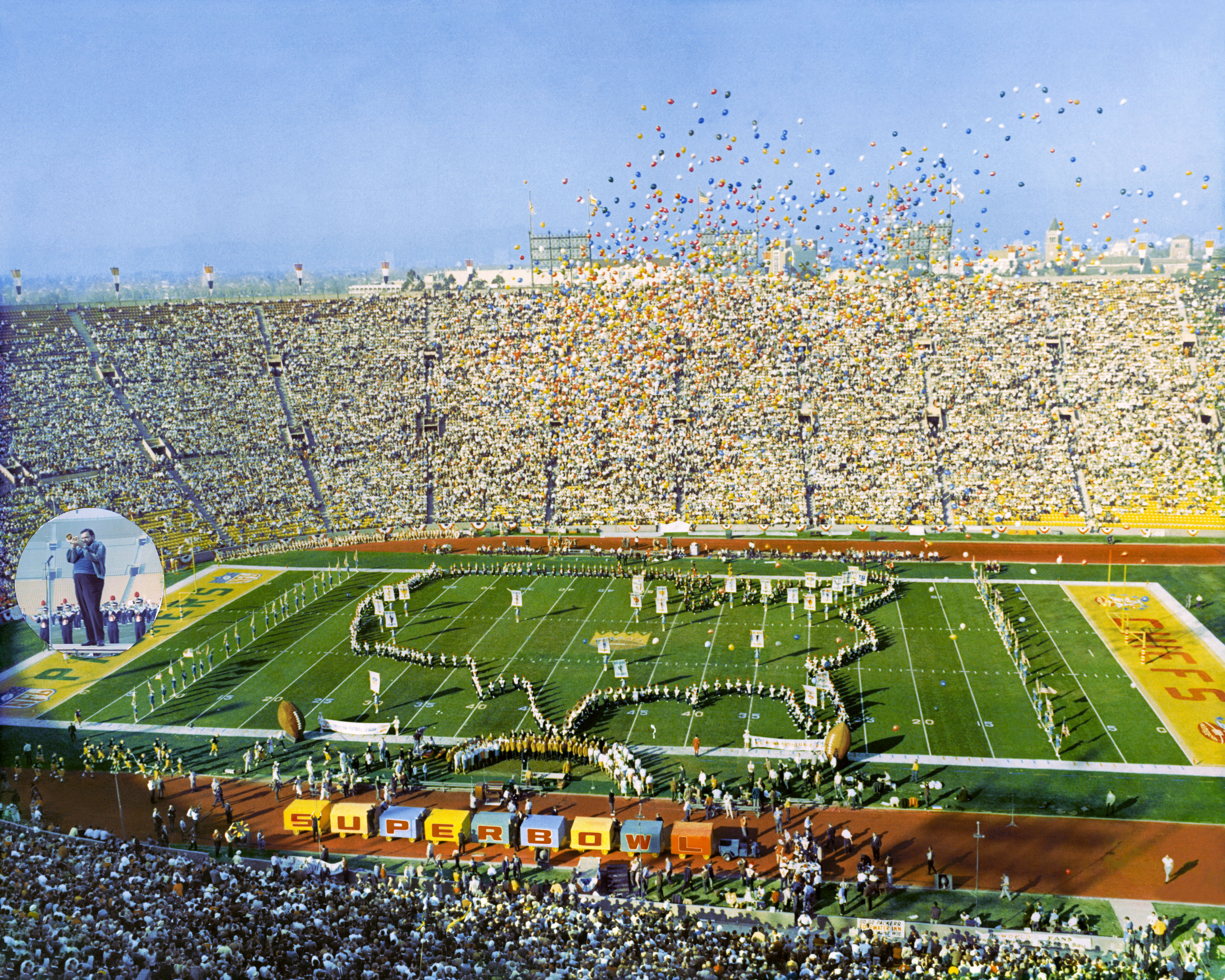
Los Angeles Memorial Coliseum during Super Bowl I

The Rams hosted the 1949, 1951, and 1955 NFL championship games at the Coliseum. The Coliseum was also the site of the NFL Pro Bowl from 1951 to 1972, and again in 1979.

The Coliseum was the site of the first AFL–NFL World Championship Game in 1967, an event since renamed the Super Bowl. The January 15, 1967, game between the Green Bay Packers against the Kansas City Chiefs attracted 61,946 fans—a lower-than anticipated crowd (by comparison, a regular-season game between the Packers and Rams a month earlier drew 72,418).

It also hosted Super Bowl VII in 1973, which matched the Miami Dolphins against the Washington Redskins, with attendance at a near-capacity 90,182, a record that would stand until Super Bowl XI at the Rose Bowl. The Dolphins became the only team in NFL history to attain an undefeated season and postseason. Future Super Bowls in the Los Angeles region would instead be hosted at the Rose Bowl, which has never had an NFL tenant.

The 1975 NFC Championship Game between the Los Angeles Rams and Dallas Cowboys had an attendance of 88,919, the highest for an NFC Championship Game.

The 1983 AFC Championship Game between the Raiders and Seattle Seahawks then attracted 91,445, still the largest crowd for a conference championship game since the conference-title format began with the 1970 season.

==== Other professional football teams ====
The Los Angeles Dons of the All-America Football Conference played in the Coliseum from 1946 to 1949, when the franchise merged with its NFL cousins just before the two leagues merged.

In 1960, the American Football League (AFL)'s Los Angeles Chargers played at the Coliseum before moving to San Diego the next year; the team moved back to the L.A. area in 2017.

The Coliseum was also home to the USFL's Los Angeles Express between 1983 and 1985. However, Express games, like those of the Rams and Raiders before them, were frequently swallowed up in the environment. It was so cavernous that even crowds of 25,000 people, a decent-sized crowd by USFL standards, looked sparse. During their run, the Express hosted the longest professional American football game in history: on June 30, 1984 (a few weeks before the start of the 1984 Summer Olympics), a triple-overtime game between the Express and the Michigan Panthers that was decided on a 24-yard game-winning touchdown by Mel Gray of the Express, three and a half minutes into the third overtime, to give Los Angeles a 27–21 win. Until 2012, this game marked the only time in the history of professional football that there was more than one kickoff in overtime play in the same game.

In 2000, the Los Angeles Dragons of the Spring Football League used the Coliseum as their home stadium. The Legends Football League began as a halftime spectacular known as the Lingerie Bowl. The first three years (2004, 2005, and 2006) were played at the Coliseum. From 2009 to 2011, a couple of Los Angeles Temptation games were played in the Coliseum. Beginning in 2015, the Temptation resumed playing at the Coliseum after three seasons at Citizens Business Bank Arena in Ontario.

=== Major League Baseball ===
Field dimensions for Major League Baseball from 1958 to 1961

Major League Baseball (MLB) games began at the Coliseum when the Brooklyn Dodgers of the National League moved to the West Coast in 1958. The Dodgers played here until Dodger Stadium was completed in time for the 1962 season. The Coliseum was ill-suited even as a temporary baseball venue due to the fundamentally different sizes and shapes of football and baseball fields. A baseball field requires roughly 2.5 times more area than a football gridiron, but the playing surface was just barely large enough to accommodate a baseball diamond. As a result, foul territory was almost nonexistent down the first base line, but was expansive down the third base line, with a very large backstop for the catcher. Sight lines also left much to be desired; some seats were as far as 710 feet (216 m) from the plate.

Even allowing for its temporary status, the corners that were cut in order to shoehorn even an approximation of a baseball field onto the playing surface were especially severe. The left-field fence was set at only 251 feet (77 m) from the plate. This seemed likely to ensure that there would be many "Chinese home runs", as such short shots were called at the time. Sportswriters began jokingly referring to the improvised park as "O'Malley's Chinese Theatre" or "The House that Charlie Chan Built", drawing protests from the Chinese American community in the Los Angeles area. They also expressed concern that cherished home run records, especially Babe Ruth's 1927 seasonal mark of 60, might be in danger. Sports Illustrated titled a critical editorial "Every Sixth Hit a Homer!" Players also complained, with Milwaukee Braves ace Warren Spahn calling for a rule that would require any home run to travel at least 300 feet (91 m) before it could be considered a home run.

Baseball Commissioner Ford Frick ordered the Dodgers to erect a 42 feet (12.8 m) screen in left field to prevent 251-foot pop flies from becoming home runs. Its cables, towers, wires, and girders were in play. The "short porch" in left field looked extremely attractive to batters. In the first week of play during the 1959 season, the media's worst preseason fears seemed to be realized when 24 home runs were hit in the Coliseum, three of them by Chicago Cubs outfielder Lee Walls, not especially distinguished as a hitter. However, pitchers soon adapted, throwing outside to right-handed hitters, requiring them to pull the bat hard if they wanted to hit toward left. Perhaps no player took better advantage than Dodgers outfielder Wally Moon, who figured out how to hit high fly balls that dropped almost vertically just behind the screen. By the end of the season, he had hit 19 homers, all but five of them in the Coliseum. In recognition, such homers were dubbed "Moon Shots".

Nonetheless, the number of home runs alarmed Frick enough that he ordered the Dodgers to build a second screen in the stands, 333 ft (101 m) from the plate. A ball would have had to clear both screens to be a home run; if it cleared the first, it would have been a ground-rule double. However, the Dodgers discovered that the earthquake safety provisions of the Los Angeles building code forbade construction of a second screen.

Unable to compel the Dodgers to fix the situation, the major leagues passed a note to Rule 1.04 stating that any stadium constructed after June 1, 1958, must provide a minimum distance of 325 feet (99 m) down each foul line. Also, when the expansion Los Angeles Angels joined the American League in 1961, Frick vetoed their original request to use the Coliseum as a temporary facility. This rule was revoked (or perhaps, simply ignored) when the Baltimore Orioles launched the "retro ballpark" era in 1992, with the opening of Oriole Park at Camden Yards. With a right field corner of only 318 feet (97 m), this fell short. However, baseball fans heartily welcomed the "new/old" style, and all new ballparks since then have been allowed to set their own distances.

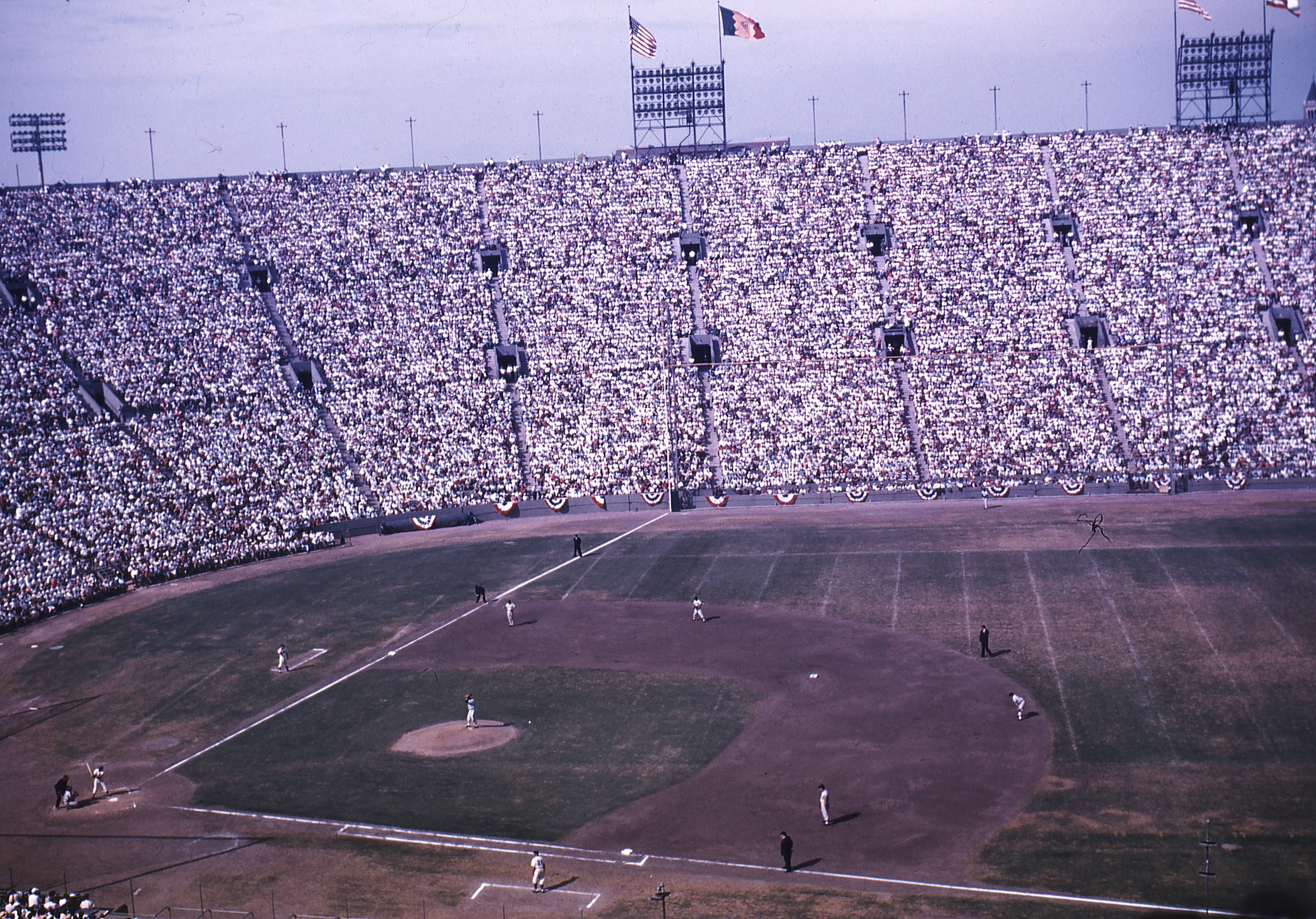
The Coliseum during the 1959 World Series (LA Dodgers and Chicago White Sox)

Late that season, the screen figured in the National League pennant race. When the Braves were playing the Dodgers at the Coliseum on September 15, 1959, Joe Adcock hit a ball that cleared the screen but hit a steel girder behind it and got stuck in the mesh. According to ground rules, this should have been a home run. However, the umpires ruled it a ground-rule double. The fans shook the screen, causing the ball to fall into the seats. The umpires changed the call to a homer, only to rule it a ground-rule double while Adcock was left stranded on second. The game was tied at the end of nine innings, and the Dodgers won in the tenth inning. At the end of the regular season, the Dodgers and Braves finished in a tie. The Dodgers won the ensuing playoff and went on to win the World Series.

Although less than ideal for baseball due to its poor sight lines and short dimensions (left field at 251 feet (77 m) and power alleys at 320 feet (98 m)), the Coliseum was ideally suited for large paying crowds. Each of the three games of the 1959 World Series drew over 92,000 fans, with game five drawing 92,706, a record unlikely to be seriously threatened anytime soon given the smaller seating capacities of modern baseball parks. In May 1959, an exhibition game between the Dodgers and the New York Yankees in honor of legendary catcher Roy Campanella drew 93,103, the largest crowd ever to see a baseball game in the Western Hemisphere until a 2008 exhibition game between the Los Angeles Dodgers and the Boston Red Sox to mark the 50th anniversary of MLB in Los Angeles. The Coliseum also hosted the second 1959 MLB All-Star Game.

The largest regular season attendance was 78,672, the Dodgers' home debut in the Coliseum, against the San Francisco Giants on April 18, 1958.

In May 1959, the Dodgers had hosted an exhibition game against the reigning World Series champion New York Yankees at the Coliseum, a game which drew over 93,000 people, an MLB record until 2008. The Yankees won that game 6–2. All three Dodgers home games in the 1959 World Series with the Chicago White Sox exceeded 90,000 attendance. Game 5 drew 92,706 fans, a major league record for a non-exhibition game.

As part of their West Coast 50th anniversary celebration in 2008, the Dodgers again hosted an exhibition game against the reigning World Series champions, the Boston Red Sox. On March 29, 2008, the middle game of a three-game set in Los Angeles was also won by the visitors by the relatively low score of 7–4, given the layout of the field; Red Sox catcher Jason Varitek had joked that he expected scores in the 80s. The attendance for the game was 115,300, setting a new Guinness World Record for attendance at a baseball game.

Between 1958 and 1961, the distance from home plate to the left field foul pole was 251 feet (76.5 m) with a 42-foot (13 m) screen running across the close part of left field. Due to the intervening addition of another section of seating rimming the field, the 2008 grounds crew had much less space to work with, and the result was a left field foul line only 201 ft long (61.3 m), with a 60-foot (18 m) screen, which one Boston writer dubbed the "Screen Monster". Even at that distance, 201 feet (61 m) is also 49 ft (14.9 m) short of the minimum legal home-run distance. This being an exhibition game, balls hit over the 60 ft (18 m) temporary screen were still counted as home runs. There were only a couple of home runs over the screen, as pitchers adjusted (and Manny Ramirez did not play). A diagram illustrated the differences in the dimensions between 1959 and 2008:

2008 – LF 201 ft (61.3 m) – LCF 280 ft (85.3 m) – CF 380 ft (115.8 m) – RCF 352 ft (107.3 m) – RF 300 ft (91.4 m)
1959 – LF 251 ft (76.5 m) – LCF 320 ft (97.5 m) – CF 417 ft (127.1 m) – RCF 375 ft (114.3 m) – RF 300 ft (91.4 m)

A sellout crowd of 115,300 was announced, which set a Guinness World Record for attendance at a baseball game, breaking the record set at a 1956 Summer Olympics baseball demonstration game between teams from the US and Australia at the Melbourne Cricket Ground.

In the mid-1990s, the Coliseum was planned to be the home of the Los Angeles Blaze, a charter franchise of the United League (UL) which was planned to be a third league of Major League Baseball.

=== Soccer ===
The first official soccer match at the Coliseum was an international fixture between the United States and Mexico that took place on March 7, 1965, as part of regional World Cup qualification. The teams drew 2–2 in front of 22,570 spectators.

Although the stadium represents the second most active venue in the history of the US national team (after RFK Memorial Stadium in Washington, D.C.), the USMNT has only played 22 matches in the Coliseum, the most recent in 2000. Of these, 11 were in official competition (three from World Cup qualifiers, seven from the CONCACAF Gold Cup and one from the North American Nations Cup) and 11 friendlies, all category "A". The team won their first absolute title by finishing as champion of the 1991 CONCACAF Gold Cup, defeating their counterpart from Honduras on penalties. Since 2000, the team has preferred the Rose Bowl Stadium and Dignity Health Sports Park as home stadiums in the Los Angeles area.

The Coliseum also staged the final match of the Gold Cup in 1996, 1998 and 2000. The Coliseum hosted the fifth-place game, third-place game and final of the 2014 Copa Centroamericana in front of 41,969 spectators.

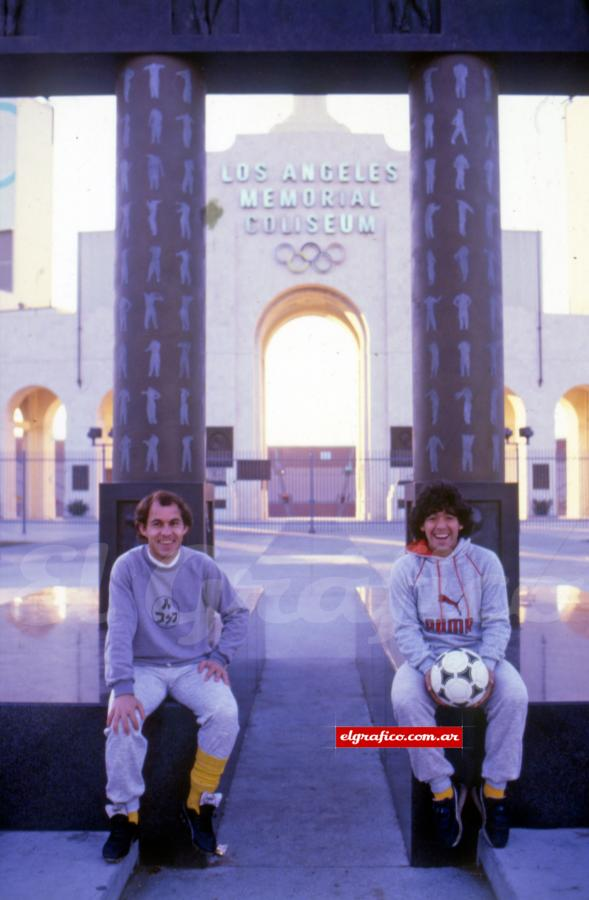
Soccer players Ricardo Bochini and Diego Maradona at the Coliseum, where Argentina played against Mexico in May 1985.

Mexico is the most active national team at the Coliseum; it is the second most used venue by the team, after only the team's official headquarters at Estadio Azteca. Of their 14 competitive matches at the Coliseum, three were in the World Cup qualifying round, nine were in the Gold Cup, and two from the North American Nations Cup, including the Gold Cup finals from 1996 and 1998. Of their 72 friendly matches at the Coliseum, 50 were Category "A" (against other senior teams), 6 were Category "B", and 16 were against both Mexican and foreign clubs. The Argentina national soccer team played a friendly match against Mexico on May 14, 1985, as part of Argentina's tour of North America before the 1986 FIFA World Cup that would be won by the squad managed by Carlos Bilardo.

The stadium hosted the Los Angeles Wolves during the inaugural season of the United Soccer Association in 1967, which culminated in the final championship at the Coliseum. The Los Angeles Toros of the National Professional Soccer League also played at the Coliseum in 1967, but were moved to San Diego the following season before folding. The Los Angeles Aztecs of the North American Soccer League played at the Coliseum in 1977 and 1981 between stints at the Rose Bowl.

On February 21, 2026, Los Angeles FC opened their season against Inter Miami CF at the stadium, making it the first regular season Major League Soccer game at the stadium. Los Angeles FC won 3–0 in front of 75,673 fans, the second-largest in league history for a standalone regular season match.

=== Other sporting events ===
The Coliseum hosted the NCAA Men's Division I Outdoor Track and Field Championships in 1934, 1939, 1949, and 1955. It also hosted several Coliseum Relays and several Compton-Coliseum Invitational (track and field) events from the 1940s until the 1970s.

In June 1970, the first Senior Olympics (known as the Senior Sports International Meet) took place at the Los Angeles Memorial Coliseum. In July 1972, the Coliseum hosted the "Super Bowl" of Motocross. The event was the first motocross race held inside a stadium. It evolved into the AMA Supercross championship held in stadiums across the United States and Canada. The Coliseum last hosted the event in 1998.

In 1973, Evel Knievel used the entire distance of the stadium to jump 50 stacked cars. Knievel launched his motorcycle from atop one end of the Coliseum, jumping the cars in the center of the field, and stopping high atop the other end. The jump was broadcast on ABC's Wide World of Sports. In conjunction with Evel Knievel's jump, "The World's Richest Demolition Derby" was held, featuring luxury cars and race drivers such as Mario Andretti and Parnelli Jones.

The Mickey Thompson Entertainment Group hosted the first stadium short course off-road race at the Coliseum in 1979. The event was last held in 1992.

The Coliseum was also the site of the 1982 Speedway World Final, held for the first and only time in the United States. The event saw Newport Beach native Bruce Penhall retain the title he had won in front of 92,500 fans at London's Wembley Stadium in 1981. An estimated 40,000 fans were at the Coliseum to see Penhall retain his title before announcing his retirement from motorcycle speedway to take up an acting role on the television series CHiPs.

In 2003, select events of the X Games IX action sports event were held at the Coliseum. In 2010, the X Games XVI were held at the venue.

In 2007 the stadium hosted the K-1 Dynamite!! USA mixed martial arts event. The promoters claimed that 54,000 people attended the event, which would have set a new attendance record for a mixed martial arts event in the United States; however, other officials estimated the crowd between 20,000 and 30,000.

On April 27, 2013, the stadium hosted a round of the Stadium Super Trucks off-road race.

In August 2015, the Coliseum hosted the opening and closing ceremonies for the 2015 Special Olympics World Summer Games.

On June 16, 2018, Shannon Briggs hosted the first press conference for a celebrity boxing event with KSI, Deji, Jake Paul, and Logan Paul.

On February 6, 2022, NASCAR hosted the Busch Light Clash at the Coliseum, a pre-season NASCAR Cup Series exhibition event. The temporary .25-mile (402-meter) track marked the series' first race of any kind on a quarter-mile since 1971 and was won by Joey Logano. Martin Truex Jr. won the 2023 running of the event, followed by Denny Hamlin in 2024. The event was moved to Bowman Gray Stadium in Winston-Salem, North Carolina in 2025.

=== Civic events ===
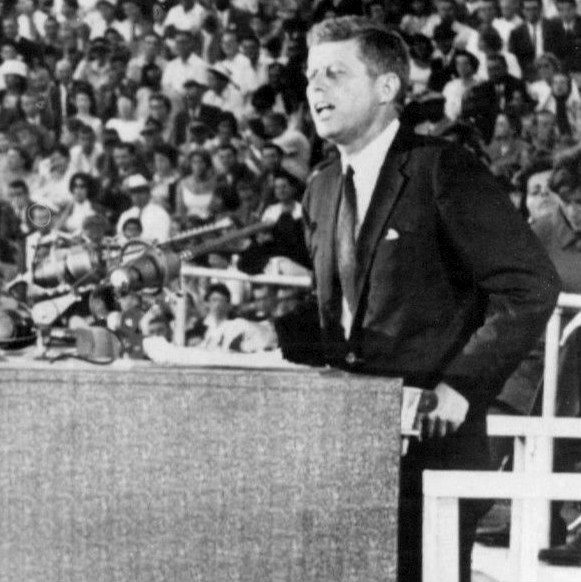
John F. Kennedy delivering his acceptance speech at the Democratic National Convention in 1960.

The Coliseum was the site of John F. Kennedy's memorable acceptance speech at the 1960 Democratic National Convention. It was during that speech that Kennedy first used the term "the New Frontier".

The largest gathering in the Coliseum's history was a Billy Graham crusade on September 8, 1963, with 134,254 in attendance. With the renovations of 1964, the capacity of the Coliseum was reduced to about 93,000 for future events.

On June 17, 2009, the Coliseum was the terminus for the Los Angeles Lakers' 2009 NBA championship victory parade. A crowd of over 90,000 attended the festivities, in addition to the throngs of supporters who lined the 2-mile (3.2 km) parade route. The Coliseum peristyle was redesigned in purple and gold regalia to commemorate the team, and the Lakers' court was transported from Staples Center to the Coliseum field to act as the stage.

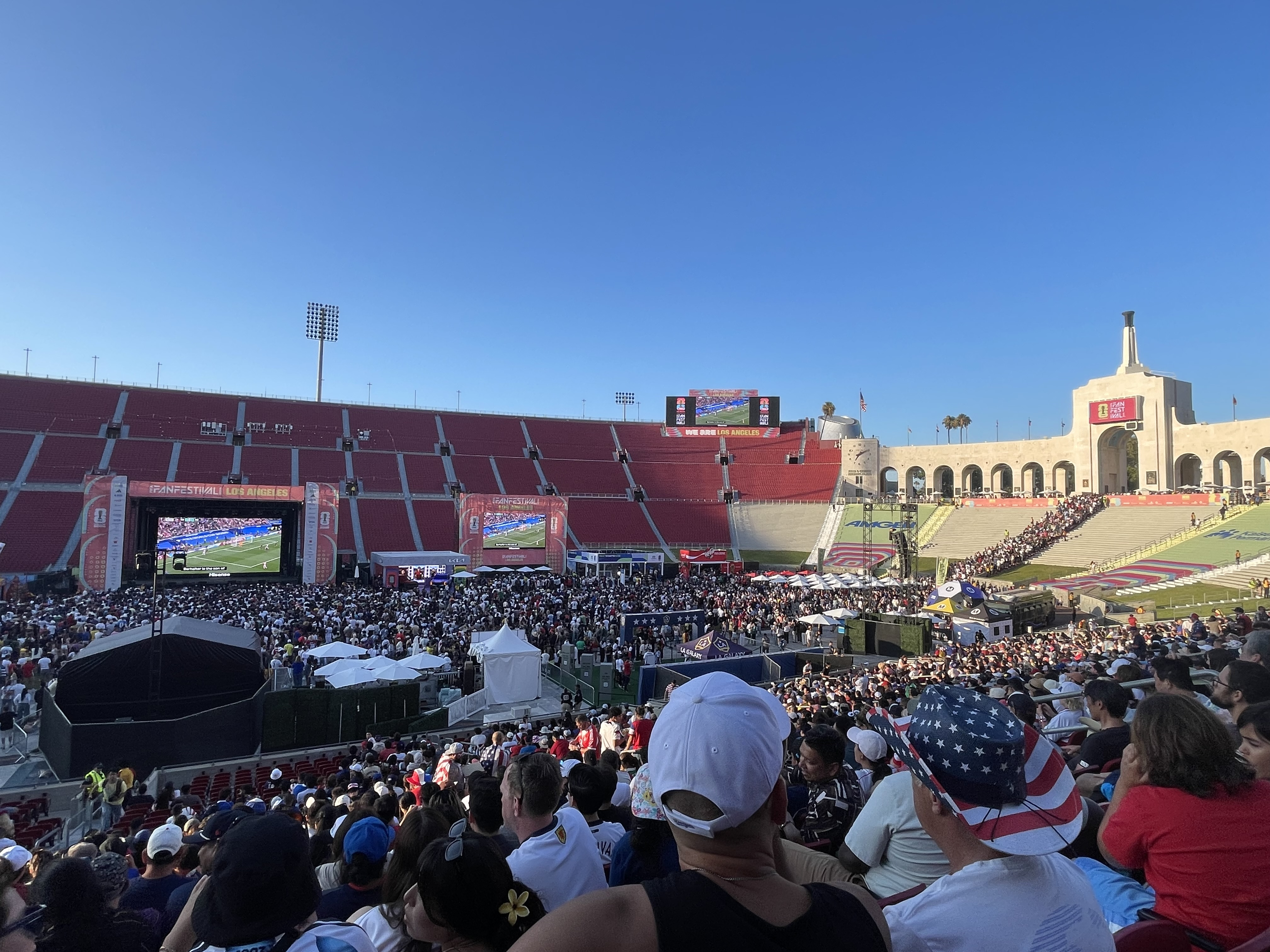
Inside the stadium during a FIFA Fan Festival during the 2026 FIFA World Cup.

The Los Angeles FIFA Fan Festival for the 2026 FIFA World Cup was held at the Coliseum.

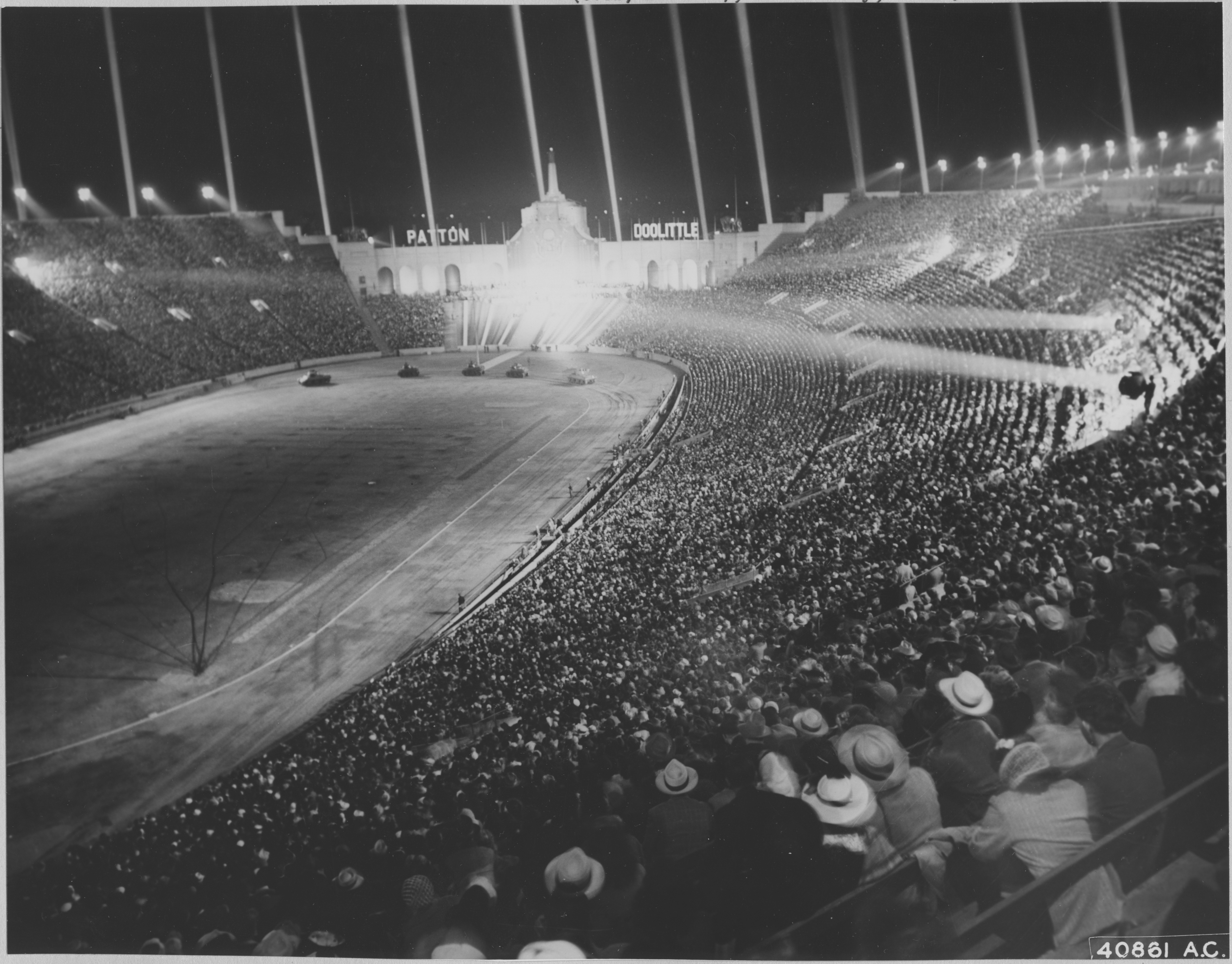
Generals George Patton and Jimmy Doolittle at the Coliseum on June 9, 1945

=== Notable concerts ===
On August 20, 1972, Wattstax, also known as "Black-Woodstock", took place in the Coliseum. Over 100,000 black residents of Los Angeles attended this concert for African-American pride. A documentary was released about the concert in 1973.

The Coliseum played host to the California World Music Festival on April 7–8, 1979.

The Rolling Stones played at the stadium on their 1981 Tattoo You tour (October 9 and 11), supported by George Thorogood, the J. Geils Band, and Prince. Relatively unknown at the time, Prince was not well received by fans and was booed off the stage the first night. He did not intend to return for the second show until he was convinced by Stones frontman Mick Jagger to do so. The Stones played for 90,000 for each of two nights in 1981 and a record 90,000 fans for four nights in 1989.

Bruce Springsteen and the E Street Band concluded their Born in the U.S.A. Tour with four consecutive concerts on September 27, 29, 30, and October 2, 1985, in front of 82,000 people each night. These shows were recorded and eight songs from the show of September 30 appear on their box set Live 1975–85. The September 27 show was released through Springsteen's website in 2019.

U2 played at the stadium during leg three of their breakout Joshua Tree tour on November 17 and 18, 1987. They later returned to the stadium for their PopMart Tour on June 21, 1997. Los Angeles natives Mötley Crüe played at the stadium on December 13, 1987, during the second leg of their Girls, Girls, Girls World Tour, with fellow Los Angeles band Guns N' Roses as the opening act. At that time, Mötley Crüe was one of the most popular and successful acts in the world, while Guns N' Roses was one of the largest up-and-coming acts. The latter would later return for four shows in October 1989 as the opening act for the Rolling Stones, then again on September 27, 1992, as part of their infamous co-headlining tour with Metallica.

The stadium played host to The Monsters of Rock Festival Tour, featuring Van Halen, Scorpions, Dokken, Metallica, and Kingdom Come, on July 24, 1988. A second show was planned to take place on July 23, but was later canceled. The stadium also played host to Amnesty International's Human Rights Now! Benefit Concert on September 21, 1988, headlined by Sting and Peter Gabriel and also featuring Bruce Springsteen and the E Street Band, Tracy Chapman, Youssou N'Dour, and Joan Baez.

The Coliseum formerly hosted the major U.S. electronic dance music festival, the Electric Daisy Carnival. It last hosted the event in 2010; following the drug-related death of an underage attendee at EDC that year, the festival's organizer Insomniac Events was blacklisted from hosting future events at the venue, and the festival subsequently moved to Las Vegas Motor Speedway in 2011.

In 2006, Mexican band RBD held a concert during their U.S. tour before 70,000 people, with tickets sold out in less than 30 minutes. It was the highest-attended event by a Mexican act since Los Bukis' 1993 and 1996 concerts.

On July 30, 2011, the LA Rising festival with Rage Against the Machine, Muse, Rise Against, Lauryn Hill, Immortal Technique, and El Gran Silencio was hosted at the Coliseum. Roger Waters continued his The Wall Live at the stadium on 19 May 2012 to a sold-out crowd.

On December 9, 2021, Kanye West performed a benefit concert for the long-imprisoned Larry Hoover with special guest Drake at the Coliseum.

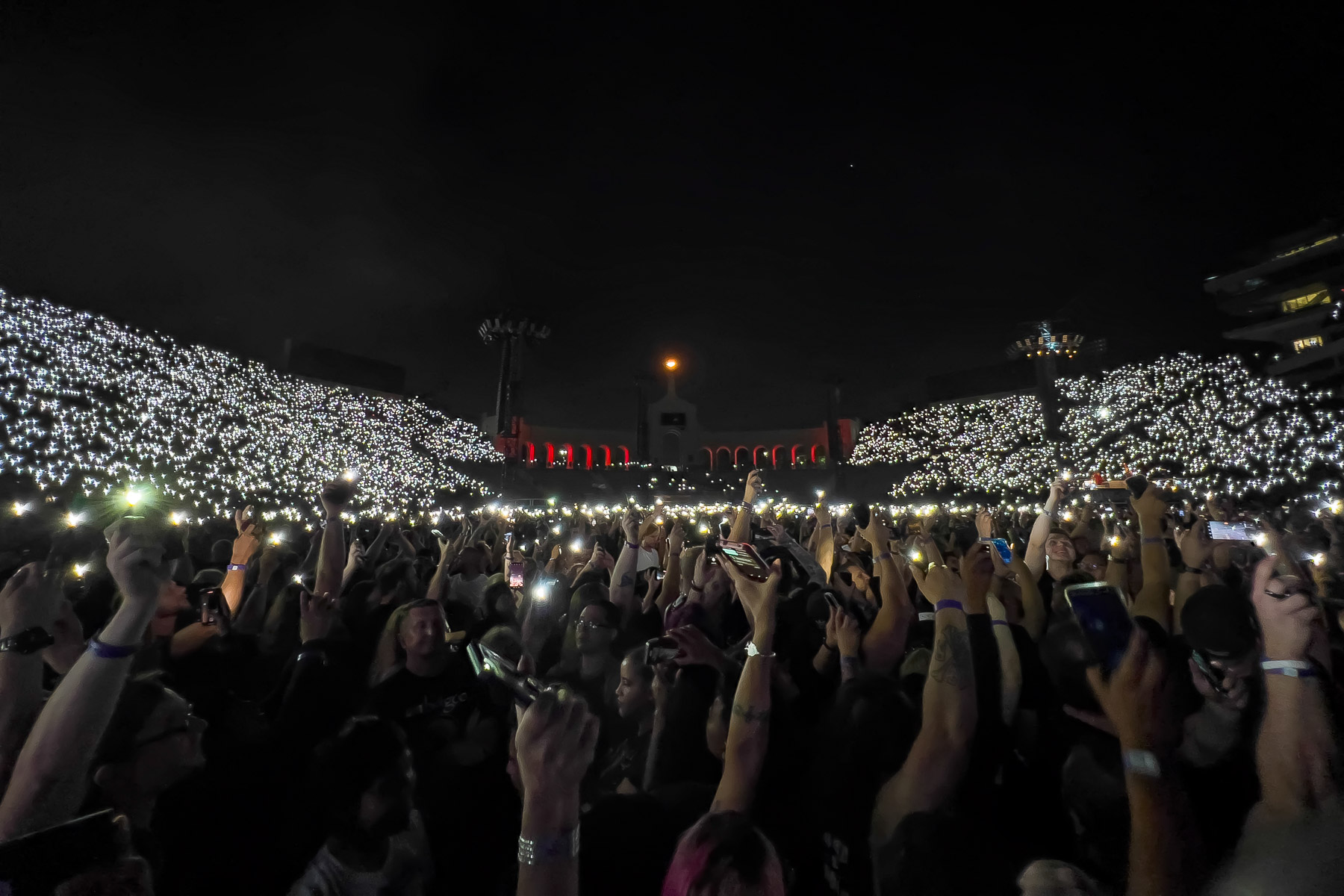
View of the crowd during Rammstein's performance at LA Coliseum, September 2022

On September 23 and 24, 2022 German band Rammstein performed two shows as part of the North American leg of their Rammstein Stadium Tour.

On December 10, 2022, Deadmau5 and Kaskade performed as their collaborative project Kx5 to a crowd of 50,000. Making it the largest ever one-day EDM headlining event in North America at the time.

== Attendance records ==
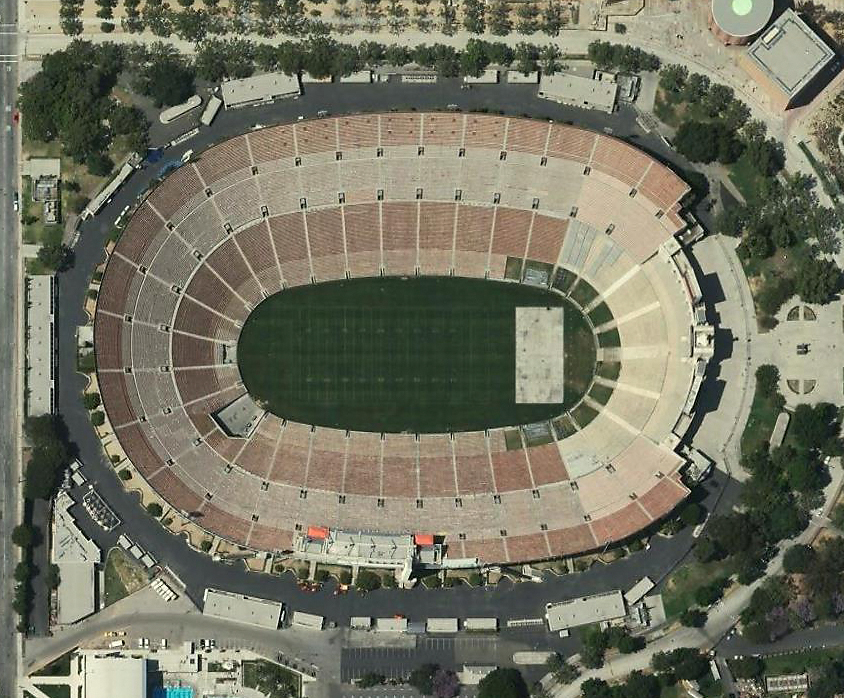
An aerial view of the Coliseum, November 2008

=== Largest recorded crowds ===
Because the Coliseum seated over 100,000 from 1930 until the 1964 renovation, nearly all of its largest crowds predate that work, and several remain records in their respective sports.

| Attendance | Event | Date |
|---|---|---|
| 134,254 | Billy Graham crusade | September 8, 1963 |
| 115,300 | Dodgers vs. Boston Red Sox (exhibition) | March 29, 2008 |
| 104,953 | USC vs. Notre Dame | 1947 |
| 103,303 | USC vs. UCLA † | 1939 |
| 103,000 | UCLA vs. USC † | 1945 |
| 102,548 | UCLA vs. USC | 1954 |
| 102,368 | Los Angeles Rams vs. San Francisco 49ers | November 10, 1957 |
| 102,050 | USC vs. UCLA | 1947 |
| 100,470 | Los Angeles Rams vs. Chicago Bears | 1958 |
| 100,333 | USC vs. UCLA (second meeting) | 1945 |

† Figure appears in the USC media guide but not the UCLA guide; see below.

=== College football ===
Records differ between the 2006 USC football media guide and 2006 UCLA football media guide. (This may be due to only keeping records for "home" games until the 1950s.) The USC Media guide lists the top five record crowds as:

1. 104,953 — vs. Notre Dame 1947 (USC home game; Highest attendance for a football game in the Coliseum)
2. 103,303 — vs. UCLA 1939 (USC home game)
3. 103,000 — vs. USC 1945 (UCLA home game)
4. 102,548 — vs. USC 1954 (UCLA home game)
5. 102,050 — vs. UCLA 1947 (USC home game)

The UCLA Media guide does not list the 1939 game against USC, and only lists attendance for the second game in 1945 for Coliseum attendance records. These are the top three listed UCLA record Coliseum crowds:

1. 102,548 — vs. USC 1954 (UCLA home game)
2. 102,050 — vs. USC 1947 (UCLA home game)
3. 100,333 — vs. USC 1945 (USC home game; 1945's second of two meetings)

The largest crowd to attend a USC football game against an opponent other than UCLA or Notre Dame was 96,130 for a November 10, 1951, contest with Stanford University. The largest attendance for a UCLA contest against a school other than USC was 92,962 for the November 1, 1946, game with Saint Mary's College of California.

== Sculpture and commemorations ==
A pair of life-sized bronze nude statues of male and female athletes atop a 20,000-pound (9,100-kilogram) post-and-lintel frame formed the Olympic Gateway created by Robert Graham for the 1984 games. The statues, modeled on American water polo player Terry Schroeder and American-Guyanese long jumper Jennifer Innis, were noted for their anatomical accuracy. A decorative facade bearing the Olympic rings was erected in front of the peristyle for the 1984 games, and the structure remained in place through that year's football season. The stadium rim and tunnels were repainted in alternating pastel colors that were part of architect Jon Jerde's graphic design for the games; these colors remained until 1987.

=== Court of Honor plaques ===
Between the double peristyle arches at the east end is the Coliseum's "Court of Honor" plaques, recognizing many of the memorable events and participants in its history, including a full list of 1932 and 1984 Olympic gold medalists.

- 1959 Dodgers World Series, 1961
- 1963 Billy Graham Crusade, 1965
- 50th Anniversary of Armistice, 1969
- John C. Argue, 2004
- Count Baillet-Latour, 1964
- Elgin Baylor, 2009
- Joan Benoit, 2017
- Thomas Bradley, 2019
- Judge William A. Bowen, 1955
- Coliseum Commission – 1984 Olympics, 1984
- Coliseum Commission (1933–1944), 1970
- Coliseum Commission (1945–1970), 1970
- Coliseum Commission (1971–1998), 1998
- Coliseum Commission Restoration (1923), 2013
- Coliseum Track and Field Records, 2002
- Community Development Association, 1932
- Pierre de Coubertin, 1958
- Newell "Jeff" Cravath, 1960
- Dean Bartlett Cromwell, 1963
- Anita DeFrantz, 2017
- Mildred "Babe" Didrickson, 1961
- Earthquake Restoration, 1999
- John Ferraro, 2000
- John Jewett Garland, 1972
- William May Garland, 1949
- Kenneth F. Hahn, 1993
- Elmer "Gus" Henderson, 1971
- Paul Hoy Helms, 1958
- Elroy "Crazy Legs" Hirsch, 2005
- Rafer Johnson, 2009
- Thomas LaBonge, 2022
- Israeli Olympic Athletes, 1984
- Pope John Paul II, 1987
- Howard Harding Jones, 1955
- President John F. Kennedy, 1964
- Francis "Frank" Leahy, 1974
- Nelson Mandela, 2014
- James Francis Cardinal McIntyre and Mary's Hour, 1966
- John McKay, 2001
- Mercy Bowl, 1961
- J.D. Morgan, 1984
- Jesse P. Mortensen, 1963
- Jim Murray, 1999
- William Henry "Bill" Nicholas, 1990
- Walter F. O'Malley, 2008
- James Cleveland "Jesse" Owens, 1984
- Charles W. Paddock, 1955
- Rams Reunion, 2007
- Daniel Farrell Reeves, 1972
- Jackie Robinson, 2005
- Knute Rockne, 1955
- Pete Rozelle, 1998
- Henry Russell "Red" Sanders, 1959
- W.R. "Bill" Schroeder, 1990
- Vin Scully, 2008
- Andrew Latham "Andy" Smith, 1956
- William Henry "Bill" Spaulding, 1971
- Bruce Springsteen and the E Street Band, 2016
- Amos Alonzo Stagg, 1965
- Brice Union Taylor, 1975
- USC All-Americans (1880–2005), 2007
- Peter V. Ueberroth, 2022
- Glenn Scobey "Pop" Warner, 1956
- Kenneth Stanley Washington, 1972
- Jerry West, 2009
- John R. Wooden, 2008
- Rosalind Wyman, 2021

=== Coliseum Cauldron ===
The Coliseum Cauldron was built for the 1932 Summer Olympics and was also reused during the 1984 Summer Olympics. It is lit during special events (such as the period when an edition of the Olympic Games are being held in another city or in mourning for some personality related to the city). Among others, the flame has been lit on the following occasions:

- To honor the memory of Israeli athletes killed during the terrorist attack during the 1972 Summer Olympics in Munich
- For several days following the Space Shuttle Challenger disaster in 1986
- For over a week following the September 11 attacks in 2001
- During the official period of mourning after the death of the former American president Ronald Reagan. Reagan declared the 1984 Summer Olympics open in his capacity as president, and was also governor of California from 1967 to 1975.
- In April 2005 after the death of Pope John Paul II, who had celebrated Mass at the Coliseum during his visit to Los Angeles in 1987
- At the Los Angeles Dodgers' 50th anniversary game on March 29, 2008, during the ThinkCure! charity ceremony (while Neil Diamond's "Heartlight" was played and the majority of the attendees turned on their complimentary souvenir keychain flashlights)
- For the 2015 Special Olympics World Summer Games (lit by 1984 Olympic cauldron lighter Rafer Johnson)
- For the returning Los Angeles Rams' first home game on September 18, 2016, against the Seattle Seahawks
- On the evening of September 13, 2017, when Los Angeles was awaiting a few hours before the confirmation as the host city of the 2028 Summer Olympics
- For the Coliseum Gladiator MMA Championship Finals on Sat., September 23, 2017
- For the Los Angeles Rams' first playoff game in Los Angeles in 38 years on January 6, 2018, against the Atlanta Falcons
- To honor the victims of the 2018 California wildfires & the Thousand Oaks shooting
- For the Los Angeles Rams' final regular season game against the San Francisco 49ers on December 30, 2018
- For the Los Angeles Rams' playoff game against the Dallas Cowboys on January 12, 2019
- For the Rams' final game in the Coliseum vs. the Arizona Cardinals on December 29, 2019
- To honor Kobe Bryant after his death on January 26, 2020
- To honor Rafer Johnson (who lit the cauldron when LA hosted the games in 1984) after his death on December 2, 2020
- To honor former L.A. Councilman Tom LaBonge, known to many as "Mr. Los Angeles" after his death on January 14, 2021
- To honor Dodgers Legend Tommy Lasorda after his death on January 14, 2021
- For the Kanye West and Drake Larry Hoover Benefit Concert on December 9, 2021
- For the 2022 NASCAR Busch Light Clash at the Coliseum on February 6, 2022. The Cauldron was ceremoniously lit by 4 time NASCAR Champion Jeff Gordon
- After the death of Mexican singer Vicente Fernandez on February 17, 2022. The artist had performed at the LA Memorial Sports Arena various times
- For the 2023 NASCAR Busch Light Clash at the Coliseum, the Cauldron was lit by 2022 Heisman Trophy winner Caleb Williams
- Since May 1, 2023 the Cauldron has been ceremoniously lit the first of each month to commemorate the centennial of the venue's lasting legacy and influence on Los Angeles and the world
- On November 1, 2024, during the Los Angeles Dodgers Victory parade to commemorate the Dodgers eighth World Series Championship

== In popular culture ==
=== Television ===
- 2024: In the handoff from Paris to Los Angeles, the Coliseum is featured in the 2024 Olympics closing ceremony video, with Olympic mountain biker Kate Courtney pedaling the flag to the Coliseum, handing off to famed sprinter Michael Johnson who ran it to skateboarder Jagger Eaton on the beach.

=== Video games ===
- 1996: Microsoft Flight Simulator for Windows 95 included a challenge to fly through the needle of the Coliseum and land on the field

== See also ==
- BMO Stadium
- List of NCAA Division I FBS football stadiums
- History of the National Football League in Los Angeles
- Lists of stadiums

People

- A.J. Barnes, active in fight against giving USC preferential rights in the Coliseum, 1932
- Lloyd G. Davies, Los Angeles City Council member, 1943–51, urged that the city take over full management of the Coliseum
- Harold A. Henry, Los Angeles City Council president and later a member of the Coliseum Commission
- Rosalind Wiener Wyman, first representative of the Los Angeles City Council on the Coliseum Commission, 1958
- Ransom M. Callicott, Los Angeles City Council, commission member, 1962

Events and tenants
| Preceded by Olympisch Stadion; Amsterdam | Summer Olympics; Opening and closing ceremonies venue (Olympic Stadium); 1932 | Succeeded by Olympiastadion; Berlin |
| Preceded by Olympisch Stadion; Amsterdam | Summer Olympics; Athletics competitions Main venue 1932 | Succeeded by Olympiastadion; Berlin |
| Preceded by Central Lenin Stadium; Moscow | Summer Olympics; Opening and closing ceremonies venue (Olympic Stadium); 1984 | Succeeded by Seoul Olympic Stadium; Seoul |
| Preceded by Central Lenin Stadium; Moscow | Summer Olympics; Athletics competitions Main venue 1984 | Succeeded by Seoul Olympic Stadium; Seoul |
| Preceded by River Seine (opening ceremony); Jardins du Trocadéro (closing ceremony); Paris | Summer Olympics; Cultural opening and formal closing ceremonies venue (Olympic Stadium); 2028 | Succeeded by Brisbane Olympic Stadium; Brisbane |
| Preceded by First stadium | CONCACAF Gold Cup; Final venue 1991 | Succeeded by Estadio Azteca; Mexico City |
| Preceded by Estadio Azteca; Mexico City | CONCACAF Gold Cup; Final venue 1996, 1998, 2000 | Succeeded by Rose Bowl; Pasadena |
| Preceded by Metropolitan Stadium; Texas Stadium | Host of NFC Championship Game; 1976; 1979 | Succeeded by Metropolitan Stadium; Tampa Stadium |
| Preceded by Miami Orange Bowl | Host of AFC Championship Game; 1984 | Succeeded by Miami Orange Bowl |
| Preceded by None; Tulane Stadium | Host of the Super Bowl; I 1967; VII 1973 | Succeeded by Miami Orange Bowl; Rice Stadium |
| Preceded by Forbes Field | Host of the MLB All-Star Game; 1959 2nd game | Succeeded by Municipal Stadium |
| Preceded by None; Tampa Stadium | Host of the NFL Pro Bowl; 1950–1972; 1979 | Succeeded by Texas Stadium; Aloha Stadium |
| Preceded by Bovard Field | Home of the USC Trojans football 1923–present | Succeeded by Current stadium |
| Preceded by Moore Field (Vermont Avenue Campus) | Home of the UCLA Bruins football 1928–1981 | Succeeded by Rose Bowl; Pasadena |
| Preceded by League Park; Edward Jones Dome | Home of the Los Angeles Rams; 1946–1979; 2016–2019 | Succeeded by Anaheim Stadium; SoFi Stadium |
| Preceded by Ebbets Field | Home of the Los Angeles Dodgers; 1958–1961 | Succeeded by Dodger Stadium |
| Preceded by First stadium | Home of the Los Angeles Chargers; 1960 | Succeeded by Balboa Stadium |
| Preceded by Oakland Coliseum | Home of the Los Angeles Raiders; 1982–1994 | Succeeded by Oakland Coliseum |
