= Lake Placid bids for the Winter Olympics =

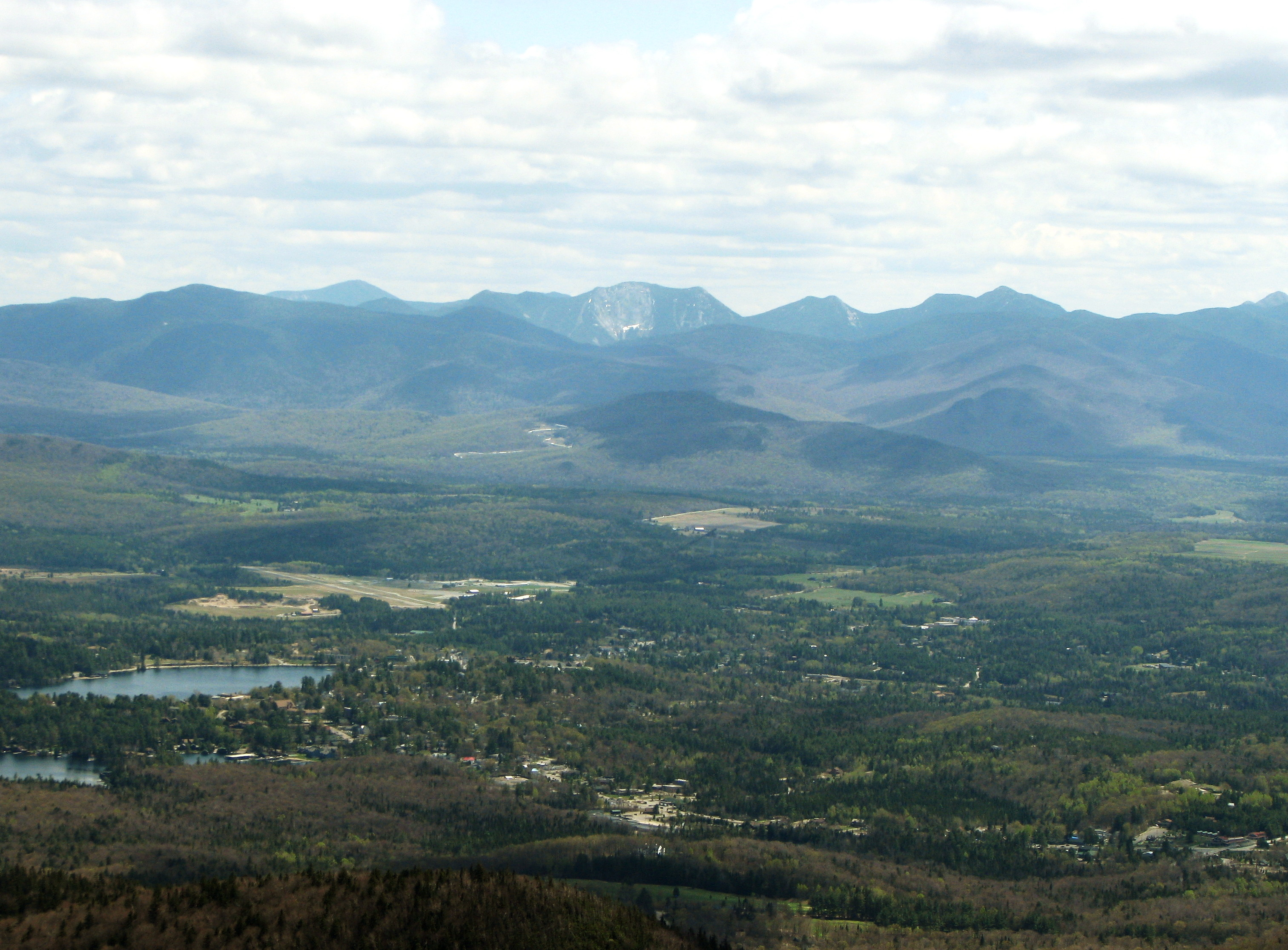
View of Lake Placid

The village of Lake Placid, New York, in the United States, has submitted seven bids to the International Olympic Committee (IOC) to host the Winter Olympic Games, and it has been awarded the Games twice, in 1932 and 1980. Lake Placid has also applied to the United States Olympic & Paralympic Committee (USOPC, formerly USOC) on six other occasions with a potential bid, only for the USOC to choose another American city as its nominee to present to the IOC.

== 1932 ==
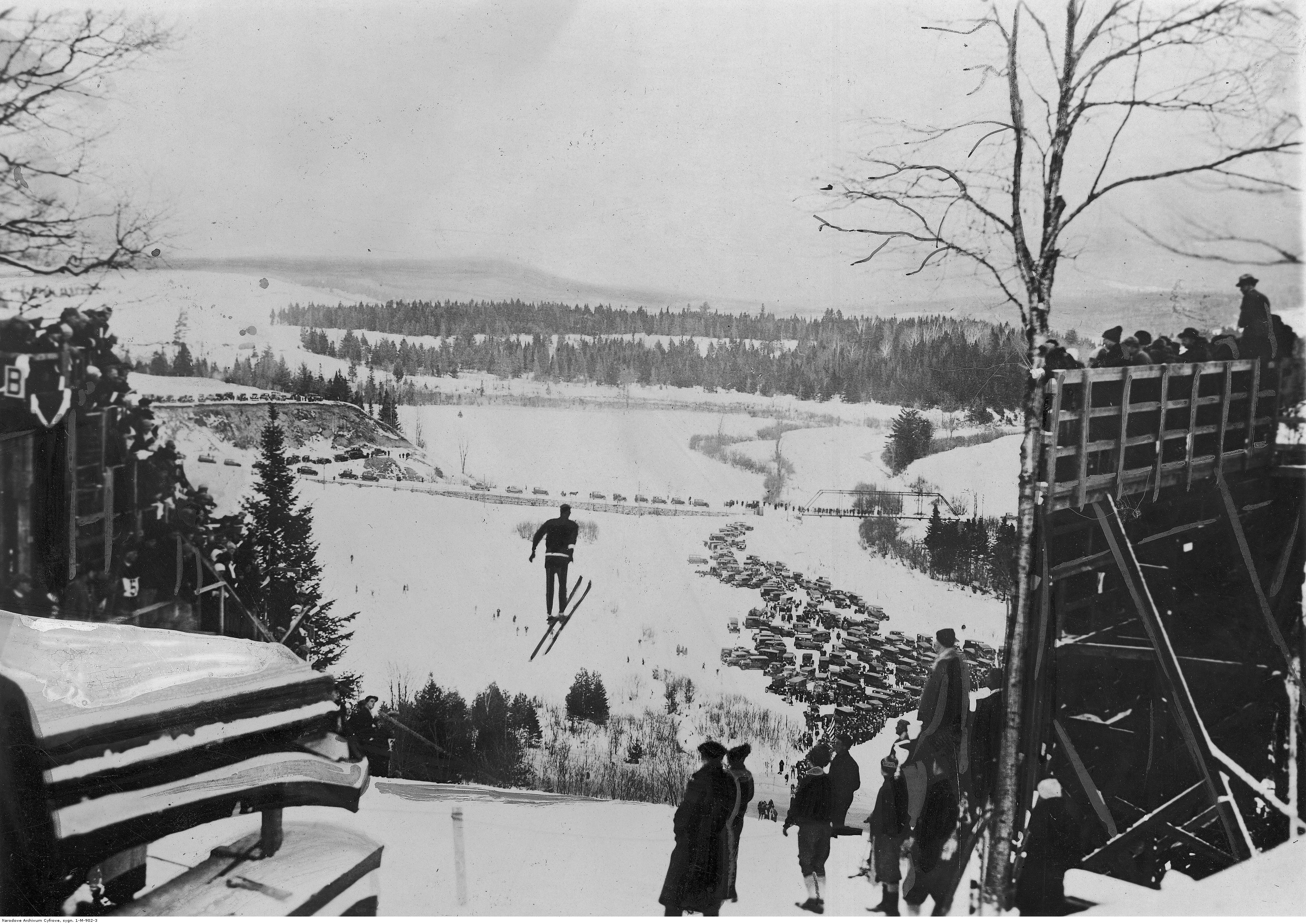
Ski jumping during the 1932 Winter Olympics.

In association with the 1924 Summer Olympics in Paris, the French Olympic Committee hosted an "International Winter Sports Week" in Chamonix in January 1924. After the success of this event, the International Olympic Committee gathered in Prague in 1925 for its 8th Olympic Congress. There, the Olympic Winter Games Charter was signed, retroactively designating the Chamonix event as the first Winter Olympic Games and providing for such events to take place every four years alongside the Summer Olympics. It was also agreed in Prague that, whenever possible, the Winter Olympics should be hosted by the same country as the Summer Olympics of the same year.

Los Angeles had previously been awarded the 1932 Summer Olympics in 1923. It was therefore expected that the 1932 Winter Olympics would also be held in the United States. The USOC approached Lake Placid in late 1927 as a potential host for the event, because the Lake Placid Club was the oldest operating year-round ski resort in the country and an established winter attraction for New Yorkers. However, many local leaders believed that the area was not on par with the premier ski resorts of Europe. Winter sports were little known in America at the time; Sports Illustrated magazine later remarked that, while Lake Placid was then arguably the "winter sports capital of the U.S.", "in those days any place that put on one or more ice-and-snow events was automatically the winter-sports capital of the U.S."

Godfrey Dewey, the vice president of the Lake Placid Club, took an interest in bidding for the Olympics. He had previously been described by the Lake Placid News as "an acknowledged authority on all matters pertaining to winter sports" and had recently overseen the construction of the village's first 60-meter ski jump. The secretary of the Lake Placid Club, Harry Wade Hicks, was also the president of the United States Eastern Amateur Ski Association at the time. Early in 1928, Hicks became president of the National Ski Association, and shortly after taking the post, he discovered that no American skiers were expected to be sent to the 1928 Winter Olympics in St. Moritz, Switzerland. Hicks quickly raised money to send three skiers to St. Moritz and appointed Godfrey Dewey as their manager.

While visiting Europe for the Olympics, Dewey wanted to further investigate what Lake Placid would need to host a future Winter Olympics, so he studied the facilities in St. Moritz and extended his trip to visit Chamonix and other prominent Alpine winter resorts in France and Switzerland. The European tour convinced Dewey that Lake Placid had the climate and terrain necessary to stage the Winter Olympics in 1932. Upon his return, he addressed the Lake Placid Kiwanis Club on March 21, 1928. There, he told the village that the only thing Lake Placid lacked was the accommodations necessary to house thousands of athletes, attendees, and spectators, and recommended that the community begin construction on such housing facilities at once. Two days later, he and a group of prominent businessmen and government leaders established an organizing committee to pursue the bid. Since Lake Placid was a small village, the organizers sought the support of local leaders all across the Adirondacks, and of the state of New York and Governor Franklin D. Roosevelt, in funding and building new facilities for the Olympics.

Lake Placid's candidacy was one of seven American bids submitted to the IOC. The others were from Bear Mountain in New York, Denver in Colorado, Duluth and Minneapolis in Minnesota, and Lake Tahoe and Yosemite Valley in California. Among these various bids, historian E. John B. Allen has written that the "only serious contenders were California and Lake Placid." William May Garland, a Californian member of the IOC who was leading the organization of the 1932 Summer Olympics in Los Angeles, advocated for the Winter Olympics to also be held in his state. Godfrey Dewey wrote to Garland in January 1929, saying that California had no established winter sports facilities and lacked the needed experience to host the Winter Olympics, and asked him to withdraw. Garland wrote back, "Let the best man win," and dispatched five Californians to represent the state's bid to the IOC. Several European IOC members believed that there were no winter sport venues capable of hosting the Winter Olympics in all of North America and wanted to send a special commission to investigate.

The host city for the 1932 Winter Olympics was chosen at the 27th IOC Session in Lausanne, Switzerland, on April 10, 1929. The session was originally scheduled to be held in Alexandria, Egypt, but was moved to IOC headquarters at the last minute. In addition to the seven American bids, there was also a bid from Montreal, Canada, and an offer by the Norwegian government to step in as an emergency host, but these were only to be considered in the event that all American bids were eliminated first. Lake Placid was unanimously chosen by the IOC. William F. Humphrey of the California Olympic Games Committee declared the decision "an outrage" and threatened to organize a competing winter sports event somewhere in California.

== 1948 ==
The Olympics were cancelled during World War II, but after the war ended, the IOC quickly began preparations for the 1948 Winter Olympics as well as their summer counterpart. On August 29, 1945, two weeks after the surrender of Japan, while IOC delegates were meeting in London, Lake Placid telegraphed American delegate Avery Brundage to offer its candidacy for the Winter Games. The only other bid came from St. Moritz, Switzerland, which had hosted the Winter Olympics in 1928. The IOC preferred Switzerland over the United States as a host because it had been neutral in World War II, although the defeated Axis powers were excluded from the 1948 Winter Olympics. St. Moritz was unanimously selected over Lake Placid in September 1946.

== 1952 ==
Lake Placid quickly renewed its bid for the 1952 Winter Olympics. In connection with the Detroit bid for the 1952 Summer Olympics, another winter bid was promoted by the Upper Peninsula Winter Sports Committee, based in Escanaba, Michigan.

Neither Lake Placid nor Escanaba sent delegates to the 40th IOC Session in Stockholm, where the decision was to be made on June 21, 1947. Both cities instead asked Avery Brundage to present their bids at the meeting. Brundage acknowledged only the Lake Placid bid, saying that IOC members would be familiar with the town because it had hosted in 1932. Lake Placid was the only American city that appeared on the IOC ballot, alongside Oslo, Norway, and Cortina d'Ampezzo, Italy. Lake Placid received only one vote, while Oslo was chosen on the first ballot.

== 1956 ==
At the same IOC session where Oslo was chosen over Lake Placid for the 1952 Winter Olympics, five American cities unsuccessfully bid for the 1952 Summer Olympics, none of them receiving more than five votes. To prevent this from happening again, the USOC announced for the first time in July 1947 that it would nominate one city to put forward the American bid for each of the 1956 Games, Summer and Winter. In a meeting in Chicago on July 10, 1948, the USOC endorsed Lake Placid as its preferred candidate for the 1956 Winter Olympics, without any apparent competition from other cities.

The host city for the 1956 Winter Olympics was selected at the 43rd IOC Session in Rome on April 28, 1949. Despite the USOC's endorsement of Lake Placid, Colorado governor William Lee Knous sent a telegram to Avery Brundage on April 22, inviting the IOC to consider a joint bid by Aspen and Colorado Springs. This last-minute bid was accepted. On the first and only ballot, Lake Placid received one vote and came in last place, while Colorado Springs received two votes and Montreal seven. Cortina d'Ampezzo received 31 of the 41 votes cast and was chosen as the host.

== 1960 ==
The USOC believed that all of the American bids for 1956 had failed because support was split between them. As a result, it created a special committee to select one American candidate for the 1960 Winter Olympics. Lake Placid was one of three cities to apply for the USOC's nomination, alongside Sun Valley, Idaho, and a renewed joint Aspen–Colorado Springs bid. The USOC selection jury intended to nominate one of these three cities as the American candidate city at its meeting on November 17, 1954, in Chicago, but the decision was delayed. By the time the committee next met, on January 8, 1955, in New York City, two additional cities had prepared bid presentations: Reno, Nevada, and Lake Tahoe–Squaw Valley (now Olympic Valley), California. Shortly before the meeting, the California State Senate agreed to appropriate $1 million (equivalent to $12 million in 2025) to fund the event if it was held in the state. Squaw Valley received the committee's nomination, and it ultimately would become the host of the 1960 Winter Olympics.

== 1968 ==
The Lake Placid Winter Sports Council began preparing a bid for the 1968 Winter Olympics on August 8, 1962, ahead of the USOC's application deadline on September 15. The only other candidate applying to the USOC was Salt Lake City, Utah. On October 16, 1962, in a meeting in Chicago, the USOC picked Lake Placid over Salt Lake City as its bid to the IOC.

The host city for the 1968 Winter Olympics was selected at the 61st IOC Session in Innsbruck, Austria, on January 28, 1964 (immediately before the 1964 Winter Olympics opened there). On the first ballot, Lake Placid received three of the available 48 votes and came in fifth place out of the six candidate cities. Lake Placid was eliminated from contention after the first ballot and the Games were ultimately awarded to Grenoble, France.

== 1972 ==
After losing its bid for the 1968 Games, Lake Placid continued to pursue a candidacy for the 1972 Winter Olympics. The city initially faced competition from Salt Lake City and a bid from the state of Colorado. All three sought the influential endorsement of the U.S. Ski Association (USSA) at its annual convention in Spokane, Washington, in June 1965. At the convention, the Colorado Olympic Commission announced that it would not bid for 1972 and was endorsing Salt Lake City, on the condition that Utah officials would endorse Colorado in a potential future bid for the 1976 Winter Olympics. Lake Placid, meanwhile, told the USSA that it would make its presentation later, possibly at the group's 1966 convention. As a result, the USSA endorsed Salt Lake City's bid.

Late in 1965, it became known that the IOC was planning to award hosting duties for both 1972's Summer and Winter games at its 64th Session in Rome in April 1966, earlier than previous Winter Olympic hosting decisions had been made. Furthermore, the IOC set a deadline of December 15, 1965, for all candidate cities to submit their applications. This deadline was pushed back to December 31 and later to January 20, 1966, but it forced the USOC to accelerate its process for choosing the U.S. candidate city. The USOC thus informed interested cities on December 1, 1965, that they would need to prepare their formal bids in time for a committee meeting in Chicago the following month.

At the Chicago meeting on January 16, 1966, the USOC voted by a wide margin to select Salt Lake City as the U.S. candidate, with the city receiving 36 of the 42 available votes. Lake Placid received the other six, while a short-lived bid from Anchorage, Alaska had none. Salt Lake City's bid was ultimately defeated at the Rome session, with Sapporo, Japan, being chosen as the host city by the IOC.

== 1976 ==
On February 26, 1967, the USOC announced that Lake Placid was one of six cities from which it had received proposals to host the 1976 Winter Olympics, alongside Salt Lake City; Denver, Colorado; Seattle, Washington; Waterbury, Vermont; and the Sugarloaf Mountain ski area in Franklin County, Maine. The two New England bids were withdrawn later that year, and the USOC heard presentations from the remaining four cities in a meeting in New York City on December 17, 1967. In the subsequent voting, Seattle came in last place and was removed after the first ballot, while Salt Lake City was removed after reportedly receiving only nine votes on the second ballot. The final vote was between Denver and Lake Placid, Denver winning with 26 votes to Lake Placid's 17.

Denver won its bid to host the 1976 Winter Olympics at the 70th IOC Session in Amsterdam on May 12, 1970. However, the city's preparations for the Games faced financial difficulties. At one point, Denver organizers considered moving the bobsled events to Lake Placid's Mount Van Hoevenberg rather than building a new bobsled run. On November 7, 1972, a referendum to fund some of the Olympics' costs with taxpayer money was rejected by Denver voters. On November 15, Denver officially withdrew from hosting duties, becoming the first city to do so.

In the weeks leading up to the Denver referendum, officials in Lake Placid began to prepare for the village to bid again to the IOC, in the event that Denver stepped down. Organizers hoped that the $15.5 million in federal funding that had been pledged to Denver (equivalent to $119 million in 2025), which was insufficient to cover that city's costs, would be redirected to Lake Placid. Lake Placid mayor Robert J. Peacock wrote to the IOC and the USOC on November 10, before Denver had officially withdrawn, to bid for the Games.

At a December 4 meeting of the town board of North Elba, which contains the village of Lake Placid, the board members announced that they would allow the meeting's 350 attendees to decide whether the town should pursue the Olympic bid. The residents approved the measure, with about 70 percent of attendees voting in favor, and the town appropriated $20,000 in funding for the bid (equivalent to $150,000 in 2025). Some residents who opposed bringing the Olympics to Lake Placid nevertheless voted in favor of the bid, hopeful that an unsuccessful Olympic bid would bring more tourism revenue to the area.

Lake Placid was one of four places to bid for the USOC's endorsement as a replacement host, alongside Salt Lake City, South Lake Tahoe, and a Reno–North Lake Tahoe bid which included Squaw Valley, California, host of the 1960 Winter Olympics. In a meeting on January 4, 1973, in New York City, the USOC unanimously chose Salt Lake City as its replacement nominee. Lake Placid organizers protested the decision, with spokesman Roy Kennedy claiming that "they want the games to go by default to Europe" and arguing that Salt Lake City was unsuitable as a host because of its high elevation. Kennedy said that Lake Placid would consider taking its bid directly to the IOC without the endorsement of the USOC.

The IOC organized an extraordinary session at its headquarters in Lausanne, Switzerland, on February 4, 1973, to choose a new host for the Games. Salt Lake City's bid was dependent on financial assistance from the federal government. When federal officials could not guarantee funding, the city withdrew its bid on January 30, five days before the IOC vote. The next day, the USOC nominated Lake Placid as its candidate city. While the IOC had set a deadline of January 15 for all candidate cities to submit their bids, Lake Placid's candidacy was accepted.

Lake Placid was one of four candidate cities represented at the emergency session, alongside Innsbruck, Austria (host of the 1964 Winter Olympics), Chamonix, France (host of the first Winter Olympics in 1924), and Tampere, Finland. Although Lake Placid had only four days to prepare, the village's presentation was received well. While some IOC members were skeptical about awarding the Games to an American city after both Denver and Salt Lake City had abruptly pulled out of their commitments, IOC president Michael Morris, 3rd Baron Killanin, blocked the other committee members from questioning Lake Placid on that basis. The 1976 Winter Olympics were ultimately awarded to Innsbruck, as its facilities from 1964 were still in good condition and expenses in hosting the Games again there would be minimal. While the exact vote totals were not publicly disclosed, Lake Placid reportedly came in second place, with one committee member saying that the village should have been the American nominee in the first place instead of Denver.

== 1980 ==
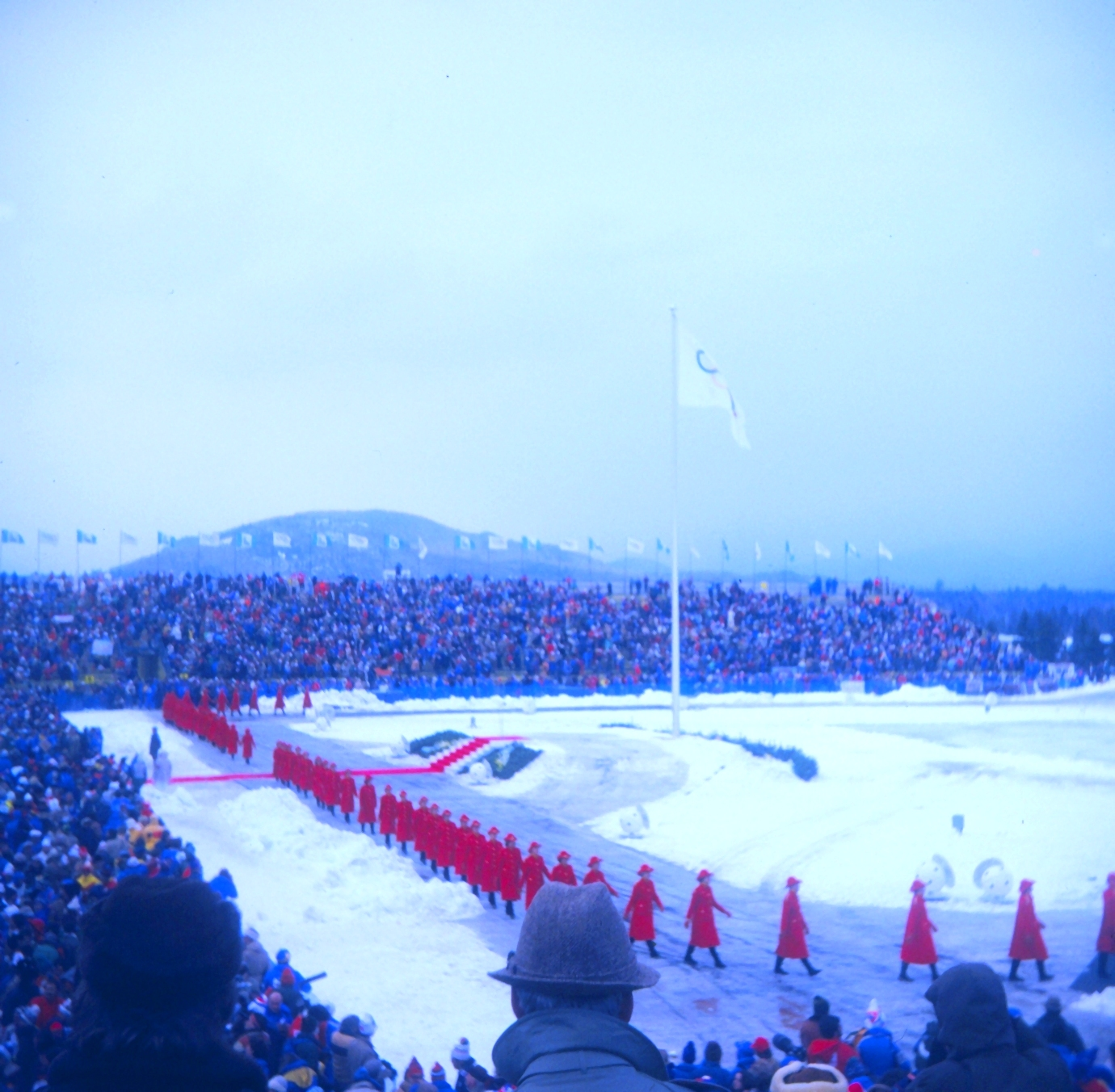
Opening Ceremony of the 1980 Winter Olympics

Immediately after losing its second bid for the 1976 Winter Olympics, spokesman Roy Kennedy said that Lake Placid would begin preparing to bid for the next Winter Games in 1980. A referendum was held in North Elba on October 16, 1973, to decide whether the town should spend another $20,000 to bid again. Voters approved the measure, 726 votes to 576. This was intended to show that Lake Placid would not withdraw from hosting duties after being awarded them as Denver had.

Lake Placid was the only American candidate seeking the USOC's endorsement for the 1980 Winter Olympics. On November 18, 1973, in a meeting in New York City, the USOC announced that Lake Placid had been tentatively selected as the nominee, alongside Los Angeles for the 1980 Summer Olympics. With no other bids, the tentative selection was finalized by the USOC on February 22, 1974. At that time, Mayor Peacock estimated that hosting the Olympics would cost $25 million (equivalent to $163 million in 2025), about one-third of which would be sought from the state government of New York.

Three other cities submitted bids to host the 1980 Winter Olympics: Vancouver–Garibaldi, Canada; Lahti, Finland; and Chamonix, France. Lahti and Chamonix withdrew their bids early in the process. Vancouver's bid was rejected by the British Columbia provincial government on August 2, 1974, two months before the IOC was set to choose a host. This left Lake Placid as the presumptive host, since no other candidates remained.

The host cities for the 1980 Summer and Winter Olympics were selected at the 75th IOC Session in Vienna, Austria, on October 13, 1974. Since there were no other candidates for the Winter Olympics, Lake Placid was unanimously approved as the host. This also affected the outcome of the Summer Olympics host vote, as the only two candidates there were Moscow and Los Angeles. While many IOC members had misgivings about awarding an Olympics to the Soviet Union, the committee wanted to avoid giving both Games to the United States, so Moscow was chosen as the host of the 1980 Summer Olympics.

== 1992 ==
In March 1980, days after the closing ceremony of the Winter Olympics in Lake Placid, the local Chamber of Commerce asked the Lake Placid Olympic Organizing Committee to pursue a bid for the 1992 Winter Olympics. While members of the LPOOC applauded upon hearing the request, no immediate action was taken. This campaign was initially hampered by the aftermath of the 1980 Winter Olympics, which had left the LPOOC with $7 million of debt (equivalent to $54 million in 2025). New York Daily News columnist Dick Young wrote that Lake Placid deserved the "Chutzpah Award of [the] Year [...] for even thinking of applying". The state government of New York assumed the LPOOC's remaining debts in 1981 and established the Olympic Regional Development Authority (ORDA), a public benefit corporation responsible for managing the venues that had been built for the Olympics.

By the end of 1982, local organizers had established the 2000 Club, which advocated for Lake Placid to host the Winter Olympics again in the year 2000. ORDA president Ned Harkness agreed with the club's goal, but said in 1983, "Why wait until 2000? We could have the Olympics here again in 1992."

Harkness later sent other members of the ORDA to attend a meeting of the 2000 Club to further discuss the goal of hosting another Olympics. Shortly after, on October 16, 1984, ORDA members unanimously voted to ask Governor Mario Cuomo to designate ORDA as the agency responsible for a future Lake Placid bid. In the same meeting, they also agreed to investigate the possibility of bidding for the 1992 Winter Olympics. On March 12, 1985, Harkness announced that Lake Placid would bid for 1992, sending a letter of intent to the USOC.

After the 1988 Winter Olympics were awarded to Calgary in nearby Canada in 1981, the USOC considered it unlikely that the next event would also be held in North America. However, it was thought that bidding for 1992 would give the U.S. candidate city extra time to prepare for a more serious bid to host the next Winter Olympics, which were then expected to occur in 1996. As a result, Lake Placid was one of five cities to apply to the USOC for its nomination before the deadline on April 10, 1985, alongside Anchorage, Alaska; Portland, Oregon; Reno–Lake Tahoe; and Salt Lake City. Portland dropped out of contention in May, intending to focus on a bid for 1996.

The four candidate cities made presentations to the Executive Board of the USOC during its annual meeting in Indianapolis, Indiana, on June 15, 1985. While the exact results of the Board's vote that afternoon were not disclosed, Anchorage was selected quickly, reportedly on the first ballot. Anchorage's bid to the IOC ultimately lost to that of Albertville, France, in October 1986.

== 1994 ==
During the same IOC meeting where the host of the 1992 Winter Olympics was chosen in October 1986, it was decided that future Winter Olympics would be held in alternate even years from the Summer Olympics, meaning that the Winter Olympics after 1992 would be held in 1994, not 1996 as previously expected. Lake Placid expressed an interest in hosting the 1994 Winter Olympics, as did Anchorage, Denver, Portland, Reno, and Salt Lake City. However, at the next meeting of the USOC's executive board, held on November 23, 1986, in Sparks, Nevada, USOC president Robert Helmick argued that Anchorage should be nominated again without further consideration, since the change in schedule meant there was limited time to prepare a new bid and Anchorage already had the presentation materials it had just used. Despite protests from organizers for the other bids, the executive board agreed in a 44–14 vote to renominate Anchorage immediately rather than allow other cities to present their bids for consideration. Anchorage's bid was defeated again in the final IOC vote in September 1988, this time by Lillehammer, Norway.

== 1998 ==
In November 1988, the USOC created new rules for candidate host cities, requiring all candidates to begin construction on sports facilities before being selected as host city. This was done to ensure that, whether the city won the games or not, the U.S. would gain state-of-the-art training facilities for winter sports with less popularity. ORDA president Ned Harkness announced on February 16, 1989, that Lake Placid would bid for the 1998 Winter Olympics, expressing confidence that the village's facilities were already "among the best in the world".

However, the USOC's rule was intended to encourage the construction of new facilities, preferably in a centrally-located city in the western United States. USOC president Robert Helmick later admitted that new training facilities were "a desperate, critical need" and "more critical than getting the Games for this country."

On March 31, Harkness and Lake Placid mayor Robert Peacock announced that they were withdrawing the village's bid. Their joint statement said it was "obvious" that the USOC wanted to use the bidding process to encourage winter sports development in the western U.S., and offered that if "there is a need for Lake Placid to step forward to help return the Olympic Games to the United States, please be aware that we are ready and willing." Salt Lake City was chosen as the USOC's nominee in June 1989, losing to Nagano, Japan, in the IOC vote in June 1991. In June 1995, Salt Lake City was awarded the 2002 Winter Olympics.

== 21st century ==
Since withdrawing its bid for the 1998 Winter Olympics, Lake Placid organizers have occasionally proposed, but not seriously pursued, plans to host the Winter Olympics again. In June 2000, the Adirondack Sports Commission and the Greater Montreal Tourism and Convention Bureau proposed a joint bid for the 2014 Winter Olympics shared by Lake Placid and the Canadian city of Montreal (which had previously hosted the 1976 Summer Olympics). In 2006, Lake Placid expressed interest in bidding for the 2018 Winter Olympics, but the USOC ultimately decided not to nominate a candidate city for those Games, instead focusing its attention on the Chicago bid for the 2016 Summer Olympics. In 2015, Lake Placid proposed a joint bid for the 2026 Winter Olympics with Quebec City, Canada (which had previously unsuccessfully bid for the 2002 Winter Games), but received no support from either the USOC or the Canadian Olympic Committee in this effort.

In March 2026, the state of New York started exploring the possibility of a joint New York City-Lake Placid bid for a future edition of the Winter Olympics. Lake Placid previously hosted the 1932 and 1980 Winter Olympics. New York City placed a bid for the 2012 Summer Olympics, but lost to London.

== Venues ==
Event	Venues used, 1932	1952 bid, 1947	1956 bid, 1949	1968 bid, 1962	1980 bid, 1974	Venues used, 1980
Alpine skiing	—	Whiteface Mountain				
Biathlon	—				Lake Placid Olympic Sports Complex Cross Country Biathlon Center	
Bobsleigh	Mt. Van Hoevenberg Olympic Bobsled Run					
Cross-country skiing	Clifford Falls Route (50 km), Mount Whitney Route (18 km)				Lake Placid Olympic Sports Complex Cross Country Biathlon Center	
Figure skating	Jack Shea Arena					Shea Arena and Herb Brooks Arena
Ice hockey	Olympic Stadium (preliminaries); Shea Arena (finals)	Shea Arena or Olympic Stadium		Shea Arena and Olympic Field House	Shea Arena	Shea Arena and Herb Brooks Arena
Luge	—				Mt. Van Hoevenberg Olympic Bobsled Run	
Ski jumping	MacKenzie Intervale Ski Jumping Complex			Grand View Hill	MacKenzie Intervale Ski Jumping Complex	
Speed skating	Olympic Stadium			New Olympic Complex	Olympic Stadium	
Opening ceremony	Olympic Stadium	—		Olympic Field House	—	Lake Placid Equestrian Stadium

== See also ==
- United States bids for the Olympic Games
- Los Angeles bids for the Summer Olympics
- Detroit bids for the Summer Olympics
- Salt Lake City bids for the Winter Olympics
- Anchorage bids for the Winter Olympics
- Sports in New York
