= Olympic Stadium =

Opening ceremonies venue for the Olympic Games

Olympic Stadium is the name usually given to the main stadium of an Olympic Games. An Olympic stadium is the site of the opening and closing ceremonies. Many, though not all, of these venues actually contain the words Olympic Stadium as part of their names, such as stadiums in Amsterdam, Berlin, Helsinki, Montreal, and Paris. Olympic Stadium may also be named a multi-purpose stadium which hosts Olympic sports.

In the case of the Summer Olympic Games, athletics competitions and the football final are traditionally held in the Olympic Stadium. Exceptions to this have occurred though at the 1900, 1996, 2012, 2016, and 2024 Summer Olympics as well as at the 2010 and 2018 Summer Youth Olympic Games.

Early Winter Olympic Games often used figure skating venues as focal points. These were often designated as the Olympic Stadium, usually hosting the opening and closing ceremonies.

A number of stadiums have been used in more than one Olympics in cities that have held the Games more than once. For instance, Lysgårdsbakken was the main stadium of a Winter Olympics and a Winter Youth Olympic Games (YOG). Bergiselschanze was the main stadium of two Winter Olympics and one Winter YOG. Olympiahalle jointly shared the Olympic Stadium role with Bergiselschanze during the two Winter Olympics, but not during the Winter YOG.

Only one stadium, the Los Angeles Memorial Coliseum, has been the main stadium of two Summer Olympics, and it is going to be the main stadium a record third time in the 2028 Games. In addition to the inaugural Summer Olympics, the Panathinaiko Stadio was also the main stadium of the only Intercalated Games held. The National Stadium in Tokyo was the main stadium that hosted the 1964 Summer Olympics (the first in Asia), but the 2020 Games was hosted in a new stadium on the same site. Beijing National Stadium was the main stadium of two Olympics, but with a special distinction: it was the only stadium to have been such at both a Summer and a Winter Olympics opening and closing ceremonies.

A number of stadiums have hosted events at subsequent Olympics. In the 2004 Athens Games, the Panathinaiko Stadio hosted the archery competition and was the finish of both women's and men's marathon events. The Vélodrome de Vincennes, the main stadium of the 1900 Summer Olympics, was the track cycling venue of the 1924 Paris Games. Similarly, the Stade Yves-du-Manoir, the 1924 Games main stadium, was used for the field hockey tournaments at the 2024 Summer Olympics. The London Games of 2012 were not opened and closed at the rebuilt Wembley Stadium, the site of the 1948 Olympic Stadium, but instead at a new stadium in Stratford. Wembley was, however, the venue for some 2012 Olympic football matches, including both men's and women's finals. Likewise, the Melbourne Cricket Ground, which was the centrepiece stadium for the 1956 games, later hosted the first games of the Sydney 2000 football tournament. Lake Placid's 1932 Olympic Stadium was utilized in the 1980 Lake Placid games as the speed skating venue. Olympiahalle hosted figure skating and short-track speed skating during the 2012 Winter Youth Olympics. Stockholm Olympic Stadium hosted equestrian events for the 1956 Summer Olympics (while the 1956 Games were held in Melbourne, Australia, quarantine restrictions prevented equestrian events from being held domestically, thus Stockholm, Sweden hosted the 2029 equestrian competitions).

== Stadiums ==
Image	Olympics	Season	Stadium	Native name	City	Country	New/old	Capacity	Existing?
	1896	Summer	Panathenaic Stadium	Παναθηναϊκό στάδιο	Athens	Greece	Existing	80,000	Yes
	1900	Summer	Vincennes Velodrome (ceremony)	Vélodrome de Vincennes	Paris	France	Existing	50,000	Yes
	1900	Summer	Croix-Catelan Stadium (athletics)	Stade Croix-Catelan	Paris	France	Existing		No
	1904	Summer	Francis Field		St. Louis	United States	New	19,000	Yes
	1906 Intercalated	Summer	Panathenaic Stadium	Παναθηναϊκό στάδιο	Athens	Greece	Existing	80,000	Yes
	1908	Summer	White City Stadium		London	United Kingdom	New	68,000	No
	1912	Summer	Olympic Stadium	Stockholms Olympiastadion	Stockholm	Sweden	New	20,000	Yes
	1920	Summer	Olympic Stadium	Olympisch Stadion	Antwerp	Belgium	New	12,771	Yes
	1924	Winter	Olympic Stadium	Stade Olympique de Chamonix	Chamonix	France	New	45,000	Yes
	1924	Summer	Olympic Stadium	Stade Olympique Yves-du-Manoir	Paris	France	Existing	45,000	Yes
	1928	Winter	St. Moritz Olympic Ice Rink	Badrutts Park	St. Moritz	Switzerland	New	4,000	Yes
	1928	Summer	Olympic Stadium	Olympisch Stadion	Amsterdam	Netherlands	Existing, renovated	31,600	Yes
	1932	Winter	Lake Placid Speedskating Oval		Lake Placid	United States	New	7,500	Yes
	1932	Summer	Los Angeles Memorial Coliseum		Los Angeles	United States	Existing, expanded	101,574	Yes
	1936	Winter	Olympia Skistadion		Garmisch-Partenkirchen	Germany	Existing	40,000	Yes
	1936	Summer	Olympic Stadium	Olympiastadion	Berlin	Germany	New	110,000	Yes
	1948	Winter	St. Moritz Olympic Ice Rink	Badrutts Park	St. Moritz	Switzerland	Existing	4,000	Yes
	1948	Summer	Wembley Stadium		London	United Kingdom	Existing	82,000	No (replaced)
	1952	Winter	Bislett Stadium	Bislett stadion	Oslo	Norway	Existing	20,000	No (replaced)
	1952	Summer	Olympic Stadium	Olympiastadion	Helsinki	Finland	Existing	70,470	Yes
	1956	Winter	Stadio Olimpico Del Ghiaccio		Cortina d'Ampezzo	Italy	Existing, renovated	12,000	Yes
	1956	Summer	Melbourne Cricket Ground		Melbourne	Australia	Existing	104,000	Yes
	1960	Winter	Blyth Arena		Squaw Valley	United States	New	8,500	No
	1960	Summer	Olympic Stadium	Stadio Olimpico	Rome	Italy	Existing	75,513	Yes
	1964	Winter	Bergiselschanze (opening ceremony)		Innsbruck	Austria	Existing	26,000	Yes
	1964	Winter	Olympiahalle (closing ceremony)		Innsbruck	Austria	New	10,836	Yes
	1964	Summer	National Stadium	国立競技場	Tokyo	Japan	Existing	71,556	No (replaced)
	1968	Winter	Olympic Stadium (opening ceremony)	Stade olympique	Grenoble	France	Temporary	60,000	No
	1968	Winter	Le Stade de Glace (closing ceremony)		Grenoble	France	New	12,000	Yes
	1968	Summer	Estadio Olímpico Universitario		Mexico City	Mexico	Existing	83,700	Yes
	1972	Winter	Makomanai Open Stadium (opening ceremony)	真駒内屋外競技場	Sapporo	Japan	New	30,000	Yes
	1972	Winter	Makomanai Ice Arena (closing ceremony)	真駒内屋内競技場	Sapporo	Japan	New	11,500	Yes
	1972	Summer	Olympiastadion		Munich	West Germany	New	77,000	Yes
	1976	Winter	Bergiselschanze (opening ceremony)		Innsbruck	Austria	Existing	26,000	Yes
	1976	Winter	Olympiahalle (closing ceremony)		Innsbruck	Austria	Existing	10,836	Yes
	1976	Summer	Olympic Stadium	Stade olympique	Montreal	Canada	New	72,400	Yes
	1980	Winter	Lake Placid Equestrian Stadium (opening ceremony)		Lake Placid	United States	Temporary stadium at existing equestrian grounds	30,000	No
	1980	Winter	Olympic Center Arena (closing ceremony)		Lake Placid	United States	New	10,000	Yes
	1980	Summer	Grand Arena of the Central Lenin Stadium	Большая спортивная арена центрального стадиона имени Ленина	Moscow	Soviet Union	Existing, renovated	91,251	Yes
	1984	Winter	Olympic Stadium (opening ceremony)	Olimpijski stadion	Sarajevo	Yugoslavia	Existing	50,000	Yes
	1984	Winter	Zetra Olympic Hall (closing ceremony)	Olimpijska dvorana Zetra	Sarajevo	Yugoslavia	New	12,000	Yes
	1984	Summer	Los Angeles Memorial Coliseum		Los Angeles	United States	Existing	92,516	Yes
	1988	Winter	McMahon Stadium		Calgary	Canada	Existing, renovated	38,205	Yes
	1988	Summer	Olympic Stadium	올림픽주경기장	Seoul	South Korea	Existing	69,950	Yes
	1992	Winter	Theatre of Ceremonies	Théâtre des Cérémonies	Albertville	France	Temporary	35,000	No
	1992	Summer	Olympic Stadium	Estadi Olímpic	Barcelona	Spain	Existing	60,000	Yes
	1994	Winter	Lysgårdsbakkene Ski Jumping Arena	Lysgårdsbakkene hoppanlegg	Lillehammer	Norway	New	35,000	Yes
	1996	Summer	Centennial Olympic Stadium		Atlanta	United States	New	85,000	Yes (rebuilt) (Note: Following the 1996 Summer Paralympics, Centennial Olympic Stadium was rebuilt as designed into Turner Field to serve as the home of the Atlanta Braves of Major League Baseball from 1997 until 2016, after of which, the team moved to Truist Park, outside of the Atlanta city limits. In 2017, Georgia State University acquired Turner Field, then rebuilt the stadium for a second time into Center Parc Stadium for the university's football team.)
	1998	Winter	Nagano Olympic Stadium	長野オリンピックスタジアム	Nagano	Japan	New	30,000	Yes
	2000	Summer	Stadium Australia		Sydney	Australia	New	115,600	Yes
	2002	Winter	Rice–Eccles Stadium		Salt Lake City	United States	Existing, replacement	45,017	Yes
	2004	Summer	Olympic Stadium	Ολυμπιακό Κεντρικό Στάδιο Αθήνας "Σπύρος Λούης"	Athens	Greece	Existing, renovated	72,000	Yes
	2006	Winter	Olympic Stadium	Stadio Olimpico	Turin	Italy	Existing	28,000	Yes
	2008	Summer	National Stadium	国家体育场	Beijing	China	New	91,000	Yes
	2010	Winter	BC Place		Vancouver	Canada	Existing, renovated	54,500	Yes
	2010 Youth	Summer	The Float@Marina Bay	Pentas Terapung Teluk Marina 滨海湾浮动舞台 மரீனா பே மிதக்கும் மேடை (Tamil)	Marina Bay	Singapore	Existing	30,000	No
	2012 Youth	Winter	Bergiselschanze		Innsbruck	Austria	Existing	26,000	Yes
	2012	Summer	Olympic Stadium		London	United Kingdom	New	80,000	Yes
	2014	Winter	Fisht Olympic Stadium	Олимпийский стадион	Sochi	Russia	New	40,000	Yes
	2014 Youth	Summer	Olympic Stadium	南京奥林匹克体育中心	Nanjing	China	Existing	61,443	Yes
	2016 Youth	Winter	Lysgårdsbakkene Ski Jumping Arena (opening ceremony)	Lysgårdsbakkene hoppanlegg	Lillehammer	Norway	Existing	35,000	Yes
	2016 Youth	Winter	Håkons Hall (closing ceremony)		Lillehammer	Norway	Existing	11,500	Yes
	2016	Summer	Estádio do Maracanã (ceremonies, football)		Rio de Janeiro	Brazil	Existing	74,738	Yes
	2016	Summer	Olympic Stadium (athletics and football)	Estádio Olímpico	Rio de Janeiro	Brazil	Existing, expanded	60,000	Yes
	2018	Winter	Pyeongchang Olympic Stadium	평창 올림픽 스타디움	Pyeongchang	South Korea	Temporary	35,000	No
	2018 Youth	Summer	Obelisco de Buenos Aires (opening ceremony)	Obelisco de Buenos Aires	Buenos Aires	Argentina	Existing, temporary	N/A	Yes
	2018 Youth	Summer	Buenos Aires Youth Olympic Village (closing ceremony)		Buenos Aires	Argentina	New	15,500	Yes
	2020 Youth	Winter	Vaudoise Arena	Vaudoise Aréna	Lausanne	Switzerland	New	9,600	Yes
	2020	Summer	Olympic Stadium	国立競技場 (tentative name)	Tokyo	Japan	Existing, replacement	68,000	Yes
	2022	Winter	National Stadium	国家体育场	Beijing	China	Existing	80,000	Yes
	2024 Youth	Winter	Gangneung Oval (opening ceremony, speed skating)	강릉 스피드 스케이팅 경기장	Gangwon	South Korea	Existing	8,000	Yes
	2024 Youth	Winter	Yongpyong Dome (opening ceremony)	용평돔	Gangwon	South Korea	Existing		Yes
	2024 Youth	Winter	Gangwon Olympic Stage (closing ceremony)		Gangwon	South Korea	Temporary structure next to existing venue	N/A	No
	2024	Summer	River Seine (opening ceremony)		Paris	France	Temporary	300,000	No
	2024	Summer	Jardins du Trocadéro (opening ceremony)		Paris	France	Temporary	30,000	No
	2024	Summer	Stade de France (athletics, rugby sevens, closing ceremony)		Paris	France	Existing	77,083	Yes
	2026	Winter	San Siro (opening ceremony)		Milan	Italy	Existing	75,923	Yes
	2026	Winter	Verona Arena (closing ceremony)		Verona	Italy	Existing	15,000	Yes
	2026 Youth	Summer	Abdoulaye Wade Stadium	Stade Abdoulaye Wade	Dakar	Senegal	Existing	50,000	Yes
	2028 Youth	Winter	Stelvio (opening ceremony, alpine skiing)		Bormio	Italy	Existing	5,000	Yes
	2028 Youth	Winter	Cross country and biathlon center Fabio Canal (closing ceremony)		Tesero	Italy	Existing	15,000	Yes
	2028	Summer	Los Angeles Memorial Coliseum (ceremonies, athletics)		Los Angeles	United States	Existing, renovated	60,000	Yes
	2028	Summer	SoFi Stadium (Note: Under present IOC policy, non-sponsoring corporate naming rights are disallowed on venues during the duration of the Games.) (opening ceremony, swimming)		Inglewood	United States	Existing	70,240-100,240; 38,000 (swimming)	Yes
	2030	Winter	TBA		Lyon	France	TBA	TBA	No
	2032	Summer	Olympic Stadium		Brisbane	Australia	New	63,000	Yes
	2034	Winter	Rice–Eccles Stadium		Salt Lake City	United States	Existing	53,644	Yes

== Other major events held at Olympic stadiums ==
Venue	City	Events
Olympic Stadium	(Netherlands) Amsterdam	1962 European Cup Final, 1977 European Cup Winners' Cup Final, 1981 UEFA Cup Final, 1987 Individual Speedway World Championship Finals, 1992 UEFA Cup Final, 2016 European Athletics Championships
Panathenaic Stadium	(Greece) Athens	1967–68 FIBA European Cup Winners' Cup, 2011 Special Olympics World Summer Games
Olympiako Stadio Athinas 'Spyros Louis'	(Greece) Athens	1983, 1994 and 2007 UEFA Champions League Finals, 1991 Mediterranean Games 1997 World Championships in Athletics, 2005, 2006 and 2022 WRC Acropolis Rally SuperSpecial Stage, 2006 IAAF World Cup
Centennial Olympic Stadium	(United States) Atlanta	as Turner Field: 1999 World Series, 2000 MLB All-Star Game as Center Parc Stadium: annual MEAC/SWAC Challenge, annual GHSA football championships (2019–2022)
Olympic Stadium	(Spain) Barcelona	1989 IAAF World Cup, 2003 World Police and Fire Games, 2010 European Athletics Championships
Beijing National Stadium	(China) Beijing	2009 Race of Champions, 2015 World Championships in Athletics, 2017 League of Legends World Championship, 2027 World Athletics Championships
Olympic Stadium	(Germany) Berlin	1974 and 2006 FIFA World Cups, 1994 IPC Athletics World Championships, annual IAAF Golden League (1998–2009), 2009 World Championships in Athletics, 2011 FIFA Women's World Cup, 2015 UEFA Champions League Final, 2018 European Athletics Championships, UEFA Euro 2024, annual DFB-Pokal final
McMahon Stadium	(Canada) Calgary	Six Grey Cups, 1972 and 1978 CFL All-Star Games, 1997 World Police and Fire Games
Olympic Stadium	(Finland) Helsinki	1957 Bandy World Championship, 1983 and 2005 World Championships in Athletics, 1971, 1994, and 2012 European Athletics Championships, UEFA Women's Euro 2009, 2022 UEFA Super Cup.
Bergisel Ski Jump	(Austria) Innsbruck	1968 and 2005 Winter Universiades, 1933, 1985, and 2019 FIS Nordic World Ski Championships, annual FIS Ski Jumping World Cup
Olympic Stadium	(United Kingdom) London	2015 Race of Champions, 2015 Rugby World Cup, 2017 World Para Athletics Championships, 2017 World Championships in Athletics, 2018 Athletics World Cup,
Wembley Stadium	(United Kingdom) London	Original stadium: 1963, 1968, 1971, 1978, and 1992 European Cup Finals, 1966 FIFA World Cup, 1989-1992 Rugby League World Cup, WWF SummerSlam 1992, 1995 Rugby League World Cup, UEFA Euro 1996, annual FA Cup final, League Cup final, and FA Charity Shield; Current stadium: 2007 and 2008 Race of Champions, 2011, 2013, and 2024 UEFA Champions League Finals, 2013 Rugby League World Cup, 2015 Rugby World Cup, UEFA Euro 2020, annual FA Cup final, NFL International Series, EFL Cup final, and FA Community Shield
White City Stadium	(United Kingdom) London	1934 British Empire Games, 1966 FIFA World Cup
Los Angeles Memorial Coliseum	(United States) Los Angeles	1959 World Series, second 1959 MLB All-Star Game, Super Bowl I (1967), Super Bowl VII (1973), 23 Pro Bowls, 1982 Individual Speedway World Championship, 2015 Special Olympics World Summer Games, AMA Supercross Championships (historically), annual Busch Light Clash, Mickey Thompson Off Road Grand Prix (historically)
SoFi Stadium	(United States) Los Angeles	Super Bowl LVI (2022), 2023 College Football Playoff National Championship, 2024 Copa América, 2026 FIFA World Cup, annual LA Bowl, WrestleMania 39, Monster Jam World Finals XXIII
The Float @ Marina Bay	(Singapore) Marina Bay	annual Singapore Grand Prix
Melbourne Cricket Ground	(Australia) Melbourne	1992 and 2015 Cricket World Cup Finals, 2006 Commonwealth Games, annual AFL Grand Final (except 2020 & 2021)
Estadio Olímpico Universitario	Mexico City	1955 Pan American Games, 1975 Pan American Games, 1986 FIFA World Cup
San Siro	(Italy) Milan	1934 and 1990 FIFA World Cups
Olympic Stadium	(Canada) Montreal	1979 IAAF World Cup, 1982 MLB All-Star Game, six Grey Cups, 2014 FIFA U-20 Women's World Cup, 2015 FIFA Women's World Cup
Luzhniki Stadium	(Russia) Moscow	1973 Summer Universiade, 1999 UEFA Cup Final, 2008 UEFA Champions League Final, 2013 World Championships in Athletics, 2018 FIFA World Cup
Olympic Stadium	(Germany) Munich	1974 FIFA World Cup, 1979 European Cup Final, UEFA Euro 1988, 1993 and 1997 UEFA Champions League Finals, 1989 Individual Speedway World Championship, 2002 and 2022 European Athletics Championships, 2012 UEFA Women's Champions League Final
Nanjing Olympic Sports Centre	(China) Nanjing	2005 National Games of China
Bislett Stadium	(Norway) Oslo	1946 European Athletics Championships, annual IAAF Golden League (1998–2009), annual Diamond League
Lysgårdsbakken	(Norway) Lillehammer	annual FIS Ski Jumping World Cup and FIS Nordic Combined World Cup
Vélodrome de Vincennes	(France) Paris	1968, 1969, 1970, 1971, 1972, 1973, and 1974 Tour de France closing stages
Stade Olympique de Colombes	(France) Paris	1938 FIFA World Cup
Seine	(France) Paris	annual Rouen 24 Hours of Motor Boating
Jardins du Trocadéro	(France) Paris	start of annual Tour de France Automobile, closing stages of Tour de France
Stade de France	(France) Paris	1998 FIFA World Cup, 1999 Rugby World Cup, annual IAAF Golden League (1999–2009), 2000 UEFA Champions League Final, 2003 FIFA Confederations Cup Final, 2003 World Championships in Athletics, 2006 UEFA Champions League Final, 2007 Rugby World Cup Final, UEFA Euro 2016, annual Coupe de France final, annual Top 14 final, annual Diamond League
Estádio do Maracanã	(Brazil) Rio de Janeiro	1950 and 2014 FIFA World Cups, 1989, 2019 and 2021 Copas América, 2000 FIFA Club World Championship, 2007 Pan American Games, 2013 FIFA Confederations Cup, 2027 FIFA Women's World Cup
Estádio Olímpico Nilton Santos	(Brazil) Rio de Janeiro	2007 Pan American Games, 2011 Military World Games, 2021 Copa América
Stadio Olimpico	(Italy) Rome	UEFA Euro 1968, 1980 and 2020, 1974 European Athletics Championships, 1975 Summer Universiade, 1977 and 1984 European Cup Finals, 1981 IAAF World Cup, 1987 World Championships in Athletics, 1990 FIFA World Cup, 1996 and 2009 UEFA Champions League Finals, annual IAAF Golden League (1998–2009), annual Diamond League
Rice-Eccles Olympic Stadium	(United States) Salt Lake City	annual AMA Supercross Championships, Monster Jam World Finals XXIIII
Makomanai Open Stadium	(Japan) Sapporo	1991 Winter Universiade
Olympic Stadium	(South Korea) Seoul	1986 Asian Games, 2013 EAFF East Asian Cup finals
Fisht Olympic Stadium	(Russia) Sochi	2017 FIFA Confederations Cup, 2018 FIFA World Cup
Stockholm Olympic Stadium	(Sweden) Stockholm	1958 European Athletics Championships, 1999 World Police and Fire Games, 2001, 2002 and 2004 Speedway Grand Prix of Sweden, annual Diamond League
Stadium Australia	(Australia) Sydney	2003 Rugby World Cup, 2015 AFC Asian Cup, 2023 FIFA Women's World Cup, annual NRL Grand Final
National Stadium	(Japan) Tokyo	Original stadium: 1958 Asian Games, 1967 Summer Universiade, 1991 World Championships in Athletics, annual Intercontinental Cup, 2005, 2006, 2007, and 2008 FIFA Club World Cups, 2012 FIFA U-20 Women's World Cup, annual Emperor's Cup final Current stadium: annual Emperor's Cup final, 2025 World Athletics Championships
Stadio Olimpico di Torino	(Italy) Turin	1934 European Athletics Championships, 1934 FIFA World Cup, 1959 and 1970 Summer Universiades
BC Place	(Canada) Vancouver	Nine Grey Cups, 1983 CFL All-Star Game, 1989 World Police and Fire Games, 1990 Gay Games, 2015 FIFA Women's World Cup, 2026 FIFA World Cup

‡: Future event scheduled to take place at venue.

== See also ==
- Lists of stadiums
