= Venues of the 1980 Winter Olympics =

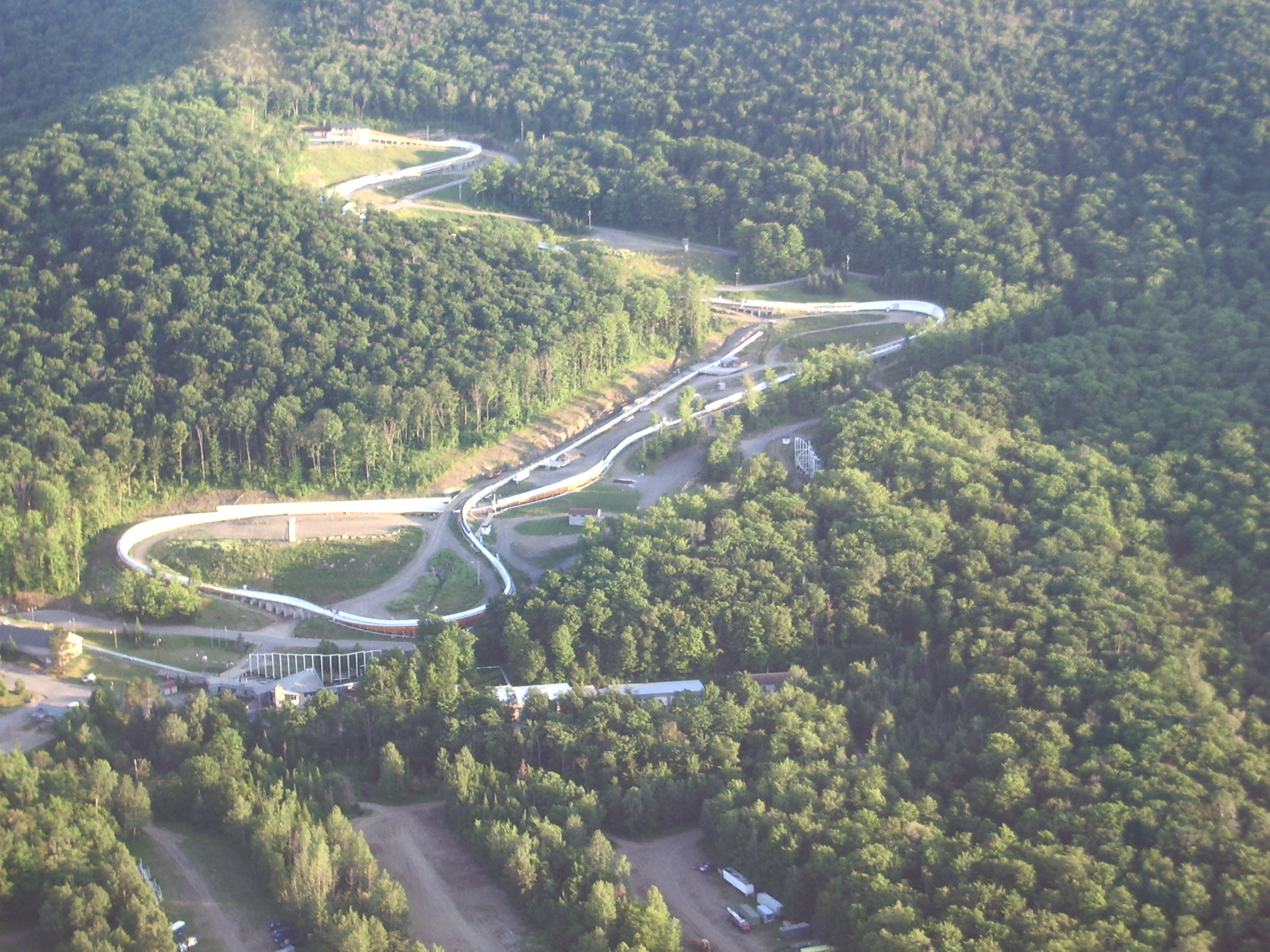
2005 aerial view of the current bobsleigh, luge, and skeleton track. At the 1980 Winter Games, this was where the luge track was located. The bobsleigh track used for the 1932 and 1980 Winter Olympics, no longer in use, is seen at the lower part of the picture.

For the 1980 Winter Olympics in Lake Placid, New York, United States, a total of seven sports venues were used. All five of the venues used for the 1932 Winter Olympics were also used at the 1980 Winter Games with adjustments. These adjustments included electronic scoreboards, increased refrigeration, and the addition of a separate luge track. This was the last Winter Olympics where there were separate bobsleigh and luge tracks. The closest finish in Olympic history in cross-country skiing led skiing officials to time future events in hundredths of a second rather than tenths of a second. This would also apply to biathlon events. Eric Heiden won five gold medals at the speed skating oval while the "Miracle on Ice" took place between Americans and Soviets at the Olympic Center. In the late 1990s, the luge track was demolished and a new combination track was constructed in time for the only Winter Goodwill Games held. The sliding venue was named to the American National Register of Historical Places in February 2010.

== Venues ==
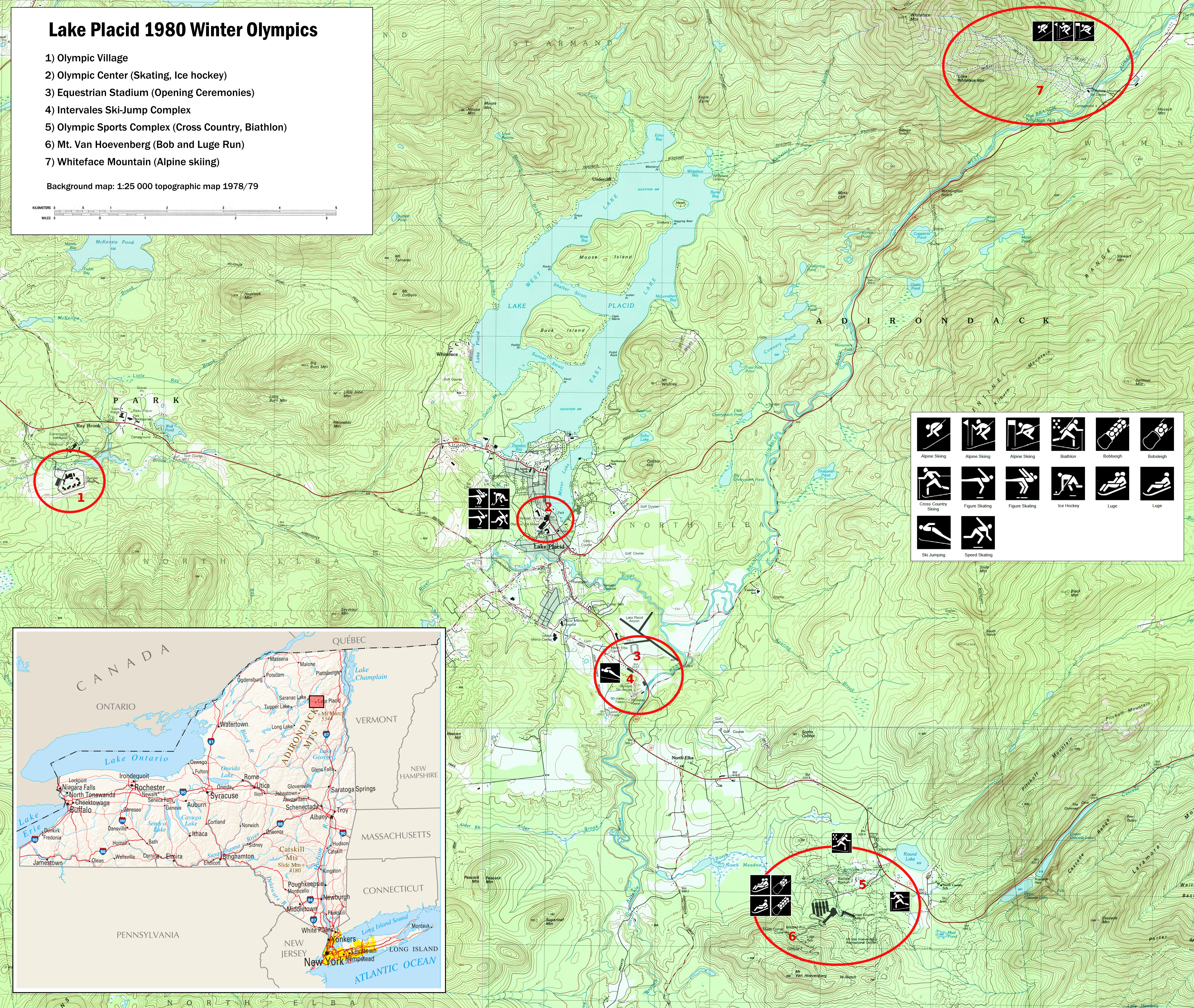
Map of the venues in Lake Placid

Venue	Sports	Capacity	Ref.
Intervales Ski-Hill	Nordic combined (ski jumping), Ski jumping	18,000	
Lake Placid Equestrian Stadium	Opening ceremonies	30,000	
Lake Placid Olympic Sports Complex Cross Country Biathlon Center	Biathlon, Cross-country skiing, Nordic combined (Cross-country skiing)	Not listed.	
Mt. Van Hoevenberg Bob and Luge Run	Bobsleigh, Luge (Separate tracks)	11,000 (bobsleigh)	
Olympic Center Arena	Figure skating, Ice hockey	8,500	
Olympic Arena	Figure skating, Ice hockey	2,000	
James B. Sheffield Speed Skating Oval	Speed skating	7,500	
Whiteface Mountain	Alpine skiing	Not listed	

== Before the Olympics ==
Lake Placid hosted the Winter Olympics in 1932 with all five venues used for those games being used for the 1980 Winter Olympics. The city made four unsuccessful bids for the Winter Olympics in 1960, 1968, 1972, and 1976 before being awarded the 1980 Winter Olympics by the International Olympic Committee (IOC) in 1974. Between the 1932 Winter Games and the 1980 Winter Games, Lake Placid played host to Winter Sports Championships, the first time many of them were held outside of Europe.

After the 1932 Games, the speedskating oval hosted the World Allround Speed Skating Championships for Men. The bob run hosted the FIBT World Championships in 1949, 1961, 1969, 1973, and 1978. In 1950, the FIS Nordic World Ski Championships took place at the ski jump used for the 1932 Games for the ski jumping and the ski jumping part of the Nordic combined event. Biathlon held their first World Championships outside of Europe at Lake Placid in 1973.

When Lake Placid was awarded the 1980 Winter Games in 1974, venue adjustments were needed. For the alpine skiing events, snow making equipment was used. This was used to make 4 ft (1.2 m) of man-made snow to cover all of the trails used for the events. Six new ski lifts and electronic timing/ scoring systems were also constructed. For the Nordic skiing events (cross-country skiing, Nordic combined, ski jumping), a total of 26 event officials were sent as observers to the 1978 world championships in Lahti, Finland to understand the venue needs for the 1980 Games. For the 50 km race, a total of 266 acres (108 ha) was purchased and a trail system was created that involved tree-clearing. Man-made snow was also applied for the cross-country skiing trail. Races over 10 km in length were modified to meet the snow requirements as defined by the International Ski Federation. An electronic scoreboard was installed for the cross-country skiing events. This information was passed onto organizers for the 1984 Winter Olympics in Sarajevo. Two new ski jumps were constructed. The 70 m (230 ft) jump was constructed between May 1977 and December 1978. Construction for the 90 m (300 ft) jump also started in May 1977, but was not done until the February 1979 test event to construction delays caused by the bankruptcy of the steel contractor. Biathlon used trails similar to cross-country skiing though a separate finish area was used. A protective shooting area of 125 by 95 m (410 by 312 ft) was built for the competition of 90 by 50 m (300 by 160 ft) for 36 shooting stations was built. To cover 25 km (16 mi) of biathlon trails, twelve snow-making guns were used.

Speed skating had increased refrigeration access, improved locker room, improved lighting, electronic timing/ scoring systems, and an electronic scoreboard. The World Sprint Speed Skating Championships were held at the Oval in 1978 and proved beneficial on how to run the event. A separate facility was constructed near the Olympic Center for figure skating with renovation taking place at the Center itself between spring 1977 and November 1979. The biggest change was at the bob and luge track with the construction of a refrigeration system for the bob run following the 1978 World Championships in Lake Placid that also served as the test event for the 1980 Games. A new luge track was built between fall 1977 and February 1979. The original plan for the luge track was to include bobsleigh two-man on the track, but that was abandoned to excessive costs. It was the first luge track in North America. This was also the last Winter Olympics that would have separate bobsleigh and luge tracks.

== During the Olympics ==
Cross-country skiing was first timed to the nearest full second from the first Winter Olympics in 1924 until 1956. By the time of the 1960 Winter Olympics, both biathlon and cross-country skiing began timing their events to the tenth of the second. Twelve years later, biathlon and cross-country skiing timing was measured in the hundredths of a second. In the men' 15 km cross-country skiing event, Sweden's Thomas Wassberg beat out Finland's Juha Mieto by 0.01 seconds, the closest finish in Olympic history. This would lead International Ski Federation officials to measure all cross-country skiing time to the tenth of a second. Biathlon followed suit with cross-country skiing and by the time of the 1984 Winter Olympics in Sarajevo, both sports had their times measured in tenths of a second.

The former Will Rogers Memorial Hospital was briefly used as press headquarters.

== After the Olympics ==
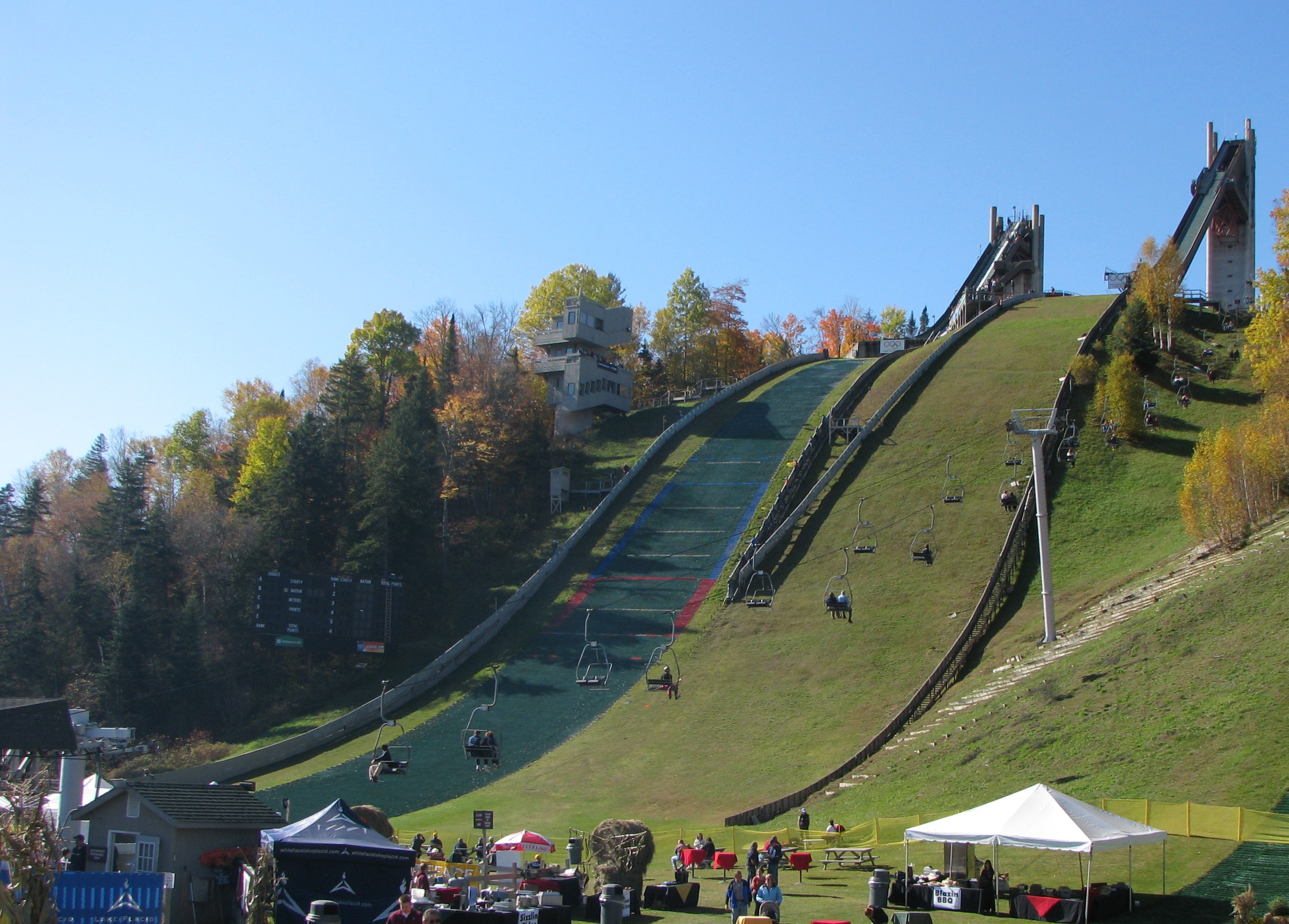
The jumps from below in 2008, showing the landing hills. The 120-meter (K120) jump is at the right.

Lake Placid was considered ideal for the available infrastructure from the 1932 Winter Olympics, most notably the Bobsleigh run. The existing facilities meant the Olympics could be staged on a reasonable budget and with limited environmental impact. It was not just a matter of convenience, either, according to Lake Placid's congressman, Representative Robert McEwen. "It is no secret to us in America that the measure of federal support given to athletes in Communist countries (so that they win medals and improve the countries' image abroad) is on a level unknown to us here in America," he told Congress." This would be a step in the right direction, a worthy investment in American winter athletes."

The local Olympic committee needed congressional approval for funding to build the Olympic Village. Congress required an after use contract for facilities, and it was agreed that the Olympic Village would be built in accordance to Federal Bureau of Prisons needs. Following the Olympic Games, it was repurposed for Federal Correctional Institution, Ray Brook.

The luge track hosted the FIL World Luge Championships in 1983, the first time the championships were held outside of Europe. Meanwhile, the bobsleigh track would host the FIBT World Championships in 1997 in men's skeleton. In the late 1990s, the luge track was demolished and replaced with a combination bobsleigh, luge, and skeleton track was built that would be completed in time for the 2000 Winter Goodwill Games. The combination venue hosted the men's bobsleigh World Championships in 2003. In 2009, the combination track became the first track to host the bobsleigh, luge, and skeleton world championships the same year in a non-Winter Olympic year. On 4 February 2010, the entire venue was added to the National Register of Historic Places in the United States.

Lake Placid host the men's version of the Biathlon World Championships in 1987. The city also hosted the first FIS Freestyle World Ski Championships held outside of Europe in 1991.

In 1994, the ski jumps were upgraded to meet the International Ski Federation requirements of K90 and K120.

The Olympic Center Arena continues to be used and was renamed the Herb Brooks Arena in 2005 after the coach of 1980 US ice hockey team.
