= Olympic emblem =

Logo designed for Olympic Games

The five-ringed emblem of the Olympic Games.

Each Olympic Games has its own Olympic emblem, which is a design integrating the Olympic rings with one or more distinctive elements. They are created and proposed by the Organising Committee of the Olympic Games (OCOG) or the National Olympic Committee (NOC) of the host country. It is the responsibility of the International Olympic Committee (IOC) to approve Olympic emblems for the Olympic games. The Olympic emblems are used in promotional materials, by sponsors of the Olympics, and on the uniforms of every Olympic competitor. All emblems are the property of the IOC.

== 2008 Beijing Olympic Emblem ==
The emblem draws on various elements of Chinese culture, depicting a traditional red Chinese seal above the words "Beijing 2008" and the Olympic rings. The seal is inscribed with a stylised calligraphic rendition of the Chinese character 京 (jīng, meaning 'capital', from the name of the host city) in the form of a dancing figure. The curves are also claimed to suggest the body of a wriggling Chinese dragon. The open arms of the figure symbolise the invitation of China to the world to share in its culture. The figure also resembles that of a runner crossing the finish line. Red, the dominant colour of the emblem, is an important colour in Chinese society, often signifying good luck.

== 2010 Vancouver Olympic Emblem ==
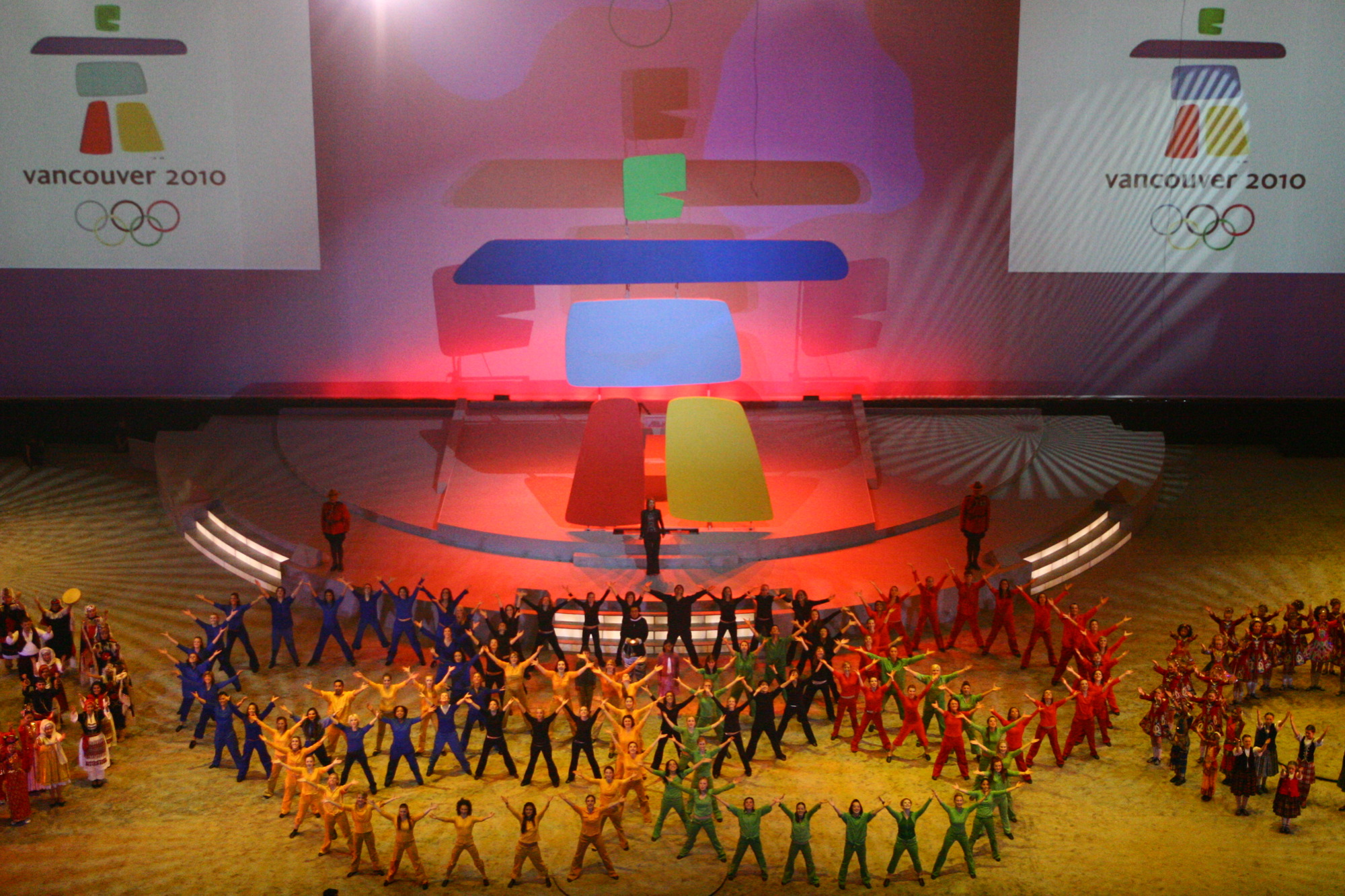
Unveiling ceremony of the 2010 Winter Olympics emblem, Ilanaaq, April 23, 2005

The 2010 Winter Olympics logo was unveiled on April 23, 2005, and is named Ilanaaq the Inunnguaq. Ilanaaq is the Inuktitut word for friend. The logo was based on the Inukshuk (stone landmark or cairn) built by Alvin Kanak for the Northwest Territories Pavilion at Expo 86 and donated to the City of Vancouver after the event. It is now used as a landmark on English Bay Beach.

== 2012 Innsbruck Youth Olympic Emblem ==
The official emblem for the first Winter Youth Olympics was presented during the 2010 Winter Olympics at Austria House in Whistler, Canada, and it reflects the vibrant, youthful city in the heart of the Alps combined with its traditional and natural way of life, while it includes the Goldenes Dachl, a famous landmark of Innsbruck.

== 2012 London Olympic Emblem ==
The 2012 Olympic emblem is a representation of the number 2012, with the Olympic Rings embedded within the zero. It was surrounded by controversies and drew many complaints. Some say it resembled Lisa Simpson engaging in a sexual act with Bart Simpson, while others said it meant to spell out the word "Zion". This created tension in Iran, as the country then threatened to boycott the 2012 games. The font was heavily criticized, but was meant to display edginess and appeal to the younger generation through its look. The emblem wanted to use Olympic values such as pushing oneself to inspire the many people, especially the youth, that watched the games. Ultimately, the emblem worked to improve the world view of the city of London. Along with this, the emblem made no reference to any sport or landmark in London. This was to show that the games were open for everyone, not just people in London, or people of a specific sport. The Olympic emblem was also notable, because the designs were very similar for the Paralympic games. This worked to emphasize the idea that the games were meant for everyone.

== 2014 Sochi Olympic Emblem ==
The 2014 Sochi emblem was designed to reach out to the newer generation by becoming the first emblem to have a web address in it. It was also one of only three emblems that was text only and did not contain an artistic element. The emblem was meant to be a symbol for more than just sports, hoping to embody themes such as socioeconomics and the environment. The creative process that led to the eventual emblem contained ideas that featured many more traditional or artistic components. Ultimately, this emblem was chosen because of it was "more future-oriented". One of the original emblem designs integrated Russian Khokhloma art, while another draft was more modern and contained physical representations of Russia. The emblem that was chosen worked to show a new up and coming side of Russia that contained elements of positive change.

== 2014 Nanjing Youth Olympic Emblem ==
The design of the logo was presented in May 2011 and it commemorates Nanjing's rich history by incorporating the Gate of China and the features of some Jiangnan houses in the wording, while the various colors symbolize youths' energetic spirit and passion for sports and culture. According to Jacques Rogge, then president of the International Olympic Committee (IOC), "above all, this emblem embodies the Olympic values of excellence, friendship and respect".

== 2016 Lillehammer Youth Olympic Emblem ==
Presented in November 2013, the logo of the 2016 Winter Youth Olympics was designed by for young students from Gjøvik University College and according to the Organising Committee it is a clear, neat and subtle emblem that embodies Norwegian ideals.

== 2016 Rio Olympic Emblem ==
The 2016 Rio Olympic Emblem was designed to captivate the audience and display many different themes relating to the games. The logo was meant to embody the cariocas, or Brazilian locals. The people embracing each other in the emblem are meant to be welcoming and friendly, while the silhouette of the embrace is meant to outline the Sugarloaf Mountain. The people not only outline the mountain, but are meant to "embrace the city". The shapes of the body also spell out the word "Rio". The themes that the emblem represents are known as the "emblem pillars". The pillars included are centered around "passion and transformation," and branch into smaller groups including: "harmonious diversity, Olympic spirit, exuberant nature, and captivating energy". Further, the subcategories of these themes include: "youthful spirit, unity, excellence, achievement, inspiration, sustainability, celebration, and optimism".

== 2018 Pyeongchang Olympic Emblem ==
The official Olympic emblem for the 2018 Winter Olympics was launched in May 2013 at a gala ceremony held simultaneously in PyeongChang and in Seoul. The shapes that form the logo stem from the first consonants of each syllable in the word “PyeongChang” when it is written in Hangul, the first character in the emblem also represents a gathering place where the three elements of Korea’s traditional humanism – heaven, earth, and human – are in harmony. The second character symbolises snow and ice, as well as the athletes’ stellar performances.

== 2018 Buenos Aires Youth Olympic Emblem ==
The official emblem of the 2018 Summer Youth Olympics to be held in Buenos Aires was presented in July 2015, three years before the games. The emblem reflects the diversity of Buenos Aires and is inspired by the city’s vibrant colours, eclectic culture, iconic architecture and the many neighbourhoods that make up the Argentinian capital. Each letter represents a famous landmark, including the Floralis Genérica, Space Tower, the Columbus Theatre, the National Library and the Obelisk. A short video produced by the Buenos Aires Youth Olympic Games Organising Committee (BAYOGOC) shows what each letter on the emblem relates to.

== 2020 Lausanne Youth Olympic Emblem ==
The emblem features the line connecting the words "Lausanne 2020".

== 2020 Tokyo Olympic Emblem ==
The first version of the Tokyo 2020 Summer Olympics emblem was unveiled on July 24, 2015. The emblem was based on the letter "T" for "Tokyo", "Tomorrow" and "Tram", ostensibly created by Japanese designer Kenjiro Sano. However, one week after unveiling the emblem, it was discovered that the idea had been plagiarized from another emblem previously designed by Olivier Debie for use by Théâtre de Liège in Belgium. On September 2, 2015 the emblem was withdrawn. On April 25, 2016, a newer emblem was unveiled, named "Harmonized Chequered Emblem" created by Asao Tokolo.

== 2022 Beijing Olympic Emblem ==
The emblem of the 2022 Winter Olympics was unveiled on December 15, 2017. The emblem is named "Winter Dream". It is inspired by a Chinese character "冬" (Winter) with the ribbon motif, representing and traditional and modern Chinese culture. On the upper part is the skater and the lower part is the skier. It also combines with the colors of the olympic and Chinese flags. The emblem was created by Chinese artist Lin Cunzhen. Cunzhen works as an associated professor at China Central Academy of Fine Arts, and she also created the paralympic emblem, the bid emblem and the Nanjing 2014 Summer Youth Olympics emblem.

== 2024 Paris Olympic Emblem ==
The emblem of the 2024 Summer Olympics was unveiled on 21 October 2019 at the Grand Rex. The emblem is inspired by three symbols, the gold medal, the flame and Marianne, and was designed by the agency Royalties.

== 2026 Milan-Cortina d'Ampezzo Olympic Emblem ==
The official emblem of Milano-Cortina 2026 was decided through a global online vote that opened on 6 March 2021. The two candidate emblems were unveiled at the Sanremo Music Festival 2021 by former Italian Olympic gold medallists Federica Pellegrini and Alberto Tomba and are nicknamed "Dado" and "Futura". They were both designed by Landor Associates. It is reportedly the first time that the emblem of an Olympic Games will be decided by the public, the vote closed on 25 March 2021, the winning emblem, the "Futura" emblem, was announced on 30 March 2021.

== 2028 Los Angeles Olympic Emblem ==
The official emblem of Los Angeles 2028 was unveiled on September 1, 2020, featuring the characters "LA" and "28" in a stacked layout. The "A" in "LA" is designed to be interchangeable, with a multitude of variations created in collaboration with different athletes, artists, designers, celebrities, and other figures (such as musician Billie Eilish, Indian-Canadian comedian Lilly Singh, and actress Reese Witherspoon). Organizing committee chairman Casey Wasserman explained that the multitude of variations was intended to "showcase our community's collective creativity and celebrate the diversity that makes us strong", as the city "defies a singular identity". Chief marketing officer Amy Gleeson stated that the emblem was designed to "foster a deeper connection with the audience who will be in their 20s and 30s when the games happen."
