= Royalties (brand management agency) =

French branding company

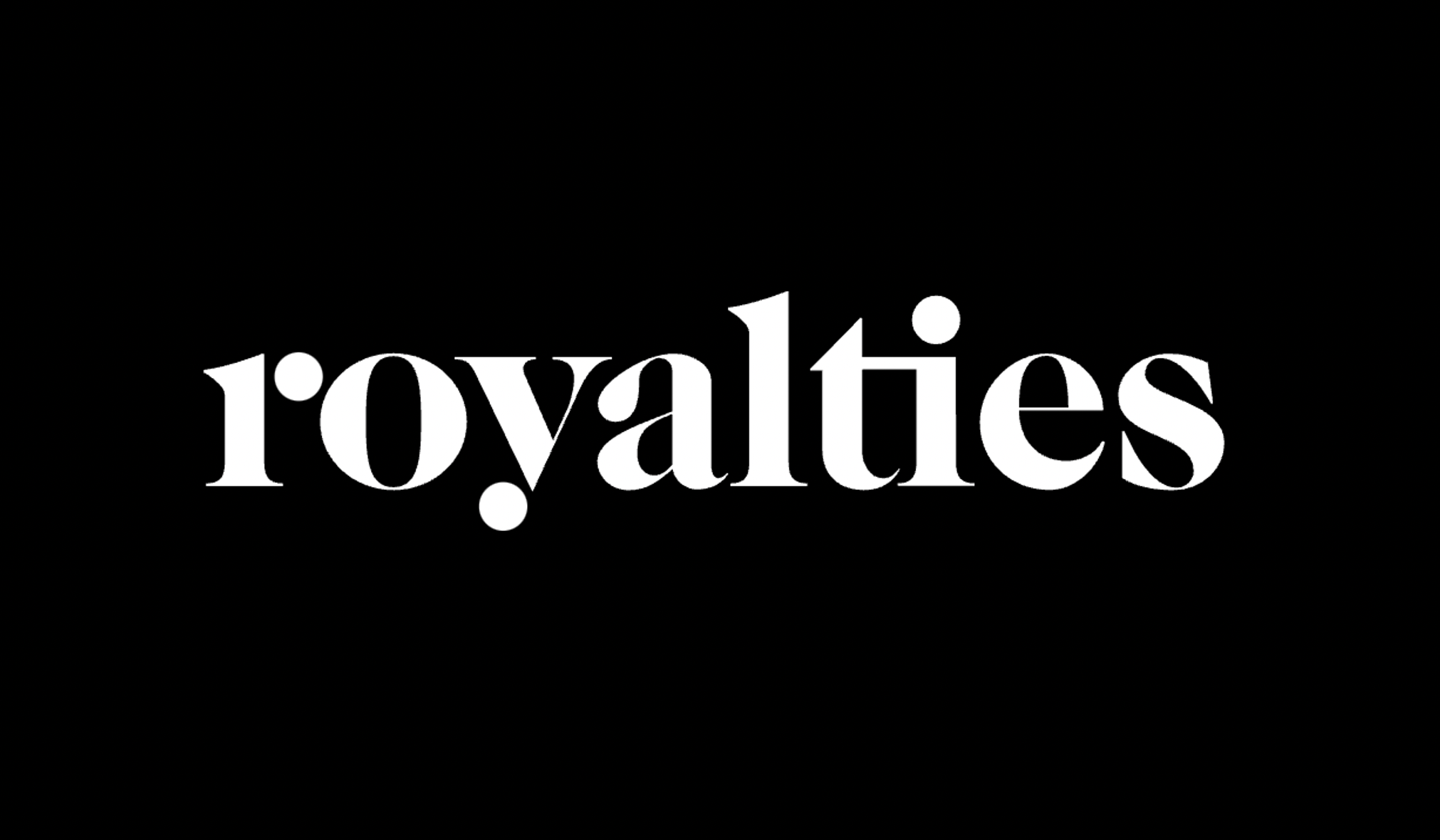
- Industry: Brand management
- Founded: 2008, Paris, France
- Founder: David Jobin, Olivier Bontemps, Alexandre De Coupigny
- Headquarters: Paris, France, China
- Products: Ecobranding, design, brand consulting, brand architecture, communications.
- Website: www.royalties.fr

Royalties is a brand management agency based in Paris, France. The agency was originally created in 2008 as Publicis Royalties, by Publicis Worldwide and Eurogroup Consulting and is now independently owned by two of the founding partners: David Jobin and Olivier Bontemps. The agency has offices in France and China.

== History ==
Jobin met Alexandre De Coupigny while they were both employed at Interbrand in 2003, with the former serving as managing director and the latter as director of Brand Valuation. In 2008, they joined with Bontemps, co-founder of the agency View, which specialized in motion design, to launch their own agency. The trio pitched their branding agency project to several major organisations, one of which was the Publicis Group.

Publicis France, under the leadership of Philippe Lenstchener (past president of Publicis France), was looking to develop a brand management offering. Publicis and Eurogroup jointly contributed to the founding of the agency, which became the flagship branding agency of the Publicis Group. It grew from the financial assessment of brands to the creation and management of brands, from their positioning in the market to their visual and verbal identities.

Radio France, Orange S.A., La Société des bains de mer de Monaco and Pages Jaunes formed the agency's initial client-base. In the following years it would win further projects for Atos, HSBC, Castorama, Deutsch Telekom group, Galeries Lafayette, Kingfisher, Société Générale, SFR, and the Palace of Versailles, among others.

In 2014, Publicis sold its 60% stake in Royalties to the agency's founding members, giving Royalties its independence. Shortly after, De Coupigny left the agency.

== 2018 - the move to Ecobranding ==
Sylvain Boyer, the founder of Ecobranding, joined Royalties in 2018. The overarching principle of Ecobranding is to cut down on the resources used to communicate a brand. It reduces the environmental and financial costs of communications and is verified by an independent scientific review. Though it uses less, the aim of Ecobranding is to distill a brand's visual expression and improve its impact and accessibility, as well as being visible proof of a company's commitment to change.

Royalties has since adapted its client approach to incorporate Boyer's research and findings, with the addition of an extra pillar, ‘resilience’, to the existing brand model of ‘meaning, appearance, and experience.’ This marked a significant change in Royalties raison d’etre, a codified acknowledgment that no brand can be complete without meeting the obligations it has to society.

Many of Royalties’ best-known clients have adopted elements of the Ecobranding method, including Orange S.A. Royalties was approached for a full review of Orange's physical and digital touchpoints. As a brand that is seen mostly on digital, Royalties designed a new, simpler digital logo with higher visibility, 56% less data, and 28% less ink.

The new decade gave Royalties a bigger platform to display its commitment to ecobranding. Atos, a global frontrunner in decarbonized and secure IT, sought a complete refresh of its visual identity. Royalties won the tender by proposing a novel solution based around a single principle: keep screens dark, and keep paper white. The designs were chosen to use less energy on digital and less ink on paper. These comprehensive changes were reviewed and validated independently.

In 2024 Summer Olympics, the IOC expressed a wish for the Paris Olympics to be the most inclusive Games ever held, with respect to the Paralympics and gender equality. The winning design proposed by Royalties is a rich combination of Parisian architecture, French personality, Olympic iconography, inclusion, and, of course, ecobranding. The design is the first female face used in the Olympics; it uses few lines, is geometrically pure, and uses only one colour; and it is the first logo to be used for both the Olympics and the Paralympics.

== Masters course at Sciences Po ==
In association with TWBA, Royalties created and continues to manage the Master's degree course in branding at the School of Communication at l’Institut d’études politiques de Paris, the sister university of the London School of Economics. The program is offered in French and international English language versions. The course is run by Jobin and features many of the senior consultants from Royalties as guest professors. The agency also has a programme with the University of Oxford, the University of Bath and the University of Birmingham to promote the mobility of students abroad.

== Recognition ==
Royalties has received several awards for its work: Les Trophées LSA de l’Innovation (with Carré Noir) for the Castorama smart store concept and the Grand Prix Stratégies Design (2nd prize) for the PagesJaunes redesign.

It was also nominated for the Club des Directeurs Artistiques in 2011 for TUL LAVAL.COM, and for the Super Design award in 2010 for Orange Wi-Fi and Fnac Pro.

The logo for the 2024 Summer Olympics was described as the "most influential logo release of year" by the Creative Review, and received 543 online press articles in 24 hours.
