= 1980 Winter Olympics =

Multi-sport event in Lake Placid, New York, US

XIII Olympic Winter Games
- Emblem of the 1980 Winter Olympics (Note: The emblem was a line that formed the Adirondacks, which became a column on the left, paying tribute to the ancient Olympic games. The top of the column was serrated to hold the Olympic rings. This represented a double cauldron, acknowledging that the Olympics were also held in Lake Placid in 1932. It was also used as a poster for the 1980 Winter Olympics.)
- Location: Lake Placid, New York, United States
- Nations: 37
- Athletes: 1,073 (841 men, 232 women)
- Events: 38 in 6 sports (10 disciplines)
- Opening: February 13, 1980
- Closing: February 24, 1980
- Opened by: Vice President Walter Mondale
- Closed by: IOC President Lord Killanin
- Cauldron: Charles Morgan Kerr
- Stadium: Lake Placid Equestrian Stadium

The 1980 Winter Olympics, officially the XIII Olympic Winter Games and also known as Lake Placid 1980, were an international multi-sport event held from February 13 to 24, 1980, in Lake Placid, New York, United States.

Lake Placid was elected as the host city for the 1980 Winter Games at the 75th International Olympic Committee (IOC) Session in Vienna, Austria, in 1974. This marked the second time the Upstate New York village hosted the Winter Games, after 1932. The only other candidate city to bid for the 1980 games, Vancouver–Garibaldi, withdrew before the final vote.

Some venues from the 1932 Games were renovated for use in the 1980 Games, and events were held at the Olympic Center, Whiteface Mountain, Mt. Van Hoevenberg Olympic Bobsled Run, the Olympic Ski Jumps, the Cascade Cross Country Ski Center, and the Lake Placid High School Speed Skating Oval. The Games were a success in terms of sport, but the organization was criticized because of numerous transport problems. The 1980 Games were the last to take place in a city of less than 15,000 inhabitants.

The Lake Placid Winter Olympics brought together 1,072 athletes from 37 countries to take part in six sports and 10 disciplines comprising a total of 38 official events (one more than in 1976). People's Republic of China, Cyprus, and Costa Rica participated in the Winter Olympic Games for the first time. American speed skater Eric Heiden set the record for most medals for an athlete in one edition of the Winter Olympic Games after he medaled in all five speed skating events. The Olympic ice hockey tournament saw the young American team defeat the heavily favored Soviet professionals in what became known as the Miracle on Ice, on their way to the gold medal. In the other disciplines, Soviet Nikolaj Zimjatov won three gold medals in cross-country skiing and the Liechtenstein skier Hanni Wenzel won her country's first two gold medals in alpine skiing. The Soviet Union finished first in the medal standings, with ten gold medals, while East Germany won the most medals overall, 23. The United States was third on both counts.

== Context ==
=== Selection of the host city ===
After Lake Placid hosted the 1932 Olympic Winter Games, the community continued to bid on upcoming editions of the Games, submitting seven total bid attempts, including 1948, 1952, and 1956. Three of these were supported by the United States Olympic Committee and presented to the International Olympic Committee: 1968, 1976, and 1980. Until 1980, each of the bid attempts failed, either due to falling short of gaining support at the national level, or during the IOC vote. When Denver withdrew after being selected to host the 1976 Winter Games, the USOC initially supported Salt Lake City to replace Denver. But on January 26, 1973, the Salt Lake City bid collapsed due to unsecured financial backing and discontent by Utah residents. Lake Placid and the USOC submitted a late bid to host the 1976 Games to the IOC in February 1973, as there was a risk that the selection process would be canceled due to the lack of interested parties. The IOC selected Innsbruck, Austria, to host the 1976 Games in place of Denver, with Lake Placid finishing as the runner-up. IOC president Lord Killanin later stated that members of the IOC executive favored the Austrian bid as a way to "make peace with the people of Austria" over the controversial decision in 1972 to declare Austrian skiing star Karl Schranz ineligible for the games as an alleged "professional athlete".

Undeterred, Lake Placid re-sent the same campaign materials that were originally used for the 1976 bid to the United States Olympic Committee on November 20, 1973, and made the official bid in September 1974. The United States Olympic Committee, embarrassed by Denver's 1976 withdrawal, required Lake Placid's bid to be widely supported by residents and government. Lake Placid satisfied the USOC requirements, with a referendum held in October 1973 garnering 75 percent support for hosting the games, a joint resolution of the New York Legislature, a joint resolution from the Congress of the United States, and a letter of support from the Governor of New York and the president of the United States. Lake Placid also secured the support of the environmental groups Sierra Club and Adirondack Mountain Club.

Three other cities declared themselves candidates for the 1980 Winter Games: Vancouver—Garibaldi (Canada), Lahti (Finland), and Chamonix (France). The bids for Lahti and Chamonix were withdrawn early in the bid process, and Vancouver (the latter hosted the 2010 games), which was unable to obtain the support of the Government of British Columbia, withdrew its candidacy on October 4, 1974. The members of the IOC awarded the 1980 Winter Games to Lake Placid on October 23, 1974, during the 75th IOC Session in Vienna.

1980 Winter Olympics host selection
City	NOC	Votes
Lake Placid	United States	Unanimous
Vancouver—Garibaldi	Canada	Withdrew
Chamonix	France	Withdrew
Lahti	Finland	Withdrew

=== International political context ===
The Lake Placid Games took place in the shadow of the Cold War with a number of other complex international events occurring in the leadup to the games. In November 1979, sixty-two Americans were taken hostage at the United States embassy in Tehran by Iranian militants, a situation that would not resolve until after the Games. In December 1979, the Soviet Union began the invasion of Afghanistan, which led to United States President Jimmy Carter calling for the international boycott of the 1980 Summer Games in Moscow. The Western governments first considered the idea of boycotting the Moscow 1980 Summer Olympics in response to the situation in Afghanistan at the December 20, 1979, meeting of NATO representatives. The idea was not completely new to the world: in the mid-1970s, proposals for an Olympic boycott circulated widely among human rights activists and groups as a sanction for Soviet violations of human rights. At that time, very few member governments expressed interest in the proposal. However, the idea gained popularity in early January 1980 when Soviet nuclear scientist and dissident Andrei Sakharov called for a boycott. On January 14, 1980, the Carter Administration joined Sakharov's appeal and set a deadline by which the Soviet Union must pull out of Afghanistan or face the consequences, including an international boycott of the games. On January 26, 1980, Canadian Prime Minister Joe Clark announced that Canada, like the US, would boycott the Olympic Games if Soviet forces did not leave Afghanistan by February 20, 1980. Carter also proposed moving the Olympics to Greece on a permanent basis to eliminate the issue of politicization of the Games' hosting, but the IOC rejected the idea. Ultimately, 66 nations boycotted the 1980 Summer Olympics, but this did not impact the Lake Placid Games.

Another ongoing international situation was the conflict between the People's Republic of China and Taiwan. Taiwan competed under the name of "Republic of China" and with its national flag until the 1976 Winter Games. In October 1979, the IOC recognized the Olympic Committee of the People's Republic of China after threats from China to withdraw from the Games, and forced Taiwan to take the name "Chinese Taipei" and to adopt a new flag for the 1980 Games. The decision was appealed to a Swiss court and was upheld on January 15, 1980. The Taiwanese delegation refused to comply with the IOC's decision and arrived at the Olympic Village with the same flag and the same name as before. After being refused entry, the Taiwan team canceled its participation in the Games. The People's Republic of China, which threatened to withdraw if Taiwan participated under the name of "Republic of China", took part in its first Olympic Games since 1952 and the first Winter Games in its history.

== Organization ==
=== Organizing Committee ===
The Lake Placid Olympic Organizing Committee (LPOOC) was established as a not-for-profit corporation in December 1974. Its board of directors was made up of 48 people, with a 13-member executive board. Ron MacKenzie, who was instrumental in developing the region and securing the Games, was the chair of the organizing committee when it was founded. He died in December 1978, fourteen months before the start of the Games. J. Bernard Fell was the chairman of the board of directors and Art Devlin was the vice-chairman. The LPOOC's vision for the Games was a simple Games that would return to the basics of the Olympic movement.

=== Finances ===
The budget for the 1980 Winter Olympic Games grew from an initial projection of US$30 million, to a total of US$168.7 million. The cost of the games was financed by three parties, the federal government ($82.7 million), the State of New York ($32.4 million), and the organizing committee ($53.6 million). In the 2016 study of cost overruns at Olympic Games at Oxford University, researchers found the Lake Placid Winter Olympic Games had the largest cost overruns of any Winter Games at 324 percent above the planned cost. The budget overruns were attributed to environmental protection measures, additional work undertaken to modernize existing facilities, overly optimistic cost estimates, and inflation. The Games ended with a deficit of $8.5 million. After a request for funds and the authorities' refusal, the organizing committee saw no other option but to declare bankruptcy, but in January 1981 the Governor of New York announced that the remaining deficit would be paid by New York State.

The construction was financed by the federal government and the State of New York at a total cost of $92 million, including $22.7 million for the Olympic Village, $16.9 million for the Olympic Center, more than $15 million for the alpine ski center of Whiteface Mountain, $7.9 million for the facilities of Mount Van Hoevenberg (cross-country skiing, bobsleigh, and biathlon), $5.4 million for the ski jumps, and $5.3 million for the bobsled run. Additional costs included transport improvements totaling $4.8 million, the extension of the electricity and hydroelectric network at $2.7 million, and construction for the headquarters of the New York State Police at $3.8 million. In addition, $8 million was allocated for security costs. The expenses of the organizing committee were mainly administrative totaling $48.1 million.

The increasing costs for the Games and charges of nepotism and mismanagement resulted in a federal auditor investigating the LPOOC. Public questions regarding accounting practices and contract awards resulted in the LPOOC's marketing director being replaced. Further scrutiny came when another director was asked to resign when it became public that the individual had not filed income taxes for a number of years. The company awarded the food management contract for the Games came under federal investigation for associations with organized crime.

Revenue for the LPOOC came primarily from sponsorship contracts signed with more than 200 companies totaling around $30 million in cash, goods or services, and from the sale of broadcasting rights totaling $21 million and included $8 million donated to the IOC.

Around 550,000 tickets were distributed for the 1980 Winter Olympic Games. Ticket distribution to the public included different regions of the United States (65.8%), Canada (6%), and other countries (8.2%). The remainder was distributed among sponsors and suppliers (8.7%), the US Olympic Committee, the organizing committee, authorities, donors, and authorized companies (10.1%), or kept in reserve (1.2%). The public prices for tickets ranged from $15 to $70.

=== Security ===
Security for the Lake Placid Winter Games was provided by the New York State Police and 26 other agencies including the Federal Bureau of Investigation. The organizing committee also hired the private security company Pinkerton National Detective Agency. The security headquarters were located at Ray Brook, which also was the site of the Olympic Village. Police officers were trained in hostage negotiation techniques and various sensors were installed to detect any terrorist attack. A four-meter double barrier was erected surrounding the Olympic Village.

=== Transportation ===
The Lake Placid Winter Games were plagued with transportation problems complicating the planning and operations of the Games. The small mountain community did not have the accommodations or resources to handle the expected 50,000 spectators each day. Most of the accommodations within the community were reserved for Games officials and athletes' families, meaning spectators commuted as much as ninety miles (140 km) daily to attend events. Anticipating these challenges, the LPOOC prohibited private cars from entering Lake Placid for the duration of the Games. Instead the LPOOC provided parking and a shuttle system to transport spectators to the competition venues, and hired 60 taxis and 300 coaches, instead of the 450 initially planned, to be available to athletes, coaches, officials, and VIPs.

The first evidence that the Games would be plagued with transportation issues came a year earlier, at the pre-Olympic ski jumping competition in February 1979, which saw spectators create an eleven-mile (18 km) traffic jam. Once the Games started, the inadequate transportation planning was evident quickly as American and Soviet athletes arrived late for the opening ceremony. Throughout the Games, the main street of Lake Placid was often blocked by traffic jams, and journalists, spectators, and athletes found long waits at bus stops. Spectators were often left stranded, either missing events or unable to return home from events. After five days, Governor Hugh Carey declared a partial state of emergency to address the issues.

The LPOOC attributed the transportation challenges to, among other things, the lack of communication with transport companies and the state government.

=== Visual identity ===
The emblem of the 1980 Olympic Winter Games contained several symbols. The right part was reminiscent of the mountains surrounding Lake Placid and the left part was a stylized Ionic column that referred to the Ancient Olympics. The indentation at the top of the column represented two basins symbolizing the two editions of the Games organized in Lake Placid. On the Games poster, the Olympic rings overhung this emblem.

== Highlights ==
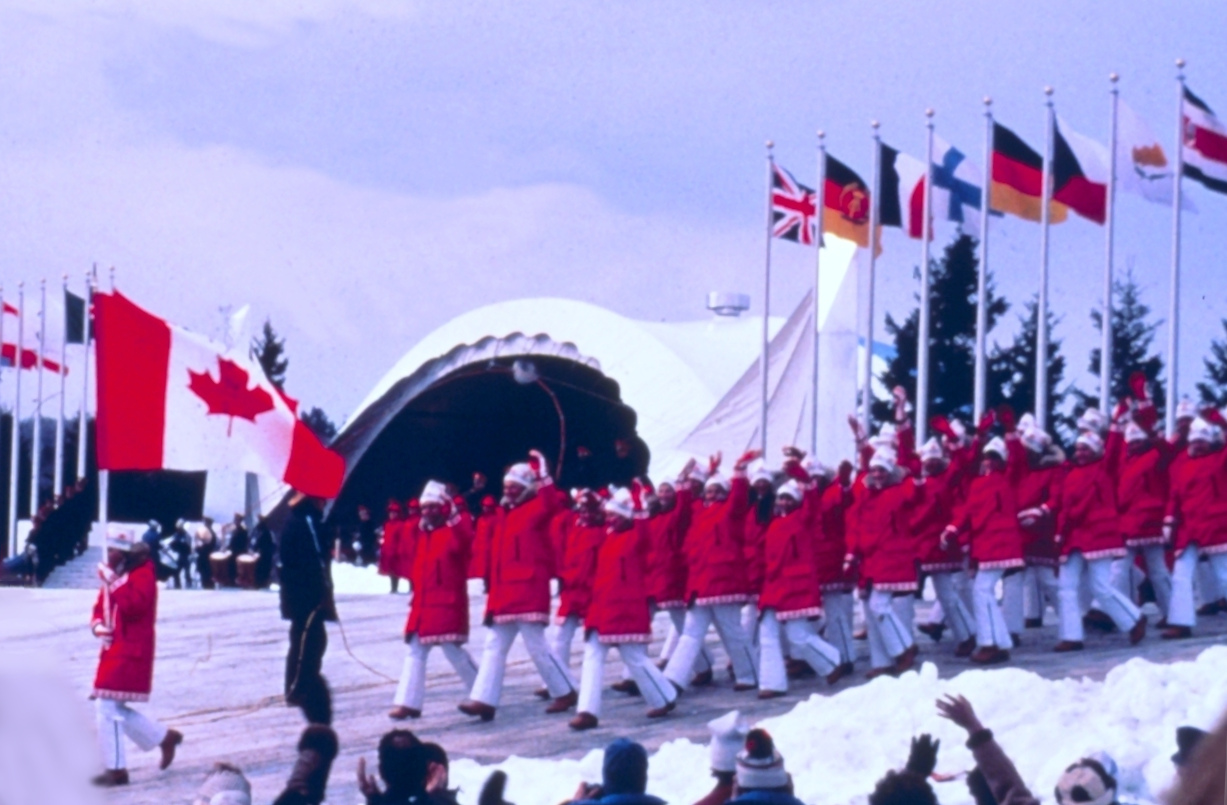
The Canadian Olympic team at the opening ceremony

Notable highlights included:

- The United States men's ice hockey team, composed mostly of collegiate players and not predicted to advance beyond group play, won the gold medal. The United States team's 4–3 win over the veteran and professional Soviet team, which came into the 1980 Games having won four consecutive Olympic gold medals, became known as the "Miracle on Ice" in American popular culture. The win captured the hearts of Americans, even though it was the win against Finland that secured the gold medal.
- Eric Heiden of the United States won gold in the 500 m, 1000 m, 1500 m, 5000 m, and 10,000 m speed skating events, setting four Olympic records and one world record (10,000 m) in the process and delivering 83% of the American gold medals (the only other gold, as noted above, was won by the hockey team). Heiden became the first person to win all five speed skating events, the first of only three to win five gold medals in individual events at a single Games (either Summer or Winter), and was the most successful athlete at a single edition of any Winter Olympics until 2026, when cross-country skier Johannes Høsflot Klæbo won six golds, although two of his medals were in team events. Heiden's record of five individual Olympic gold medals at a single Winter Games remains unmatched.
- Sweden's Ingemar Stenmark won both the giant slalom and the slalom.
- Hanni Wenzel won the women's giant slalom and slalom, making Liechtenstein the smallest country to produce an Olympic champion.
- Ulrich Wehling of East Germany and Irina Rodnina of the USSR won their respective events for the third time, Wehling in Nordic combined and Rodnina in pairs figure skating.
- Aleksandr Tikhonov of the USSR earned his fourth straight gold medal as part of the 4 × 7.5 km biathlon relay team.
- Nikolay Zimyatov of the USSR earned three gold medals in cross-country skiing.
- Robin Cousins won gold for Great Britain in the men's singles figure skating.
- East Germany won the most medals overall (23) but had fewer golds (9) than the USSR (10).
- In possibly the most dramatic duel of the games, Sweden's Thomas Wassberg edged Finland's Juha Mieto in the 15 km cross-country skiing by 0.01 seconds, the closest margin of victory ever in Olympic cross-country skiing.
- Although it did not get any medals, the People's Republic of China entered the Olympic Games for the first time after the IOC agreed to designate the Republic of China "Chinese Taipei".
- Lake Placid 1980 marked the first use of artificial snow in Olympic competition.

== Sports ==
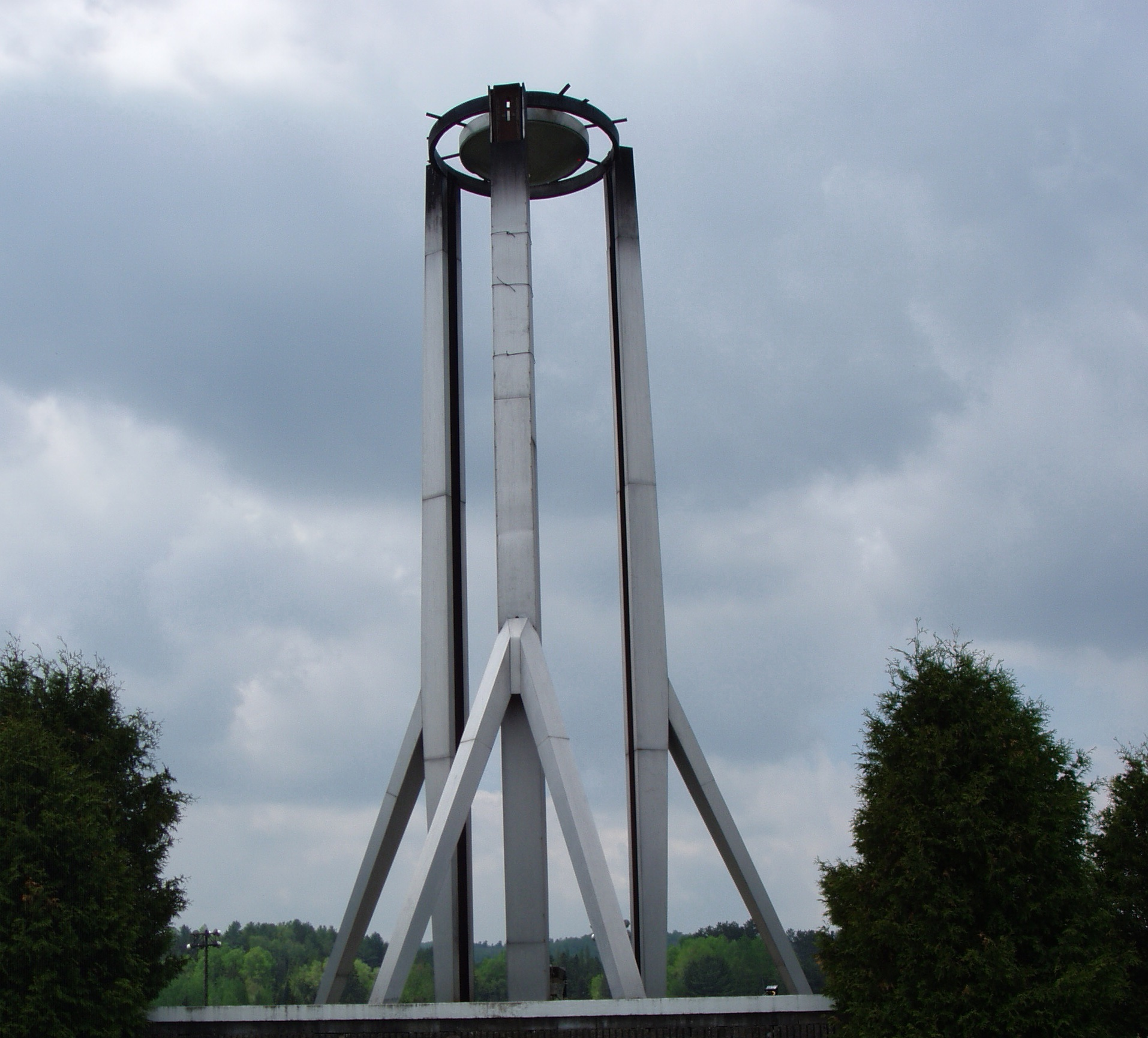
The Olympic cauldron

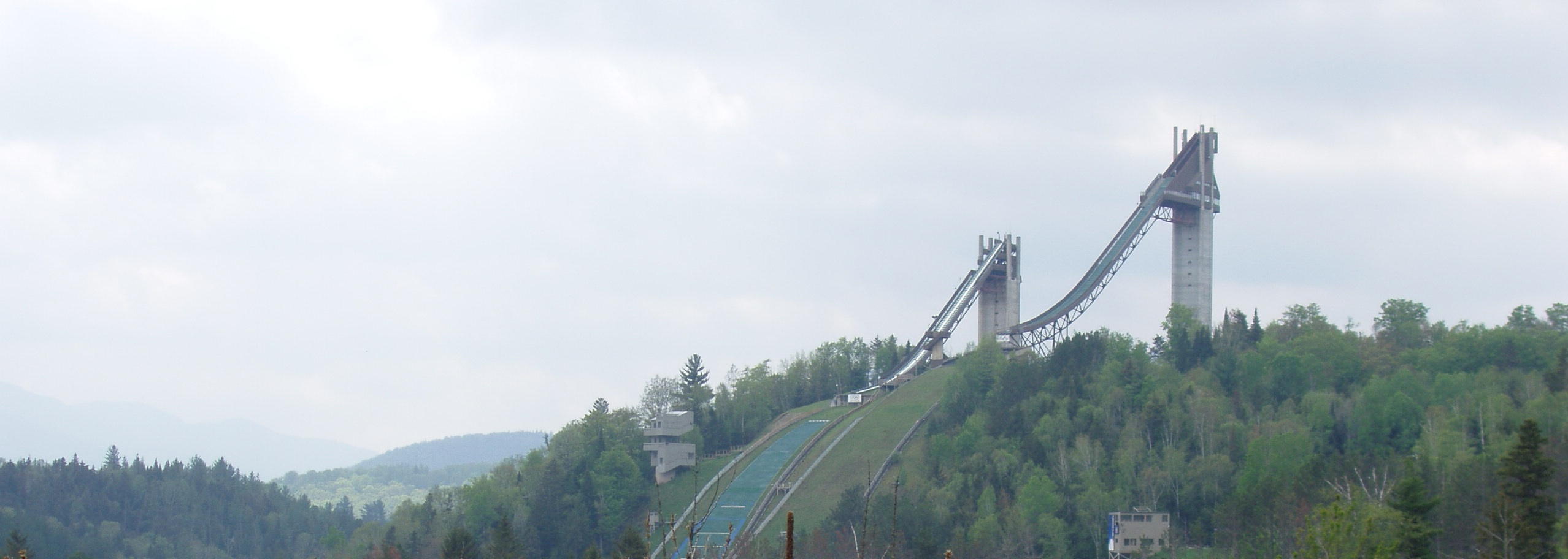
The Ski Jumping Complex

There were 38 events contested in six sports (ten disciplines):

- Alpine skiing (6) ()
- Biathlon (3) ()
- Bobsleigh (2) ()
- Cross-country skiing (7) ()
- Figure skating (4) ()
- Ice hockey (1) ()
- Luge (3) ()
- Nordic combined (1) ()
- Ski jumping (2) ()
- Speed skating (9) ()

== Venues ==
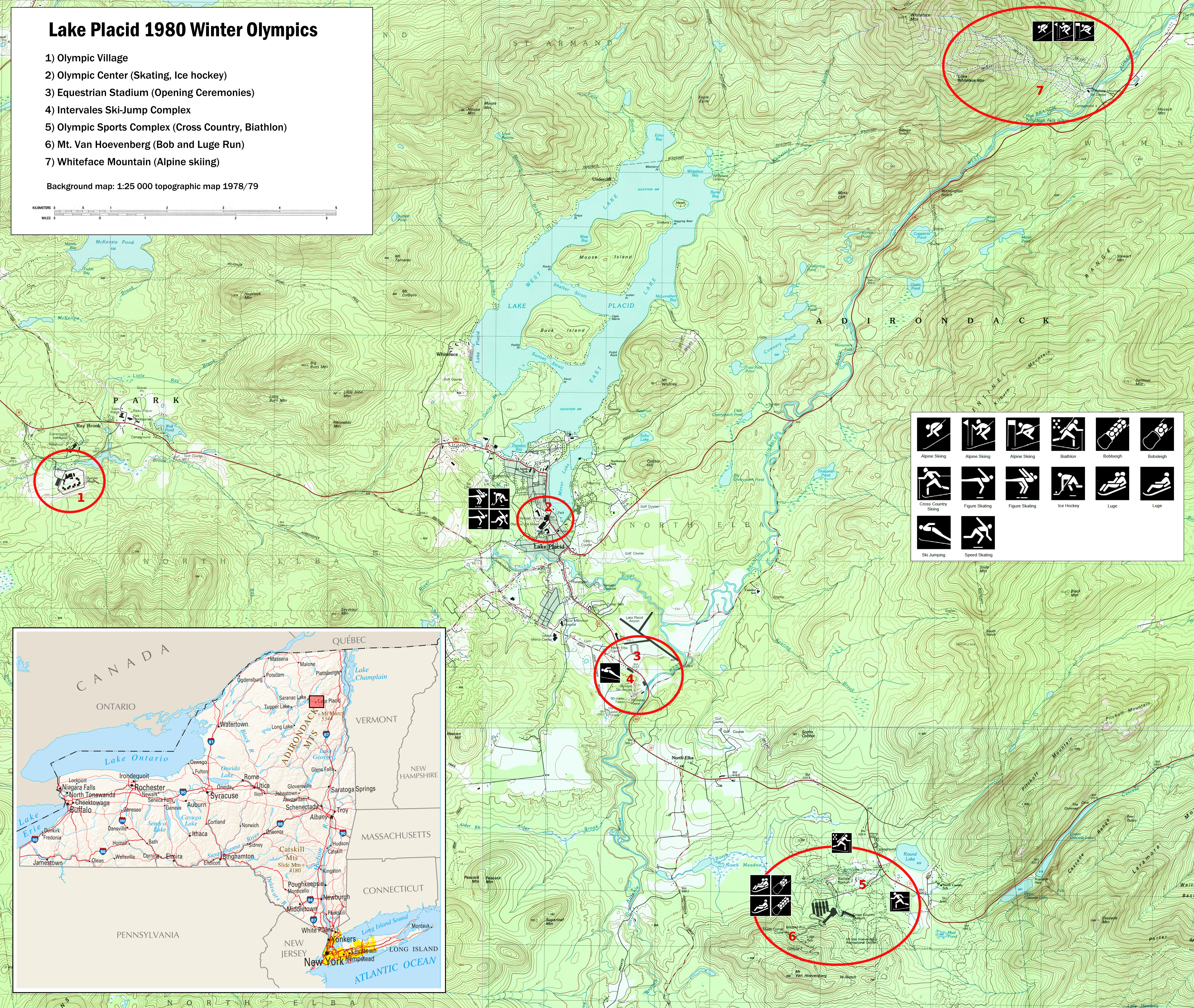
Map of the venues in Lake Placid

- Intervales Ski-Hill – Nordic combined (ski jumping), Ski jumping
- Lake Placid Equestrian Stadium – Opening Ceremony
- Lake Placid Olympic Sports Complex Cross Country Biathlon Center – Biathlon, Cross-country skiing, Nordic combined (Cross-country skiing)
- Mt. Van Hoevenberg Bob and Luge Run – Bobsleigh, Luge (separate tracks)
- Olympic Center – Figure skating, Ice hockey, closing ceremonies
- James B. Sheffield Speed Skating Oval – Speed skating
- Whiteface Mountain – Alpine skiing

The former Will Rogers Memorial Hospital was briefly used as press headquarters.

The site was considered ideal for the available infrastructure from the 1932 Winter Olympics, most notably the Bobsleigh run. The existing facilities meant the Olympics could be staged on a reasonable budget and with limited environmental impact. It was not just a matter of convenience, either, according to Lake Placid's congressman, Representative Robert McEwen. "It is no secret to us in America that the measure of federal support given to athletes in Communist countries (so that they win medals and improve the countries' image abroad) is on a level unknown to us here in America," he told Congress. "This would be a step in the right direction, a worthy investment in American winter athletes."

The local Olympic committee needed congressional approval for funding to build the Olympic Village. Congress required an after-use contract for facilities, and it was agreed that the Olympic Village would be built in accordance to Federal Bureau of Prisons needs. Following the Olympic Games, it was repurposed for Federal Correctional Institution, Ray Brook.

== Medal count ==
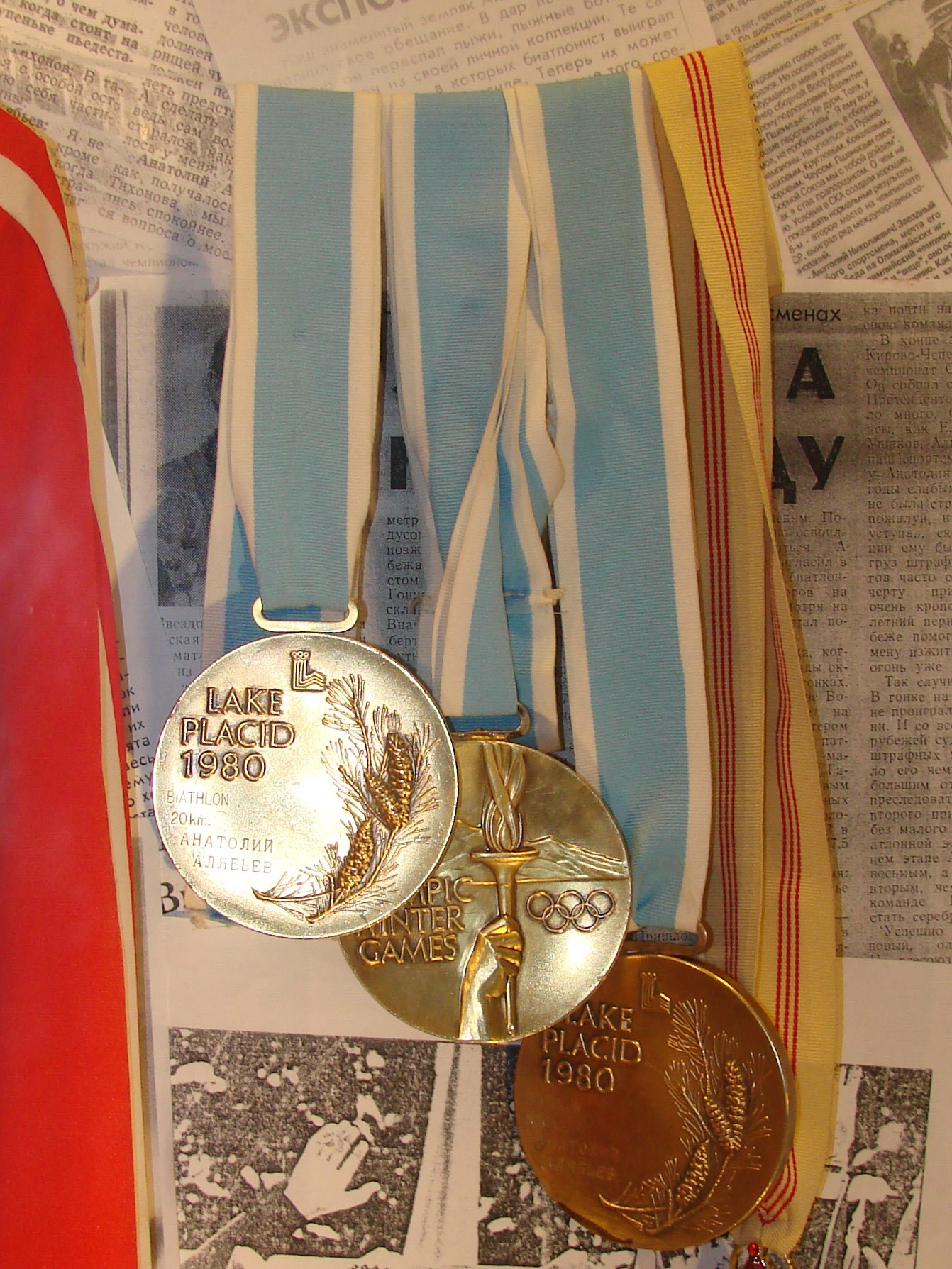
Two gold and bronze Olympic medals from XIII Olympic Winter Games, designed by Gladys Gunzer

These are the top ten nations that won medals at the 1980 Winter Games.

* Host nation (United States)

Rank	Nation	Gold	Silver	Bronze	Total
1	Soviet Union	10	6	6	22
2	East Germany	9	7	7	23
3	United States*	6	4	2	12
4	Austria	3	2	2	7
5	Sweden	3	0	1	4
6	Liechtenstein	2	2	0	4
7	Finland	1	5	3	9
8	Norway	1	3	6	10
9	Netherlands	1	2	1	4
10	Switzerland	1	1	3	5
Totals (10 entries)		37	32	31	100

== Participating nations ==
37 NOCs participated.

Cyprus made its Olympic debut at the games. The People's Republic of China and Costa Rica both made their Winter Olympic debut. The Republic of China refused to attend both the Summer Games in Montreal, the Winter Games in Lake Placid, and the Summer Games in Moscow over the IOC's recognition of the People's Republic of China as "China", and its request for the Republic of China to compete as "Chinese Taipei". The PRC, on the other hand, returned to the Olympics for the first time since 1952 and made its Winter Olympic debut, although it then boycotted the 1980 Moscow Summer Olympics.

Participating National Olympic Committees
- Andorra (3)
- Argentina (13)
- Australia (10)
- Austria (43)
- Belgium (2)
- Bolivia (3)
- Bulgaria (8)
- Canada (59)
- China (24)
- Costa Rica (1)
- Cyprus (3)
- Czechoslovakia (41)
- East Germany (53)
- Finland (52)
- France (22)
- Great Britain (48)
- Greece (3)
- Hungary (2)
- Iceland (6)
- Italy (46)
- Japan (50)
- Lebanon (3)
- Liechtenstein (7)
- Mongolia (3)
- Netherlands (29)
- New Zealand (5)
- Norway (64)
- Poland (30)
- Romania (35)
- South Korea (10)
- Soviet Union (86)
- Spain (8)
- Sweden (61)
- Switzerland (44)
- United States (101) (host)
- West Germany (80)
- Yugoslavia (15)

=== Number of athletes by National Olympic Committees ===
IOC Letter Code	Country	Athletes
USA	United States	101
URS	Soviet Union	86
FRG	West Germany	80
NOR	Norway	64
SWE	Sweden	61
CAN	Canada	59
GDR	East Germany	53
FIN	Finland	52
JPN	Japan	50
GBR	Great Britain	48
ITA	Italy	46
SUI	Switzerland	44
AUT	Austria	43
TCH	Czechoslovakia	41
ROM	Romania	35
POL	Poland	30
HOL	Netherlands	29
CHN	China	24
FRA	France	22
YUG	Yugoslavia	15
ARG	Argentina	12
KOR	South Korea	10
AUS	Australia	10
BUL	Bulgaria	8
ESP	Spain	8
LIE	Liechtenstein	7
ISL	Iceland	6
NZL	New Zealand	5
AND	Andorra	3
BOL	Bolivia	3
CYP	Cyprus	3
GRE	Greece	3
LIB	Lebanon	3
MGL	Mongolia	3
BEL	Belgium	2
HUN	Hungary	2
CRC	Costa Rica	1
Total		1,072

== Mascot ==
Roni was the Olympic mascot of the Games, created by Don Moss. The mascot was a raccoon, which is a familiar animal from the mountainous region of the Adirondacks where Lake Placid is situated. The name Roni came from the word raccoon in Iroquoian, the language of the native people from the region of the State of New York and Lake Placid, and was chosen by Lake Placid school children.

== Theme song ==
The official theme song for the 1980 Winter Olympics was "Give It All You Got" by the American flugelhorn player Chuck Mangione, who performed the song (along with the song "Piña Colada") live at the closing ceremony, with the Hamilton Philharmonic Orchestra (Canada).

== See also ==
- 1980 Winter Paralympics
- 1980 Summer Paralympics
- 1980 Summer Olympics
- Olympic Games held in the United States
  - 1904 Summer Olympics – St. Louis
  - 1932 Summer Olympics – Los Angeles
  - 1932 Winter Olympics – Lake Placid
  - 1960 Winter Olympics – Squaw Valley
  - 1980 Winter Olympics – Lake Placid
  - 1984 Summer Olympics – Los Angeles
  - 1996 Summer Olympics – Atlanta
  - 2002 Winter Olympics – Salt Lake City
  - 2028 Summer Olympics – Los Angeles
  - 2034 Winter Olympics – Salt Lake City
- List of IOC country codes
- Adirondack Railway: provided train service from Utica, New York, to Lake Placid
- 2023 Winter Universiade

== Citations ==
Official reports

- Ed Lewi Associates, Inc (1980). XIII Olympic Winter Games Lake Placid 1980: Final Report (in English and French). Lake Placid (New York): Lake Placid Olympic Organizing Committee. OCLC 71252911.
- Lake Placid 1980 Winter Olympic Games Bid Committee (1974). Lake Placid: United States Candidate for the XIII Winter Olympic Games 1980. International Olympic Committee. OCLC 911739826.

Works cited

- Flyvbjerg, Bent; Stewart, Allison; Budzier, Alexander (2016). "The Oxford Olympics Study 2016: Cost and Cost Overrun at the Games". SSRN Electronic Journal. arXiv:1607.04484. doi:10.2139/ssrn.2804554. S2CID 156794182.
- Grün, Oskar (2004). Taming Giant Projects: Management of Multi-Organization Enterprises. Berlin: Springer-Verlag. ISBN 978-3-642-05982-7.
- Mogore, Christian (1989). Les jardins secrets de Jean-Jacques Rousseau [The great history of the Olympic Winter Games] (in French). Chambéry, Savoie, France: Editions AGRAF. ISBN 2-908240-01-7.
- Monnin, Éric (2014). De Chamonix à Sotchi: Un siècle d'olympisme en hiver [From Chamonix to Vancouver: A Century of Olympism in Winter] (in French). Paris: Éditions Désiris. ISBN 978-2-36403-066-4.
- Vallet, Stéphane (1988). Les Jeux olympiques d'hiver [The Winter Olympics] (in French). Lyon: La Manufacture. ISBN 2-7377-0057-4.
- Wallechinsky, David (2001). The complete book of the Winter Olympics (2002 ed.). Woodstock, N.Y.: Overlook Press. ISBN 1-58567-195-9.
- Wilson, Harold E. (2004). "Lake Placid 1980". In Findling, John E.; Pelle, Kimberly D. (eds.). Encyclopedia of the modern Olympic movement. Westport, Conn.: Greenwood Press. ISBN 0-313-32278-3.

Winter Olympics
Preceded by Innsbruck	XIII Olympic Winter Games; Lake Placid; 1980	Succeeded by Sarajevo
