= Lake Placid Equestrian Stadium =

Equestrian venue in Lake Placid, New York

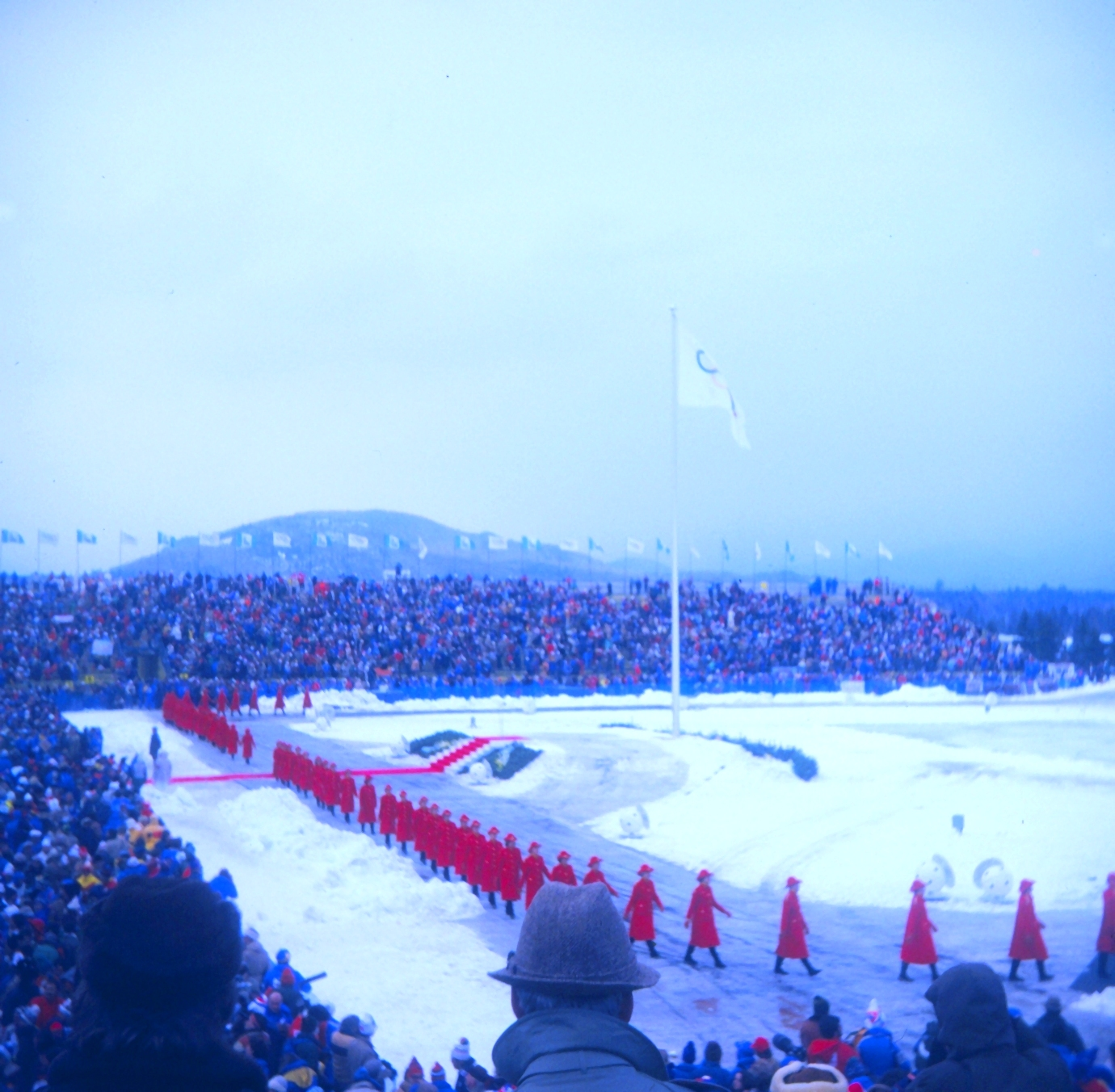
- 1980 Olympic Winter Games opening
- Interactive map of Lake Placid Equestrian Stadium
- Location: Lake Placid, New York, United States
- Coordinates: 44°15′47″N 73°57′53″W
- Capacity: 30,000 (1980 Olympics)
- Surface: Grass

Construction
- Built: 1939
- Opened: 1945 (football); 2003 (equestrian)

Lake Placid Equestrian Stadium is an equestrian stadium in Lake Placid, New York, United States. The opening ceremonies to the 1980 Winter Olympics were organized in a temporary stadium built next to it, which held 30,000 spectators.

== Gallery ==
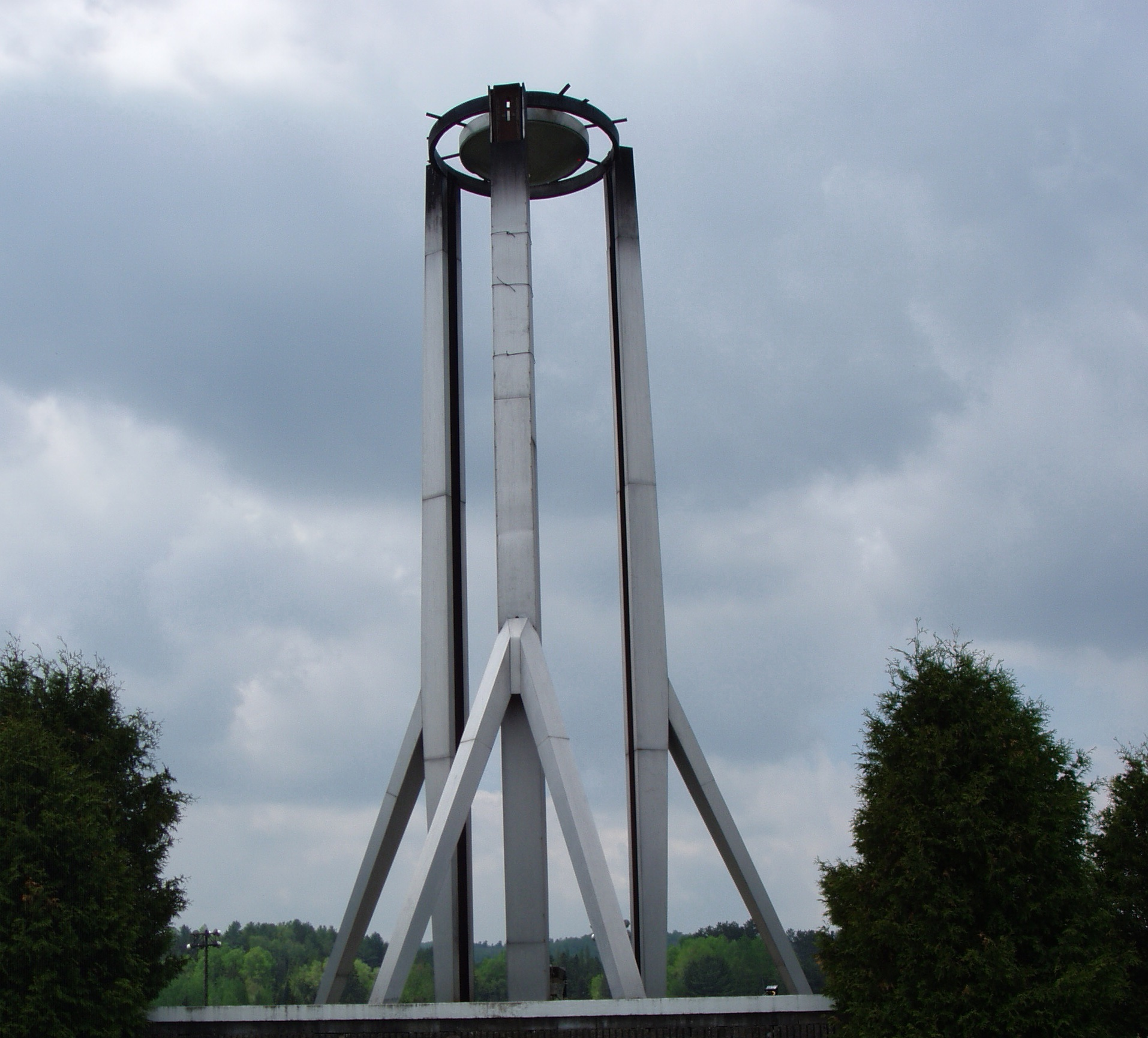
The Olympic Cauldron

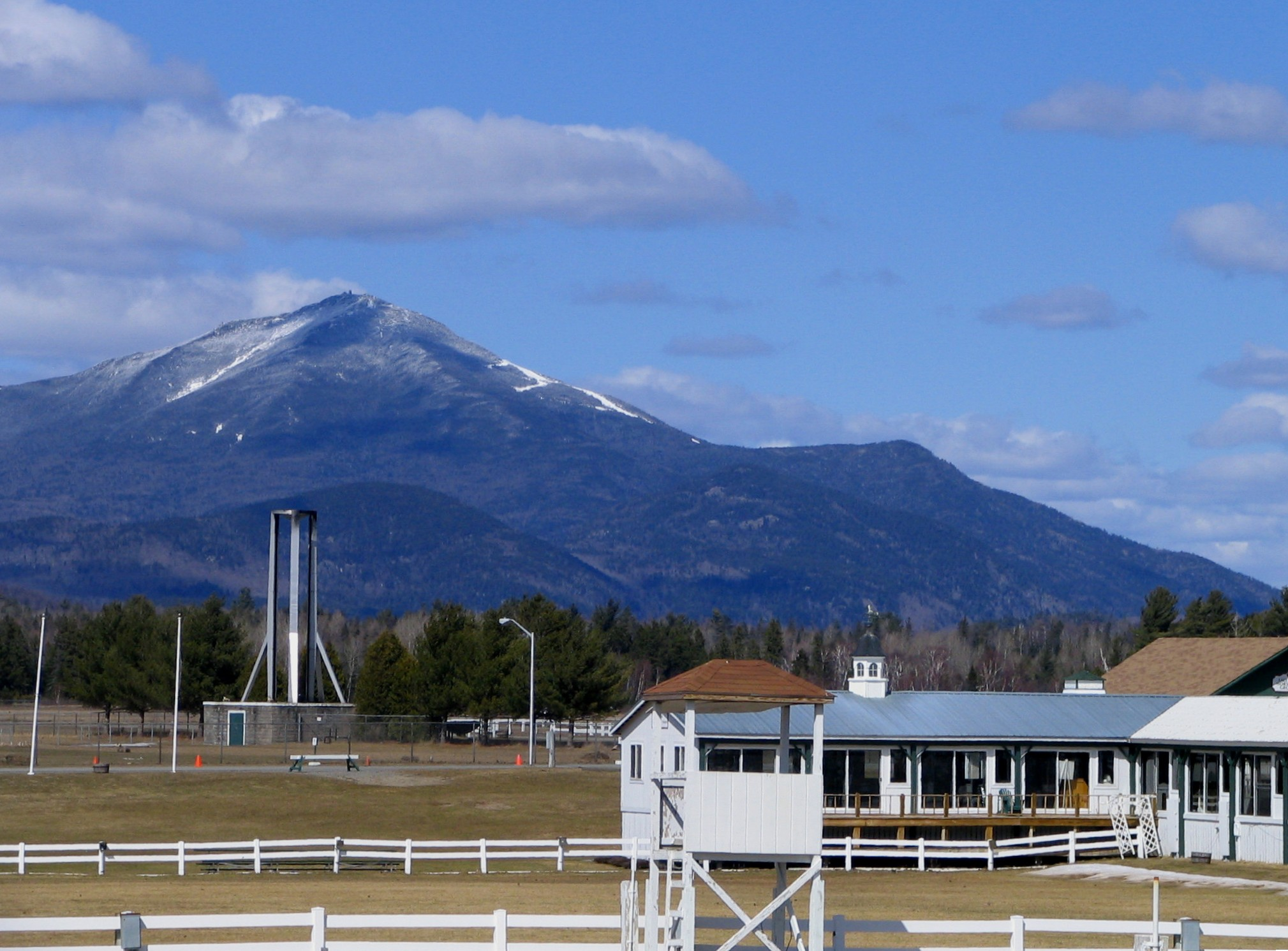
View of the venue with the cauldron

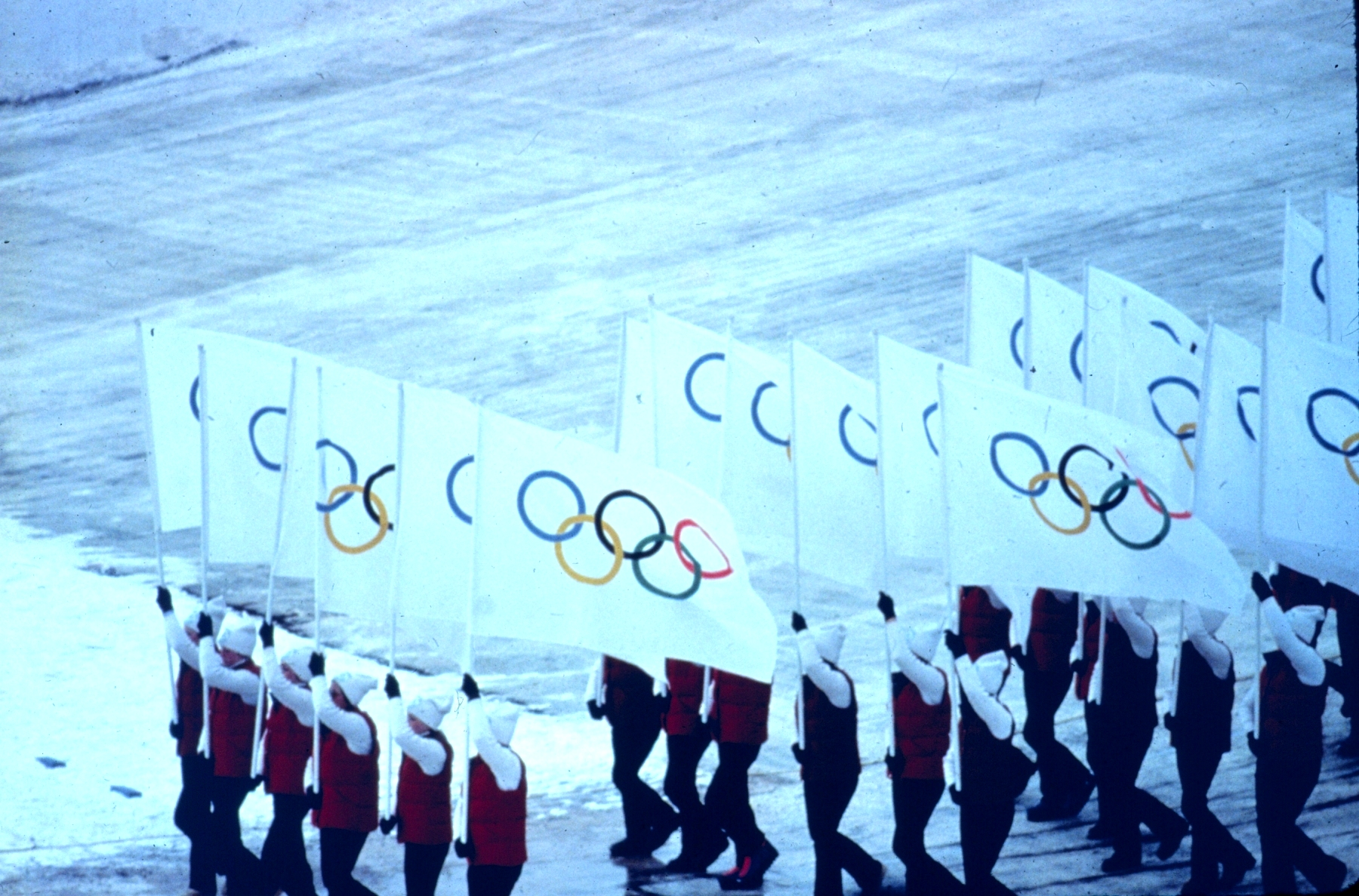
Inside the stadium during the opening ceremony of the 1980 Winter Olympics.
