= Los Angeles bids for the Summer Olympics =

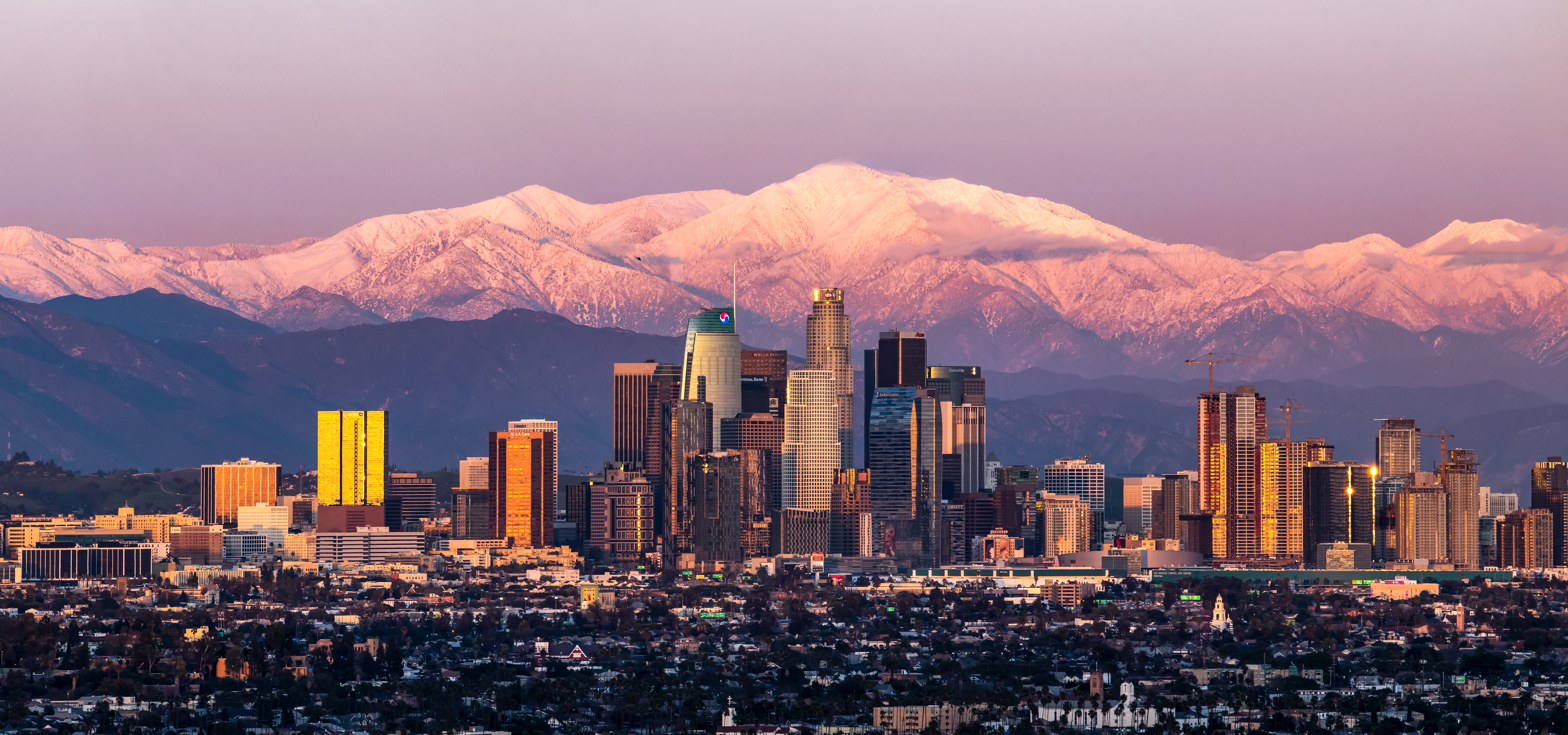
The skyline of Los Angeles

The city of Los Angeles, in the U.S. state of California, has bid to the International Olympic Committee (IOC) to host the Summer Olympic Games 10 times, more than any other city in the world. After the success of its most recent bid, Los Angeles will have hosted the Olympics three times, in 1932, 1984, and 2028. It is thus tied with London and Paris as the city which has hosted the most Olympic Games. However, Los Angeles has never been chosen over a rival candidate in the bidding process. It has only been selected as the host city under atypical circumstances: when it was chosen before any bidding process had begun for 1932, when no other candidates submitted a bid for 1984, and when two cities were the only candidates for either 2024 or 2028.

A movement led by local real estate developer William May Garland advocated for Los Angeles to host the Olympics as early as 1920, and succeeded in bringing the event to the city in 1932. Garland later founded the Southern California Committee for the Olympic Games (SCCOG) in 1939, which has been advocating for the Games to be held in Los Angeles ever since. The city submitted a bid for every Summer Olympics from 1948 to 1984. Beginning with bids for the 1960 Summer Olympics, the U.S. Olympic Committee (USOC) took responsibility for choosing one American city to bid to the IOC for each Games. Los Angeles' bids from 1960 to 1972 were passed over in favor of Detroit, sometimes leading to conflict between the two cities. When Detroit stopped bidding, the USOC nominated Los Angeles as its candidate from 1976 to 1984. After Los Angeles successfully hosted the Olympics in 1984, SCCOG resumed its activities and submitted proposals to host most of the available Summer Olympics from 2004 to 2024. The 2024 bid was the first of these to be approved by the USOC, and led to Los Angeles being awarded hosting rights for the 2028 Summer Olympics by the IOC without contest.

== 1924 and 1928 ==
The Southern California Olympic Games Committee was originally created to organize tryouts for athletes hoping to attend the 1920 Summer Olympics in Antwerp, Belgium. One of these was a track and field meet held at Tournament Park in Pasadena, as a qualification event for athletes going to the U.S. Olympic trials at Harvard Stadium. During a meeting preparing for this event on the evening of June 1, 1920, members discussed the city of Los Angeles' plans for a new large stadium in Exposition Park (which would ultimately become Los Angeles Memorial Coliseum). At the meeting, it was suggested that the stadium could potentially be used as the primary venue for the 1924 Summer Olympics. A column in the previous day's Long Beach Telegram had complained that "from time to time various cities in this country flood the presses with items that their city wants the 1924 Olympic games", and argued that any country which had already hosted an Olympics (as the United States had with the 1904 Summer Olympics in St. Louis) would likely have to wait "fifty years or more" before being awarded another. The committee members countered this argument by saying that past precedents were likely to be broken in the aftermath of World War I.

The idea caught on quickly. On June 3, the Community Development Association, which was partnering with the city to plan and build the stadium, announced that it would send "a delegation of prominent Los Angeles men" to Antwerp to meet with the IOC and advocate for their city as the next Olympic host. William May Garland, a local real estate developer who was the president of the Community Development Association, was one of the leaders of the delegation. The next day, it was reported that Gustavus Town Kirby, the president of the USOC, supported the idea and promised he would "aid in every way possible." Pasadena's planned Rose Bowl stadium, which also had not yet begun construction, was offered as an alternate venue for the Games if Los Angeles' stadium plan fell through.

Garland was joined by his two sons and Robert Weaver, president of the Southern California chapter of the Amateur Athletic Union, on a three-month trip to Antwerp, sailing on the RMS Olympic in July. Garland met with Baron Pierre de Coubertin, who had founded the IOC in 1894 and had been its president ever since. Coubertin and the other members of the IOC were impressed by Garland's presentation, and the minutes of the IOC session recorded that "Mr. Garland from Los Angeles made a brilliant presentation of the city's candidacy." However, Coubertin desired that his own home city of Paris would host in 1924 (although it had previously hosted in 1900) and had already promised the 1928 Summer Olympics to Amsterdam. The final decision was postponed until the next IOC session in Lausanne, Switzerland, in 1921, and Los Angeles' candidacy was filed away alongside 13 other bids, including American bids from Atlantic City, Boston, and Chicago.

In the meantime, the proposal for the Coliseum in Exposition Park depended on a referendum to approve municipal bonds that would fund its construction, scheduled for August 31, 1920. Three days before the vote, Garland and Weaver telegraphed back from Antwerp with an optimistic message: "If citizens vote for bond issues firmly believe world's greatest sporting event will be ours. Urge voters to insure world prominence for their city." This last-minute message to voters was unsuccessful, and the referendum was narrowly defeated. The bond issue needed a two-thirds majority (66.7%) to pass, and only about 65% voted yes.

Returning to Los Angeles in late September, Garland negotiated an alternate funding arrangement to build the Coliseum: the Community Development Association would lease the land from the city, loan money from private banks to fund construction, and then rent the finished stadium back to the city for 10 years before giving joint ownership of the stadium to the city and Los Angeles County. Officials were concerned that this arrangement could violate state law, and they sent a test case to the Supreme Court of California before pursuing it. While waiting for a verdict in this case, Garland was informed by William Milligan Sloane, an American who had been a member of the IOC since its founding, on March 23, 1921, that "protests against assigning the next Olympiad to America have been received from substantially every European country". The next day, Garland wrote to Coubertin to advocate for Los Angeles as a host. Coubertin replied that "the hate of the world is such that the California plan for 1924 seems very hard now to put up", and said that Europeans wanted the 1928 Olympics "within their reach" as well.

The IOC gathered for the 7th Olympic Congress and the 19th IOC Session in Lausanne in June 1921. Coubertin had recently announced his plans to retire after the 1924 Olympics were celebrated, and he urged the committee members to approve his proposals for the 1924 and 1928 Olympics as a parting gift. Up to that point, all Olympic hosts had been approved by a unanimous vote of all committee members. When the host cities were chosen on June 2, the delegations from four countries opposed Coubertin's motion, but both proposals were approved. The candidate cities officially recorded for the 1924 Games were Amsterdam, Barcelona, Los Angeles, Paris, Prague, and Rome. Paris was chosen. The committee's attention then turned to the host for 1928, for which only Amsterdam and Los Angeles were recorded as candidates. Amsterdam was chosen.

Both American delegates to the committee, Sloane and Bartow S. Weeks, were ill and could not attend the session. Gustavus Kirby and his secretary Fred Rubien traveled to Lausanne in their stead. Kirby told Coubertin at the beginning of the session that Los Angeles was still interested in hosting in either 1924 or 1928. The Americans were unaware of the meeting in which the hosts were chosen, and they came to a meeting the next day prepared to present on Los Angeles' behalf, only to be told that the decision had already been made. Coubertin wrote to Garland on June 6 to apologize that he could not decline the city's offer in person, and he offered to let Los Angeles serve as a backup host in the event that political difficulties prevented Paris from holding the Olympics in 1924.

== 1932 ==
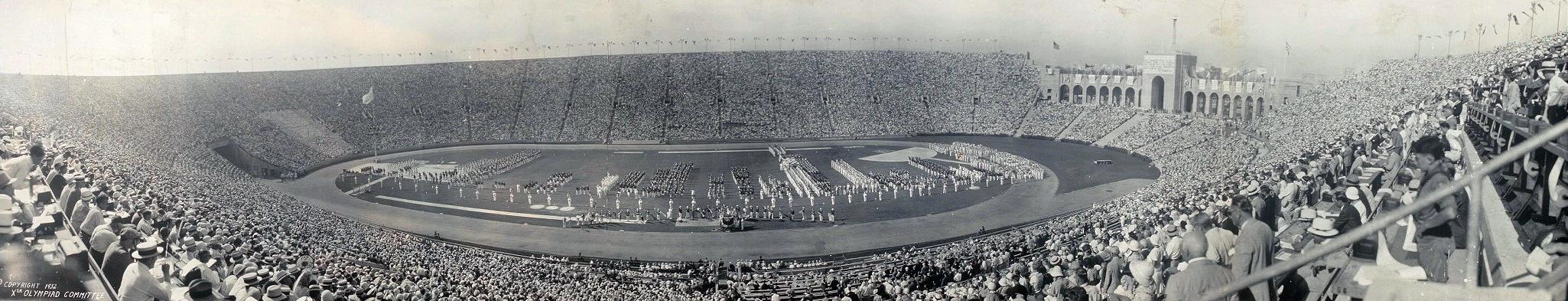
The Opening Ceremony of the 1932 Summer Olympics

In May 1921, the Supreme Court of California ruled that the public-private partnership planning to build the Memorial Coliseum was constitutionally permissible. The contract was signed by the city, the county, and the Community Development Association in November, leasing 15 acres (6.1 ha) of Exposition Park to the latter group. Ground was broken on the stadium the following month, and it was completed on May 1, 1923.

During the stadium's construction, Garland sent Coubertin newspaper clippings about the ongoing progress, as well as renderings of John and Donald Parkinson's design for the finished structure. The two men became friends, and in November 1921, Coubertin offered Garland a seat as a member of the IOC, recently vacated by Allison V. Armour. Garland was officially elected to the IOC on March 17, 1922. Garland used this position to offer Los Angeles again as a potential backup host for either the 1924 or 1928 Olympics. Coubertin grew frustrated with these offers and urged him to instead make a bid for the next available Games, those of 1932.

With the Coliseum nearly finished, Garland traveled to the 21st IOC Session in Rome, which began on April 7, 1923. On the third day of the session, Garland presented Los Angeles' bid for the 1932 Summer Olympics. He argued that the city made an excellent Olympic host not only because of its new stadium, but also because it was far removed from the political turmoil of postwar Europe. The assembled committee members immediately and unanimously moved to award the 1932 Olympics to Los Angeles, without further debate and without considering bids from other cities. The decision was unusual, as those Games were still nine years away and no other city had been given the opportunity to bid for the event. Coubertin wrote in his memoirs that awarding the Olympics to any European city nine years in advance would have been an "obvious imprudence" because of the likelihood of political unrest in that place during the next decade (for instance, Benito Mussolini had become the Fascist leader of the country where they were meeting only a few months earlier), but that "absent some seismic catastrophe, California was not subject to any of the threats looming even then". In telegraphing the news of the decision back home, Garland wrote that Coubertin "told me he saw dark times ahead for Europe. He believes that the Pacific coast, with Los Angeles as the center, is the proper place for the world's meeting of athletes."

== 1940 ==
Hosting duties for the 1940 Summer Olympics were awarded to Tokyo in 1936. The Japanese government backed out of hosting the Olympics in 1938 due to the outbreak of the Second Sino-Japanese War. The Games were then awarded to Helsinki, Finland. When World War II began in Europe in September 1939, it was expected that Finland would also be forced to relinquish hosting duties. USOC chairman Avery Brundage stated on September 18 that the United States could potentially host the Olympics if they were canceled in Finland. In response, William May Garland and Paul H. Helms founded the Southern California Committee for the Olympic Games, which wrote to Brundage on September 20 to offer Los Angeles as a potential host. In reporting on the offer, the Los Angeles Times described SCCOG as being the same athlete-supporting organization which had spawned the first campaign for Los Angeles to host the Olympics in 1920, but the modern-day SCCOG considers 1939 its founding date.

The IOC ignored Los Angeles' proposal and instead briefly entertained using Detroit as an alternate site for the Games. The continued escalation of World War II and the outbreak of the Winter War in Finland forced the Games to be canceled altogether in December 1939. The Memorial Coliseum was scheduled to host the U.S. Olympic trials in track and field in July 1940, and SCCOG suggested turning that event into an "American Olympic Games" to replace the canceled Olympics. The meet was canceled altogether in May.

== 1948 ==
With the end of World War II in 1945, it became possible to plan for the 1948 Summer Olympics. The members of the IOC participated in a postal vote to choose the host city. Los Angeles was one of four American cities to apply for inclusion on the ballot, alongside Baltimore, Minneapolis, and Philadelphia. However, London was favored because it had been awarded the 1944 Summer Olympics in 1939, which were canceled because of the war. It was announced on February 14, 1946, that London had been selected by "the great majority of members".

== 1952 ==
Within a month of the host selection for 1948, the IOC announced in March 1946 that five cities had already submitted bids for the 1952 Summer Olympics, including Los Angeles. The city's bid book emphasized the success of the 1932 Summer Olympics and promised that a repeat event would draw even more spectators from Los Angeles' rapidly growing population.

The bid planned to use existing facilities, ensuring that the Games could be staged at a low cost. One proposed infrastructure improvement that drew controversy from local residents was the addition of automobile parking to the Memorial Coliseum, needed because the existing parking facilities were considered inadequate even for the Coliseum's normal use as a college football stadium. Various proposals were made for adding parking to the site, some of which were expected to cost as much as $21 million (equivalent to $303 million in 2025). Proposals which involved the demolition of nearby residences were particularly controversial, as demand for housing was high in the aftermath of World War II.

The host city for the 1952 Summer Olympics was selected at the 40th IOC Session in Stockholm, on June 21, 1947. Los Angeles mayor Fletcher Bowron and representatives of SCCOG flew to Sweden to present the city's bid. On the first ballot, Los Angeles and Minneapolis tied for second place, with four votes each, while Helsinki received 14 of the 28 votes, one shy of a winning majority. Six of the 10 candidate cities were eliminated after the first round, including the three other American bids from Chicago, Detroit, and Philadelphia. On the second ballot, Los Angeles and Minneapolis gained one vote each for a total of five, but Helsinki also gained one additional vote and was thus awarded the Olympics. After the vote, William May Garland said that "I seriously doubt that the games ever will be held at Helsinki" and offered that "Los Angeles is prepared on six months' notice to take over if this should come about."

== 1956 ==
When the USOC convened for a meeting in New York City on July 28, 1947, Avery Brundage noted that the five American candidates for the 1952 Olympics had collectively received 11 votes in the first round, close to the needed majority of 15. He suggested that it was necessary for the USOC to choose only one city for each Olympics that would submit a bid to the IOC. Representatives from Detroit, Los Angeles, Minneapolis, and Philadelphia all agreed that they would submit their bids for the 1956 Summer Olympics to the USOC and let the organization decide which of their bids would go forward. The USOC appointed a committee which visited all five of the cities that had bid for the 1952 Summer Olympics; Los Angeles was the last of these to receive a visit. The endorsement decision was initially expected by June 15, 1948, but this was delayed until July, shortly before the beginning of the 1948 Summer Olympics in London. Frederick Matthaei, the chair of the Detroit Olympic Committee, blamed Los Angeles for creating the delay because of rumors that the Olympic Association of Southern California had threatened to withhold funding for the American athletes headed to London if Los Angeles was not chosen. On July 11, the USOC announced that it was nominating Detroit as its candidate for 1956.

A week after Detroit was nominated, SCCOG stated that it was continuing the Los Angeles bid for the 1956 Olympics and selected Willis O. Hunter as its next chairman. Paul Helms said that SCCOG did "not think it wise of the American committee to recommend one particular site" and did "not feel bound by the U.S. Committee's decision". At the 42nd IOC Session, which coincided with the 1948 Summer Olympics in London, representatives continued to advocate for Los Angeles as the host in 1956. William May Garland was in poor health and could not attend the Olympics, and he submitted his resignation from the IOC ahead of the meeting. His son John Jewett Garland, who had assisted him during previous sessions, was elected to his seat on the committee, ensuring that there was still a voting member from Los Angeles among the IOC's three American delegates. The elder Garland died two months later.

On March 4, 1949, a month before the IOC was set to choose the host for 1956, the U.S. Senate passed a resolution recognizing and supporting Detroit's bid and no others from the United States. A few days later, Helms announced that he had written to IOC president Sigfrid Edström to reaffirm Los Angeles' bid, predicting that the IOC "probably will not be impressed" by the USOC and the federal government attempting to influence the decision with their endorsement. However, he said that Los Angeles would not send any representatives to present its bid to the IOC other than John Garland, who was authorized to act on SCCOG's behalf while also serving as a member of the IOC itself. When Brundage learned that Los Angeles was still pursuing its bid, he asked SCCOG to withdraw. Garland refused, and furthermore the representatives from Minneapolis announced they would continue their own bid as long as Los Angeles did.

The host city for the 1956 Summer Olympics was selected at the 43rd IOC Session in Rome on April 28, 1949. With Los Angeles and Minneapolis still presenting their bids alongside Detroit's, Brundage asked the IOC to choose one nominee out of six American cities – the three already bidding, plus Chicago, Philadelphia, and San Francisco – and consider only that one nominee alongside the other world cities bidding. Garland supported Brundage's request, saying that the American candidate cities would "avoid any dogfights over the nomination". However, the IOC did not act on this request, and all six American candidates were considered alongside Buenos Aires, Melbourne, Mexico City, and Montreal in the final IOC vote. Brundage said it was "rather embarrassing" that the dispute could not be resolved, while a representative from Melbourne said, "We are very optimistic, and made more so by the fact there are six American entries." Los Angeles received five votes on the first ballot, the same total as the other five American cities put together, and came in fourth place overall. On the second ballot, Los Angeles lost one of its votes and tied with Detroit for third place. On the third ballot, Los Angeles received five votes again and stayed in third place, and the city was eliminated from contention after this. Melbourne was awarded the Games on the fourth ballot.

When there was uncertainty about whether the Australian government would provide the needed financial support for the 1956 Games, both Detroit and Los Angeles volunteered as replacement hosts. The IOC seriously considered moving the event as late as 1955, but the Olympics were successfully hosted in Melbourne, except for the equestrian events, which were moved to Stockholm due to Australia's strict quarantine laws (see 1956 Summer Olympics).

== 1960 ==
Before the end of the Rome session where Melbourne was chosen as host for 1956, John Garland submitted a bid for Los Angeles to host in 1960. While representatives from Detroit and Buenos Aires also said they would definitely bid again, Los Angeles was the only city to formally submit its 1960 bid in Rome. This submission may not have been accepted by the IOC: when Philadelphia and Lausanne later submitted their own 1960 bids in 1952, it was reported that those cities were the first to formally do so, and the Olympic World Library does not have a candidature document on file for Los Angeles 1960.

On January 10, 1950, the USOC board met in Washington, D.C. It voted to ask the IOC to only consider the one American bid that received the USOC's endorsement, and to reprimand Garland for circumventing the committee's previous endorsement on the campaign for 1956. At a meeting of the SCCOG board in September 1951, Paul Helms suggested convening a meeting between representatives of seven cities (Chicago, Detroit, Los Angeles, Minneapolis, New York, Philadelphia, and San Francisco) who would decide amongst themselves which one would be the American candidate for 1960.

While no decision had been made by the USOC or any other body, Helms then flew to the 1952 Summer Olympics in Helsinki to offer Los Angeles as a potential host for the 48th IOC Session in 1953, where the vote to determine the 1960 host was likely to be held. The IOC decided to postpone the host city selection until 1955, and the 1953 session was ultimately held in Mexico City.

The USOC created a special committee to select one American candidate for the 1960 Summer Olympics and one for the 1960 Winter Olympics. Eight cities expressed interest in bidding for the Summer Games. Of these, Houston and Pittsburgh were rumored to be planning a bid, and New York City said that it would present one to the USOC, but none of the three did. The five bids presented to the USOC selection jury at its meeting on November 17, 1954, in Chicago, were from representatives of Chicago, Detroit, Los Angeles, Minneapolis, and Philadelphia. Detroit was recommended by the jury as the candidate city. Los Angeles made no further attempt at bidding for the Games this time, which were ultimately awarded to Rome over Detroit. California's attention was turned to its bid for the 1960 Winter Olympics, which were successfully awarded to the United States in 1955.

== 1964 ==
By the time bidding for the 1964 Summer Olympics began, the IOC had created new rules for candidate cities, requiring each bidder to have the endorsement of its National Olympic Committee as well as its national government, thereby ensuring that only one city from any country could bid at one time. Los Angeles' campaign to host the Olympics resumed in March 1957, when Mayor Norris Poulson wrote to USOC president Kenneth L. "Tug" Wilson to ask that the city be notified when the selection process began for the 1964 Games.

The USOC announced in June 1958 that it would need to submit its nominee to the IOC by December 1, and gave cities interested in the nomination until September 1 to apply. Mayor Poulson said in July that "we intend to explore all of the possibilities in this matter and if we find that conditions justify an invitation from Los Angeles, we shall submit one." The Los Angeles City Council ultimately approved the city's bid on August 28, and a formal invitation was sent to the IOC on September 2. The USOC board met in Chicago on September 6, hearing bids from Chicago, Detroit, and Minneapolis alongside Los Angeles. Detroit was chosen again as the nominee, and it ultimately lost its bid to Tokyo. Frederick Matthaei of Detroit later claimed that John Garland had cast his vote for Tokyo to scuttle Detroit's campaign because he wanted Los Angeles to host in 1968.

== 1968 ==
While fundraising for American athletes headed to Rome in August 1960, the Los Angeles City Council invited the USOC to consider the city as a candidate for the 1968 Summer Olympics. SCCOG began its campaign in October, and Mayor Poulson told the committee that "if the U.S. Olympic Committee promises us a fair deal, we will make a strong bid."

After Detroit's successive failures, support for Los Angeles as the American candidate grew. While attending the 1961 Rose Bowl in Pasadena, California, USOC president Wilson told a Los Angeles Times reporter that Los Angeles was the best qualified city to host the Games in the United States, largely because it would not need to build a new Olympic Stadium. When Moscow, the capital of the Soviet Union, emerged as one of the leading candidates for 1968, John Garland declared that "every vote [USOC delegates] cast for Detroit is a vote for the Iron Curtain", although he predicted that the committee would still choose the doomed city over Los Angeles anyway. Doug Roby, the other American rank-and-file IOC member, continued to favor Detroit. Frederick Matthaei, the leader of Detroit's bid effort, alleged that the city's 1964 bid had been sabotaged by Americans who favored bringing the Olympics to Los Angeles instead of Detroit.

In September 1962, the USOC sent a seven-member Site Committee led by Robert Kane on a tour of nine cities which had expressed interest in hosting the 1968 Summer Olympics: Chicago, Detroit, Los Angeles, New Orleans, New York, Philadelphia, Portland (Oregon), San Francisco, and Washington, D.C. The Site Committee convened in Chicago on October 15 to vote on the recommendation it would give to the USOC board, which would choose the following day which city to endorse to the IOC based on that recommendation. Of the nine cities visited, only Detroit, Los Angeles, Philadelphia, Portland, and San Francisco were considered. Three of the seven Site Committee members were not present, and two of them were replaced by "observers" who voted on their behalf. The resulting six-member committee became deadlocked: three supported Detroit, three supported Los Angeles, and none were willing to budge. Supporters of Los Angeles' candidacy argued that the observers violated USOC bylaws by casting votes, further claiming that Los Angeles would have won if the observers had not voted. Debate continued through the night, and no decision had been reached by 7 a.m. October 16. One of the committee members then changed his vote from Los Angeles to Detroit, giving the city a 4–2 majority, and the USOC board of directors accepted that recommendation. The 37-member board then voted 20–13 to endorse Detroit's candidacy.

The dispute between the two cities did not end with the endorsement vote. Los Angeles supporters, including Memorial Coliseum general manager Bill Nicholas, alleged that the USOC had rigged the process in Detroit's favor. Doug Roby threatened to sue a Los Angeles-based attorney who accused him of circumventing the USOC's constitution and bylaws to get Detroit the nomination. In November 1962, California governor Edmund G. "Pat" Brown asked President John F. Kennedy to intervene and persuade the USOC to choose Los Angeles instead. Eight Michigan congressmen wrote to Kennedy, asking him to disregard Brown's request.

California officials continually pressed the USOC to reconsider its decision, and the committee agreed to hear the objections from Los Angeles at a New York meeting on March 18 and 19, 1963. Philadelphia, Portland, and San Francisco all reactivated their bids before March, turning the USOC meeting into a second vote on the committee's endorsement. The five cities presented their bid materials to the USOC once again in New York, with Detroit having created a new film presentation for the event. Detroit received 32 of the committee's 40 votes, while Los Angeles received only four, Portland two, and Philadelphia and San Francisco one each. Detroit's bid to the IOC was then passed over in favor of Mexico City.

== 1972 ==
The IOC planned to select the host for the 1972 Summer Olympics in 1966, one year earlier than in past cycles, giving the host six years to prepare instead of five. The USOC announced it would choose its nominee in January 1966, and on short notice in November 1965, it sent invitations to cities that had previously "shown interest in being host city", encouraging them to apply. SCCOG acted promptly, announcing that Los Angeles would bid on November 2. At that time, John Garland boasted that IOC president Avery Brundage had told him "that Los Angeles was the only city in the world where the Olympic Games could make any money."

The USOC chose its nominee on January 15, 1966, in a meeting at the Chicago Sheraton. Los Angeles bid against Chicago, Detroit, Philadelphia, and St. Louis. Philadelphia was primarily interested in setting up for a Bicentennial candidacy for 1976. Detroit reused the presentation materials it had shown to the IOC in 1963, while Los Angeles showed a promotional film produced by Walt Disney.

For the first time, the USOC board needed to put the nominee selection to multiple ballots because none of the cities initially received a majority of votes. On the first ballot, Detroit received 18 votes, Los Angeles 15, St. Louis eight, Chicago one, and Philadelphia none. The latter two candidates were eliminated, and on the second ballot Detroit received 21 votes, Los Angeles 16, and St. Louis five. Detroit was still one vote shy of a majority, so St. Louis was removed and the remaining two cities were put to a third ballot. This time, Detroit won over Los Angeles by a vote of 25–17. In the final IOC vote, Munich, West Germany, was chosen as the host city over Detroit.

== 1976 ==
Interest among American cities in bidding for the 1976 Summer Olympics was particularly high because that year marked the United States Bicentennial. The USOC began its selection process in February 1967, less than a year after Munich was chosen to host in 1972, to allow the eventual nominee as much preparation time as possible. Ten cities initially expressed interest in bidding for the 1976 Summer Olympics; of these, the USOC accepted five "qualified bidders" in September 1967: Detroit, Los Angeles, Philadelphia, San Francisco, and the St. Louis suburb of Champ.

Before the USOC could choose a nominee from among the five candidates, Detroit withdrew its bid due to the city's social problems, while Philadelphia's John B. Kelly Jr. admitted that the city was only interested in the Olympics as a backup plan in case it failed to organize a Bicentennial World's Fair. A site selection committee chaired by E. Newbold Black IV visited the three remaining cities in late August and early September, including Champ, which was a sparsely-populated area where developers planned to build the world's largest stadium and which was not considered in the final USOC vote. The USOC selected its nominee for the Games on September 8, 1968, at a meeting in Chicago. The board ultimately voted 28–12 to choose Los Angeles over San Francisco.

In January 1968, Los Angeles mayor Sam Yorty announced the creation of a 1976 Olympic Bid Committee, which he said would work closely with SCCOG to promote the city's bid. After the city was chosen as the U.S. nominee, the city's Los Angeles 1976 Olympic Committee (LAOOC) was tasked with organizing the city's bid to the IOC. The committee's members included all 15 Los Angeles city councilmen, allowing them to take expenses-paid trips to Mexico City to attend the 1968 Summer Olympics in October, making it impossible for the body to reach a quorum back home.

John J. Garland, the former president of SCCOG and the only IOC voting member from Los Angeles, died on November 30, 1968. SCCOG had not been given the opportunity to bid to the IOC since 1949, and its role in the campaign for 1976 was limited. During 1969, SCCOG's acting president Lee Combs Jr. and LAOOC president John Kilroy sparred over the responsibility of organizing the Los Angeles bid. Combs complained to IOC president Avery Brundage that SCCOG, not LAOOC, was the legitimate representative of the city's bid. Brundage did not intervene in the dispute.

LAOOC sought the support of the Nixon administration, which took an interest in the bidding process because Moscow, the capital of the Soviet Union, was one of the other candidates. Nixon and his chief of staff H. R. Haldeman incorrectly believed that the voting members of the IOC were representatives of their home countries and answered to their governments, so they tasked White House aide Charles Stuart with convincing various governments to support Los Angeles' candidacy. Stuart directly influenced at least two IOC members from Panama and Peru by offering to pay for training sessions for sporting officials from those countries.

Los Angeles advertised that it already had "virtually every facility necessary to stage the 21st Olympiad", specifically highlighting that it had hosted the United States Olympic trials in 11 sports during the summer of 1968. The only new venues which LAOOC planned to build for 1976 would have been located in the Sepulveda Basin Recreation Area, a 25,000-seat enclosed aquatics stadium and a shooting range. The location of the Olympic Village was not determined, but the city's bid materials stated it would have been "close to the unique downtown Freeway complex" and divided into seven "neighborhoods" for each of the "basic groupings of nations competing in the Games."

The host city for the 1976 Summer Olympics was selected at the 69th IOC Session in Amsterdam, the Netherlands, on May 12, 1970. Los Angeles competed alongside Moscow and Montreal. On the first ballot, Los Angeles received the fewest votes and was eliminated from contention. On the second ballot, Montreal prevailed over Moscow and was chosen as the host. At the same meeting, Denver was chosen as the host of the 1976 Winter Olympics. The IOC was reluctant to give both events to the same country, hurting Los Angeles' chances but also helping Denver against Vancouver, which had been considered the front-runner to host the 1976 Winter Olympics.

Kilroy attributed the loss of both Los Angeles and Moscow to the IOC's desire to avoid placing the Olympics in either of the two superpowers of the Cold War, despite (in Kilroy's opinion) Montreal being the least qualified of the three to host. Brundage said that the decision was caused by "anti-United States propaganda", and particularly by the global reaction to the Kent State shootings which occurred the week before the vote. Combs said that the conflict between SCCOG and LAOOC had damaged Los Angeles' reputation in the eyes of IOC members and predicted that the city would not host again for decades to come. Additionally, LAOOC's presentation to the IOC was regarded by many members as incompetent and amateurish.

== 1980 ==
Mayor Yorty began unofficially campaigning for Los Angeles to host the 1980 Summer Olympics when he traveled to Munich for the 1972 Summer Olympics. The Munich massacre at those Games, combined with the Tlatelolco massacre immediately before the 1968 Summer Olympics in Mexico City, made many cities reluctant to submit bids for future Olympics. In November 1972, a Colorado ballot measure approving the use of state funds to construct venues for the 1976 Winter Olympics failed, forcing Denver to relinquish those Games and damaging the standing of the United States in international sport. The USOC sent inquiries to 40 American cities about potentially bidding for the 1980 Summer Olympics, and Los Angeles was the only city that expressed interest. As a result, it was chosen unanimously as the American nominee to bid for the Games during a USOC meeting in New York on November 17, 1973.

No cities other than those which had bid for 1976 joined the process, so Los Angeles and Moscow were the only two candidates. Meanwhile, the only city which submitted any bid for the 1980 Winter Olympics was Lake Placid, New York. The host cities for both Games were selected at the 75th IOC Session in Vienna, Austria, on October 13, 1974. Lake Placid was chosen unanimously, while both candidates for the Summer Olympics made IOC members reluctant. Moscow had recently hosted the 1973 Summer Universiade, successfully but with some controversies such as the alleged harassment of Israeli athletes by Soviet Ground Forces troops. There were also concerns that Soviet authorities would interfere with the ability of journalists to report from the Olympics. However, choosing Los Angeles would have given both Games to the same country and would have made the IOC appear to favor NATO over the Warsaw Pact. After the ballots were cast, the IOC did not disclose the number of votes received by each city and simply announced that Moscow had been chosen. Later sources have reported that Moscow was chosen over Los Angeles by a vote of 39–20.

== 1984 ==
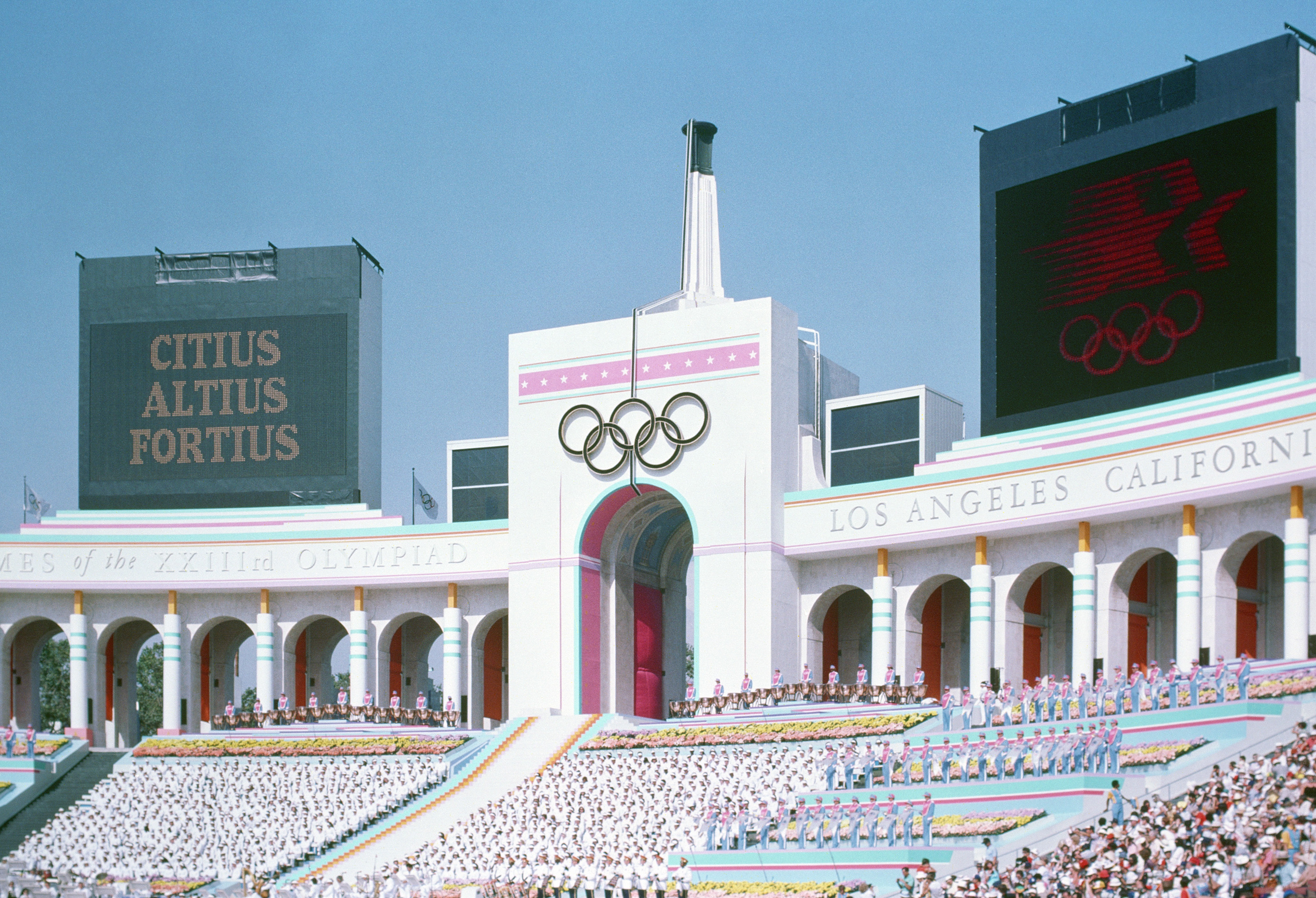
The Opening Ceremony of the 1984 Summer Olympics

In renewing its bid for the 1984 Summer Olympics, Los Angeles faced competition from New York City and Atlanta. The New York proposal was initially viewed as a longshot, given Los Angeles' experience with the IOC, but a promise by the state of New York to cover up to $250 million in costs swayed many USOC members. The New York bid centered on the use of Shea Stadium as the main venue for the Games, but there were doubts as to whether the New York Mets would actually be willing to temporarily vacate their stadium during the regular season for the event. Atlanta withdrew its bid in July 1977, lacking the support of local government and business leaders. Boston, Chicago, and New Orleans briefly entertained their own bids, but did not pursue them. On September 25, 1977, the USOC executive board met at its Colorado Springs headquarters to choose the U.S. candidate for 1984. By an unexpectedly close vote of 55–39, Los Angeles was chosen over New York.

=== Unopposed bid ===
At the international level, the only competition faced by Los Angeles was Tehran, Iran, which had submitted a bid in 1975. However, due to the unrest which ultimately became the Iranian Revolution, the Iranian government neither campaigned for the Olympics nor withdrew its bid. Shortly after receiving the USOC nomination, representatives of Los Angeles attended the Global Association of International Sports Federations convention in Monaco and began negotiating with the leaders of the 44 sports federations. Los Angeles said that it would organize a "Spartan" Olympics at low cost by using as many existing facilities as possible, rather than building lavish new facilities as Munich and Montreal recently had. Anton Calleia, who represented Mayor Tom Bradley in the negotiations, summarized the city's offer as "Take it or leave it."

While many federation leaders accepted this, IOC president Michael Morris, 3rd Baron Killanin stated he was "surprised, to say the least," that Los Angeles was negotiating as though it had already been awarded the Olympics and stressed that "even if Los Angeles is the only applicant, it doesn't mean the Games will automatically go there." When the IOC stopped accepting new applications from potential host cities on November 1, 1977, Los Angeles was the only candidate in the running. Killanin said that no other city had bid because they were "frightened by the exaggerated statements" about the debts incurred by Munich and Montreal.

Hosting the Olympics in Los Angeles was a broadly popular idea among local residents, but most Angelenos opposed the use of taxpayer money at the city or county level to fund any part of the Games. This paired well with the city's plan to use as many existing facilities as possible, but the issue of the Olympic Village sparked debate. Mayor Bradley, whose office was responsible for answering such questions from the IOC, preferred to use the existing dormitories at the University of Southern California and UCLA to house athletes. Other city officials advocated for the construction of a permanent new complex which could be converted into all-income housing after the Games. The purpose-built complex would have cost between $100 and $300 million (equivalent to $310–930 million in 2025) and likely would have required at least some public funding to complete, but it would have simplified transportation for athletes and created a lasting benefit for the city. Bradley's office wrote a detailed response to the IOC's questionnaire for host city candidates, which said that the dormitories would be used as the Olympic Village and that no public money would be permitted for Village construction. In January 1978, the City Council approved Bradley's questionnaire response, but it made some changes in doing so. One of these was to specify that a new Olympic Village could potentially be built "should funds other than city funds be available".

SCCOG and the city government of Los Angeles, this time working closely together, proposed a different funding model for the Olympics than that which previous host cities had used. They offered no public money and refused to accept the standard requirement that the government of the host city must take responsibility for any leftover debts. Instead, all funding would be provided by private organizations, and their costs would be repaid by the revenues earned from worldwide television broadcasts of the event. Accordingly, Los Angeles said it would keep all broadcasting revenues for itself, when a large portion of that money had historically gone to the IOC.

These demands infuriated Killanin, as the Olympic Charter required host cities to accept the financial liability of hosting. However, Monique Berlioux, the executive director of the IOC, told a representative for Los Angeles that the IOC was willing to make some limited exceptions to the requirements of the Charter. In April 1978, the month before a final decision was to be made on the hosts for both the 1984 Summer and Winter Olympics, the involved parties met for a summit in Mexico City. There, Los Angeles agreed to share a portion of broadcasting revenues but asserted that it had "veto power over any decision which could increase the cost of the 1984 Games." Killanin was dissatisfied with this compromise. The week before the selection vote, he told committee members that "the IOC must not cede to this kind of pressure" and assured them that if Los Angeles was rejected, either Mexico City, Munich, or Montreal could be called in as a replacement host (having hosted the 1968, 1972, and 1976 Summer Olympics, respectively).

During the 80th IOC Session in Athens, Greece, beginning May 12, 1978, the Los Angeles bidders insisted that they would not accept any financial liability. With no progress being made in the negotiations, Mayor Bradley offered a compromise on May 16, saying that the city could purchase insurance policies that would cover any potential losses from the Games. The mayor told reporters on May 17 that he expected to fly back to Los Angeles and finalize the details of this insurance policy before the IOC decided whether to award the Games to Los Angeles or not. However, on May 18, the IOC voted unanimously to provisionally award the Olympics to Los Angeles, emphasizing the condition that the city must sign the standard, unmodified host city contract no later than July 31, 1978. The contract required all host cities to accept "complete financial responsibility for the organization of the games".

=== Negotiations with the IOC ===
In the meantime, Mayor Bradley needed the city council to approve his proposal for an insurance policy, and councilmembers were deeply divided on the issue. Several members said that a referendum should be held in November 1978 to decide whether to accept the contract or not. Another referendum, the statewide Proposition 13, passed on June 6, blocking property tax increases and making it difficult for California to institute new taxes. The success of this "revolt" against taxation cast doubt on any proposal for the Olympics which involved taxpayer money.

Negotiations between the IOC and Los Angeles continued at in a summit in Montreal on June 19. No progress was made during the six-hour meeting. With the deadline approaching and no agreement in sight, Bradley announced on July 11 that he would withdraw the city's bid unless the IOC released it from financial liability. On July 18, Killanin rejected the city's ultimatum, and so Bradley asked the city council to withdraw the bid.

As the tradition demands,IOC considered giving the Olympics to a recent host such as Munich or Montreal, both cities were reluctant to even consider the possibility of hosting again. Willi Daume, who had been chief organizer of the 1972 Summer Olympics, said that Munich would host again only "if no other city in the world came forward" and that "only in case of an emergency for the Olympic movement, would we even agree to study the situation." Iona Campagnolo, Canada's Minister of State for Fitness and Amateur Sport, said that it would be irresponsible for Montreal to host again when it had not finished paying its debts from the 1976 Summer Olympics, and that the tax-cutting spirit behind "Proposition 13 is as alive and well in Canada as it is in Los Angeles." New York City, which had lost the USOC nomination, was more willing to step in, but the USOC remained committed to Los Angeles as its candidate.

With no alternative at hand, on July 19, Killanin extended the deadline until August 21 and offered to resume negotiations with Los Angeles. On July 27, USOC president Robert J. Kane suggested a compromise, in which the USOC would indemnify the city in the event of any losses, but this was promptly rejected by Bid Committee. A few hours later, Kane offered to have the USOC accept all financial liability in place of the city, which was more positively received by the city government. USOC treasurer William Simon said that the committee was willing to accept this risk because the Games' low-cost plans ensured that "it will not become another Montreal."

Killanin accepted this offer. At a meeting in Lausanne, Switzerland, on August 31, the IOC executive committee unanimously agreed to put the modified contract to a postal vote to the all IOC members. The postal vote concluded on October 7, approving the contract by a margin of 74–3 (with 8 members abstaining). Some members of the Los Angeles city council still opposed the Games on the grounds that the city would be responsible for security and policing during the event. The council ratified the modified contract on October 12 by a vote of 8–4 (with 3 members absent).

There was a brief conflict over where the host city contract should be signed, with the IOC wanting the signing ceremony to take place at its Lausanne headquarters and Mayor Bradley preferring to do it in Los Angeles. President Jimmy Carter ofered to host the ceremony at the Roosevelt Room of the White House. The contract was signed there by Killanin and Bradley on October 20, and the Olympic torch at the Memorial Coliseum was lit at the same time. Carter was expected to attend the ceremony, but instead he remained in the Oval Office speaking with ambassador-at-large Alfred Atherton about the ongoing Egypt–Israel peace treaty talks.

The ban on public funding for the Olympics was further guaranteed by Proposition N, a ballot question which amended the Los Angeles city charter to prohibit the use of municipal funds as part of the Games. Proposition N was passed on November 7, 1978, with 73 percent of the vote. The bidding committee of the 1984 Summer Olympics was subsequently turned over to the Los Angeles Olympic Organizing Committee, which in 1979 chose Peter Ueberroth as its president, who ultimately became the face of the Games' organization.

== 2004 ==
On June 18, 1985, less than a year after Los Angeles successfully hosted the 1984 Summer Olympics, SCCOG announced that it would pursue a long-term bid to host the 2004 Summer Olympics. SCCOG president John C. Argue, who had participated in the negotiations to get the 1984 Games, reasoned that Athens was likely to get the centennial Olympics in 1996 and Beijing was already considered the front-runner for 2000. However, the 1996 Summer Olympics were actually awarded to Atlanta, forcing Los Angeles to delay its plans because it was unlikely that the U.S. would host three Summer Games in a 20-year span.

== 2008 ==
While several American cities were considering a bid for the 2008 Summer Olympics as of 1997, Los Angeles was not one of them. John Argue told the Los Angeles Times that "we're not making a bid for 2008 because we think it's a dead loser", and informed the USOC that the city planned to bid for the 2012 Summer Olympics instead. Those cities that did approach the USOC with bids for 2008 were told that they should apply for 2012 or for the 2007 Pan American Games instead.

== 2012 ==
The USOC set a deadline of October 20, 1997, for all cities interested in a 2012 bid to submit an application, beginning an unprecedented eight-year process before the IOC would choose a host city in 2005. Los Angeles was one of 10 American cities to apply, submitting a deposit of $150,000 (equivalent to $300,000 in 2025) to the USOC a few days before the deadline. The USOC initially told these candidates that it would choose a bid to send to the IOC in late 2000, giving that city five years on the world stage before the selection. However, when the USOC board unanimously voted to pursue a 2012 bid in a meeting in Orlando on November 2, 1997, it was also decided that the nomination of the U.S. candidate city would be pushed back to the fall of 2002.

A site selection committee visited all candidate cities during the summer of 2001. On October 26, 2001, at a meeting in Salt Lake City, the USOC chose four of the remaining eight candidates to be shortlisted for further consideration. Los Angeles was not one of the cities on the shortlist. Ultimately, the USOC selected New York City's bid as its nominee in 2002. New York lost to London when the IOC chose the host in 2005.

== 2016 ==
Immediately after New York City lost its bid to host the 2012 Summer Olympics on July 6, 2005, USOC chair Peter Ueberroth announced that a new and more transparent process would be used to select the U.S. candidate city for the 2016 Summer Olympics, with New York not being given an advantage over other cities if it chose to bid again. In October 2005, Ueberroth said that the USOC was uncertain about submitting any bid for 2016, believing that the country needed to rethink its approach to avoid seeming "arrogant" in its dealings with the IOC.

Los Angeles was one of five cities to submit a bid for 2016. While the USOC still had not decided whether to support any American bid for the Games, a USOC delegation led by Ueberroth visited all five candidate cities in May 2006. In July, Los Angeles was chosen as one of the three finalists alongside Chicago and San Francisco. However, Ueberroth said that none of the three cities were yet ready to submit a bid to the IOC, and that "if we do not believe a U.S. city can be competitive, we will not bid".

San Francisco withdrew its bid in November 2006 after its plan for a new stadium at Candlestick Point fell through. In January 2007, the USOC confirmed that it would advance a bid to the IOC with either Chicago or Los Angeles. The final stage of the USOC internal selection occurred on April 14, 2007, at Washington, D.C.'s Embassy Row Hotel, where Chicago was chosen over Los Angeles. The vote totals were not disclosed. Chicago's bid was eliminated on the first ballot when the IOC voted in 2009, and the 2016 Games were awarded to Rio de Janeiro.

== 2024 and 2028 ==
Los Angeles expressed interest in hosting the 2024 Summer Olympics as early as February 2013. In March 2013, Mayor Antonio Villaraigosa sent a letter to the USOC stating that the city was interested in bidding to host the 2024 Olympic Games. On September 17, 2013, the LA County Board of Supervisors unanimously approved a resolution seeking interest in the Games.

In June 2014, the USOC chose four cities for further consideration. Los Angeles was shortlisted alongside Boston, San Francisco, and Washington. On January 8, 2015, the USOC chose Boston's bid as the U.S. candidate to host the 2024 Summer Olympics. However, the bid faced substantial opposition from Boston residents, and the city's nomination was revoked on July 27, 2015, after Boston's mayor refused to sign a contract with the USOC unless it could be guaranteed that public money would not be needed to fund the Games.

In the USOC's second bid selection process, Los Angeles was considered the frontrunner over San Francisco and Washington as early as the day after Boston's withdrawal. On August 12, USOC chief executive Scott Blackmun stated that negotiations were well underway with Los Angeles. On September 1, the LA City Council voted 15–0 to support a bid for the 2024 Olympic Games. The USOC finalised its selection moments after the LA City Council's vote.

After the withdrawal of other candidates, Los Angeles became one of only two cities bidding for the 2024 Summer Olympics, the other being Paris. As a result, the IOC decided on July 11, 2017, that it would award the 2024 Games to one candidate and the 2028 edition to the other. Through discussions between the two bid committees and the IOC, it was agreed that Paris would host in 2024 and Los Angeles in 2028, and this was made official on July 31.

== Comparison of venues ==
Sport	Venues used, 1932	1976 bid, 1970	1980 bid, 1974	1984 bid, 1978	Venues used, 1984	2024 bid, 2016	Venues used, 2028 (as of 2026)
Archery	—		Sepulveda Basin Recreation Area		El Dorado Park	Bunker Hill	Dignity Health Sports Park
Athletics (track and field)	Los Angeles Memorial Coliseum						
Badminton	—					Galen Center	
Baseball	—				Dodger Stadium	—	Dodger Stadium
Basketball	—	Los Angeles Memorial Sports Arena			The Forum	Crypto.com Arena	Intuit Dome (5x5); Sepulveda Basin Recreation Area (3x3)
Boxing	Olympic Auditorium	The Forum			Los Angeles Memorial Sports Arena	Los Angeles Convention Center	Crypto.com Arena
Boxing preliminaries	—	The Forum		Grand Olympic Auditorium	—		Peacock Theater
Canoeing (sprint)	—	Long Beach Marine Stadium	Sepulveda Basin Recreation Area		Lake Casitas		Long Beach Marine Stadium
Canoeing (slalom)	—					Sepulveda Basin Recreation Area	Riversport OKC
Cricket	—						Fairplex
Cycling (track)	Rose Bowl	Encino Velodrome		Undetermined	Olympic Velodrome	VELO Sports Center	
Diving	Los Angeles Swimming Stadium	Sepulveda Basin Recreation Area		Belmont Plaza Pool in Long Beach or Los Angeles Swimming Stadium	Olympic Swim Stadium	BMO Stadium	Rose Bowl Aquatics Center
Equestrian	Los Angeles Memorial Coliseum and Riviera Country Club	Griffith Park		Griffith Park or Santa Anita Park	Santa Anita Park and Fairbanks Ranch Country Club	Sepulveda Basin Recreation Area	Santa Anita Park
Fencing	160th Regiment State Armory	California State College, Los Angeles		Long Beach Convention Center		Los Angeles Convention Center	
Field hockey	Los Angeles Memorial Coliseum	Rancho Cienega Park		Drake Stadium, Murdock Stadium, or Rancho Cienega Park	Weingart Stadium	North Athletic Field	Dignity Health Sports Park
Flag football	—						BMO Stadium
Football (soccer)	—	Drake Stadium	Weingart Stadium	Rose Bowl			
Football preliminaries	—			Los Angeles Memorial Coliseum; Veterans Memorial Stadium; Weingart Stadium	Harvard Stadium; Navy–Marine Corps Memorial Stadium; Stanford Stadium	Undetermined	Energizer Park; Etihad Park; Geodis Park; PayPal Park; ScottsMiracle-Gro Field; Snapdragon Stadium
Golf	—					Griffith Park	Riviera Country Club
Gymnastics	Los Angeles Memorial Coliseum	Pauley Pavilion				The Forum	Crypto.com Arena
Handball	—		Pauley Pavilion	Pauley Pavilion or Anaheim Arena	Titan Gymnasium	Los Angeles Convention Center	Long Beach Arena
Judo	—	California State College, Long Beach	Shrine Auditorium and Expo Hall	California State University, Los Angeles	Eagle's Nest Arena	Los Angeles Convention Center	
Lacrosse	—						BMO Stadium
Modern pentathlon	Sunset Fields Golf Club; Also see Equestrian, Fencing, Shooting, and Swimming	Griffith Park	Elysian Park	See Athletics, Equestrian, Fencing, Shooting, and Swimming	Coto de Caza; Heritage Park Aquatic Center (swimming)	Sepulveda Basin Recreation Area	
Rowing	Long Beach Marine Stadium		Sepulveda Basin Recreation Area		Lake Casitas		Long Beach Marine Stadium
Rugby sevens	—					Dignity Health Sports Park	
Shooting	Los Angeles Police Pistol Range	Sepulveda Basin Recreation Area	Whittier Narrows Recreation Area	Angeles Shooting Range; Los Angeles Police Academy; San Gabriel Valley Gun Club; Whittier Narrows	Prado Regional Park	Sepulveda Basin Recreation Area	Long Beach Convention Center and Whittier Narrows
Softball	—						Devon Park
Squash	—						Universal Studios Lot
Surfing	—						Trestles
Swimming	Los Angeles Swimming Stadium	Sepulveda Basin Recreation Area		Dodger Stadium or Sepulveda Basin Recreation Area	Olympic Swim Stadium	BMO Stadium	SoFi Stadium
Synchronized swimming/Artistic swimming	—			Belmont Plaza Pool in Long Beach or East Los Angeles College	Olympic Swim Stadium	BMO Stadium	Long Beach Convention Center
Table tennis	—					Los Angeles Convention Center	
Taekwondo	—					Galen Center	Los Angeles Convention Center
Tennis	—				Los Angeles Tennis Center	Dignity Health Sports Park	
Volleyball	—	Long Beach Arena				Pauley Pavilion	Honda Center
Volleyball preliminaries	—			Long Beach City College	—		
Beach volleyball	—					Santa Monica State Beach	Alamitos Beach
Water polo	Los Angeles Swimming Stadium	Sepulveda Basin Recreation Area		Los Angeles Swimming Stadium	Raleigh Runnels Memorial Pool	Los Angeles Tennis Center	Long Beach Convention Center
Weightlifting	Olympic Auditorium	Shrine Auditorium and Expo Hall			Albert Gersten Pavilion	Peacock Theater	
Wrestling	Olympic Auditorium	Pauley Pavilion	Los Angeles Convention Center	The Forum	Anaheim Convention Center	Los Angeles Convention Center	
Wrestling preliminaries	—			Pasadena Center Exhibition Building	—		
Yachting/Sailing	—	Undetermined	Marina del Rey	Port of Los Angeles and Port of Long Beach	Long Beach Shoreline Marina	Los Angeles Waterfront	Port of Los Angeles and Belmont Veterans Memorial Pier
Opening and closing ceremonies	Los Angeles Memorial Coliseum						Los Angeles Memorial Coliseum and SoFi Stadium
Sport	Venues used, 1932	1976 bid, 1970	1980 bid, 1974	1984 bid, 1978	Venues used, 1984	2024 bid, 2016	Venues used, 2028 (as of 2025)

== See also ==
- United States bids for the Olympic Games
- Detroit bids for the Summer Olympics
- Lake Placid bids for the Winter Olympics
- Salt Lake City bids for the Winter Olympics
- Anchorage bids for the Winter Olympics
- Sports in Los Angeles
