= Detroit bids for the Summer Olympics =

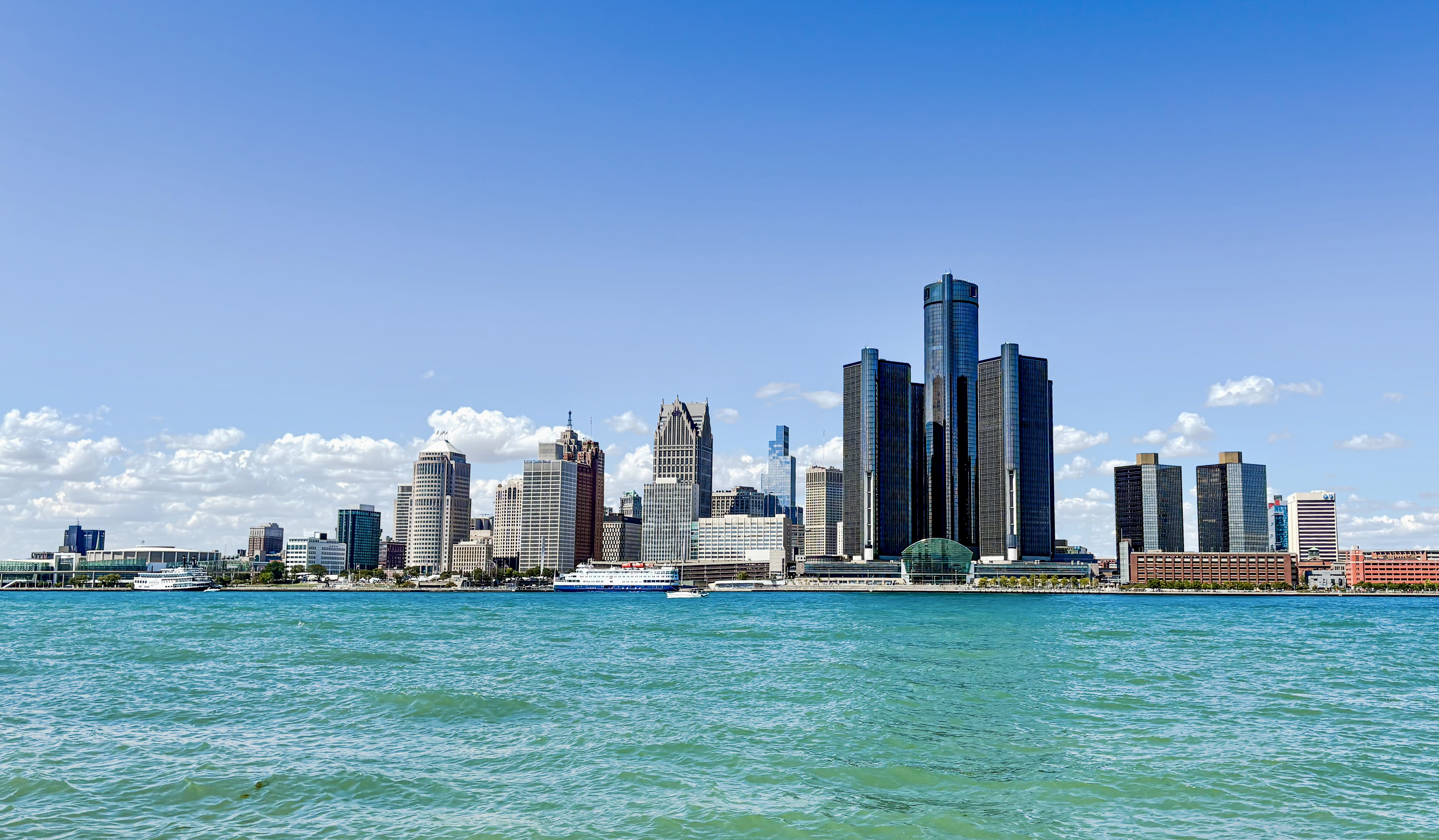
The skyline of Detroit

The city of Detroit, located in the U.S. state of Michigan, submitted bids to the International Olympic Committee (IOC) eight times (Note: Detroit's bid to host the 1948 Summer Olympics was not officially recognized by the IOC; see § 1948.) to host the Summer Olympic Games between 1944 and 1972. All of these bids were rejected, making Detroit the city that has bid the most times for the Olympics without ever hosting them.

Initially, Detroit bid for the Olympics alongside other American cities, but because these bids conflicted with each other, the IOC decided that only one city from each country could apply at a time. Beginning with bids for the 1960 Summer Olympics, the U.S. Olympic Committee (USOC) then became responsible for nominating one American city to bid for each edition of the Olympics. The committee chose Detroit four times in a row between 1960 and 1972, often over the acrimonious objections of representatives from other cities. Detroit did not submit a bid for the 1976 Summer Olympics, and its place as the American hosting candidate was taken by Los Angeles, which had been Detroit's greatest rival up to that point.

== 1928 ==
In December 1921, after being appointed as the commissioner of the city of Detroit's Department of Recreation, Clarence Brewer suggested building a 50,000-seat municipal stadium at a cost of $900,000 (equivalent to $16,200,000 in 2025), with the potential to host the 1928 Summer Olympics. The stadium was considered too costly and was not built.

== 1944 ==
The host of the planned 1940 Summer Olympics, Tokyo, was chosen at the 35th IOC Session on July 29, 1936, during the XI Summer Olympics in Berlin. Shortly afterward, a group of industry leaders in Detroit was inspired to bid for the next available Olympiad, 1944, an idea first suggested by J. B. Mills. On August 20, Harvey Campbell, the executive vice president of the Detroit Board of Commerce, announced the creation of a committee to study a potential Olympic bid. Since the Winter Olympics, at the time, were expected to be hosted in the same year and region as the Summer Games, it was suggested that these could have been held in Northern Michigan or the Upper Peninsula.

The plan was presented to Mayor Frank Couzens shortly before he left office, and Couzens left it to his successor to decide whether to pursue the idea. The new mayor, Richard Reading, supported the Olympic bid and appointed a new commission to make further plans shortly after he took office in January 1938. The Detroit Olympiad Committee voted to submit a bid to the IOC on July 18, 1938, and elected Frederick C. Matthaei Sr. as its chairman.

Detroit's bid book was presented to U.S. Olympic Association president Avery Brundage in August 1938. It proposed spending $2.5 million (equivalent to $57.2 million in 2025) to build a 100,000-seat stadium and a 15,000-seat outdoor pool in River Rouge Park, as well as an Olympic Village nearby. The bid also proposed using existing venues, including Olympia Stadium for most indoor sports, Michigan State Fairgrounds Coliseum for equestrian, and University of Detroit Stadium for track cycling. Sailing and yachting would have been held in the Detroit River and Lake St. Clair.

During the preparation of Detroit's bid, the Second Sino-Japanese War made it impossible for Tokyo to host the 1940 Games as planned, and the Japanese government backed out of hosting in July 1938. Detroit offered to step in as a replacement host, but the event was quickly transferred to Helsinki, which had previously bid for the event and lost to Tokyo. Detroit's representatives told IOC delegates that "the present war scare" in Europe could potentially force the 1944 Olympics to be thrown into doubt as well if the Games were awarded to London, the leading candidate. Matthaei reported in April 1939 that 14 delegates had pledged their support to Detroit, including seven of the eight IOC members from South America.

The host city selection took place on June 8, 1939, at the 38th IOC Session in London. Proxy votes were not permitted, so delegates who were not in London for the meeting could not cast a ballot. With London favored for 1944, Detroit's representatives told delegates they were interested in being considered as a host for 1948 instead. Detroit received only two votes, coming in third place behind Rome, with 11, and London, which won with 20.

After World War II broke out in Europe, it became doubtful that Helsinki could host the 1940 Summer Olympics. The IOC announced in October 1939 that it was considering moving the event again, this time possibly to Detroit or another U.S. city. Mayor Reading said that Detroit "would welcome the games with open arms", but Matthaei and other organizers were uncertain that the city could prepare in time for the summer of 1940. Ultimately, it was announced that no Olympics would be held until after the war was over, cancelling the Games for 1940 and eventually also for 1944.

== 1948 ==
With the conclusion of the war, discussions about hosting the Olympics in Detroit resumed. The Board of Commerce met on August 24, 1945, the week after V-J Day, to consider the possibility. When it became clear that the 1948 Summer Olympics could proceed as normal, London was favored as the host city because it had been forced to give up the 1944 Games. The Detroit Free Press wrote in October 1945 that "should London withdraw[,] the field will be wide open and Detroit's chances will be as good as those of any other city." In September, Avery Brundage stated that four American cities – Baltimore, Los Angeles, Minneapolis, and Philadelphia – had submitted "formal invitations" to host the Games, while Detroit had submitted an "informal invitation". The host city was chosen by a postal vote of IOC members, beginning in October 1945. Detroit was not included on the ballot, while the other four American candidates were. While the vote totals were never released, it was announced on February 14, 1946, that London had been selected by "the great majority of members".

== 1952 ==
Within a month of the host selection for 1948, the IOC announced that Detroit and four other cities – 1896 host Athens, deferred 1940 host Helsinki, 1932 host Los Angeles, and Philadelphia – had already submitted bids for the 1952 Summer Olympics. A Detroit delegation led by Frederick Matthaei traveled to Lausanne, Switzerland, for the 39th IOC Session in August 1946, the first meeting of IOC members since the London session in 1939 where Detroit lost its bid for 1944.

Detroit's proposal for the 1952 Games was substantially similar to what had been submitted eight years earlier. By this time, projected costs of staging the Olympics had increased to $12 million (equivalent to $200 million in 2025). An outdoor Olympic Stadium in River Rouge Park, built specially for the event, would have seated 104,000, and after the Games it would have been converted into a 68,000-seat indoor arena with an adjoining 18,000-seat outdoor amphitheatre. The recently expanded Detroit Naval Armory was suggested as a venue for indoor events such as fencing and weightlifting.

Alongside the Detroit bid group, a Winter Olympic Committee was formed by five cities in the Upper Peninsula: Calumet, Escanaba, Iron Mountain, Ishpeming, and Marquette.

The host city for the 1952 Summer Olympics was selected at the 40th IOC Session in Stockholm, on June 21, 1947. A group including Frederick Matthaei and Mayor Edward Jeffries flew to Sweden to present Detroit's bid to the IOC. A Free Press columnist boasted that Detroit was the "top bidder" for the Games and estimated the city's chances of hosting at 80 percent, but listed only Los Angeles and Minneapolis as rival candidates. In fact, seven cities submitted a bid to the IOC, five of which were American: the aforementioned three, Amsterdam, Chicago, Helsinki, and Philadelphia. Helsinki received half of the available votes on the first ballot and achieved a majority on the second, while Detroit got two votes in the first round and none in the last.

== 1956 ==
After the failure of the 1952 bid, USOC president Avery Brundage assured Matthaei that Detroit would get its chance soon, arguing that Helsinki had only been chosen because the war had disrupted its plans to host in 1940. To avoid the situation where several American cities were bidding for the same Games, the USOC announced that in February 1948, it would choose one city to endorse to the IOC for 1956. A USOC delegation visited all five of the U.S. cities which had bid for 1952. However, the decision was delayed until July, shortly before the delegation left to attend the 1948 Summer Olympics in London. It was alleged that the Olympic Association of Southern California had threatened to withhold funding for the American athletes headed to London if Los Angeles was not chosen by the USOC, which Matthaei charged were "unethical, inconsiderate actions of a selfish and ungrateful member allegedly in the Olympic movement." On July 11, the USOC announced that it was nominating Detroit as its candidate for 1956.

Since submitting its original proposal, Detroit had constructed one of the two purpose-built facilities it had promised for the Olympics, adding thousands of seats to Brennan Pool in River Rouge Park to turn it into an outdoor aquatic stadium. This was completed in time for the U.S. Olympic Swim Trials in July 1948. This left only the Olympic Stadium, the centerpiece of the plan, to be approved by city authorities, funded, and built. While the original plan called for the stadium to also be built in River Rouge Park, this time Matthaei recommended building it next to Wayne State University, so that the Wayne State Warriors football team and potentially also the Detroit Lions could use the stadium after the Olympics. Mayor Eugene Van Antwerp preferred the Michigan State Fairgrounds as a location, and in December 1948 he vetoed a city council resolution which pledged to build the stadium without specifying a site. The city council overrode Van Antwerp's veto, and in January 1949 accepted the donation of 100 acres (40 ha) on the city's northern limits to serve as a site for the stadium (now Farwell Park). This was the location advertised to the IOC.

On March 4, 1949, a month before the IOC was set to choose the host for 1956, the U.S. Senate passed a resolution recognizing and supporting Detroit's bid and no others from the United States. A few days later, Paul Helms of Los Angeles wrote to IOC president Sigfrid Edström to confirm that the city still planned to bid for the Olympics without the endorsement of the USOC or the federal government.

The host city for the 1956 Summer Olympics was selected at the 43rd IOC Session in Rome, Italy, on April 28, 1949. When the USOC learned that Los Angeles and Minneapolis were still planning to send delegates to bid for the Games, even without the USOC's endorsement, Avery Brundage and Doug Roby, Michigan's representative to the USOC, asked the two cities to withdraw their bids. Minneapolis' delegates agreed to withdraw only if Los Angeles did so, and Los Angeles (represented by John Jewett Garland, a voting member of the IOC who was from California) refused.

With the cities refusing to cooperate, Brundage asked the IOC to choose one nominee out of six American cities – the three already bidding, plus Chicago, Philadelphia, and San Francisco – and consider only that one nominee alongside the other world cities bidding. John Garland supported Brundage's request, saying that the American candidate cities would "avoid any dogfights over the nomination". However, the IOC did not act on this request, and all six American candidates were considered alongside Buenos Aires, Melbourne, Mexico City, and Montreal in the final IOC vote. Brundage said it was "rather embarrassing" that the dispute could not be resolved, while a representative from Melbourne said, "We are very optimistic, and made more so by the fact there are six American entries." Of the six American cities, only Detroit and Los Angeles escaped elimination after the first ballot. Both received four votes on the second ballot, while the front-runner Melbourne had 18. On the third ballot, Detroit kept its four votes and Los Angeles added a fifth; both were eliminated after this. Melbourne prevailed on the fourth ballot, winning over Buenos Aires by one vote.

When there was uncertainty about whether the Australian government would provide the needed financial support for the 1956 Games, both Detroit and Los Angeles volunteered as replacement hosts. The IOC seriously considered moving the event as late as 1955, but the Olympics were successfully hosted in Melbourne, except for the equestrian events, which were moved to Stockholm due to Australia's strict quarantine laws (see 1956 Summer Olympics).

== 1960 ==
A month after returning from Rome, the Detroit Olympic Committee gathered at the Hotel Statler and agreed to pursue a bid for the 1960 Summer Olympics. After the failure of the 1956 bid, Frederick Matthaei blamed the USOC for failing to stop the other cities from bidding without the committee's endorsement. Avery Brundage told him that there was nothing the USOC could do to prevent cities from going rogue, and Matthaei harshly criticized his response. In 1952, Brundage (who was born in Detroit, but left the city at age five) became the president of the IOC, a position he would hold for the next 20 years, while Doug Roby was appointed as an IOC member. In March 1954, Matthaei and Roby received the endorsement of the Detroit city council to pursue the 1960 bid.

On January 10, 1950, the USOC board met in Washington, D.C. It voted to ask the IOC to only consider the one American bid that received the USOC's endorsement, and to reprimand Garland for circumventing the committee's previous endorsement on the campaign for 1956. The USOC created a special committee to select one American candidate for the 1960 Summer Olympics and one for the 1960 Winter Olympics. Eight cities expressed interest in bidding for the Summer Games. Of these, Houston and Pittsburgh were rumored to be planning a bid, and New York City said that it would present one to the USOC, but none of the three did.

The five bids presented to the USOC selection jury at its meeting on November 17, 1954, in Chicago, were from representatives of Chicago, Detroit, Los Angeles, Minneapolis, and Philadelphia. Detroit was recommended by the jury as the candidate city. This time, Detroit's rival candidates respected the decision, and there were no other American bids presented to the IOC. Brundage warned that the European-dominated IOC was unlikely to choose two non-European hosts in a row and said that the U.S. would likely have to wait until 1964. However, he was impressed by a visit to the city in February 1955 and said that "Detroit is closer to winning its long fight to be an Olympic host than at any time in the past."

The host city for the 1960 Summer Olympics was selected at the 50th IOC Session in Paris on June 15, 1955. Detroit was one of seven cities that made presentations in Paris, alongside Brussels, Budapest, Lausanne, Mexico City, Rome, and Tokyo. On the first ballot, Detroit received six of the 59 available votes, leaving the city tied for fourth place with Brussels and Mexico City, and ahead of only Tokyo. These three cities were all eliminated after the first ballot, while Detroit was not. On the second ballot, Detroit came in third place with 11 votes and was eliminated alongside Budapest. Rome beat out Lausanne to be awarded the 1960 Games on the third and final ballot.

== 1964 ==
Although the city had now been passed over four times by the IOC, Matthaei and other Detroit representatives remained optimistic about the chances of their next bid. A resolution was circulated among IOC members recommending that the 1964 Summer Olympics be held on the "American continent", and when Matthaei officially congratulated Rome on its winning bid, Italian IOC executive board member Count Paolo Thaon di Revel replied saying he hoped that Detroit would win the right to host in 1964. These were taken as signs that the IOC favored Detroit for the next host city selection.

In November 1957, the Detroit Olympic Committee met with the Michigan State Fair Board, proposing that the main Olympic Stadium be built in the State Fairgrounds. Financing would have been managed by a state-created Olympic Authority, similar to the arrangement that had recently been used by the state of Michigan to build the Mackinac Bridge. Matthaei presented the stadium plan to the state legislature in March 1958, saying that the new stadium would be profitable in the long term if it became the permanent home of both the Detroit Lions and an unspecified National League baseball team that would relocate to Detroit (not the existing Detroit Tigers of the American League). Legislators rejected the request, fearing that the state would be responsible for the stadium's debts if it was not profitable in the long term.

As the USOC again prepared to select an American nominee, Detroit mayor Louis Miriani appointed an Olympic Games Authority board in July 1958, beginning the city's formal campaign to host the 1964 Games. Chicago, Los Angeles, and Minneapolis were the other cities that presented to the USOC at its Chicago meeting on September 6, 1958. Detroit was chosen, in part because the city already had good relations with the IOC and because it had improved its facilities since 1955.

In the meantime, the IOC had created new rules for candidate cities, requiring each bidder to have the endorsement of its National Olympic Committee as well as its national government (thereby further ensuring that only one city from any country could bid at one time). Accordingly, the U.S. Congress passed a joint resolution in March 1959 which invited the IOC to host the 1964 Olympics in Detroit.

The host city for the 1964 Summer Olympics was selected at the 55th IOC Session in Munich, West Germany, on May 26, 1959. The other candidates bidding were Brussels, Tokyo, and Vienna. Because Tokyo had been awarded the 1940 Summer Olympics and was forced to relinquish hosting duties by the outbreak of World War II, then needed to recover from the devastation of the war before it could consider bidding again, it was considered the front-runner in its 1964 bid. However, Detroit's candidacy reportedly had the support of the Soviet Olympic Committee, which wanted to see Communist athletes succeed in the heart of the United States. Ultimately, Tokyo received the majority of the vote on the first ballot and was immediately awarded the Games. Detroit came in second place with 10 votes, while Vienna, which had been considered a distant third-place contender, received nine.

== 1968 ==
Immediately after the Munich vote where Detroit was rejected as a 1964 host, Matthaei told reporters that the city's next chance to host the Olympics would not come until 1972, on the assumption that the IOC would continue its practice of never holding two consecutive Summer Olympics outside of Europe. He believed that the IOC was signaling that it wanted Vienna to host in 1968. By July 1959, however, Matthaei was preparing for a 1968 bid. That month, he wrote to the USOC to allege that Detroit's most recent bid had been sabotaged by Americans who favored bringing the Olympics to Los Angeles instead of Detroit. Matthaei claimed that John Jewett Garland, a Californian and one of the American delegates to the IOC, had voted for Tokyo because he wanted Los Angeles to host in 1968.

=== USOC nomination ===
After Detroit's successive failures, support for Los Angeles as the American candidate grew, as it was the only U.S. city that had previously hosted the Summer Olympics (except for the little-remembered 1904 Games in St. Louis). While attending the 1961 Rose Bowl in Pasadena, California, USOC president Kenneth L. "Tug" Wilson told a Los Angeles Times reporter that Los Angeles was the best qualified city to host the Games in the United States, largely because it would not need to build a new Olympic Stadium. When Moscow, the capital of the Soviet Union, emerged as one of the leading candidates for 1968, John Garland declared that "every vote [USOC delegates] cast for Detroit is a vote for the Iron Curtain", although he predicted that the committee would still choose the doomed city over Los Angeles anyway. Doug Roby, the other American rank-and-file IOC member, continued to favor Detroit.

As the USOC prepared for another nomination vote and the Southern California Committee for the Olympic Games grew its support, Matthaei returned to the state legislature in May 1962 to urge passage of a bill funding the State Fairgrounds stadium project. Detroit mayor Jerome Cavanagh, who had announced plans for a 60,000-seat municipal stadium downtown, canceled that project in favor of asking for state funding. This time they succeeded, and the legislature created a State Fair Authority which promptly endorsed the stadium proposal and was authorized to issue up to $35 million in government bonds (equivalent to $373 million in 2025) to fund its construction. Matthaei pledged that the stadium would be built whether Detroit was awarded the Olympics or not. This, combined with the recent completion of Cobo Arena and a planned major expansion of the Wayne State University campus that would be used as the Olympic Village, would have given Detroit all the facilities that Matthaei believed necessary to host the Olympics.

In September 1962, the USOC sent a seven-member Site Committee led by Robert Kane on a tour of nine cities which had expressed interest in hosting the 1968 Summer Olympics: Chicago, Detroit, Los Angeles, New Orleans, New York, Philadelphia, Portland (Oregon), San Francisco, and Washington, D.C. The Site Committee convened in Chicago on October 15 to vote on the recommendation it would give to the USOC board, which would choose the following day which city to endorse to the IOC based on that recommendation. Of the nine cities visited, only Detroit, Los Angeles, Philadelphia, Portland, and San Francisco were considered. Three of the seven Site Committee members were not present, and two of them were replaced by "observers" who voted on their behalf. The resulting six-member committee became deadlocked: three supported Detroit, three supported Los Angeles, and none were willing to budge. Supporters of Los Angeles' candidacy argued that the observers violated USOC bylaws by casting votes, further claiming that Los Angeles would have won if the observers had not voted. Debate continued through the night, and no decision had been reached by 7 a.m. October 16. One of the committee members then changed his vote from Los Angeles to Detroit, giving the city a 4–2 majority, and the USOC board of directors accepted that recommendation. The 37-member board then voted 20–13 to endorse Detroit's candidacy.

The dispute between the two cities did not end with the endorsement vote. Los Angeles supporters, including L.A. Memorial Coliseum general manager Bill Nicholas, alleged that the USOC had rigged the process in Detroit's favor. Doug Roby threatened to sue a Los Angeles-based attorney who accused him of circumventing the USOC's constitution and bylaws to get Detroit the nomination. In November 1962, California governor Edmund G. "Pat" Brown asked President John F. Kennedy to intervene and persuade the USOC to choose Los Angeles instead. Eight Michigan congressmen wrote to Kennedy, asking him to disregard Brown's request.

California officials continually pressed the USOC to reconsider its decision, and the committee agreed to hear the objections from Los Angeles at a New York meeting on March 18 and 19, 1963. To bolster Detroit's case ahead of the meeting, Michigan governor George Romney asked the state legislature to quickly pass two bills supporting construction of the Olympic Stadium, one creating a State Recreation Building Authority to issue bonds and one raising taxes on horserace gambling to pay off the bonds. Both bills were passed a few days before the USOC meeting. Philadelphia, Portland, and San Francisco all reactivated their bids before March, turning the USOC meeting into a second vote on the committee's endorsement. The five cities presented their bid materials to the USOC once again in New York, with Detroit having created a new film presentation for the event. Detroit received 32 of the committee's 40 votes, while Los Angeles received only four, Portland two, and Philadelphia and San Francisco one each.

=== IOC candidacy ===
Detroit was thus the only American city entitled to submit a bid to the IOC before applications closed on April 1, 1963, alongside three other candidates: Buenos Aires, Lyon, and Mexico City. West Berlin also submitted a bid, but the IOC rejected it on the grounds that hosting the Olympics there would be impossible without the support of East Berlin. Vienna, which was expected to be a front-runner for 1968, submitted a bid after the deadline and was rejected. Moscow, also expected as a leading contender, did not submit a bid at all.

In part because of the drawn-out conflict between Detroit and Los Angeles, the 1968 bid was the best publicized of the city's various campaigns to host the Olympics. Organizers collected 300,000 signatures from Michiganders supporting the bid, and expanded the petition nationwide with hopes of gathering over a million names.

To generate interest in the bid, and also to demonstrate that there was no lasting hostility between Los Angeles and Detroit, a cross-country Olympic-style torch relay was staged in the weeks before the IOC's vote. Los Angeles mayor Sam Yorty handed the first torch to Jim Beatty on September 27 at City Hall, and hundreds of high school and college athletes then ran the flame 24 hours a day for a distance of 2,521 miles (4,057 km). The relay runners followed U.S. Route 66 from Los Angeles to Chicago, then U.S. Route 12 and Interstate 94 from Chicago to Detroit. Reportedly, this was the longest non-stop relay run that had ever been conducted up to that time, presaging the future 1984 Summer Olympics torch relay which would pass through Detroit on its way from New York to Los Angeles. The torch arrived in Detroit on October 11 and was passed by Hayes Jones to Mayor Cavanagh, who was to leave Detroit for the IOC session the following day. However, the arrival ceremony at the City-County Building was disrupted by several dozen protesters, who were picketing the building because the city council had recently voted down an anti-redlining measure which would have forbidden home sellers and lenders from considering the race of their buyers and borrowers. One picket sign read "Is Detroit's segregated housing ready for the Olympics?"

The host city for the 1968 Summer Olympics was selected at the 60th IOC Session in Baden-Baden, West Germany, on October 18, 1963. The IOC initially intended to choose a host at its 59th Session in Moscow, but because Moscow was expected to be one of the candidate cities, the vote was delayed until the following session. The 60th Session was itself planned to be held in Nairobi, Kenya, but was moved a few months before the meeting when Kenya refused to issue visas to the IOC delegates from Portugal and South Africa, in protest against South African apartheid and Portugal's resistance to decolonizing its African territories. Mexico City received 30 of the 58 votes cast on the first ballot, and was awarded the Games. Detroit came in second place with 14 votes, while Lyon had 12 and Buenos Aires two. Since a second ballot would have been needed if Mexico City had received one vote fewer, Avery Brundage said that Detroit narrowly missed a chance to pick up support on later ballots that might have won it the 1968 Games.

== 1972 ==
With the city's defeat in the race for 1968, the Detroit Free Press concluded that the quest to host the Olympics had come to a "sudden and permanent halt", on the grounds that "the games are a cinch to go to Moscow in 1972". Doug Roby told the newspaper, "I am convinced now the members simply do not think the games should come to the United States". Mayor Cavanagh complained that Mexico City had boosted its chances by giving free tours to IOC members while hosting the 1962 World Modern Pentathlon Championships, and he declared that "Detroit will not bid for the Olympics again as long as I am mayor". The Detroit City Council asked the Detroit Olympic Committee to instead turn its expertise to supporting an effort to hold a World's Fair in the city in 1972. The State Fairgrounds stadium project was cancelled, and the tax money that was collected to fund its construction, which had reached $1.45 million by the time of the IOC vote (equivalent to $15.25 million in 2025), was placed back into the state's general fund.

The IOC planned to select the host for the 1972 Summer Olympics in 1966, one year earlier than in past cycles, giving the host six years to prepare instead of five. The USOC announced it would choose its nominee in January 1966, and on short notice in November 1965, it sent invitations to cities that had previously "shown interest in being host city", encouraging them to apply. These cities included Los Angeles, Portland, San Francisco, and St. Louis, but Doug Roby said he was unsure whether Detroit would receive an invitation because Mayor Cavanagh had said he would never approve another bid. However, Detroit did receive an invitation and the city promptly agreed to submit a bid. It was considered unlikely that any candidate on the same continent as Mexico City would be chosen for 1972, but Mayor Cavanagh said that "we would let 25 years of work go down the drain if we failed to keep our bid alive."

The USOC chose its nominee on January 15, 1966, in a meeting at the Chicago Sheraton. Detroit competed alongside four other cities: Chicago, Los Angeles, Philadelphia (which was primarily interested in setting up for a Bicentennial candidacy for 1976), and St. Louis. Detroit reused the presentation materials it had shown to the IOC in 1963, making it significantly better prepared than the other candidates. However, for the first time, the USOC board needed to put the nominee selection to multiple ballots because none of the cities initially received a majority of votes. On the first ballot, Detroit received 18 votes, Los Angeles 15, St. Louis eight, Chicago one, and Philadelphia none. The latter two candidates were eliminated, and on the second ballot Detroit received 21 votes, Los Angeles 16, and St. Louis five. Detroit was still one vote shy of a majority, so St. Louis was removed and the remaining two cities were put to a third ballot. This time, Detroit won by a vote of 25–17.

Since the campaign for 1968 ended, Frederick Matthaei had retired. The 1972 bid was led by his son, Frederick Matthaei Jr. The Detroit Olympic Committee expected to spend approximately $50,000 to $70,000 (equivalent to $500,000–$690,000 in 2025) during the three-month period between the USOC nomination and the IOC selection vote, a small fraction of the millions of dollars that would routinely be spent by later Olympic bidders. The presentation given to IOC members in 1966 was substantially similar to the one delivered in 1963. The Free Press observed that one of Detroit's longstanding disadvantages, the need to construct a new main stadium rather than using an existing venue, had disappeared because none of the other candidate cities had such a venue. However, it also noted that another disadvantage had replaced it: international opposition to the U.S.'s role in the Vietnam War, which had begun in 1965. Two days before the vote, Detroit organizer Frank Hedge attempted to distinguish the city from the other candidates by offering to let the IOC keep all of the television broadcasting revenues from the Games. This offer was rescinded quickly by Matthaei and Cavanagh, who thought Detroit would need the money and worried that the generosity might come off as a bribe.

The host city for the 1968 Summer Olympics was selected at the 64th IOC Session in Rome on April 26, 1966. The other candidates were Madrid, Montreal, and Munich, the last of which was widely expected to be chosen as the host. Munich came two votes shy of a majority on the first ballot, while Detroit received only six votes, putting the city in last place and leading it to be eliminated before the second ballot, on which Munich won.

== 1976 ==
In the immediate aftermath of the Rome IOC session, Matthaei and Hedge expressed confidence that Detroit would be back to bid for the 1976 Summer Olympics in four years. Detroit was one of five cities shortlisted by the USOC as candidates for those Games in September 1967. However, on August 9, 1968, a month before the USOC was set to choose its nominee, Detroit withdrew its bid. In the aftermath of the infamous 1967 riots, and with the city's position as an industrial powerhouse beginning to decline, Mayor Cavanagh announced that he had informed the USOC that Detroit would not bid for the Olympics again "until we solve the more immediate problems of housing, education, employment and social welfare of our citizens." Fred Matthaei Jr. criticized the decision, saying that bidding once again "could provide both the physical facilities and the great psychological lift this city badly needs", but Cavanagh's announcement effectively put a permanent end to Detroit's 32-year campaign to host the Olympics. The USOC instead nominated Los Angeles' bid; Los Angeles was rejected for 1976 and 1980, but ultimately hosted the 1984 Summer Olympics.

== See also ==
- United States bids for the Olympic Games
- Los Angeles bids for the Summer Olympics
- Lake Placid bids for the Winter Olympics
- Salt Lake City bids for the Winter Olympics
- Anchorage bids for the Winter Olympics
- Sports in Detroit
