= William May Garland =

American businessman (1866–1948)

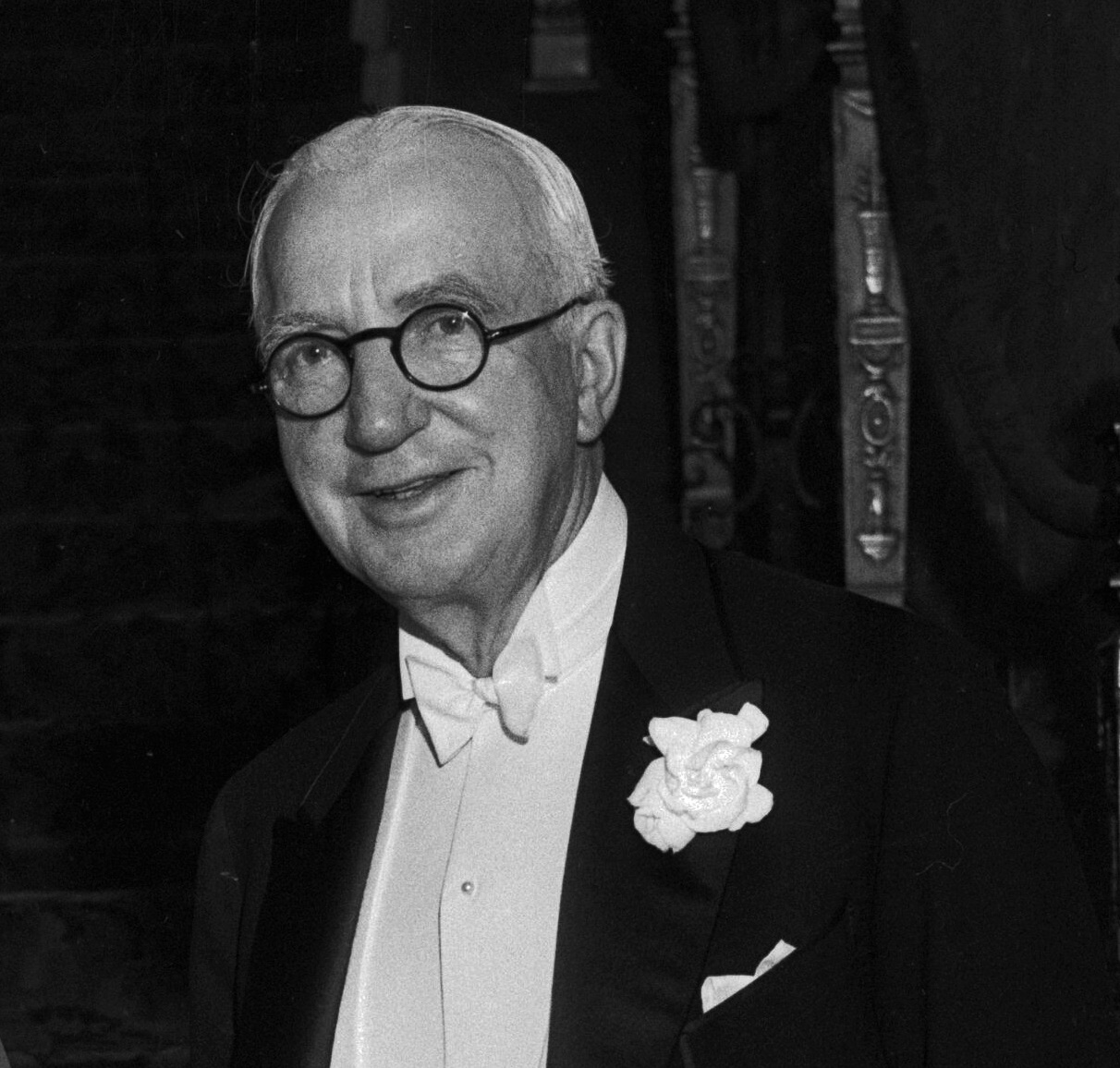
- Garland, c. 1934
- Born: March 31, 1866; Westport, Maine
- Died: September 26, 1948 (aged 82); Monterey, California
- Resting place: San Gabriel Cemetery, San Gabriel, California, U.S.
- Occupation: Businessman
- Spouse: Sadie Blanche Hinman (m. 1898)
- Children: 2

William May Garland (March 31, 1866 – September 26, 1948) was an American business man, real estate developer, and public figure. He was the son of Jonathan May Garland and Rebecca Heagan Jewett, and his real estate company contributed greatly to the growth of Los Angeles in the years before and after 1900. He served as a member of the International Olympic Committee from 1922 to 1948, and he was responsible for bringing the 1932 Summer Olympics to Los Angeles. He would later become President of the Organising Committee for the Olympic Games for the 1932 Summer Olympics.

== Early history ==
William May Garland was born in Westport, Maine on March 31, 1866. In 1882 at age 16, he went to Boston, and by 1884 he was in Chicago. In 1890, he moved to Los Angeles working as auditor of the Pacific Cable Railway Company until 1894, when he formed his real estate business, the W. M. Garland Company, headquartered in Henry Huntington's Pacific Electric Building, which became the site of the Jonathan Club. He was Huntington's principal sales agent. In September 1895, Garland and Huntington were among the founding members of the Jonathan Club. William May Garland's granddaughter was told that when deciding the name of the club, he said "let's call it the Jonathan Club after my father" (Jonathan Garland). There are other theories on the naming of the club, but this is what William, as one of the founders, told his family.

In 1898, he traveled to New York to marry, on October 12, Sadie Blanche Hinman, daughter of Marshall Littlefield Hinman and Amanda Josephine Miller. William and Blanche had two children, William Marshall Garland and John Jewett Garland.

== The Olympics ==
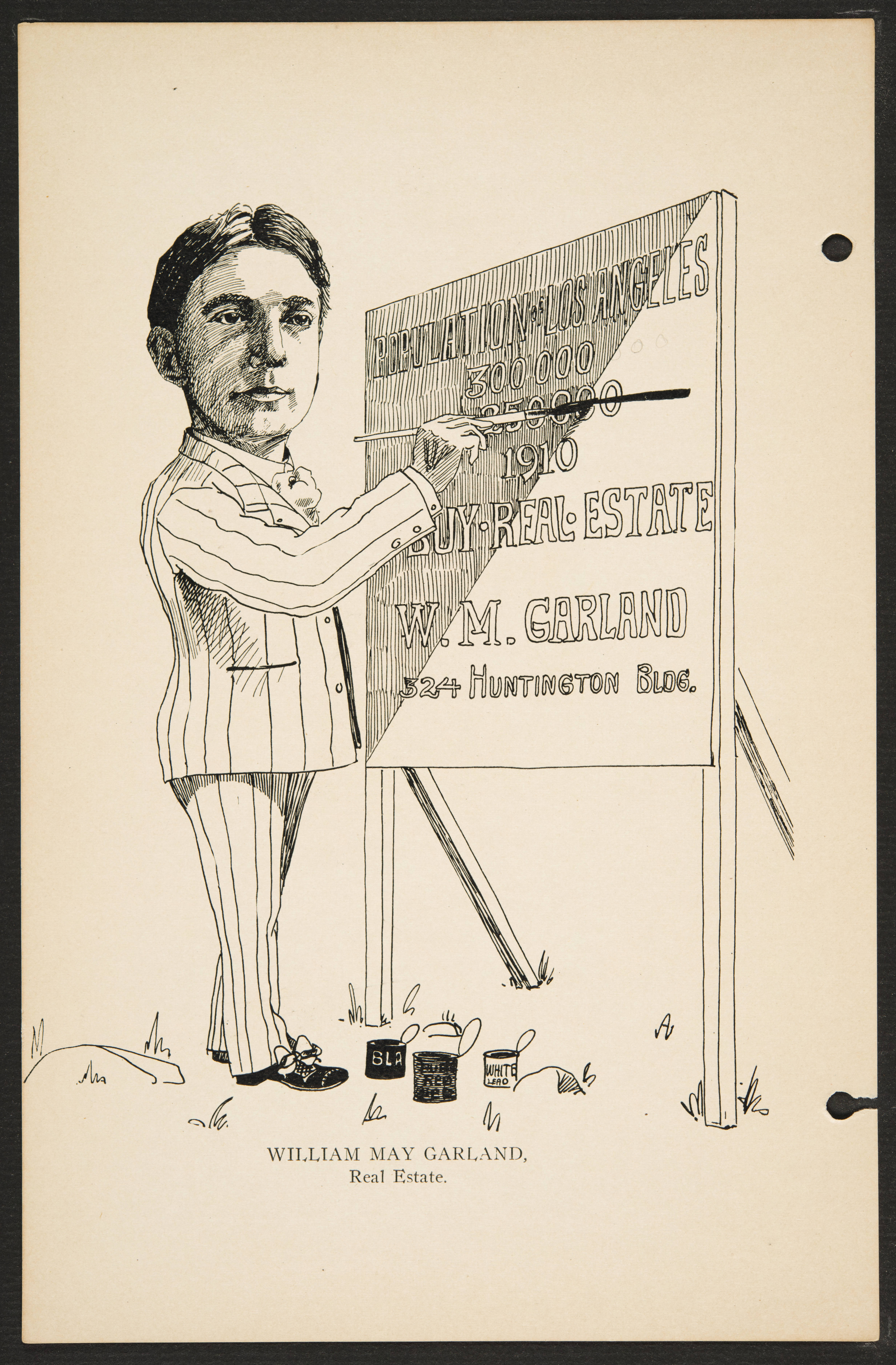
Caricature depicting William May Garland, from As we see 'em

In 1919, Garland was a co-founder of the California Fiestas Association, a group responsible for organizing celebratory events. Garland mentioned "Olympian games" as one of the many types of events the group sought to bring to Los Angeles. At this time, Garland was also president of the Community Development Association, which was partnering with the city and county of Los Angeles to build a large new stadium in Exposition Park (which would ultimately become Los Angeles Memorial Coliseum). Beginning in June 1920, it was suggested that the stadium could potentially be used as the primary venue for the 1924 Summer Olympics.

With this goal in mind, Garland was appointed to lead "a delegation of prominent Los Angeles men" to Antwerp, where they would attend the 1920 Summer Olympics, meet with members of the International Olympic Committee, and advocate for their city as the next Olympic host. In Antwerp, Garland met with Baron Pierre de Coubertin, who had founded the IOC in 1894 and had been its president ever since. Coubertin and the other members of the IOC were impressed by Garland's presentation, and the minutes of the IOC session recorded that "Mr. Garland from Los Angeles made a brilliant presentation of the city's candidacy." However, Coubertin desired that his own home city of Paris would host in 1924 (although it had previously hosted in 1900) and had already promised the 1928 Summer Olympics to Amsterdam. The final decision was postponed until the next IOC session in Lausanne, Switzerland, in 1921, where both of Coubertin's choices for 1924 and 1928 were approved.

Garland continued to correspond with Coubertin, frequently sending him newspaper clippings about the progress of the Memorial Coliseum's construction. The two men became friends, and in November 1921, Coubertin offered Garland a seat as a member of the IOC, recently vacated by Allison V. Armour. Garland was officially elected to the IOC on March 17, 1922. Garland used this position to offer Los Angeles again as a potential backup host for either the 1924 or 1928 Olympics. Coubertin grew frustrated with these offers and urged him to instead make a bid for the next available Games, those of 1932.

With the Coliseum nearly finished, Garland traveled to the 21st IOC Session in Rome, which began on April 7, 1923. There, he met with Pope Pius XI and Benito Mussolini. On the third day of the session, Garland presented Los Angeles' bid for the 1932 Summer Olympics. He argued that the city made an excellent Olympic host not only because of its new stadium, but also because it was far removed from the political turmoil of postwar Europe. The assembled committee members immediately and unanimously moved to award the 1932 Olympics to Los Angeles, without further debate and without considering bids from other cities. The decision was unusual, as those Games were still nine years away and no other city had been given the opportunity to bid for the event. In telegraphing the news of the decision back home, Garland wrote that Coubertin "told me he saw dark times ahead for Europe. He believes that the Pacific coast, with Los Angeles as the center, is the proper place for the world's meeting of athletes."

In 1924 and 1925, it was uncertain whether the Dutch government could support the upcoming 1928 Summer Olympics in Amsterdam, and the IOC considered revoking the city's right to host. Coubertin asked Garland whether Los Angeles could host the Olympics in 1928 instead of 1932. Garland refused, believing that the city would benefit from the extra time to prepare for its Games. In November 1928, Garland successfully campaigned for a statewide referendum to provide $1 million (equivalent to $19 million in 2025) in public funding for the Games, arguing that "the $1,000,000 will bring the people $100,000,000."

The Olympics were held in Los Angeles during the depths of the Great Depression, and some referred to the upcoming Games as "Garland's folly". Despite the difficult economic circumstances, the 1932 Summer Olympics were hailed as a success, and President Herbert Hoover wrote to Garland to praise "the magnificent way you carried through the Olympic Games."

In September 1939, with the outbreak of World War II in Europe, it was expected that the 1940 Summer Olympics, planned for Helsinki, Finland, would have to be canceled or moved. USOC chairman Avery Brundage suggested that the United States could potentially host the Olympics if Finland backed out. In response, Garland and Paul H. Helms founded the Southern California Committee for the Olympic Games, which wrote to Brundage to offer Los Angeles as a potential host. The SCCOG still exists today and has participated in Los Angeles' successful bids for the 1984 and 2028 Summer Olympics.

Garland remained a member of the IOC for 26 years. His health deteriorated to the point that he could not attend the 1948 Summer Olympics in London, and he submitted his resignation from the IOC ahead of the meeting. His son John Jewett Garland, who had assisted him during previous sessions, was elected to his seat on the committee. Garland retired to the family's summer home, Casa Ladera in Pebble Beach. He died on September 26, 1948, in Monterey, California.

Sporting positions
Preceded by (Netherlands) Solko van den Bergh	President of the Organising Committee for the Olympic Games; 1932	Succeeded by (Germany) Joseph Goebbels; Karl Ritter von Halt
