= Venues of the 1984 Summer Olympics =

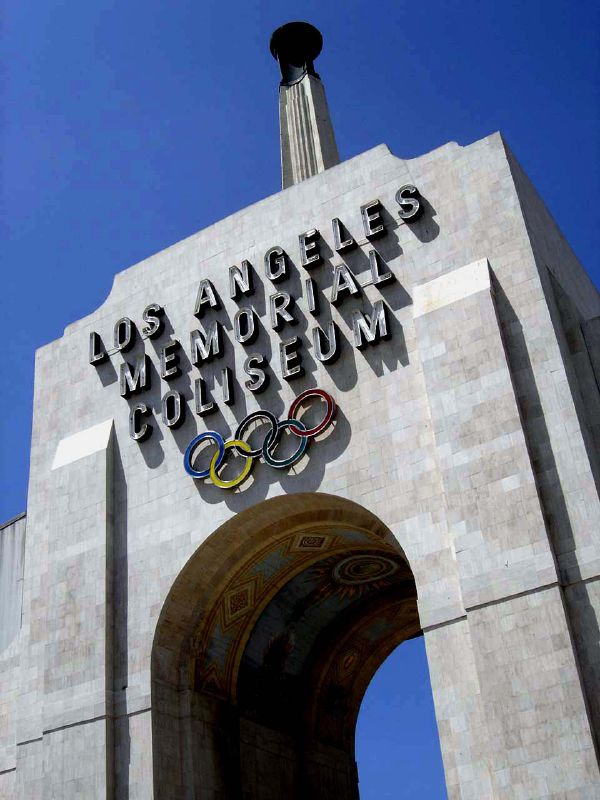
The Los Angeles Memorial Coliseum (pictured in 2005) served as the main stadium for the 1984 Summer Olympics

For the 1984 Summer Olympics, a total of thirty-one venues were used. The Los Angeles Memorial Coliseum and the Rose Bowl, two venues previously used for the 1932 Summer Olympics, were used for the 1984 Games. Between the 1932 and the 1984 Summer Olympics, the expansion of professional sports teams assisted in the growth of the facilities that would be used for the 1984 events. Only two new permanent venues were constructed, both using corporate sponsorship, though neither were mentioned in the official Olympic report. Many other venues had temporary adjustments and returned to their normal usage once the 1984 Olympics were completed. Stanford Stadium in Palo Alto and the Rose Bowl later served as venues for the Super Bowl, the FIFA World Cup, and the FIFA Women's World Cup.

== Venues ==
=== Los Angeles ===
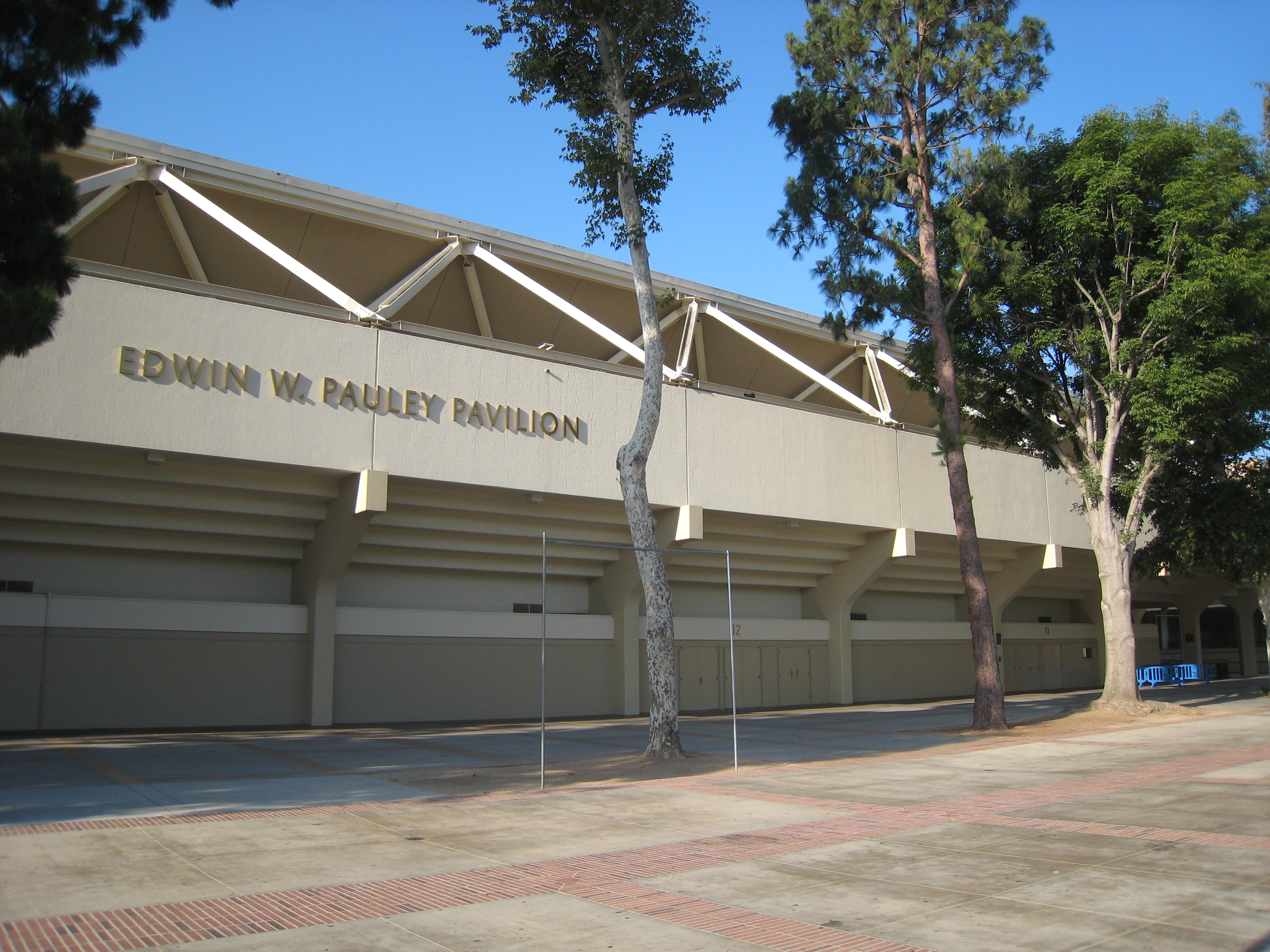
The Pauley Pavilion (pictured in 2008) hosted the gymnastics events for the 1984 Summer Olympics

Venue	Sports	Capacity	Ref.
Albert Gersten Pavilion	Weightlifting	4,156	
Eagle's Nest Arena	Judo	4,200	
Los Angeles Memorial Coliseum	Athletics, Ceremonies (opening/ closing)	92,516	
Los Angeles Memorial Sports Arena	Boxing	15,700	
Olympic Swim Stadium	Diving, Swimming, Synchronized swimming	16,500	
Pauley Pavilion	Gymnastics	12,829	
Streets of Los Angeles	Athletics (20 km/ 50 km walk, marathon)	—	

=== Elsewhere in Southern California ===
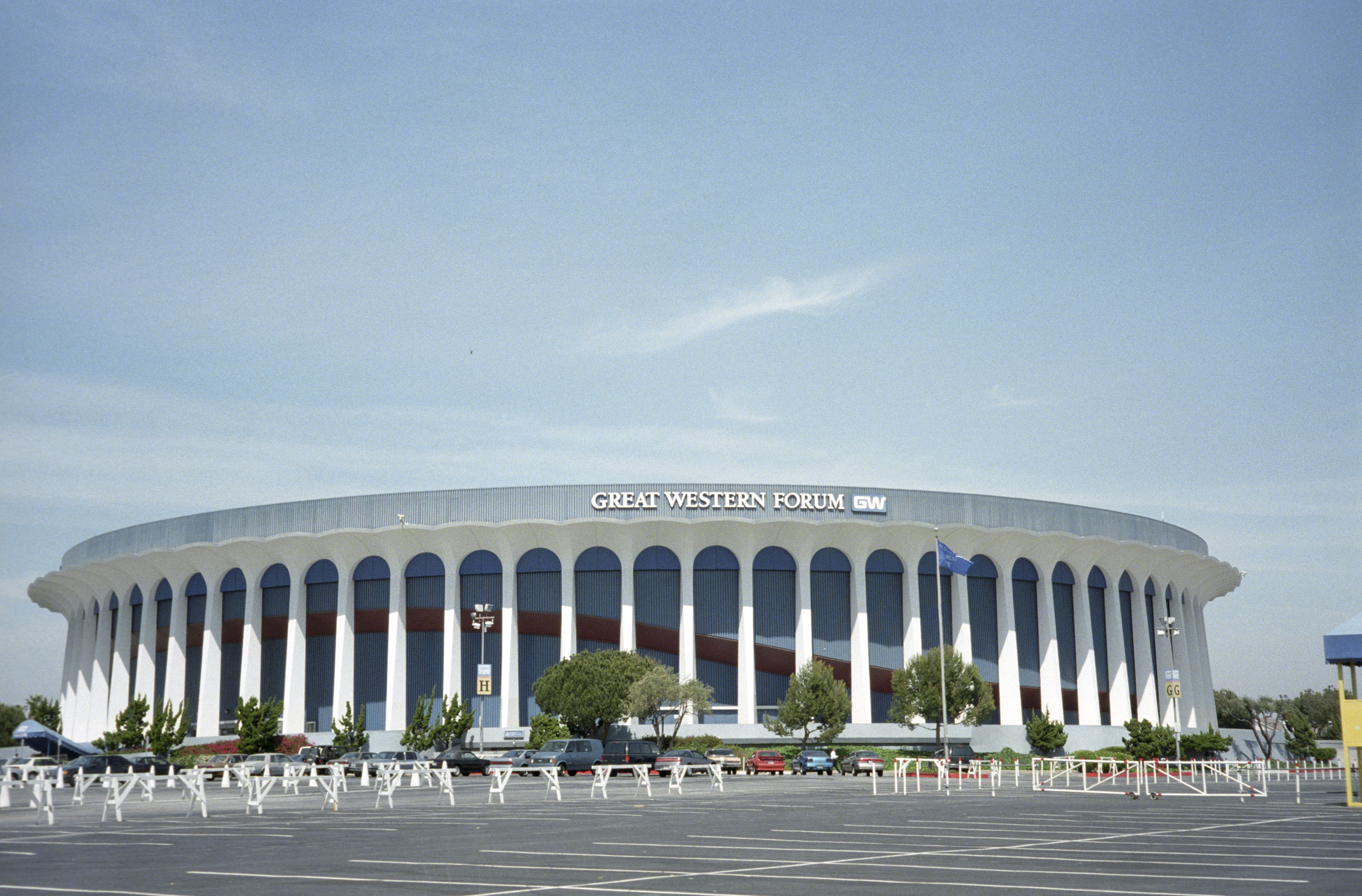
The Forum (pictured in 1997) hosted the basketball events for the 1984 Summer Olympics

Venue	Location	Sports	Capacity	Ref.
Anaheim Convention Center	Anaheim	Wrestling	7,200	
Artesia Freeway	Gardena to Riverside	Cycling (road team time trial)	—	
Coto de Caza	Coto de Caza	Modern pentathlon (fencing, riding, running, shooting)	8,000	
El Dorado Park	Long Beach	Archery	4,000	
Fairbanks Ranch Country Club	Rancho Santa Fe	Equestrian (eventing endurance)	50,000	
The Forum	Inglewood	Basketball	17,505	
Heritage Park Aquatic Center	Irvine	Modern pentathlon (swimming)	8,000	
Lake Casitas	Ventura County	Canoeing, Rowing	4,680	
Long Beach Arena	Long Beach	Volleyball	12,000	
Long Beach Convention Center	Long Beach	Fencing	2,500	
Long Beach Shoreline Marina	Long Beach	Sailing	—	
Olympic Velodrome	Carson	Cycling (track)	8,400	
Prado Regional Park	Chino	Shooting	5,000	
Raleigh Runnels Memorial Pool	Malibu	Water polo	5,000	
Rose Bowl	Pasadena	Football (final)	103,300	
Santa Anita Park	Arcadia	Equestrian	33,500	
Santa Monica College	Santa Monica	Athletics (marathon start)	—	
Streets of Mission Viejo		Cycling (individual road race)	—	
Streets of Santa Monica		Athletics (marathon)	—	
Titan Gymnasium	Fullerton	Handball	3,300	
Weingart Stadium	Monterey Park	Field hockey	22,000	

=== Other venues ===
Venue	Location	Sports	Capacity	Ref.
Harvard Stadium	Boston, Massachusetts	Football	30,323	
Navy–Marine Corps Memorial Stadium	Annapolis, Maryland	Football	34,000	
Stanford Stadium	Stanford, California	Football	85,500	

=== Demonstration sports ===
Venue	Sports	Capacity	Ref.
Dodger Stadium	Baseball	56,000	
Los Angeles Tennis Center	Tennis	5,800	

== Before the Olympics ==
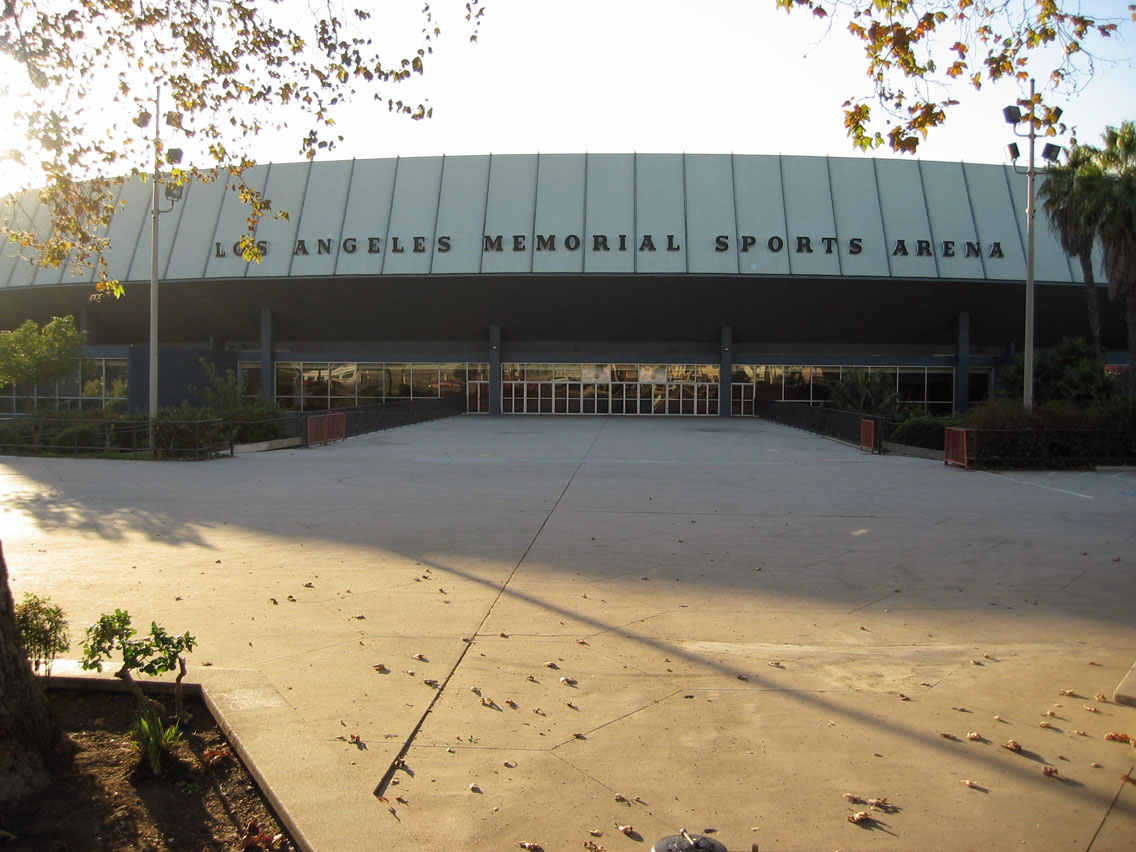
The Los Angeles Memorial Sports Arena (pictured in 2005) hosted the boxing competitions for the 1984 Summer Olympics

When the Summer Olympics came to Los Angeles in 1932, two of the venues that hosted were the Los Angeles Memorial Coliseum and the Rose Bowl in Pasadena. The former hosted the athletics, equestrian eventing and jumping, field hockey, and gymnastics event while the latter was constructed into a velodrome for track cycling events. In 1973, the Coliseum played host to Super Bowl VII where the Miami Dolphins defeated the Washington Redskins 14-7 to go undefeated for the entire 1972 National Football League (NFL) season. In 1979, the Los Angeles Rams won their seventh straight NFL National Football Conference (NFC) Western Division title, and finally advanced to Super Bowl XIV where they lost to the Pittsburgh Steelers in the Rose Bowl. That season would also be the Rams' last season at the Coliseum where they lost their last game there against the New Orleans Saints 29-14. For the 1980 NFL season, the Rams moved to Anaheim Stadium (Angel Stadium of Anaheim since 2004) in Anaheim (southeast of Los Angeles), although they lost their first game there against the Detroit Lions. The Rams would remain at Anaheim Stadium until the end of the 1994 season when they moved to St. Louis, Missouri where they remained until 2015 before returning to Los Angeles in 2016. Their last game in Anaheim was against the Redskins, losing 24-21. Following the 1981 NFL season, the Coliseum became home for the Oakland Raiders NFL team, where they opened up their 1982 season results with a win over the defending Super Bowl champions San Francisco 49ers 23-17. The Coliseum since 1923 has continued to play host for the University of Southern California football team and still does as of 2010. The Trojans' cross-town rivals, the UCLA Bruins, shared the Coliseum with Trojans from 1928 to 1981. In 1982, the Bruins moved to the Rose Bowl where they have remained as of 2020. Besides Super Bowl XIV, the Rose Bowl hosted Super Bowl XVII where the Redskins avenged their Super Bowl loss to the Dolphins from ten years earlier with a 27-17 victory.

Santa Anita Park opened in 1934. Normally used for Thoroughbred horse racing, the home stretch of the track was converted to house dressage, eventing, and jumping events for the 1984 Summer Games, including stands.

Seven years after the 1932 Summer Games, a Southern California Committee for the Olympic Games (SCCOG) was created in an effort to bring the Summer Olympics back to Los Angeles. The first attempt was for the then-cancelled 1940 Summer Olympics in Tokyo. Following World War II, Los Angeles and SCCOG made bids for the 1952 and 1956 Summer Olympics, losing to eventual winners Helsinki and Melbourne, respectively. The United States Olympic Committee selected Detroit over Los Angeles for the United States's bid for the Summer Olympics between 1960 and 1972 without success. SCCOG did provide assistance to Squaw Valley in the northern part of the state near Lake Tahoe for the 1960 Winter Olympics. Los Angeles first bid for the 1976 Summer Olympics was in 1967, though it had to beat its northern neighbor San Francisco for being the American representative in the International Olympic Committee (IOC) bidding in 1969. Montreal was awarded the 1976 Summer Olympics over Moscow and Los Angeles. New leadership in SCCOG in 1972 along with lessons learned helped Los Angeles in bidding for the 1980 Summer Olympics though this time they would lose out to Moscow for the 1980 Summer Olympics. Los Angeles bid for the 1984 Summer Olympics with a minimal amount of new construction costs and a reliance on corporate sponsorships (unlike Montreal 76 and Moscow 80 that were government funded with high construction costs). Bid studies were done in Los Angeles between 1975 and 1978. The city was awarded the 1984 Games in 1978 by the IOC since they were the sole bidder.

In 1959, the Los Angeles Memorial Sports Arena was completed. The following year, it hosted the 1960 Democratic National Convention. Following the 1959-60 NBA season, the National Basketball Association (NBA) Lakers franchise would move from Minneapolis to Los Angeles, where they would use the Los Angeles Memorial Sports Arena from the 1960-61 to the 1966-67 season before they moved to The Forum in Inglewood, a Los Angeles suburb, for the 1967-68 season. From 1959 to 1964, the Sports Arena served as home for the UCLA Bruins men's basketball team until the Bruins moved to Pauley Pavilion on the UCLA campus. The USC Trojans men's basketball team also used the Sports Arena as home.

Lake Casitas was formed when the Ventura River was dammed in 1962. This was done for drinking water purposes in the Oak View area.

In 1966, Los Angeles was awarded a National Hockey League (NHL) franchise, the Los Angeles Kings. They spent the first two months of their inaugural season at the Long Beach Arena before joining the NBA's Lakers at The Forum.

Only two new permanent venues were constructed for the Games: the Olympic Velodrome on the California State University, Dominguez Hills campus and the Olympic Swim Stadium on the University of Southern California campus. The Velodrome was constructed between 1981 and 1982, while the Swim Stadium was constructed between 1980 and 1983. 7-Eleven convenience stores sponsored the Velodrome, while McDonald's sponsored the Swim Stadium, though neither corporate name was mentioned in the official Olympic report.

Temporary venues were set up for El Dorado and Prado Parks.

== During the Olympics ==
At the Coliseum, Carl Lewis of the United States matched the four gold medals set by Jesse Owens at the 1936 Summer Olympics in Berlin with four golds of his own in the men's 100 m, 200 m, 4 × 100 m relay, and long jump events. During the inaugural women's marathon event, Honduras's Leda Díaz de Cano fell 6.5 minutes behind the lead pack after 5 km (3.1 mi) and 27.5 minutes after 20 km (12 mi), eventually leaving the course.

During the cycling men's individual road race, a crowd of 300,000 lined the route.

== After the Olympics ==
Stanford Stadium, the host to some of the football preliminaries, played host to NFL's Super Bowl XIX in January 1985, where the 49ers defeated the Dolphins 38-16. The stadium is still home to the Stanford University football team, even after it was reconstructed in 2006, reducing its capacity to 50,000.

For the 1994 FIFA World Cup, Stanford and the Rose Bowl both hosted matches. Stanford hosted the quarterfinal match between Sweden and Romania while the Rose Bowl hosted the final match between Brazil and Italy, both matches were decided by penalty kicks. Five years later, the two venues would be used to host FIFA Women's World Cup matches. Stanford hosted the semifinal match between the United States and Brazil while the Rose Bowl hosted the final match between the United States and China, also decided in a shootout. Prior to the World Cups, the Rose Bowl also hosted Super Bowls XXI and XXVII. The Rose Bowl remains the venue for UCLA's football team while Pauley Pavilion remains the venue for UCLA's basketball teams.

The Raiders remained at the Coliseum until the end of the 1994 NFL season. The last Raiders game played at the Coliseum was a 19-9 loss to the Kansas City Chiefs. Next year, the Raiders returned to Oakland where they remained until 2020 when they moved to their current home in Las Vegas, Nevada. In January 2016, the then-St. Louis Rams received approval from the NFL to return to Los Angeles, returning to the metropolitan area after a 21-year exodus; the Rams played most of their home schedule in the Coliseum from 2016 to 2019 while SoFi Stadium was under construction in Inglewood (The Rams and Los Angeles Chargers (formerly San Diego) moved into SoFi in 2020.).

Both association football venues on the East Coast of the United States, Harvard Stadium and Navy–Marine Corps Memorial Stadium, remain in use to this day. Harvard Stadium, on the campus of Harvard University, is best known as home to the school's (American) football team, but is also home to Harvard's teams in men's and women's lacrosse, and has been used for several other sports. Navy–Marine Corps Memorial Stadium, on the grounds of the United States Naval Academy, hosts the Academy's football, men's lacrosse, and women's lacrosse teams. Since the 2013 edition, the Military Bowl, a college football bowl game, has been played at the stadium as well.

The Los Angeles Memorial Sports Arena remained home to the University of Southern California's basketball team until the 2005-06 NCAA basketball season when the Trojans moved on campus. For the 1984-85 NBA season, the Clippers franchise relocated from San Diego to Los Angeles where they played at the Los Angeles Memorial Sports Arena. The Clippers shared its home between the Los Angeles Memorial Sports Arena and the Arrowhead Pond of Anaheim (Honda Center since 2006) from the 1994-95 to the 1997-98 NBA seasons. The Los Angeles Memorial Sports Arena was closed in March 2016, and demolished between September and October 2016. Banc of California Stadium, a soccer-specific stadium and home of Los Angeles FC of Major League Soccer, was constructed on the site of the Sports Arena and opened in April 2018.

In late 1999, the Staples Center opened in downtown Los Angeles. For the 1999–2000 NBA and NHL seasons, the NBA's Lakers and Clippers, and the NHL's Kings all moved out of the Los Angeles Sports Arena and the Forum in Inglewood, and moved into the Staples Center, renamed Crypto.com Arena in early 2022.

The Olympic Velodrome located on the California State University, Dominguez Hills campus was demolished in 2003. Meanwhile, the Olympic Swim Stadium remains in use on the University of Southern California's campus both for recreation and for competition.

Six of the venues which were used during the 1984 Olympics will host events at the 2028 Summer Olympics when Los Angeles hosts the games for a third time. Those venues include the Los Angeles Memorial Coliseum, Dodger Stadium, the Long Beach Convention Center, the Long Beach Arena, Santa Anita Park and the Rose Bowl.
