= Paul H. Helms =

American executive in the baking industry and sports philanthropist

Paul Helms
- Born: September 19, 1889; Ottawa, Kansas, US
- Died: January 5, 1957 (aged 67); Palm Springs, California, US
- Occupations: Baking industry executive, sports philanthropist
- Known for: Helms Bakery, Helms Athletic Foundation
- Awards: Los Angeles Memorial Coliseum Court of Honor, 1958

Paul Hoy Helms (September 19, 1889 – January 5, 1957) was an American executive in the baking industry and sports philanthropist. He founded the Helms Bakery in 1931 and the Helms Athletic Foundation with Bill Schroeder in 1936.

== Early life ==
=== Birth and parents ===
Helms was born in Ottawa, Kansas. His father, Rev. Dr. Elmer Ellsworth Helms, a Methodist minister, married Ora Ella Hoy on July 26, 1888. His mother died on May 12, 1893, during childbirth when he was three years old.

=== Uncle William E. "Dummy" Hoy ===
Upon the death of his mother, his father sent Paul to move in with his maternal uncle, William E. "Dummy" Hoy. (Hoy was a deaf-mute and a Major League Baseball player who played for the Cincinnati Reds and the Chicago White Sox. He led the team during the 1901 Chicago White Stockings season to win the AL pennant.) Helms lived on his uncle's dairy farm in Mount Healthy, Ohio, outside Cincinnati, with his aunt Anna Maria (who was also deaf) and their six children.

=== Education ===
Helms attended school in Buffalo, New York and then matriculated at Syracuse University, where he was a coxswain on the crew team. He graduated from Syracuse University in 1912.

== Career ==
=== Early career ===
After graduating from Syracuse in 1912, Helms began working as a life insurance agent in Pennsylvania, where he met and married Pearl Ellis. After two years, they moved to New York, where Helms started a small bakery, taking it from one route to 200. In 1926 at the age of 37, he was forced to retire from his bakery business due to poor health. In 1928 he moved his family to Los Angeles, where he stated, "within a few months, I was itching to get back to work."

=== Helms Bakery ===
On March 2, 1931, Helms opened Helms Bakery at the corner of Venice and Washington in Los Angeles County. He employed 32 people and owned 11 trucks, referred to as coaches. The Twincoach Helm's bakery truck, with its recognized two-tone custom paint job, is on display at the Petersen Automotive Museum in Los Angeles. The building, and Helms' actual desk, straddles the city line between Culver City and Los Angeles.

==== Business operations ====
Helms Bakery was an enormous operation. It was at its height in the 1950s with 950 sales routes as far north as Fresno and as south as San Diego. The list of baked goods topped 150 items and he had 1,850 employees. Helms Bakeries were turning out more than a million loaves of bread a day, all home-delivered by the Helms Bakery trucks. In addition to the breads, doughnuts and pastries, Helms delivered about 150 custom-made wedding and birthday cakes a week.

===== Olympic Games =====
In 1932, Los Angeles was the host city for the Summer Olympics. Helms received the contract to supply baked goods to athletes and officials living in the Olympic Village in Baldwin Park. Carl Diem, manager of the German team in 1932, was so impressed with the quality of Helms' bread that he asked Helms to supply the bread for the 1936 Summer Olympics in Berlin. Helms sent two of his employees to bake bread in Berlin according to his recipes. Helms Bakery products were also served at the 1948 Summer Olympics in London and the 1952 Summer Olympics in Helsinki.

Helms also supported efforts to have Los Angeles host the Olympics again, co-founding the Southern California Committee for the Olympic Games with William May Garland and traveling to sessions of the International Olympic Committee to advocate for the city's bids for the Olympic Games. SCCOG would later succeed in this effort after Helms' death. During his lifetime, however, Los Angeles' chances of being chosen as a host were jeopardized by Helms' dispute with Olympic officials over the use of Olympic symbols in his marketing.

Beginning in 1932, Helms used the phrase "Official Olympic Bread" to market his products, and painted it on all of his coaches. His slogan was "Olympic Games Bakers – Choice of Olympic Champions", and he applied for trademarks on the Olympic rings and other symbols related to the Games. In September 1938, these trademarks were granted by the United States Patent and Trademark Office. In response, the United States Olympic Committee and its president Avery Brundage ordered Helms to stop using Olympic symbols in his marketing, but the issue was forgotten during World War II. Brundage repeated his demands in 1947 after learning that Helms would be supplying bread in the upcoming London Games. IOC president Sigfrid Edström requested the same when made aware of Helms' actions in 1949. However, at the time, neither the USOC nor the IOC had ever attempted to register the Olympic symbols as their intellectual property. In 1950, Helms agreed to relinquish his trademarks and stop using the symbols in his advertising. This conflict, alongside other similar disputes, led the IOC to apply for international trademark protection of these symbols, which it now holds in all countries party to the Madrid Protocol or the Nairobi Treaty on the Protection of the Olympic Symbol.

===== "The First Bread on the Moon" =====
On July 16, 1969, Apollo 11 lifted off to make the first Moon landing and then return to Earth as per President Kennedy's objective. The company secured a contract to furnish bread for the mission, making Helms baked goods "The First Bread on the Moon".

==== Helms Bakery closes ====
Helms Bakery closed its doors in 1969, five months after Helms bread landed on the moon.

== Palm Springs ==
=== Committee of Twenty-Five ===
Helms was a regular visitor of Palm Springs, California and owned a second residence at Smoke Tree Ranch. In 1948 Helms and other influential permanent and winter residents formed The Committee of Twenty-Five to promote civic activities in Palm Springs. Other members included Asa V. Call, President of Pacific Mutual Life Insurance Co., LeGrand Simson DeGraff, Chairman of Marine Trust Co., Lawrence Mario Giannini, President of Bank of America, Neil C. Jamison, President of Jamison Mill Company, and Herbert Fisk Johnson Jr., President of S.C. Johnson & Son.

==== President Eisenhower Visit ====
In February 1954, Helms, in keeping with the goals of the Committee of Twenty-Five, hosted President Dwight D. Eisenhower and the First Lady for a seven-day vacation at his private residence in Smoke Tree Ranch. The President was met by California Governor Goodwin Knight and Palm Springs Mayor Florian Boyd. During Eisenhower's stay the Helms Smoke Tree Ranch residence became the Western White House.

== Philanthropy and interests ==
=== Helms Athletic Foundation ===
Helms and Bill Schroeder founded the Helms Athletic Foundation on October 15, 1936. Helms stated, "This foundation is dedicated to the boys and girls of the finest nation in the world."

Bill Schroeder named a national champion in college basketball from 1901 to 1982, with his selections from 1901 to 1941 being named retrospectively in 1943 and 1957. The Helms champion, for the years in which the NIT and NCAA post-season tournaments were played, reflected the winners of the 1938 NIT and 1939 NIT, as well as the winners for all years of the NCAA Tournament except for 1939, 1940, 1944 and 1954. The Foundation ceased giving a player-of-the-year award after Larry Bird during the 1978–79 season.

The organization existed until 1982 to make selections for All-America teams and national championships in college football and college basketball. All selections were made by Schroeder. When the Helms Athletic Foundation dissolved, its historical holdings were absorbed into the collection of the Amateur Athletic Foundation, renamed the LA84 Foundation in 2007.

=== Helms Hall ===
Helms provided the funding needed to operate Helms Hall. It was, as described by its sports museum's Managing Director William R. Schroeder, "housing the most complete collection of trophies, awards, sports mementos, photographs in the world" and "the most complete sports library in the world." The collection included the shoes Jesse Owens used to break three world records and tie another in 1935. It holds the largest collection of medals from shot putter Parry O'Brien and the football Coach John Heisman of Georgia Institute of Technology used to defeat Cumberland University 222 to 0 in the 1916 Cumberland vs. Georgia Tech football game. The archivist, sports librarian and record keepers answer sports questions from around the country. It possesses the last uniform worn by Babe Ruth, the one he wore as a coach for the Brooklyn Dodgers in 1938 and a torch used to start the 1936 Summer Olympics in Berlin." The Foundation funded the construction of Helms Hall for the administration and preservation of the foundation's growing sport collection. In 1948 Helms constructed a new building located at 8760 Venice Boulevard in Los Angeles. To house the sports collection, Helms Hall was built in three phases. The first phase of the two-story building was completed on October 18, 1948, at cost of more than $125,000. On November 28, 1949, a building addition completed the second phase at the cost of $150,000. The third phase addition cost in excess of $150,000.

=== Fund for Adult Education (FAE) ===
Helms served on the Board of Directors of the Fund for Adult Education (FAE) at Syracuse University for six years from its founding to his death (1951–1957). As a tribute to his service and support the FAE provide a grant to create the Paul Hoy Helms Library in Liberal Adult Education. The collection was composed of books selected by faculty and staff over the fifteen years that the grant existed. The collection is currently stored in the Ernest S. Bird Library on campus.

In referring to the Helms Library collection the 1967 Chancellor, Dr. William Pearson Tolley, stated, "I know of no other library project at Syracuse that has enlisted the continuing interest and assistance of so many members of the faculty and staff."

=== Los Angeles Memorial Coliseum "Court of Honor" ===
For his contribution to sports in Los Angeles, Helms was honored in 1956 with a Los Angeles Memorial Coliseum "Court of Honor" plaque by the Coliseum commissioners.

== Death ==
Helms died of cancer at age 67, on January 5, 1957, at his Smoke Tree Ranch home. He is buried at Forest Lawn Memorial Park in Glendale, California, on The Great Mausoleum, Holly Terrace, the Sanctuary of Celestial Peace, Mausoleum Crypt 13304.
