= John Jewett Garland =

American businessman (1902–1968)

John Jewett Garland (April 20, 1902 – November 30, 1968) was an American businessman who served as a member of the International Olympic Committee from 1948 until his death.

== Early life and career ==
Garland was born on April 20, 1902, in Los Angeles, California, the son of William May Garland and Blanche (née Hinman). He attended Hotchkiss School, a private preparatory school in Lakeville, Connecticut, and graduated from Yale University in 1925. He became president of his father's real estate business, W. M. Garland & Co.

On December 29, 1933, Garland married Helen Chandler, the daughter of Los Angeles Times publisher Harry Chandler and Marian Otis Chandler. They had two children, Gwendolyn Chandler Garland Babcock and William May Garland II.

Garland was a Republican and served as a delegate representing the state of California to many of the party's nominating conventions. He served on the boards of directors of several cultural institutions in Los Angeles, including the Los Angeles County Museum of Art, the Los Angeles Music Center, the Natural History Museum of Los Angeles County, Caltech, and the University of Southern California. During the last two years of his life, he was also a trustee of Colby College in Waterville, Maine.

== The Olympics ==
In 1920, Garland traveled alongside his father to Antwerp, Belgium, for the 1920 Summer Olympics, where the elder Garland sought to have Los Angeles named as the host city of a future Olympics. This successfully culminated in the 1932 Summer Olympics in Los Angeles. After his father was elected to the International Olympic Committee in 1922, John Garland attended many of the committee's sessions as his father's personal secretary.

William May Garland was unable to attend the 1948 Summer Olympics in London and submitted his resignation from the IOC ahead of the meeting. At the Olympics, John Garland was elected to his father's seat on the committee. The elder Garland died two months later.

As a member of the IOC, Garland was noted as a passionate defender of the principle of amateurism on which the Olympics were originally founded. He advocated for Los Angeles' frequent bids to host the Olympics again, but this was unsuccessful during his lifetime. His campaign for the 1960 Winter Olympics to be held in what is now Olympic Valley, California, was successful, and Garland was named Honorary President of those Games. He was also the honorary chairman of the Southern California Committee for the Olympic Games and a director of the U.S. Olympic Committee.

Garland died unexpectedly on November 30, 1968, at Good Samaritan Hospital in Los Angeles, at the age of 66. His seat on the IOC was not filled until 1975, when Julian Roosevelt was elected to the committee.
