= Prado Regional Park =

Park in Chino, California

Coordinates: 33.9452°N 117.6461°W

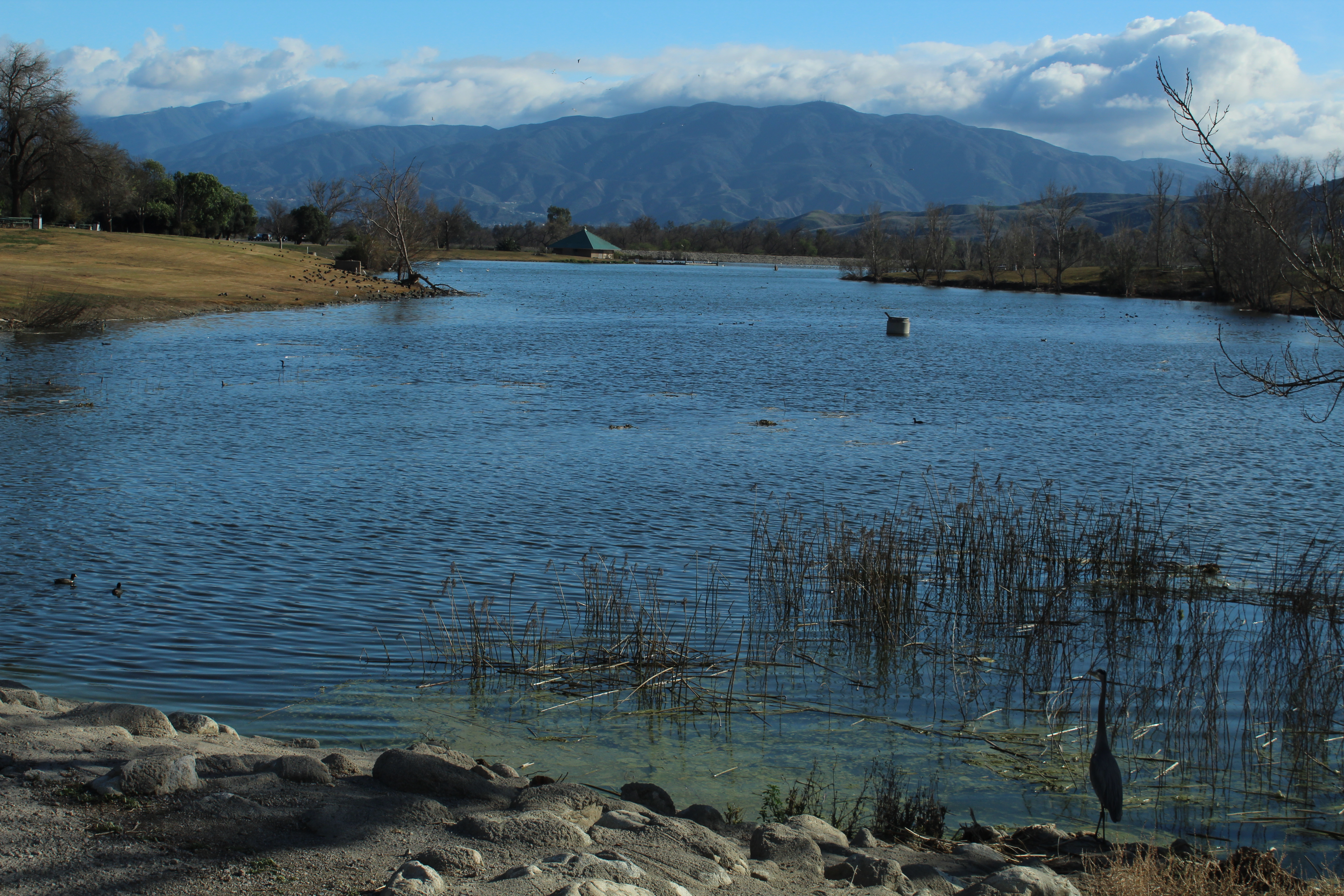
Scenic view of a lake at Prado Regional Park

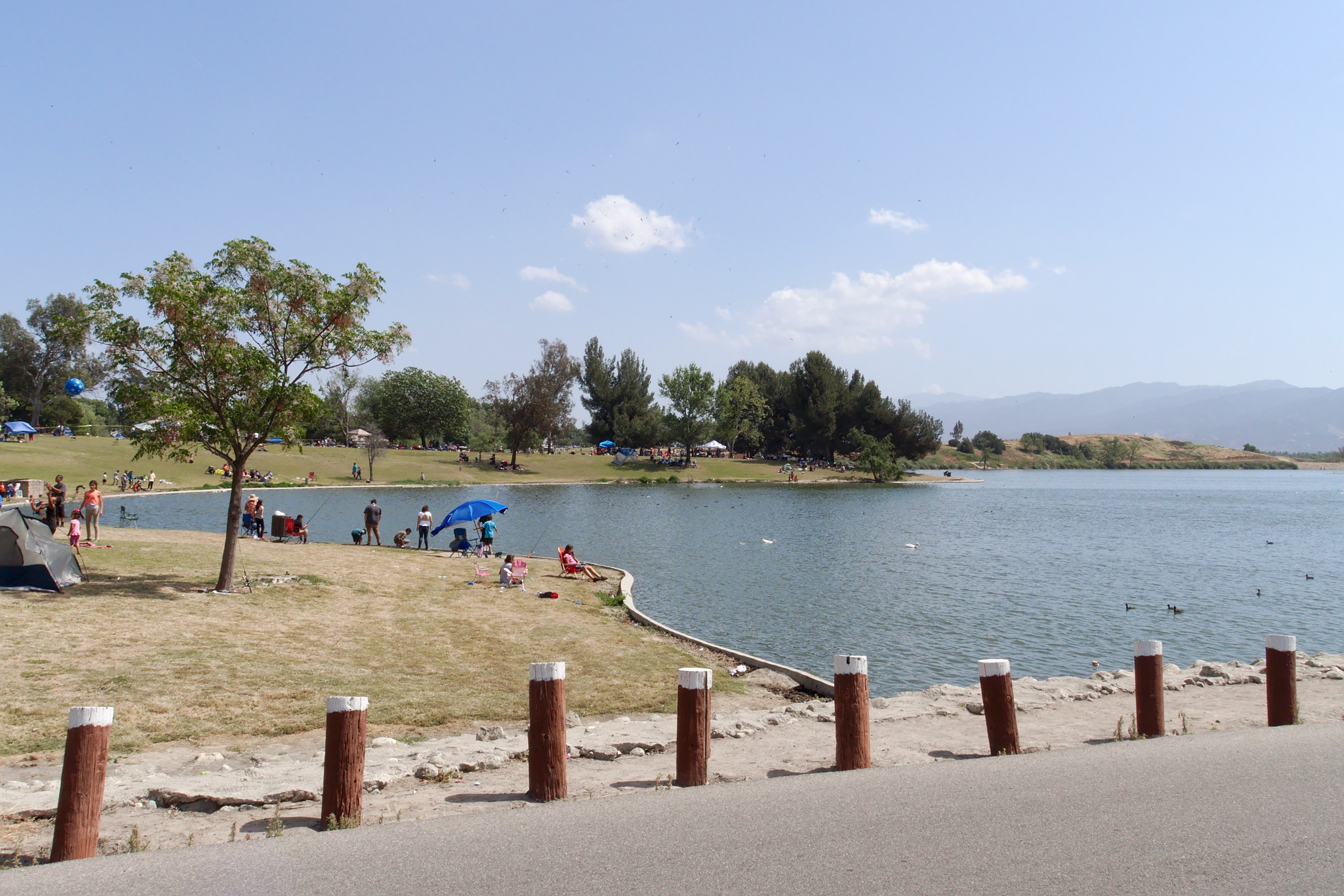
Prado Regional Park, Easter 2015

Prado Regional Park is a 2,000-acre (8.1 km^{2}) park in Chino, California within the jurisdiction of San Bernardino County. It offers fishing, archery, camping, a golf course, horseback riding, and a shooting range, which was the site of the 1984 Olympic shooting events.

The park traces its origins to the Santa Ana River floods of 1937 and 1938, which prompted the construction of the Prado Dam in 1939. A state legislative report in 1961 judged that the area around the Prado Dam did "not possess the necessary features or meet the criteria for inclusion in the State Park System." However, the report recommended a county level administration of a park. In 1972, after community efforts, the State Water Commission approved a $1.3 million grant to help construct a county regional park at the Prado Dam. Prado Park officially opened on July 2, 1976.
