= Bids for the Olympic Games =

Bids to host the Olympic Games

National Olympic Committees that wish to host an Olympic Games select cities within their territories to put forth bids for the Olympic Games. The staging of the Paralympic Games is automatically included in the bid. Since the creation of the International Olympic Committee (IOC) in 1894, which successfully appropriated the name of the Ancient Greek Olympics to create a modern sporting event, interested cities have rivaled for selection as host of the Summer or Winter Olympic Games. 51 different cities have been chosen to host the modern Olympics: three in Eastern Europe, five in East Asia, one in South America, three in Oceania, nine in North America and all the others in Western Europe. No Central American, African, Central Asian, Middle Eastern, South Asian, or Southeast Asian city has ever been chosen to host an Olympics.

The bid process has gone through multiple iterations: it has generally involved the presentation of one or more candidate cities to the delegates of the IOC, which then elect the host during an IOC Session. Beginning in 2008, prospective cities submitted an application questionnaire to the IOC, which shortlisted candidates based on their technical capability of hosting the Olympics. An IOC panel then conducted further evaluations of the candidate cities, including issuing the city a second questionnaire known as the candidature file, and in-person visits to each candidate city by members of the panel. These evaluations were used to compile reports distributed to the IOC's delegates prior to the host election.

In 2019, the bid process was overhauled to use persistent "Future Host Commissions", with which candidate cities and regions may engage in non-committal "continuous dialogue" regarding a bid for a future Olympic Games. Based on these discussions, a Future Host Commission may recommend one or more candidate cities to enter into "targeted dialogue" with the IOC to establish a formal bid.

== Bid process ==
The Olympic bid process is governed by Chapter 5, Rule 34 of the Olympic Charter, and typically consisted of the submission of bids by hosting committees to the IOC via their National Olympic Committee (NOC). The candidate cities were voted on by the IOC's members to determine the host of the Games, with the Olympic Charter originally specifying that the vote be held seven years prior to the Games. During the election for the host of the 2006 Winter Olympics, the IOC utilized an electoral college to shortlist the field to two candidates for the final vote.

The first bid system faced allegations of corruption in the 1990s (especially during the bids for the 2000 Summer Olympics and 2002 Winter Olympics), including bid committees bribing IOC delegates and their families with gifts (including expenses-paid trips to candidate cities) in an effort to sway the vote.

=== Second system ===
Following the 2002 Winter Olympics' bid scandal, the IOC modified the bid process to introduce minimum technical standards for applicant cities, a commission to formally visit and evaluate candidate cities, and reduce involvement by IOC members until the final vote (including limits on gifts, and prohibiting unnecessary travel to applicant cities by IOC members).

Beginning with the bids for the 2008 Summer Olympics, a new two-stage process was introduced. In the first phase, cities interested in hosting the Games submitted an application to the IOC via their NOC. These applicant cities were then issued a questionnaire to evaluate their capability to host the Olympics: the questionnaire covered technical criteria such as political and social support, past experience, finances, environment, and plans for infrastructure, venues, the Olympic Village, transportation, accommodations, and security. An IOC working group assigned each city a weighted-average score based on their responses to the questionnaire.

Based on these evaluations, the IOC Executive Board then shortlisted multiple candidate cities to advance to the second phase. Each bid committee submitted a more extensive questionnaire known as a "candidature file" to the IOC Evaluation Commission, a group composed of IOC members, representatives of international sport federations, NOCs, and the International Paralympic Committee, as well as athletes and international experts in various fields. The members of the Evaluation Commission then made four-day visits to each of the candidate cities, where they inspected the proposed venues and were briefed on the topics covered in the candidature file. The Evaluation Commission submitted a report to the IOC's delegates up to one month before the electing IOC Session.

The IOC Session in which a host city is elected took place in a country that did not submit an application to stage the Olympics. The election was made by the assembled active IOC members (excluding honorary and honour members), each possessing one vote. Members from countries that have a city taking part in the election could not vote while their city was in the running. The voting was conducted as a series of runoffs until one bid achieved an absolute majority of votes; if this did not happen in the first round, the bid with the fewest votes was eliminated and another voting round began. In the case of a tie for the lowest number of votes, a special runoff vote was carried out, with the winner proceeding to the next round. After each round, the eliminated bid was announced. Following the announcement of the host city, the successful bid delegation signed the "Host City Contract" with the IOC, which delegates the responsibilities of the Games organisation to the city and respective NOC.

Several bids conducted under the second system later became the subject of corruption investigations. In 2017, Brazilian investigators alleged that a US$2 million payment had been arranged in connection with efforts to secure votes for Rio de Janeiro's successful bid for the 2016 Summer Olympics. The allegations involved former Brazilian Olympic Committee president Carlos Arthur Nuzman, former Rio de Janeiro governor Sérgio Cabral, and former IOC member and IAAF president Lamine Diack. In 2024, a Brazilian federal court annulled related convictions after finding that the judge lacked legal competence to rule on the case.

The successful Tokyo 2020 bid also became the subject of scrutiny. Reuters reported in 2020 that marketing agency Dentsu had donated more than US$6 million to the bid campaign and lobbied IOC members on Tokyo's behalf, creating what Reuters described as a potential conflict of interest because the company also had a separate commercial relationship with the IOC.

=== Third system ===
At the 134th IOC Session on 24 June 2019 in Lausanne, the IOC ratified a new Olympic bid process based on the recommendations of Olympic Agenda 2020. The new process establishes Future Host Commissions (FHCs) for the Summer and Winter Olympics respectively. Cities and regions interested in hosting a future Olympic Games enter into non-committal "continuous dialogue" with the FHC. As a result of continuous dialogue, the FHC may recommend one or more preferred host(s) to enter into "targeted dialogue" with the IOC Executive Board to negotiate a formal bid for a specific Olympic Games. Following targeted dialogue, the candidate(s) are then elected via a referendum to the IOC's delegates.

The new process was described as being more "consultative" and emphasizing flexibility for hosts and sustainability; president Thomas Bach explained that the IOC needed to "keep up with the fast pace of change in our current world", and that "flexibility is a necessity to ensure good governance and to have sustainable Olympic Games in the future", while "maintaining the magic of the Games, the fundamental principle of universality and our commitment to having athletes at the centre of everything we do." The process was employed for the first time during the bids for the 2032 Summer Olympics; German officials, including Bundestag sports committee chairwoman Dagmar Freitag, criticized the new system for lacking transparency after Brisbane was chosen as sole candidate over Rhine-Ruhr.

In June 2025, shortly after succeeding Bach as IOC president, Kirsty Coventry announced a pause and review of the future-host election process. Reuters reported that IOC members had called for greater involvement in host selection and that, under Bach's leadership, the IOC Executive Board had presented a single preferred candidate to members for approval. The IOC established a working group to review the process.

Associated amendments to the Olympic Charter also allow for more flexibility in when the electing session is held, and also enable bids to formally consist of one or more cities, regions, or countries rather than only cities. This strategy became apparent when the 2030 Winter Olympics were awarded to the French Alps, and the 2034 Winter Olympics' were billed as "Salt Lake City—Utah 2024" and, later "Utah 2034", to emphasize the Games' use of venues outside of Salt Lake City (as opposed to the 2002 Winter Olympics, which were billed as simply "Salt Lake 2002").

In June 2026, the IOC Executive Board proposed the addition of a "strategic dialogue" phase between the two existing phases, which would provide additional opportunities for the Board to evaluate proposals extended by the Future Host Commission.

== IOC – IPC co-operation ==
Even with completely different stories, but with common goals, the approach to the Paralympic Games that began in the late 1980s and progressively evolved into a joint organization made during the 1992 Summer Paralympics, held in Barcelona and Madrid, Spain, the 1994 Winter Paralympics held in Lillehammer, Norway, the 1998 Winter Paralympics held in Nagano, Japan, and the 2000 Summer Paralympic Games were the bridges to the International Olympic Committee (IOC) and the International Paralympic Committee (IPC) to sign in June 2001, an agreement that would ensure that the staging of the Paralympic Games is automatically included in the bid for the Olympic Games starting from the bid process for the 2008 Summer Paralympics. However, the Salt Lake 2002 Organizing Committee (SLOC) and Athens 2004 Organizing Committee (ATHOC) instead chose to follow the practice of "one bid, one city" for both events. The agreement was adjusted in 2003 and their first extension was signed in June 2006.

== Games of the Olympiad ==
=== First system era ===
Games	Year	Bid party		Result	Final selection process		Note
Games	Year	City	NOCs	Result	Date	IOC Session	Note
I	1896	Athens	Greece	Awarded to host the Games of the I Olympiad (sole bid)	23 June 1894	1st in Paris, France	(Note: At the first Session of the International Olympic Committee, in 1894, Athens was chosen to stage the first Olympic Games of the Modern Era, in 1896, as an honour to the birthplace of the Ancient Olympics. Paris was chosen as the site for the II Olympiad, in 1900, despite Pierre de Coubertin's wish that Paris would celebrate the first Games.)
II	1900	Paris	France	Awarded to host the Games of the II Olympiad (sole bid)	23 June 1894	1st in Paris, France	
III	1904	~~Chicago~~	United States	Awarded to host the Games of the III Olympiad (moved to St. Louis)	22 May 1901	4th in Paris, France	(Note: Originally awarded to Chicago, but moved to St. Louis to coincide with the World's Fair.)
III	1904	St. Louis	United States	Inherently awarded to host the Games of the III Olympiad	22 May 1901	4th in Paris, France	(Note: Originally awarded to Chicago, but moved to St. Louis to coincide with the World's Fair.)
IV	1908	~~Rome~~	~~Italy~~	Awarded to host the Games of the IV Olympiad (reattributed)	June 1904	6th in London	(Note: Rome was the choice of the IOC, but the 1906 eruption of Mount Vesuvius forced the Italians to return the Games to the IOC, which reattributed them to London.)
IV	1908	London	United Kingdom	Inherently awarded to host the Games of the IV Olympiad	June 1904	6th in London	(Note: Rome was the choice of the IOC, but the 1906 eruption of Mount Vesuvius forced the Italians to return the Games to the IOC, which reattributed them to London.)
IV	1908	Berlin	(German Empire) Germany	Not selected to host the Games	June 1904	6th in London	(Note: Rome was the choice of the IOC, but the 1906 eruption of Mount Vesuvius forced the Italians to return the Games to the IOC, which reattributed them to London.)
IV	1908	Milan	Italy	Not selected to host the Games	June 1904	6th in London	(Note: Rome was the choice of the IOC, but the 1906 eruption of Mount Vesuvius forced the Italians to return the Games to the IOC, which reattributed them to London.)
V	1912	Stockholm	Sweden	Awarded to host the Games of the V Olympiad (sole bid)	27 May 1909	10th in Berlin, Germany	
~~VI~~	~~1916~~	~~Berlin~~	~~Germany~~	Awarded to host the Games of the VI Olympiad (cancelled)	27 May 1912	14th in Stockholm, Sweden	(Note: The Games were cancelled because of World War I.)
~~VI~~	~~1916~~	Alexandria	Egypt	Not selected to host the Games	27 May 1912	14th in Stockholm, Sweden	(Note: The Games were cancelled because of World War I.)
~~VI~~	~~1916~~	Amsterdam	Netherlands	Not selected to host the Games	27 May 1912	14th in Stockholm, Sweden	(Note: The Games were cancelled because of World War I.)
~~VI~~	~~1916~~	Brussels	Belgium	Not selected to host the Games	27 May 1912	14th in Stockholm, Sweden	(Note: The Games were cancelled because of World War I.)
~~VI~~	~~1916~~	Budapest	Hungary	Not selected to host the Games	27 May 1912	14th in Stockholm, Sweden	(Note: The Games were cancelled because of World War I.)
~~VI~~	~~1916~~	Cleveland	United States	Not selected to host the Games	27 May 1912	14th in Stockholm, Sweden	(Note: The Games were cancelled because of World War I.)
VII	1920	Antwerp	Belgium	Awarded to host the Games of the VII Olympiad	5 April 1919	17th in Lausanne, Switzerland	(Note: Antwerp was awarded with the Olympic Games as a compensation and to honour the Belgians who fought, suffered and died during the war.)
VII	1920	Amsterdam	Netherlands	Not selected to host the Games	5 April 1919	17th in Lausanne, Switzerland	(Note: Antwerp was awarded with the Olympic Games as a compensation and to honour the Belgians who fought, suffered and died during the war.)
VII	1920	Atlanta	United States	Not selected to host the Games	5 April 1919	17th in Lausanne, Switzerland	(Note: Antwerp was awarded with the Olympic Games as a compensation and to honour the Belgians who fought, suffered and died during the war.)
VII	1920	Budapest	Hungary	Not selected to host the Games	5 April 1919	17th in Lausanne, Switzerland	(Note: Antwerp was awarded with the Olympic Games as a compensation and to honour the Belgians who fought, suffered and died during the war.)
VII	1920	Cleveland	United States	Not selected to host the Games	5 April 1919	17th in Lausanne, Switzerland	(Note: Antwerp was awarded with the Olympic Games as a compensation and to honour the Belgians who fought, suffered and died during the war.)
VII	1920	Havana	Cuba	Not selected to host the Games	5 April 1919	17th in Lausanne, Switzerland	(Note: Antwerp was awarded with the Olympic Games as a compensation and to honour the Belgians who fought, suffered and died during the war.)
VII	1920	Philadelphia	United States	Not selected to host the Games	5 April 1919	17th in Lausanne, Switzerland	(Note: Antwerp was awarded with the Olympic Games as a compensation and to honour the Belgians who fought, suffered and died during the war.)
VII	1920	Lyon	France	Withdrew during the host selection process	5 April 1919	17th in Lausanne, Switzerland	(Note: Antwerp was awarded with the Olympic Games as a compensation and to honour the Belgians who fought, suffered and died during the war.)
VIII	1924	Paris	France	Awarded to host the Games of the VIII Olympiad	2 June 1921	19th in Lausanne, Switzerland	(Note: Paris got the Games for the second time to fulfill Pierre de Coubertin's wish to see a successful Olympics in his country, erasing the flaws of the 1900 Olympics, before he retired from the IOC.)
VIII	1924	Amsterdam	Netherlands	Not selected to host the Games	2 June 1921	19th in Lausanne, Switzerland	(Note: Paris got the Games for the second time to fulfill Pierre de Coubertin's wish to see a successful Olympics in his country, erasing the flaws of the 1900 Olympics, before he retired from the IOC.)
VIII	1924	Barcelona	Spain	Not selected to host the Games	2 June 1921	19th in Lausanne, Switzerland	(Note: Paris got the Games for the second time to fulfill Pierre de Coubertin's wish to see a successful Olympics in his country, erasing the flaws of the 1900 Olympics, before he retired from the IOC.)
VIII	1924	Los Angeles	United States	Not selected to host the Games	2 June 1921	19th in Lausanne, Switzerland	(Note: Paris got the Games for the second time to fulfill Pierre de Coubertin's wish to see a successful Olympics in his country, erasing the flaws of the 1900 Olympics, before he retired from the IOC.)
VIII	1924	Prague	Czechoslovakia	Not selected to host the Games	2 June 1921	19th in Lausanne, Switzerland	(Note: Paris got the Games for the second time to fulfill Pierre de Coubertin's wish to see a successful Olympics in his country, erasing the flaws of the 1900 Olympics, before he retired from the IOC.)
VIII	1924	Rome	Italy	Not selected to host the Games	2 June 1921	19th in Lausanne, Switzerland	(Note: Paris got the Games for the second time to fulfill Pierre de Coubertin's wish to see a successful Olympics in his country, erasing the flaws of the 1900 Olympics, before he retired from the IOC.)
IX	1928	Amsterdam	Netherlands	Awarded to host the Games of the IX Olympiad	2 June 1921	19th in Lausanne, Switzerland	
IX	1928	Los Angeles	United States	Not selected to host the Games	2 June 1921	19th in Lausanne, Switzerland	
X	1932	Los Angeles	United States	Awarded to host the Games of the X Olympiad (sole bid)	9 April 1923	21st in Rome, Italy	
XI	1936	Berlin	Germany	Awarded to host the Games of the XI Olympiad (43 votes)	13 May 1931	29th in Barcelona, Spain	
XI	1936	Barcelona	Spain	Eliminated in the first voting (16 votes)	13 May 1931	29th in Barcelona, Spain	
XI	1936	Alexandria	Egypt	Withdrew during the host selection process	13 May 1931	29th in Barcelona, Spain	
XI	1936	Budapest	Hungary	Withdrew during the host selection process	13 May 1931	29th in Barcelona, Spain	
XI	1936	Buenos Aires	Argentina	Withdrew during the host selection process	13 May 1931	29th in Barcelona, Spain	
XI	1936	Cologne	Germany	Withdrew during the host selection process	13 May 1931	29th in Barcelona, Spain	
XI	1936	Dublin	Ireland	Withdrew during the host selection process	13 May 1931	29th in Barcelona, Spain	
XI	1936	Frankfurt	Germany	Withdrew during the host selection process	13 May 1931	29th in Barcelona, Spain	
XI	1936	Helsinki	Finland	Withdrew during the host selection process	13 May 1931	29th in Barcelona, Spain	
XI	1936	Lausanne	Switzerland	Withdrew during the host selection process	13 May 1931	29th in Barcelona, Spain	
XI	1936	Montevideo	Uruguay	Withdrew during the host selection process	13 May 1931	29th in Barcelona, Spain	
XI	1936	Nuremberg	Germany	Withdrew during the host selection process	13 May 1931	29th in Barcelona, Spain	
XI	1936	Rio de Janeiro	Brazil	Withdrew during the host selection process	13 May 1931	29th in Barcelona, Spain	
XI	1936	Rome	Italy	Withdrew during the host selection process	13 May 1931	29th in Barcelona, Spain	
~~XII~~	~~1940~~	~~Tokyo~~	~~Japan~~	Awarded to host the Games of the XII Olympiad (relinquished)	31 July 1936	35th in Berlin, Germany	(Note: Due to the outbreak of the Second Sino-Japanese War, Japan relinquished its hosting rights to both the Summer and Winter Games. On 1938-07-15, the IOC relocated the Summer Games to Helsinki and the Winter Games to St. Moritz. Finland's invasion by the Soviet Union, in 1939, and World War II forced the IOC to cancel the 1940 Summer Games. Disagreements with the Swiss officials, concerning the entry of professional skiers in the Games, prompted the IOC to reattribute them for the second consecutive time to Garmisch-Partenkirchen, on 1939-06-09. They were cancelled as well because of the war.)
~~XII~~	~~1940~~	~~Helsinki~~	~~Finland~~	Inherently awarded to host the Games of the XII Olympiad (cancelled)	31 July 1936	35th in Berlin, Germany	
~~XII~~	~~1940~~	Barcelona	Spain	Not selected to host the Games	31 July 1936	35th in Berlin, Germany	
~~XII~~	~~1940~~	Rome	Italy	Not selected to host the Games	31 July 1936	35th in Berlin, Germany	
~~XIII~~	~~1944~~	~~London~~	~~United Kingdom~~	Awarded to host the Games of the XIII Olympiad (20 votes; cancelled)	9 June 1939	38th in London	(Note: The Games were cancelled because of World War II.)
~~XIII~~	~~1944~~	Rome	Italy	Eliminated in the first voting (11 votes)	9 June 1939	38th in London	(Note: The Games were cancelled because of World War II.)
~~XIII~~	~~1944~~	Detroit	United States	Eliminated in the first voting (2 votes)	9 June 1939	38th in London	(Note: The Games were cancelled because of World War II.)
~~XIII~~	~~1944~~	Lausanne	Switzerland	Eliminated in the first voting (1 vote)	9 June 1939	38th in London	(Note: The Games were cancelled because of World War II.)
~~XIII~~	~~1944~~	Athens	Greece	Eliminated in the first voting (no vote)	9 June 1939	38th in London	(Note: The Games were cancelled because of World War II.)
~~XIII~~	~~1944~~	Budapest	Hungary	Eliminated in the first voting (no vote)	9 June 1939	38th in London	(Note: The Games were cancelled because of World War II.)
~~XIII~~	~~1944~~	Helsinki	Finland	Eliminated in the first voting (no vote)	9 June 1939	38th in London	(Note: The Games were cancelled because of World War II.)
~~XIII~~	~~1944~~	Montreal	Canada	Eliminated in the first voting (no vote)	9 June 1939	38th in London	(Note: The Games were cancelled because of World War II.)
XIV	1948	London	United Kingdom	Awarded to host the Games of the XIV Olympiad	September 1946	39th in Lausanne, Switzerland	(Note: Selected without election, after the end of World War II.)
XIV	1948	Lausanne	Switzerland	Not selected to host the Games	September 1946	39th in Lausanne, Switzerland	(Note: Selected without election, after the end of World War II.)
XIV	1948	Los Angeles	United States	Not selected to host the Games	September 1946	39th in Lausanne, Switzerland	(Note: Selected without election, after the end of World War II.)
XIV	1948	Minneapolis	United States	Not selected to host the Games	September 1946	39th in Lausanne, Switzerland	(Note: Selected without election, after the end of World War II.)
XIV	1948	Philadelphia	United States	Not selected to host the Games	September 1946	39th in Lausanne, Switzerland	(Note: Selected without election, after the end of World War II.)
XIV	1948	Baltimore	United States	Not selected to host the Games	September 1946	39th in Lausanne, Switzerland	(Note: Selected without election, after the end of World War II.)
XV	1952	Helsinki	Finland	Awarded to host the Games of the XV Olympiad (15 votes)	21 June 1947	40th in Stockholm, Sweden	
XV	1952	Minneapolis	United States	Eliminated in the second voting (5 votes)	21 June 1947	40th in Stockholm, Sweden	
XV	1952	Los Angeles	United States	Eliminated in the second voting (5 votes)	21 June 1947	40th in Stockholm, Sweden	
XV	1952	Amsterdam	Netherlands	Eliminated in the second voting (3 votes)	21 June 1947	40th in Stockholm, Sweden	
XV	1952	Detroit	United States	Eliminated in the first voting (2 votes)	21 June 1947	40th in Stockholm, Sweden	
XV	1952	Chicago	United States	Eliminated in the first voting (1 vote)	21 June 1947	40th in Stockholm, Sweden	
XV	1952	Philadelphia	United States	Eliminated in the first voting (no vote)	21 June 1947	40th in Stockholm, Sweden	
XVI	1956	Melbourne	Australia	Awarded to host the Games of the XVI Olympiad (21 votes)	28 April 1949	43rd in Rome, Italy	(Note: Australia's strict quarantine laws concerning the entry of foreign horses made it impossible for the equestrian events to be held within the Games period. In May, 1954, during the 49th IOC Session in Athens, Stockholm was chosen to stage what would be known as "Equestrian Games of the XVIth Olympiad".)
XVI	1956	Buenos Aires	Argentina	Eliminated in the fourth voting (20 votes)	28 April 1949	43rd in Rome, Italy	(Note: Australia's strict quarantine laws concerning the entry of foreign horses made it impossible for the equestrian events to be held within the Games period. In May, 1954, during the 49th IOC Session in Athens, Stockholm was chosen to stage what would be known as "Equestrian Games of the XVIth Olympiad".)
XVI	1956	Los Angeles	United States	Eliminated in the third voting (5 votes)	28 April 1949	43rd in Rome, Italy	(Note: Australia's strict quarantine laws concerning the entry of foreign horses made it impossible for the equestrian events to be held within the Games period. In May, 1954, during the 49th IOC Session in Athens, Stockholm was chosen to stage what would be known as "Equestrian Games of the XVIth Olympiad".)
XVI	1956	Detroit	United States	Eliminated in the third voting (4 votes)	28 April 1949	43rd in Rome, Italy	(Note: Australia's strict quarantine laws concerning the entry of foreign horses made it impossible for the equestrian events to be held within the Games period. In May, 1954, during the 49th IOC Session in Athens, Stockholm was chosen to stage what would be known as "Equestrian Games of the XVIth Olympiad".)
XVI	1956	Mexico City	Mexico	Eliminated in the second voting (3 votes)	28 April 1949	43rd in Rome, Italy	(Note: Australia's strict quarantine laws concerning the entry of foreign horses made it impossible for the equestrian events to be held within the Games period. In May, 1954, during the 49th IOC Session in Athens, Stockholm was chosen to stage what would be known as "Equestrian Games of the XVIth Olympiad".)
XVI	1956	Chicago	United States	Eliminated in the first voting (1 vote)	28 April 1949	43rd in Rome, Italy	(Note: Australia's strict quarantine laws concerning the entry of foreign horses made it impossible for the equestrian events to be held within the Games period. In May, 1954, during the 49th IOC Session in Athens, Stockholm was chosen to stage what would be known as "Equestrian Games of the XVIth Olympiad".)
XVI	1956	Minneapolis	United States	Eliminated in the first voting (1 vote)	28 April 1949	43rd in Rome, Italy	(Note: Australia's strict quarantine laws concerning the entry of foreign horses made it impossible for the equestrian events to be held within the Games period. In May, 1954, during the 49th IOC Session in Athens, Stockholm was chosen to stage what would be known as "Equestrian Games of the XVIth Olympiad".)
XVI	1956	Philadelphia	United States	Eliminated in the first voting (1 vote)	28 April 1949	43rd in Rome, Italy	(Note: Australia's strict quarantine laws concerning the entry of foreign horses made it impossible for the equestrian events to be held within the Games period. In May, 1954, during the 49th IOC Session in Athens, Stockholm was chosen to stage what would be known as "Equestrian Games of the XVIth Olympiad".)
XVI	1956	San Francisco	United States	Eliminated in the first voting (no vote)	28 April 1949	43rd in Rome, Italy	(Note: Australia's strict quarantine laws concerning the entry of foreign horses made it impossible for the equestrian events to be held within the Games period. In May, 1954, during the 49th IOC Session in Athens, Stockholm was chosen to stage what would be known as "Equestrian Games of the XVIth Olympiad".)
XVI	1956	Montreal	Canada	Eliminated in the first voting (no vote)	28 April 1949	43rd in Rome, Italy	(Note: Australia's strict quarantine laws concerning the entry of foreign horses made it impossible for the equestrian events to be held within the Games period. In May, 1954, during the 49th IOC Session in Athens, Stockholm was chosen to stage what would be known as "Equestrian Games of the XVIth Olympiad".)
XVII	1960	Rome	Italy	Awarded to host the Games of the XVII Olympiad (35 votes)	15 June 1955	50th in Paris, France	
XVII	1960	Lausanne	Switzerland	Eliminated in the third voting (24 votes)	15 June 1955	50th in Paris, France	
XVII	1960	Detroit	United States	Eliminated in the second voting (11 votes)	15 June 1955	50th in Paris, France	
XVII	1960	Budapest	Hungary	Eliminated in the second voting (1 vote)	15 June 1955	50th in Paris, France	
XVII	1960	Brussels	Belgium	Eliminated in the first voting (6 votes)	15 June 1955	50th in Paris, France	
XVII	1960	Mexico City	Mexico	Eliminated in the first voting (6 votes)	15 June 1955	50th in Paris, France	
XVII	1960	Tokyo	Japan	Eliminated in the first voting (4 votes)	15 June 1955	50th in Paris, France	
XVIII	1964	Tokyo	Japan	Awarded to host the Games of the XVIII Olympiad (34 votes)	26 May 1959	55th in Munich, Germany	
XVIII	1964	Detroit	United States	Eliminated in the first voting (10 votes)	26 May 1959	55th in Munich, Germany	
XVIII	1964	Vienna	Austria	Eliminated in the first voting (9 votes)	26 May 1959	55th in Munich, Germany	
XVIII	1964	Brussels	Belgium	Eliminated in the first voting (5 votes)	26 May 1959	55th in Munich, Germany	
XIX	1968	Mexico City	Mexico	Awarded to host the Games of the XIX Olympiad (30 votes)	18 October 1963	60th in Baden-Baden, Germany	
XIX	1968	Detroit	United States	Eliminated in the first voting (14 votes)	18 October 1963	60th in Baden-Baden, Germany	
XIX	1968	Lyon	France	Eliminated in the first voting (12 votes)	18 October 1963	60th in Baden-Baden, Germany	
XIX	1968	Buenos Aires	Argentina	Eliminated in the first voting (2 votes)	18 October 1963	60th in Baden-Baden, Germany	
XX	1972	Munich	Germany	Awarded to host the Games of the XX Olympiad (31 votes)	26 April 1966	64th in Rome, Italy	
XX	1972	Madrid	Spain	Eliminated in the second voting (16 votes)	26 April 1966	64th in Rome, Italy	
XX	1972	Montreal	Canada	Eliminated in the second voting (13 votes)	26 April 1966	64th in Rome, Italy	
XX	1972	Detroit	United States	Eliminated in the first voting (6 votes)	26 April 1966	64th in Rome, Italy	
XXI	1976	Montreal	Canada	Awarded to host the Games of the XXI Olympiad (41 votes)	12 May 1970	69th in Amsterdam, Netherlands	
XXI	1976	Moscow	Soviet Union	Eliminated in the second voting (28 votes)	12 May 1970	69th in Amsterdam, Netherlands	
XXI	1976	Los Angeles	United States	Eliminated in the first voting (17 votes)	12 May 1970	69th in Amsterdam, Netherlands	
XXII	1980	Moscow	Soviet Union	Awarded to host the Games of the XXII Olympiad (39 votes)	23 October 1974	75th in Vienna, Austria	
XXII	1980	Los Angeles	United States	Eliminated in the first voting (20 votes)	23 October 1974	75th in Vienna, Austria	
XXIII	1984	Los Angeles	United States	Awarded to host the Games of the XXIII Olympiad (sole bid)	18 May 1978	80th in Athens, Greece	
XXIII	1984	Tehran	Iran	Did not advance	18 May 1978	80th in Athens, Greece	
XXIV	1988	Seoul	South Korea	Awarded to host the Games of the XXIV Olympiad (52 votes)	30 September 1981	84th in Baden-Baden, Germany	
XXIV	1988	Nagoya	Japan	Eliminated in the first voting (27 votes)	30 September 1981	84th in Baden-Baden, Germany	
XXV	1992	Barcelona	Spain	Awarded to host the Games of the XXV Olympiad (47 votes)	17 October 1986	91st in Lausanne, Switzerland	
XXV	1992	Paris	France	Eliminated in the third voting (23 votes)	17 October 1986	91st in Lausanne, Switzerland	
XXV	1992	Brisbane	Australia	Eliminated in the third voting (10 votes)	17 October 1986	91st in Lausanne, Switzerland	
XXV	1992	Belgrade	Yugoslavia	Eliminated in the third voting (5 votes)	17 October 1986	91st in Lausanne, Switzerland	
XXV	1992	Birmingham	United Kingdom	Eliminated in the second voting (8 votes)	17 October 1986	91st in Lausanne, Switzerland	
XXV	1992	Amsterdam	Netherlands	Eliminated in the first voting (5 votes)	17 October 1986	91st in Lausanne, Switzerland	
XXVI	1996	Atlanta	United States	Awarded to host the Games of the XXVI Olympiad (51 votes)	18 September 1990	96th in Tokyo, Japan	
XXVI	1996	Athens	Greece	Eliminated in the fifth voting (35 votes)	18 September 1990	96th in Tokyo, Japan	
XXVI	1996	Toronto	Canada	Eliminated in the fourth voting (22 votes)	18 September 1990	96th in Tokyo, Japan	
XXVI	1996	Melbourne	Australia	Eliminated in the third voting (16 votes)	18 September 1990	96th in Tokyo, Japan	
XXVI	1996	Manchester	United Kingdom	Eliminated in the second voting (5 votes)	18 September 1990	96th in Tokyo, Japan	
XXVI	1996	Belgrade	Yugoslavia	Eliminated in the first voting (7 votes)	18 September 1990	96th in Tokyo, Japan	
XXVII	2000	Sydney	Australia	Awarded to host the Games of the XXVII Olympiad (45 votes)	23 September 1993	101st in Monte Carlo, Monaco	
XXVII	2000	Beijing	China	Eliminated in the fourth voting (43 votes)	23 September 1993	101st in Monte Carlo, Monaco	
XXVII	2000	Manchester	United Kingdom	Eliminated in the third voting (11 votes)	23 September 1993	101st in Monte Carlo, Monaco	
XXVII	2000	Berlin	Germany	Eliminated in the second voting (9 votes)	23 September 1993	101st in Monte Carlo, Monaco	
XXVII	2000	Istanbul	Turkey	Eliminated in the first voting (7 votes)	23 September 1993	101st in Monte Carlo, Monaco	
XXVII	2000	Brasília	Brazil	Withdrew during the host selection process	23 September 1993	101st in Monte Carlo, Monaco	
XXVII	2000	Milan	Italy	Withdrew during the host selection process	23 September 1993	101st in Monte Carlo, Monaco	
XXVII	2000	Tashkent	Uzbekistan	Withdrew during the host selection process	23 September 1993	101st in Monte Carlo, Monaco	

=== Second system era ===
Games	Year	Bid party (Candidate/Applicant city)		Result	Final selection process		Note
Games	Year	City	NOCs	Result	Date	IOC Session	Note
XXVIII	2004	Athens	Greece	Awarded to host the Games of the XXVIII Olympiad (66 votes)	9 May 1997	106th in Lausanne, Switzerland	
XXVIII	2004	Rome	Italy	Eliminated in the fourth voting (41 votes)	9 May 1997	106th in Lausanne, Switzerland	
XXVIII	2004	Cape Town	South Africa	Eliminated in the third voting (20 votes)	9 May 1997	106th in Lausanne, Switzerland	
XXVIII	2004	Stockholm	Sweden	Eliminated in the second voting (19 votes)	9 May 1997	106th in Lausanne, Switzerland	
XXVIII	2004	Buenos Aires	Argentina	Eliminated in the run-off voting (44 votes)	9 May 1997	106th in Lausanne, Switzerland	
XXVIII	2004	Istanbul	Turkey	Not shortlisted to the candidature stage	9 May 1997	106th in Lausanne, Switzerland	
XXVIII	2004	Lille	France	Not shortlisted to the candidature stage	9 May 1997	106th in Lausanne, Switzerland	
XXVIII	2004	Rio de Janeiro	Brazil	Not shortlisted to the candidature stage	9 May 1997	106th in Lausanne, Switzerland	
XXVIII	2004	Saint Petersburg	Russia	Not shortlisted to the candidature stage	9 May 1997	106th in Lausanne, Switzerland	
XXVIII	2004	San Juan	Puerto Rico	Not shortlisted to the candidature stage	9 May 1997	106th in Lausanne, Switzerland	
XXVIII	2004	Seville	Spain	Not shortlisted to the candidature stage	9 May 1997	106th in Lausanne, Switzerland	
XXIX	2008	Beijing	China	Awarded to host the Games of the XXIX Olympiad (56 votes)	13 July 2001	112th in Moscow, Russia	
XXIX	2008	Toronto	Canada	Eliminated in the second voting (22 votes)	13 July 2001	112th in Moscow, Russia	
XXIX	2008	Paris	France	Eliminated in the second voting (18 votes)	13 July 2001	112th in Moscow, Russia	
XXIX	2008	Istanbul	Turkey	Eliminated in the second voting (9 votes)	13 July 2001	112th in Moscow, Russia	
XXIX	2008	Osaka	Japan	Eliminated in the first voting (6 votes)	13 July 2001	112th in Moscow, Russia	
XXIX	2008	Bangkok	Thailand	Not shortlisted to the candidature stage	13 July 2001	112th in Moscow, Russia	
XXIX	2008	Cairo	Egypt	Not shortlisted to the candidature stage	13 July 2001	112th in Moscow, Russia	
XXIX	2008	Havana	Cuba	Not shortlisted to the candidature stage	13 July 2001	112th in Moscow, Russia	
XXIX	2008	Kuala Lumpur	Malaysia	Not shortlisted to the candidature stage	13 July 2001	112th in Moscow, Russia	
XXIX	2008	Seville	Spain	Not shortlisted to the candidature stage	13 July 2001	112th in Moscow, Russia	
XXX	2012	London	United Kingdom	Awarded to host the Games of the XXX Olympiad (54 votes)	6 July 2005	117th in Singapore	
XXX	2012	Paris	France	Eliminated in the fourth voting (50 votes)	6 July 2005	117th in Singapore	
XXX	2012	Madrid	Spain	Eliminated in the third voting (31 votes)	6 July 2005	117th in Singapore	
XXX	2012	New York City	United States	Eliminated in the second voting (16 votes)	6 July 2005	117th in Singapore	
XXX	2012	Moscow	Russia	Eliminated in the first voting (15 votes)	6 July 2005	117th in Singapore	
XXX	2012	Istanbul	Turkey	Not shortlisted to the candidature stage	6 July 2005	117th in Singapore	
XXX	2012	Leipzig	Germany	Not shortlisted to the candidature stage	6 July 2005	117th in Singapore	
XXX	2012	Rio de Janeiro	Brazil	Not shortlisted to the candidature stage	6 July 2005	117th in Singapore	
XXX	2012	Havana	Cuba	Not shortlisted to the candidature stage	6 July 2005	117th in Singapore	
XXXI	2016	Rio de Janeiro	Brazil	Awarded to host the Games of the XXXI Olympiad (66 votes)	2 October 2009	121st in Copenhagen, Denmark	
XXXI	2016	Madrid	Spain	Eliminated in the third voting (32 votes)	2 October 2009	121st in Copenhagen, Denmark	
XXXI	2016	Tokyo	Japan	Eliminated in the second voting (20 votes)	2 October 2009	121st in Copenhagen, Denmark	
XXXI	2016	Chicago	United States	Eliminated in the first voting (18 votes)	2 October 2009	121st in Copenhagen, Denmark	
XXXI	2016	Baku	Azerbaijan	Not shortlisted to the candidature stage	2 October 2009	121st in Copenhagen, Denmark	
XXXI	2016	Doha	Qatar	Not shortlisted to the candidature stage	2 October 2009	121st in Copenhagen, Denmark	
XXXI	2016	Prague	Czech Republic	Not shortlisted to the candidature stage	2 October 2009	121st in Copenhagen, Denmark	
XXXII	2020	Tokyo	Japan	Awarded to host the Games of the XXXII Olympiad (60 votes)	7 September 2013	125th in Buenos Aires, Argentina	(Note: The Games were postponed to 2021 due to the COVID-19 pandemic.)
XXXII	2020	Istanbul	Turkey	Eliminated in the second voting (36 votes)	7 September 2013	125th in Buenos Aires, Argentina	(Note: The Games were postponed to 2021 due to the COVID-19 pandemic.)
XXXII	2020	Madrid	Spain	Eliminated in the run-off voting (49 votes)	7 September 2013	125th in Buenos Aires, Argentina	(Note: The Games were postponed to 2021 due to the COVID-19 pandemic.)
XXXII	2020	Baku	Azerbaijan	Not shortlisted to the candidature stage	7 September 2013	125th in Buenos Aires, Argentina	(Note: The Games were postponed to 2021 due to the COVID-19 pandemic.)
XXXII	2020	Doha	Qatar	Not shortlisted to the candidature stage	7 September 2013	125th in Buenos Aires, Argentina	(Note: The Games were postponed to 2021 due to the COVID-19 pandemic.)
XXXII	2020	Rome	Italy	Not shortlisted to the candidature stage	7 September 2013	125th in Buenos Aires, Argentina	(Note: The Games were postponed to 2021 due to the COVID-19 pandemic.)
XXXIII & XXXIV	2024 & 2028	Paris	France	Awarded to host the Games of the XXXIII Olympiad (unanimous vote)	13 September 2017	131st in Lima, Peru	(Note: Los Angeles' bid was withdrawn on July 31, 2017 as a prerequisite to being awarded 2028, leaving Paris as the only bidder. The USOC initially picked Boston as the US candidate but later withdrew their bid in favor of Los Angeles.)
XXXIII & XXXIV	2024 & 2028	Los Angeles	United States	Awarded to host the Games of the XXXIV Olympiad (unanimous vote)	13 September 2017	131st in Lima, Peru	(Note: Los Angeles' bid was withdrawn on July 31, 2017 as a prerequisite to being awarded 2028, leaving Paris as the only bidder. The USOC initially picked Boston as the US candidate but later withdrew their bid in favor of Los Angeles.)
XXXIII & XXXIV	2024 & 2028	Budapest	Hungary	Withdrew during the candidature stage	13 September 2017	131st in Lima, Peru	(Note: Los Angeles' bid was withdrawn on July 31, 2017 as a prerequisite to being awarded 2028, leaving Paris as the only bidder. The USOC initially picked Boston as the US candidate but later withdrew their bid in favor of Los Angeles.)
XXXIII & XXXIV	2024 & 2028	Hamburg	Germany	Withdrew during the candidature stage	13 September 2017	131st in Lima, Peru	(Note: Los Angeles' bid was withdrawn on July 31, 2017 as a prerequisite to being awarded 2028, leaving Paris as the only bidder. The USOC initially picked Boston as the US candidate but later withdrew their bid in favor of Los Angeles.)
XXXIII & XXXIV	2024 & 2028	Rome	Italy	Withdrew during the candidature stage	13 September 2017	131st in Lima, Peru	(Note: Los Angeles' bid was withdrawn on July 31, 2017 as a prerequisite to being awarded 2028, leaving Paris as the only bidder. The USOC initially picked Boston as the US candidate but later withdrew their bid in favor of Los Angeles.)

=== Third system era ===
Games	Year	Bid party (Preferred host/Confirmed bids)		Result	Final selection process		Note
Games	Year	City	NOCs	Result	Date	IOC Session	Note
XXXV	2032	Brisbane	Australia	Awarded to host the Games of the XXXV Olympiad (72 votes)	21 July 2021	138th in Tokyo, Japan	
XXXV	2032	Ahmedabad	India	Did not advance to targeted dialogue phase	21 July 2021	138th in Tokyo, Japan	
XXXV	2032	Doha	Qatar	Did not advance to targeted dialogue phase	21 July 2021	138th in Tokyo, Japan	
XXXV	2032	Jakarta	Indonesia	Did not advance to targeted dialogue phase	21 July 2021	138th in Tokyo, Japan	
XXXV	2032	Madrid	Spain	Did not advance to targeted dialogue phase	21 July 2021	138th in Tokyo, Japan	
XXXV	2032	Rhine-Ruhr	Germany	Did not advance to targeted dialogue phase	21 July 2021	138th in Tokyo, Japan	
XXXVI	2036						
XXXVI	2036	Ahmedabad	India		2029		
XXXVI	2036	Budapest	Hungary		2029		
XXXVI	2036	Doha	Qatar		2029		
XXXVI	2036	Durban	South Africa		2029		
XXXVI	2036	Istanbul	Turkey		2029		
XXXVI	2036	Munich	Germany		2029		
XXXVI	2036	Seoul and North Jeolla Province	South Korea		2029		

== Olympic Winter Games ==
=== First system era ===
Games	Year	Bid party		Result	Final selection process		Note
Games	Year	City	NOCs	Result	Date	IOC Session	Note
I	1924	Chamonix	France	Awarded to host the I Olympic Winter Games (sole bid)	2 June 1921	19th in Lausanne, Switzerland	(Note: Chamonix was chosen by the IOC to stage the "International Sports Week 1924", which would later be considered the First Olympic Winter Games.)
II	1928	St. Moritz	Switzerland	Awarded to host the II Olympic Winter Games	5 June 1926	24th in Lisbon, Portugal	
II	1928	Davos	Switzerland	Not selected to host the games	5 June 1926	24th in Lisbon, Portugal	
II	1928	Engelberg	Switzerland	Not selected to host the games	5 June 1926	24th in Lisbon, Portugal	
III	1932	Lake Placid	United States	Awarded to host the III Olympic Winter Games	10 April 1929	27th in Lausanne, Switzerland	(Note: Until the 1938 revision of the Olympic Charter, the IOC rules stated that the host country of the Summer Olympics took priority if it wished to also host the Winter Olympics the same year.)
III	1932	Bear Mountain	United States	Not selected to host the Games	10 April 1929	27th in Lausanne, Switzerland	(Note: Until the 1938 revision of the Olympic Charter, the IOC rules stated that the host country of the Summer Olympics took priority if it wished to also host the Winter Olympics the same year.)
III	1932	Denver	United States	Not selected to host the Games	10 April 1929	27th in Lausanne, Switzerland	(Note: Until the 1938 revision of the Olympic Charter, the IOC rules stated that the host country of the Summer Olympics took priority if it wished to also host the Winter Olympics the same year.)
III	1932	Duluth	United States	Not selected to host the Games	10 April 1929	27th in Lausanne, Switzerland	(Note: Until the 1938 revision of the Olympic Charter, the IOC rules stated that the host country of the Summer Olympics took priority if it wished to also host the Winter Olympics the same year.)
III	1932	Minneapolis	United States	Not selected to host the Games	10 April 1929	27th in Lausanne, Switzerland	(Note: Until the 1938 revision of the Olympic Charter, the IOC rules stated that the host country of the Summer Olympics took priority if it wished to also host the Winter Olympics the same year.)
III	1932	Montreal	Canada	Not selected to host the Games	10 April 1929	27th in Lausanne, Switzerland	(Note: Until the 1938 revision of the Olympic Charter, the IOC rules stated that the host country of the Summer Olympics took priority if it wished to also host the Winter Olympics the same year.)
III	1932	Oslo	Norway	Not selected to host the Games	10 April 1929	27th in Lausanne, Switzerland	(Note: Until the 1938 revision of the Olympic Charter, the IOC rules stated that the host country of the Summer Olympics took priority if it wished to also host the Winter Olympics the same year.)
III	1932	Yosemite Valley	United States	Not selected to host the Games	10 April 1929	27th in Lausanne, Switzerland	(Note: Until the 1938 revision of the Olympic Charter, the IOC rules stated that the host country of the Summer Olympics took priority if it wished to also host the Winter Olympics the same year.)
IV	1936	Garmisch-Partenkirchen	Germany	Awarded to host the IV Olympic Winter Games	7 June 1933	31st in Vienna, Austria	
IV	1936	Montreal	Canada	Not selected to host the Games	7 June 1933	31st in Vienna, Austria	
IV	1936	St. Moritz	Switzerland	Not selected to host the Games	7 June 1933	31st in Vienna, Austria	
V	~~1940~~	~~Sapporo~~	~~Japan~~	Awarded to host the V Olympic Winter Games (sole bid; relinquished)	9 June 1937	36th in Warsaw, Poland	
V	~~1940~~	~~St. Moritz~~	~~Switzerland~~	Secondly awarded to host the V Olympic Winter Games (withdrew)	9 June 1937	36th in Warsaw, Poland	
V	~~1940~~	~~Garmisch-Partenkirchen~~	~~Germany~~	Thirdly awarded to host the V Olympic Winter Games (cancelled)	9 June 1937	36th in Warsaw, Poland	
V	~~1944~~	~~Cortina d'Ampezzo~~	~~Italy~~	Awarded to host the V Olympic Winter Games (16 votes; cancelled)	9 June 1939	38th in London	
V	~~1944~~	Montreal	Canada	Eliminated in the first voting (12 votes)	9 June 1939	38th in London	
V	~~1944~~	Oslo	Norway	Eliminated in the first voting (2 votes)	9 June 1939	38th in London	
V	1948	St. Moritz	Switzerland	Awarded to host the V Olympic Winter Games	September 1946	39th in Lausanne, Switzerland	
V	1948	Lake Placid	United States	Not selected to host the Games	September 1946	39th in Lausanne, Switzerland	
VI	1952	Oslo	Norway	Awarded to host the VI Olympic Winter Games (17 votes)	21 June 1947	40th in Stockholm, Sweden	
VI	1952	Cortina d'Ampezzo	Italy	Eliminated in the first voting (9 votes)	21 June 1947	40th in Stockholm, Sweden	
VI	1952	Lake Placid	United States	Eliminated in the first voting (1 vote)	21 June 1947	40th in Stockholm, Sweden	
VII	1956	Cortina d'Ampezzo	Italy	Awarded to host the VII Olympic Winter Games (31 votes)	28 April 1949	43rd in Rome, Italy	
VII	1956	Montreal	Canada	Eliminated in the first voting (7 votes)	28 April 1949	43rd in Rome, Italy	
VII	1956	Colorado Springs	United States	Eliminated in the first voting (2 votes)	28 April 1949	43rd in Rome, Italy	
VII	1956	Lake Placid	United States	Eliminated in the first voting (1 vote)	28 April 1949	43rd in Rome, Italy	
VIII	1960	Squaw Valley	United States	Awarded to host the VIII Olympic Winter Games (32 votes)	16 June 1955	50th in Paris, France	
VIII	1960	Innsbruck	Austria	Eliminated in the second voting (30 votes)	16 June 1955	50th in Paris, France	
VIII	1960	Garmisch-Partenkirchen	Germany	Eliminated in the first voting (5 votes)	16 June 1955	50th in Paris, France	
VIII	1960	St. Moritz	Switzerland	Eliminated in the first voting (3 votes)	16 June 1955	50th in Paris, France	
IX	1964	Innsbruck	Austria	Awarded to host the IX Olympic Winter Games (48 votes)	28 April 1959	55th in Munich, Germany	
IX	1964	Calgary	Canada	Eliminated in the first voting (12 votes)	28 April 1959	55th in Munich, Germany	
IX	1964	Lahti	Finland	Eliminated in the first voting (1 vote)	28 April 1959	55th in Munich, Germany	
X	1968	Grenoble	France	Awarded to host the X Olympic Winter Games (32 votes)	28 January 1964	61st in Vienna, Austria	
X	1968	Calgary	Canada	Eliminated in the third voting (24 votes)	28 January 1964	61st in Vienna, Austria	
X	1968	Lahti	Finland	Eliminated in the second voting (14 votes)	28 January 1964	61st in Vienna, Austria	
X	1968	Sapporo	Japan	Eliminated in the first voting (6 votes)	28 January 1964	61st in Vienna, Austria	
X	1968	Oslo	Norway	Eliminated in the first voting (4 votes)	28 January 1964	61st in Vienna, Austria	
X	1968	Lake Placid	United States	Eliminated in the first voting (3 votes)	28 January 1964	61st in Vienna, Austria	
XI	1972	Sapporo	Japan	Awarded to host the XI Olympic Winter Games (32 votes)	26 April 1966	64th in Rome, Italy	
XI	1972	Banff	Canada	Eliminated in the first voting (16 votes)	26 April 1966	64th in Rome, Italy	
XI	1972	Lahti	Finland	Eliminated in the first voting (7 votes)	26 April 1966	64th in Rome, Italy	
XI	1972	Salt Lake City	United States	Eliminated in the first voting (7 votes)	26 April 1966	64th in Rome, Italy	
XII	1976	~~Denver~~	~~United States~~	Awarded to host the XII Olympic Winter Games (39 votes; withdrew)	12 May 1970	69th in Amsterdam, Netherlands	(Note: The selection process for the 1976 Winter Olympics consisted of four bids, and saw Denver, United States, selected ahead of Sion, Switzerland; Tampere, Finland; and Vancouver, Canada. The selection was made at the 70th IOC Session in Amsterdam on 12 May 1970. In a statewide referendum on 7 November 1972, Colorado voters rejected funding for the games, and for the only time a city awarded the Games rejected them. Denver officially withdrew on 15 November, and the IOC then offered the games to Whistler, Canada, but they too declined owing to a change of government following elections. Whistler would go on to be associated with neighbouring Vancouver's successful bid for the 2010 games. Salt Lake City offered to host the games, but the IOC, still reeling from the Denver rejection, declined and selected Innsbruck to host the 1976 Winter Olympics, which had hosted the 1964 Winter Olympics games twelve years earlier, on 5 February 1973. Salt Lake City would then host the Winter Olympics in 2002.)
XII	1976	Innsbruck	Austria	Secondly awarded to host the XII Olympic Winter Games	12 May 1970	69th in Amsterdam, Netherlands	
XII	1976	Sion	Switzerland	Eliminated in the third voting (30 votes)	12 May 1970	69th in Amsterdam, Netherlands	
XII	1976	Tampere	Finland	Eliminated in the second voting (8 votes)	12 May 1970	69th in Amsterdam, Netherlands	
XII	1976	Vancouver and Garibaldi	Canada	Eliminated in the first voting (9 votes)	12 May 1970	69th in Amsterdam, Netherlands	
XIII	1980	Lake Placid	United States	Awarded to host the XIII Olympic Winter Games (sole bid)	23 October 1974	75th in Vienna, Austria	
XIII	1980	Vancouver and Garibaldi	Canada	Withdrew during the host selection process	23 October 1974	75th in Vienna, Austria	
XIV	1984	Sarajevo	Yugoslavia	Awarded to host the XIV Olympic Winter Games (39 votes)	18 May 1978	80th in Athens, Greece	
XIV	1984	Sapporo	Japan	Eliminated in the second voting (36 votes)	18 May 1978	80th in Athens, Greece	
XIV	1984	Gothenburg	Sweden	Eliminated in the first voting (10 votes)	18 May 1978	80th in Athens, Greece	
XV	1988	Calgary	Canada	Awarded to host the XV Olympic Winter Games (48 votes)	30 September 1981	84th in Baden-Baden, Germany	
XV	1988	Falun	Sweden	Eliminated in the second voting (31 votes)	30 September 1981	84th in Baden-Baden, Germany	
XV	1988	Cortina d'Ampezzo	Italy	Eliminated in the first voting (18 votes)	30 September 1981	84th in Baden-Baden, Germany	
XVI	1992	Albertville	France	Awarded to host the XVI Olympic Winter Games (51 votes)	17 October 1986	91st in Lausanne, Switzerland	
XVI	1992	Sofia	Bulgaria	Eliminated in the fifth voting (25 votes)	17 October 1986	91st in Lausanne, Switzerland	
XVI	1992	Falun	Sweden	Eliminated in the fifth voting (9 votes)	17 October 1986	91st in Lausanne, Switzerland	
XVI	1992	Lillehammer	Norway	Eliminated in the run-off voting (40 votes)	17 October 1986	91st in Lausanne, Switzerland	
XVI	1992	Cortina d'Ampezzo	Italy	Eliminated in the third voting (7 votes)	17 October 1986	91st in Lausanne, Switzerland	
XVI	1992	Anchorage	United States	Eliminated in the second voting (5 votes)	17 October 1986	91st in Lausanne, Switzerland	
XVI	1992	Berchtesgaden	Germany	Eliminated in the first voting (6 votes)	17 October 1986	91st in Lausanne, Switzerland	
XVII	1994	Lillehammer	Norway	Awarded to host the XVII Olympic Winter Games (45 votes)	15 September 1988	94th in Seoul, South Korea	
XVII	1994	Östersund	Sweden	Eliminated in the third voting (39 votes)	15 September 1988	94th in Seoul, South Korea	
XVII	1994	Anchorage	United States	Eliminated in the second voting (22 votes)	15 September 1988	94th in Seoul, South Korea	
XVII	1994	Sofia	Bulgaria	Eliminated in the first voting (17 votes)	15 September 1988	94th in Seoul, South Korea	
XVIII	1998	Nagano	Japan	Awarded to host the XVIII Olympic Winter Games (46 votes)	15 June 1991	97th in Birmingham, United Kingdom	
XVIII	1998	Salt Lake City	United States	Eliminated in the fourth voting (42 votes)	15 June 1991	97th in Birmingham, United Kingdom	
XVIII	1998	Östersund	Sweden	Eliminated in the third voting (23 votes)	15 June 1991	97th in Birmingham, United Kingdom	
XVIII	1998	Jaca	Spain	Eliminated in the second voting (5 votes)	15 June 1991	97th in Birmingham, United Kingdom	
XVIII	1998	Aosta	Italy	Eliminated in the run-off voting (29 votes)	15 June 1991	97th in Birmingham, United Kingdom	

=== Second system era ===
Games	Year	Bid party (Candidate/Applicant city)		Result	Final selection process		Note
Games	Year	City	NOCs	Result	Date	IOC Session	Note
XIX	2002	Salt Lake City	United States	Awarded to host the XIX Olympic Winter Games (54 votes)	16 June 1995	104th in Budapest, Hungary	
XIX	2002	Östersund	Sweden	Eliminated in the first voting (14 votes)	16 June 1995	104th in Budapest, Hungary	
XIX	2002	Sion	Switzerland	Eliminated in the first voting (14 votes)	16 June 1995	104th in Budapest, Hungary	
XIX	2002	Quebec City	Canada	Eliminated in the first voting (7 votes)	16 June 1995	104th in Budapest, Hungary	
XIX	2002	Graz	Austria	Not shortlisted to the candidature stage	16 June 1995	104th in Budapest, Hungary	
XIX	2002	Jaca	Spain	Not shortlisted to the candidature stage	16 June 1995	104th in Budapest, Hungary	
XIX	2002	Poprad	Slovakia	Not shortlisted to the candidature stage	16 June 1995	104th in Budapest, Hungary	
XIX	2002	Sochi	Russia	Not shortlisted to the candidature stage	16 June 1995	104th in Budapest, Hungary	
XIX	2002	Tarvisio	Italy	Not shortlisted to the candidature stage	16 June 1995	104th in Budapest, Hungary	
XX	2006	Turin	Italy	Awarded to host the XX Olympic Winter Games (53 votes)	16 June 1999	109th in Seoul, South Korea	
XX	2006	Sion	Switzerland	Eliminated in the first voting (36 votes)	16 June 1999	109th in Seoul, South Korea	
XX	2006	Helsinki	Finland	Not shortlisted to the candidature stage	16 June 1999	109th in Seoul, South Korea	
XX	2006	Klagenfurt	Austria	Not shortlisted to the candidature stage	16 June 1999	109th in Seoul, South Korea	
XX	2006	Poprad	Slovakia	Not shortlisted to the candidature stage	16 June 1999	109th in Seoul, South Korea	
XX	2006	Zakopane	Poland	Not shortlisted to the candidature stage	16 June 1999	109th in Seoul, South Korea	
XXI	2010	Vancouver	Canada	Awarded to host the XXI Olympic Winter Games (56 votes)	2 July 2003	115th in Prague, Czech Republic	
XXI	2010	Pyeongchang	South Korea	Eliminated in the second voting (53 votes)	2 July 2003	115th in Prague, Czech Republic	
XXI	2010	Salzburg	Austria	Eliminated in the first voting (16 votes)	2 July 2003	115th in Prague, Czech Republic	
XXI	2010	Bern	Switzerland	Withdrew during the candidature stage	2 July 2003	115th in Prague, Czech Republic	
XXI	2010	Andorra la Vella	Andorra	Not shortlisted to the candidature stage	2 July 2003	115th in Prague, Czech Republic	
XXI	2010	Harbin	China	Not shortlisted to the candidature stage	2 July 2003	115th in Prague, Czech Republic	
XXI	2010	Jaca	Spain	Not shortlisted to the candidature stage	2 July 2003	115th in Prague, Czech Republic	
XXI	2010	Sarajevo	Bosnia and Herzegovina	Not shortlisted to the candidature stage	2 July 2003	115th in Prague, Czech Republic	
XXII	2014	Sochi	Russia	Awarded to host the XXII Olympic Winter Games (51 votes)	4 July 2007	119th in Guatemala City, Guatemala	
XXII	2014	Pyeongchang	South Korea	Eliminated in the second voting (47 votes)	4 July 2007	119th in Guatemala City, Guatemala	
XXII	2014	Salzburg	Austria	Eliminated in the first voting (25 votes)	4 July 2007	119th in Guatemala City, Guatemala	
XXII	2014	Almaty	Kazakhstan	Not shortlisted to the candidature stage	4 July 2007	119th in Guatemala City, Guatemala	
XXII	2014	Borjomi	Georgia	Not shortlisted to the candidature stage	4 July 2007	119th in Guatemala City, Guatemala	
XXII	2014	Jaca	Spain	Not shortlisted to the candidature stage	4 July 2007	119th in Guatemala City, Guatemala	
XXII	2014	Sofia	Bulgaria	Not shortlisted to the candidature stage	4 July 2007	119th in Guatemala City, Guatemala	
XXIII	2018	Pyeongchang	South Korea	Awarded to host the XXIII Olympic Winter Games (63 votes)	6 July 2011	123rd in Durban, South Africa	
XXIII	2018	Munich	Germany	Eliminated in the first voting (25 votes)	6 July 2011	123rd in Durban, South Africa	
XXIII	2018	Annecy	France	Eliminated in the first voting (7 votes)	6 July 2011	123rd in Durban, South Africa	
XXIV	2022	Beijing	China	Awarded to host the XXIV Olympic Winter Games (44 votes)	31 July 2015	128th in Kuala Lumpur, Malaysia	
XXIV	2022	Almaty	Kazakhstan	Eliminated in the first voting (40 votes)	31 July 2015	128th in Kuala Lumpur, Malaysia	
XXIV	2022	Oslo	Norway	Withdrew during the candidature stage	31 July 2015	128th in Kuala Lumpur, Malaysia	
XXIV	2022	Kraków	Poland	Not shortlisted to the candidature stage	31 July 2015	128th in Kuala Lumpur, Malaysia	
XXIV	2022	Lviv	Ukraine	Not shortlisted to the candidature stage	31 July 2015	128th in Kuala Lumpur, Malaysia	
XXIV	2022	Stockholm	Sweden	Not shortlisted to the candidature stage	31 July 2015	128th in Kuala Lumpur, Malaysia	
XXV	2026	Milan and Cortina d'Ampezzo	Italy	Awarded to host the XXV Olympic Winter Games (47 votes)	24 June 2019	134th in Lausanne, Switzerland	
XXV	2026	Stockholm and Åre	Sweden	Eliminated in the first voting (34 votes)	24 June 2019	134th in Lausanne, Switzerland	
XXV	2026	Calgary	Canada	Withdrew during the candidature stage	24 June 2019	134th in Lausanne, Switzerland	
XXV	2026	Graz	Austria	Withdrew during the candidature stage	24 June 2019	134th in Lausanne, Switzerland	
XXV	2026	Sapporo	Japan	Withdrew during the candidature stage	24 June 2019	134th in Lausanne, Switzerland	
XXV	2026	Sion	Switzerland	Withdrew during the candidature stage	24 June 2019	134th in Lausanne, Switzerland	
XXV	2026	Erzurum	Turkey	Not shortlisted to the candidature stage	24 June 2019	134th in Lausanne, Switzerland	

=== Third system era ===
Games	Year	Bid party (Preferred host/Confirmed bids)		Result	Final selection process		Note
Games	Year	City	NOCs	Result	Date	IOC Session	Note
XXVI & XXVII	2030 & 2034	French Alps	France	Awarded to host the XXVI Olympic Winter Games (84 votes)	24 July 2024	142nd in Paris, France	
XXVI & XXVII	2030 & 2034	Utah	United States	Awarded to host the XXVII Olympic Winter Games (83 votes)	24 July 2024	142nd in Paris, France	
XXVI & XXVII	2030 & 2034	Switzerland	Switzerland	Did not advance to targeted dialogue phase	24 July 2024	142nd in Paris, France	
XXVI & XXVII	2030 & 2034	Stockholm and Åre	Sweden	Did not advance to targeted dialogue phase	24 July 2024	142nd in Paris, France	
XXVI & XXVII	2030 & 2034	Barcelona, Zaragoza and Pyrenees	Spain	Withdrew during the candidature stage	24 July 2024	142nd in Paris, France	
XXVI & XXVII	2030 & 2034	Vancouver	Canada	Withdrew during the candidature stage	24 July 2024	142nd in Paris, France	
XXVI & XXVII	2030 & 2034	Sapporo	Japan	Withdrew during the candidature stage	24 July 2024	142nd in Paris, France	
XXVIII	2038	Switzerland	Switzerland	In privileged dialogue to potentially host the XXVIII Olympic Winter Games			

== Bidding cities ==
City	Country	Games of the Olympiad	Olympic Winter Games	Total
Andorra la Vella	Andorra		1 (2010)	1 (0)
Buenos Aires	Argentina	4 (1936, 1956, 1968, 2004)		4 (0)
Brisbane	Australia	2 (1992, 2032)		2 (1)
Melbourne	Australia	2 (1956, 1996)		2 (1)
Sydney	Australia	1 (2000)		1 (1)
Graz	Austria		2 (2002, 2026)	2 (0)
Innsbruck	Austria		3 (1960, 1964, 1976)	3 (2)
Klagenfurt	Austria		1 (2006)	1 (0)
Salzburg	Austria		2 (2010, 2014)	2 (0)
Vienna	Austria	1 (1964)		1 (0)
Baku	Azerbaijan	2 (2016, 2020)		2 (0)
Antwerp	Belgium	1 (1920)		1 (1)
Brussels	Belgium	3 (~~1916~~, 1960, 1964)		3 (0)
Sarajevo	Yugoslavia; Bosnia and Herzegovina		2 (1984, 2010)	2 (1)
Brasília	Brazil	1 (2000)		1 (0)
Rio de Janeiro	Brazil	4 (1936, 2004, 2012, 2016)		4 (1)
Sofia	Bulgaria		3 (1992, 1994, 2014)	3 (0)
Banff	Canada		1 (1972)	1 (0)
Calgary	Canada		5 (1964, 1968, 1988, 2026)	5 (1)
Garibaldi	Canada		2 (1976, 1980)	2 (0)
Montreal	Canada	4 (~~1944~~, 1956, 1972, 1976)	4 (1932, 1936, ~~1944~~, 1956)	8 (1)
Quebec City	Canada		1 (2002)	1 (0)
Toronto	Canada	2 (1996, 2008)		2 (0)
Vancouver	Canada		4 (1976, 1980, 2010, 2030)	4 (1)
Beijing	China	2 (2000, 2008)	1 (2022)	3 (2)
Harbin	China		1 (2010)	1 (0)
Havana	Cuba	3 (1920, 2008, 2012)		3 (0)
Prague	Czech Republic	2 (1924, 2016)		2 (0)
Alexandria	Egypt	2 (~~1916~~, 1936)		2 (0)
Cairo	Egypt	1 (2008)		1 (0)
Helsinki	Finland	5 (1936, ~~1940~~, ~~1944~~, 1952)	1 (2006)	5 (1)
Lahti	Finland		3 (1964, 1968, 1972)	3 (0)
Tampere	Finland		1 (1976)	1 (0)
Albertville	France		1 (1992)	1 (1)
Annecy	France		1 (2018)	1 (0)
Chamonix	France		1 (1924)	1 (1)
French Alps	France		1 (2030)	1 (1)
Grenoble	France		1 (1968)	1 (1)
Lille	France	1 (2004)		1 (0)
Lyon	France	2 (1920, 1968)		2 (0)
Paris	France	6 (1900, 1924, 1992, 2008, 2012, 2024)		6 (3)
Borjomi	Georgia		1 (2014)	1 (0)
Berchtesgaden	Germany		1 (1992)	1 (0)
Berlin	Germany	4 (1908, ~~1916~~, 1936, 2000)		4 (1)
Cologne	Germany	1 (1936)		1 (0)
Frankfurt	Germany	1 (1936)		1 (0)
Garmisch-Partenkirchen	Germany		3 (1936, ~~1940~~, 1960)	3 (1)
Hamburg	Germany	1 (2024)		1 (0)
Leipzig	Germany	1 (2012)		1 (0)
Munich	Germany	2 (1972, 2036)	1 (2018)	3 (1)
Nuremberg	Germany	1 (1936)		1 (0)
Rhine-Ruhr	Germany	1 (2032)		1 (0)
Birmingham	Great Britain	1 (1992)		1 (0)
London	Great Britain	4 (1908, ~~1944~~, 1948, 2012)		4 (3)
Manchester	Great Britain	2 (1996, 2000)		2 (0)
Athens	Greece	4 (1896, ~~1944~~, 1996, 2004)		4 (2)
Budapest	Hungary	7 (~~1916~~, 1920, 1936, ~~1944~~, 1960, 2024, 2036)		7 (0)
Ahmedabad	India	2 (2032, 2036)		2 (0)
Jakarta	Indonesia	1 (2032)		1 (0)
Dublin	Ireland	1 (1936)		1 (0)
Aosta	Italy		1 (1998)	1 (0)
Cortina d'Ampezzo	Italy		6 (~~1944~~, 1952, 1956, 1988, 1992, 2026)	6 (2)
Milan	Italy	2 (1908, 2000)	1 (2026)	3 (1)
Rome	Italy	9 (~~1908~~, 1924, 1936, ~~1940~~, ~~1944~~, 1960, 2004, 2020, 2024)		9 (1)
Tarvisio	Italy		1 (2002)	1 (0)
Turin	Italy		1 (2006)	1 (1)
Nagano	Japan		1 (1998)	1 (1)
Nagoya	Japan	1 (1988)		1 (0)
Osaka	Japan	1 (2008)		1 (0)
Sapporo	Japan		6 (~~1940~~, 1968, 1972, 1984, 2026, 2030)	6 (1)
Tokyo	Japan	5 (~~1940~~, 1960, 1964, 2016, 2020)		5 (2)
Almaty	Kazakhstan		2 (2014, 2022)	2 (0)
Kuala Lumpur	Malaysia	1 (2008)		1 (0)
Mexico City	Mexico	3 (1956, 1960, 1968)		3 (1)
Amsterdam	Netherlands	6 (~~1916~~, 1920, 1924, 1928, 1952, 1992)		6 (1)
Lillehammer	Norway		2 (1992, 1994)	2 (1)
Oslo	Norway		5 (1932, ~~1944~~, 1952, 1968, 2022)	5 (1)
Kraków	Poland		1 (2022)	1 (0)
Zakopane	Poland		1 (2006)	1 (0)
San Juan	Puerto Rico	1 (2004)		1 (0)
Doha	Qatar	4 (2016, 2020, 2032, 2036)		4 (0)
Moscow	Russia	3 (1976, 1980, 2012)		3 (1)
Saint Petersburg	Russia	1 (2004)		1 (0)
Sochi	Russia		2 (2010, 2014)	2 (1)
Belgrade	Serbia	2 (1992, 1996)		2 (0)
Poprad	Slovakia		2 (2002, 2006)	2 (0)
Cape Town	South Africa	1 (2004)		1 (0)
Durban	South Africa	1 (2036)		1 (0)
Pyeongchang	South Korea		3 (2010, 2014, 2018)	3 (1)
Seoul	South Korea	1 (1988)		1 (1)
Seoul and North Jeolla Province	South Korea	1 (2036)		1 (0)
Barcelona	Spain	4 (1924, 1936, ~~1940~~, 1992)	1 (2030)	5 (1)
Jaca	Spain		4 (1998, 2002, 2010, 2014)	4 (0)
Madrid	Spain	5 (1972, 2012, 2016, 2020, 2032)		5 (0)
Pyrenees	Spain		1 (2030)	1 (0)
Seville	Spain	2 (2004, 2008)		2 (0)
Zaragoza	Spain		1 (2030)	1 (0)
Åre	Sweden		2 (2026, 2030)	2 (0)
Falun	Sweden		2 (1988, 1992)	2 (0)
Gothenburg	Sweden		1 (1984)	1 (0)
Östersund	Sweden		3 (1994, 1998, 2002)	3 (0)
Stockholm	Sweden	2 (1912, 2004)	3 (2022, 2026, 2030)	5 (1)
Bern	Switzerland		1 (2010)	1 (0)
Davos	Switzerland		1 (1928)	1 (0)
Engelberg	Switzerland		1 (1928)	1 (0)
Lausanne	Switzerland	4 (1936, ~~1944~~, 1948, 1960)		4 (0)
Sion	Switzerland		4 (1976, 2002, 2006, 2026)	4 (0)
Switzerland	Switzerland		2 (2030, 2038)	2 (0)
St. Moritz	Switzerland		5 (1928, 1936, ~~1940~~, 1948, 1960)	5 (2)
Bangkok	Thailand	1 (2008)		1 (0)
Erzurum	Turkey		1 (2026)	1 (0)
Istanbul	Turkey	6 (2000, 2004, 2008, 2012, 2020, 2036)		6 (0)
Lviv	Ukraine		1 (2022)	1 (0)
Anchorage	United States		2 (1992, 1994)	2 (0)
Atlanta	United States	2 (1920, 1996)		2 (1)
Baltimore	United States	1 (1948)		1 (0)
Bear Mountain	United States		1 (1932)	1 (0)
Chicago	United States	4 (~~1904~~, 1952, 1956, 2016)		4 (0)
Cleveland	United States	2 (~~1916~~, 1920)		2 (0)
Colorado Springs	United States		1 (1956)	1 (0)
Denver	United States		2 (1932, ~~1976~~)	2 (0)
Detroit	United States	7 (~~1944~~, 1952, 1956, 1960, 1964, 1968, 1972)		7 (0)
Duluth	United States		1 (1932)	1 (0)
Lake Placid	United States		6 (1932, 1948, 1952, 1956, 1968, 1980)	6 (2)
Los Angeles	United States	10 (1924, 1928, 1932, 1948, 1952, 1956, 1976, 1980, 1984, 2028)		10 (3)
Minneapolis	United States	3 (1948, 1952, 1956)	1 (1932)	4 (0)
New York City	United States	1 (2012)		1 (0)
Philadelphia	United States	4 (1920, 1948, 1952, 1956)		4 (0)
Salt Lake City/Utah	United States		4 (1972, 1998, 2002, 2034)	4 (1)
San Francisco	United States	1 (1956)		1 (0)
Squaw Valley	United States		1 (1960)	1 (1)
St. Louis	United States	1 (1904)		1 (1)
Yosemite Valley	United States		1 (1932)	1 (0)
Montevideo	Uruguay	1 (1936)		1 (0)
Tashkent	Uzbekistan	1 (2000)		1 (0)

== See also ==
- List of bids for the Summer Olympics
- List of bids for the Winter Olympics
