= Sion bid for the 2026 Winter Olympics =

Bids for the 2026 Winter Olympics
Overview
- XXV Olympic Winter Games
- Winner: Milan–Cortina d'Ampezzo; Runner-up: Stockholm–Åre

Details
- City: Sion, Switzerland
- Chair: Frédéric Favre
- NOC: Swiss Olympic Association (COC)

Previous Games hosted
- Never hosted Games but has bid three times previously

Decision
- Result: Withdrew bid

Sion 2026 (German: Sitten 2026; Italian: Seduno 2026) was a proposed bid for the 2026 Winter Olympics by the city of Sion and the Swiss Olympic Association. Sion has never previously hosted the Olympics but bid for the Olympics in 1976, 2002 and 2006. The 2026 bid was withdrawn after a local referendum in which 54% of voters rejected it.

== History ==
At first, five Swiss bids were submitted to the Swiss Olympic Association: 'Sion 2026: Swiss Made Winter Games', 'Graubünden and partners 2026', 'Central Switzerland 2026', '2026 - Games for our future' and 'Switzerland 2026'.

In October 2017, the Swiss government announced its support for the Sion 2026 bid. The next month, a public vote was scheduled for the 10 June the next year. The bid's preliminary feasibility report predicted that bringing the Olympics to Sion would cost CHF1.86bn and produce direct revenue of CHF1.35bn. The canton of Valais pledged CHF60m and the Swiss government promised to give the bid CHF995m. The Games budget was later reported to actually be CHF2.4bn by radio station RTS.

In April 2018, the Swiss Olympic Association confirmed Sion as an 'interested party' in the 2026 Games.

In May 2018 it was announced that the Host City Contract would be signed jointly by the canton of Valais and the city of Sion.

=== Public vote ===
The plebiscite held on 10 June 2018 had 216,548 eligible voters and saw a turnout of 62.6%. 71,579 people (or 53.98% of the vote) rejected the bid and 61,019 (or 46.02% of the vote) accepted it. 1,049 ballots were left blank and 1,912 were invalidated.

Overall, the cities voted more strongly against the bid while the mountain provinces were more accepting. All of the cities in the canton voted to reject the bid with a majority of 55% or more except Visp which had a smaller 'no' vote, at 51%.

Philippe Varone, the mayor of Sion said that there was "no plan B" after the rejection of the bid at the public vote. The Sion 2026 bid was formally ended during the Dialogue Stage of the IOC selection process, leaving six other bids still in the running: Milan, Italy; Graz, Austria; Stockholm, Sweden; Erzurum, Turkey; Sapporo, Japan and Calgary, Canada. Of these, three cancelled their bids in the Dialogue Stage and the Turkish bid was not invited to join the Candidature Stage, leaving the Italian and Swedish bids as the only willing hosts.

== Previous bids ==
The last time Switzerland held an Olympic Games was the 1948 Winter Olympics in St. Moritz. Sion has never previously hosted the Olympics but bid for the Olympics in 1976, 2002 and 2006.

== See also ==
- Switzerland at the Olympics
