= Bids for the 2038 Winter Olympics =

Upcoming multi-sport event

XXVIII Olympic Winter Games

The 2038 Winter Olympics, officially known as XXVIII Olympic Winter Games, is a future international multi-sport event.

In November 2023, the International Olympic Committee (IOC) entered into exclusive discussions with Switzerland to host the Games. In January 2026, the IOC noted that Switzerland could become the preferred bidder by 2027. If this does not take place, the IOC would open up the bidding process to other locations.

== Bidding process ==
The new IOC bidding process was approved at the 134th IOC Session on 24 June 2019 in Lausanne, Switzerland. The key proposals, driven by the relevant recommendations from Olympic Agenda 2020, are:

- Establish a permanent, ongoing dialogue to explore and create interest among cities/regions/countries and National Olympic Committees for any Olympic event
- Create two Future Host Commissions (Summer and Winter Games) to oversee interest in future Olympic events and report to the IOC executive board
- Give the IOC Session more influence by having non-executive board members form part of the Future Host Commissions. The IOC also modified the Olympic Charter to increase its flexibility by removing the date of election from 7 years before the games and changing the host as a city from a single city/region/country to multiple cities, regions, or countries.

The change in the bidding process was criticised by members of the German bid as "incomprehensible" and hard to surpass "in terms of non-transparency".

=== Future host winter commissions ===
The full composition of the Winter Commissions, overseeing interested hosts or with potential hosts where the IOC may want to create interest, is as follows:

Future Host Winter Commissions for 2038 Winter Olympics
IOC members (4)	Other members (4)
(Austria) Karl Stoss (chair); (Slovakia) Danka Hrbeková; (France) Martin Fourcade; (Afghanistan) Samira Asghari	(Estonia) Johanna Talihärm (Athletes); (Latvia) Einars Fogelis (AIOWF); (Australia) Ian Chesterman (NOCs); (Netherlands) Rita van Driel (IPC member)

=== Dialogue stages ===
According to Future Host Commission terms of reference with rules of conduct, the new IOC bidding system is divided into 2 dialogue stages:

- Continuous Dialogue: Non-committal discussions between the IOC and Interested Parties (City/Region/Country/NOC interested in hosting) concerning hosting future Olympic events.
- Targeted Dialogue: Targeted discussions with one or more Interested Parties (called Preferred Host(s)), as instructed by the IOC Executive Board.

=== Confirmed bid ===
City	Country	National Olympic Committee	Status
Bern, Crans-Montana, Engelberg, Geneva, Lausanne, Lenzerheide, Lugano, Celerina, Silvaplana, Zug and Zurich	Switzerland	Swiss Olympic Association (SOA)	Privileged dialogue
In November 2023, the IOC entered "privileged dialogue" with Switzerland for the 2038 Winter Games, thereby exclusively negotiating the hosting rights with Switzerland. In January 2026, the IOC noted that Switzerland could become the preferred bidder by 2027. Switzerland noted they would be the first "national" bid, rather than the Games being held in a specific city or region. On 12 January 2026, ten cantons and 14 municipalities were revealed as proposed sites for hosting the 2038 Winter Olympics. Geneva will host curling and speed skating, Lausanne will host figure skating and short track skating, Crans-Montana will host alpine skiing, Lugano, Zug and Zurich will host ice hockey, Engelberg will host cross-country skiing, Nordic combined and ski jumping, Lenzerheide will host biathlon, St. Moritz-Celerina will host bobsleigh, luge and skeleton and St. Moritz-Silvaplana will host freestyle skiing and snowboard. Lausanne and Bern would host the opening and closing ceremonies, respectively. On 14 January 2026, the Swiss Federal Council announced it would back the bid and would commit up to CHF200 million ($249 million) in funding, which was later approved in October. That same month, they would also vote against holding a national referendum, and instead, would allow each Canton of Switzerland to hold their own referendums on whether they should host events. In February 2026, domestic sportswear brand On committed around CHF20 million ($25.7 million) towards becoming a sponsor of the bid. On 30 April 2026, results of a poll done by gfs.bern were released. 61% voted to support the candidacy; 28% were somewhat in favour. 21% voted against the candidacy; 13% were somewhat likely to oppose it. 4% were undecided.

=== Potential bids ===
City	Country	National Olympic Committee
Canada (host city to be announced)		Canadian Olympic Committee (COC)
In February 2026, the Canadian Olympic Committee noted that they would be willing to bid for the Games if the Switzerland bid "[does] not materialize". On 9 April 2026, the premier of Alberta, Danielle Smith, suggested the possibility of Calgary or Edmonton bidding to host a future Winter Olympics. She said that the cities would be in the position to put a bid forward if they had an integrated rail system, new mountain resorts, and new stadiums and arenas without disclosing the cost of hosting (suggested to be between $5-10 billion) to the public. In addition, she suggested the bobsleigh, luge, skeleton and ski jumping venues in Vancouver that were used in 2010 could host events again. Calgary previously hosted the 1988 Winter Olympics and bid for 2026, but withdrew after a referendum. The Games would eventually be awarded to Milan and Cortina d'Ampezzo.
Lahti	Finland	Finnish Olympic Committee (SOr)
In March 2026, the mayor of Lahti proposed a Finnish bid for the Games, with his city as a main venue.
Norway (host city to be announced)		Norwegian Olympic and Paralympic Committee and Confederation of Sports (NIF)
On 23 February 2026, following the country's best Winter Olympic performance in the 2026 Winter Olympics, Norwegian prime minister Jonas Gahr Støre announced he would back a future Norwegian Winter Olympics bid, either in 2038 (if the Swiss bid does not go ahead) or 2042 (considered the most realistic option). Norway previously hosted the 1952 Winter Olympics in Oslo and the 1994 Winter Olympics in Lillehammer. Oslo also bid for the 2022 Games, but withdrew for a multitude of reasons. The Games would eventually be awarded to Beijing.
New York City and Lake Placid	United States	United States Olympic & Paralympic Committee (USOPC)
In March 2026, New York governor Kathy Hochul backed a potential bid for a future edition of the Winter Games, co-hosted between New York City and Lake Placid. Lake Placid previously hosted the 1932 and 1980 Winter Olympics while New York City previously bid for the 2012 Summer Olympics. On 22 June 2026, Hochul announced the formation of an Exploratory Committee to evaluate the potentiality of a Lake Placid-New York City Winter Olympic and Paralympic bid for 2042.

== Notes ==
Winter Olympics
Preceded by Utah	XXVIII Olympic Winter Games; To be determined 2038	Succeeded by To be determined
