= Salt Lake City Olympics =

Salt Lake City Olympics may refer to:

- 2002 Winter Olympics, XIX Olympic Winter Games
- 2034 Winter Olympics, XXVII Olympic Winter Games
