= Fraser Bullock =

Canadian entrepreneur (born 1955)

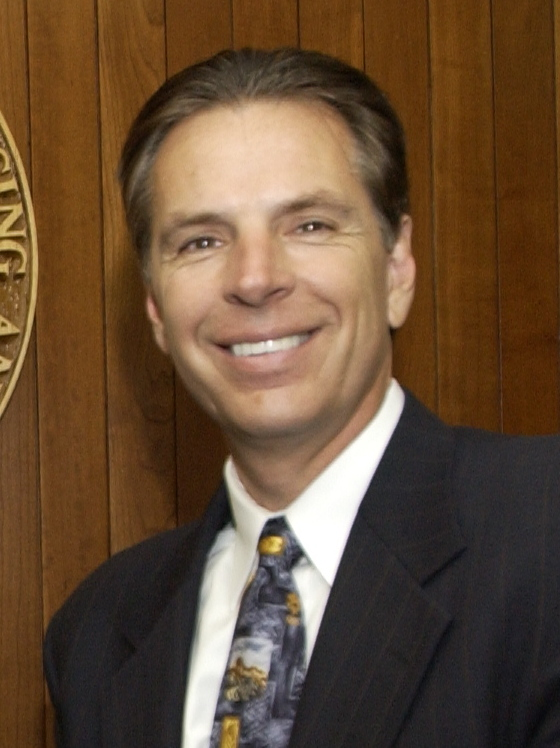
- Bullock in 2002

President of the Utah Organizing Committee for the 2034 Olympic and Paralympic Winter Games
- Incumbent
- Assumed office February 17, 2030
- Preceded by: Edgar Grospiron (French Alps 2030)

Chair of the Utah Organizing Committee for the 2034 Olympic and Paralympic Winter Games
- Incumbent
- Assumed office February 14, 2025
- Leader: Kirsty Coventry
- Preceded by: Position established

Personal details
- Born: 1955 (age 70–71) Taber, Alberta, Canada
- Spouse: Jennifer Bullock
- Parent(s): Evan Bullock, Grace Bullock
- Education: B.A. (1978); MBA (1980)
- Alma mater: Brigham Young University
- Occupation: Partner of Sorenson Capital
- Known for: Former COO/CFO of 2002 Winter Olympics, founding partner of Bain Capital/Sorenson Capital

Fraser Bullock (born 1955) is an American entrepreneur who is a partner of Sorenson Capital and former COO of the Salt Lake Organizing Committee (SLOC) of the 2002 Winter Olympics. He is the current president and executive chair of the organizing committee for the 2034 Winter Olympics. He previously led the bid effort for the games. Prior to joining the SLOC, Bullock had run his own private equity firm.

He graduated from Brigham Young University with a bachelor's degree in 1978 and an MBA in 1980. Since 2002, Bullock has served on the board of directors of the Utah Athletic Foundation, the non-profit that manages the Utah Olympic Park in Park City, Utah, the Utah Olympic Oval in Salt Lake City, and the Soldier Hollow Nordic venue in Midway, Utah.

Bullock was among the founding members of Bain Capital and also worked at Bain & Company.

Bullock has served in multiple positions in the Church of Jesus Christ of Latter-day Saints, including as an area seventy.

During the 2012 U.S. presidential election, he appeared in a Restore Our Future television ad supporting Republican Mitt Romney and touting Romney's experience as head of the 2002 Winter Olympics.

Sporting positions
Preceded by (France) Edgar Grospiron	President of Organizing Committee for Winter Olympic Games; 2034	Succeeded by TBD
