= Calgary bid for the 2026 Winter Olympics =

Bid by city in Alberta, Canada

Bids for the 2026 Winter Olympics
Overview
- XXV Olympic Winter Games
- Winner: Milan–Cortina d'Ampezzo; Runner-up: Stockholm–Åre

Details
- City: Calgary, Alberta
- Chair: Scott Hutcheson
- NOC: Canadian Olympic Committee (COC)

Previous Games hosted
- 1988 Winter Olympics

Decision
- Result: Withdrew bid

Calgary 2026 was an unsuccessful bid for the 2026 Winter Olympics by the city of Calgary, Alberta and the Canadian Olympic Committee. Calgary previously hosted the 1988 Winter Olympics. The bid was withdrawn after a local referendum in which 56.4% of Calgary voters rejected the bid.

== History ==
Calgary hosted the highly successful 1988 Winter Olympics and posed the bid as "a catalyst to renew the legacies of 1988". The Olympics were projected to cost Calgary between CAN$5 - 5.1 billion but funding deals meant Alberta would have paid CAN$700 million and the IOC would have contributed CAN$1.2 billion.

A Calgary Bid Exploration Committee was established and returned a report to Council and the public.

There was speculation that Calgary City Council would cancel the bid before the public vote with reports that the mayor Naheed Nenshi was ready to officially end the bid over funding complications. This proved unfounded after the council voted against cancelling the bid early; eight of the city's 15 councillors voted to kill the proposals, two short of the two-thirds super-majority needed to end the Olympic bid.

Calgarians were given a non-binding vote on the Olympic bid on 13 November 2018. Voters had to be over 18, a resident of Calgary on the vote day and a Canadian citizen and were asked "Are you for or are you against Calgary hosting the 2026 Olympic and Paralympic Games?". The city voted against the proposed plans, with 56.4% opposing and 43.6% supporting the bid and turnout at 40%. Only one of Calgary's 14 wards voted in favour of holding the Games.

After the plebiscite, the City Council unanimously voted to suspend the bid on 19 November 2018, leaving just two joint bids vying for the 2026 games: Stockholm-Åre and Milan–Cortina d'Ampezzo.

=== Plebiscite ===
Choice	Votes	%
For	132,832	43.61
Against	171,750	56.39
Total	304,582	100.00
Valid votes	304,582	99.94
Invalid/blank votes	192	0.06
Total votes	304,774	100.00
Registered voters/turnout	304,774	100.00

== Previous bids ==
Calgary had previously bid for several Olympic Games, often with the help of the Calgary Olympic Development Association. It bid for the 1964 Winter Olympics losing to Innsbruck, Austria and the 1968 Winter Olympics losing to Grenoble, France. The city partnered with Banff for its third bid and looked set to win the 1972 games, but environmental worries about plans for the development of parts of the Banff National Park meant it finished second to Sapporo, Japan.

Calgary won the right to represent the Canadian Olympic Association for the 1988 games, defeating a rival bid from Vancouver. The city was opposed by bids from Falun, Sweden and Cortina d'Ampezzo, Italy. Calgary was confirmed as the host for the 1988 games at the 84th IOC Session in Baden-Baden in 1981.

== Venues ==
80% of the venues for the bid were pre-existing or temporary.

=== Sporting venues ===
In Calgary, pre-existing venues included the Olympic Oval for speed skating, McMahon Stadium for the opening and closing ceremonies, the Saddledome (the home of the Calgary Flames) for ice hockey. Planned venues included a medium-sized arena for ice hockey with a capacity of 5000 (intended to serve as a replacement of the Stampede Corral) and a multi-sport complex for figure and short track speed skating with a capacity of 10,000.

=== Olympic Village ===
The main Olympic Village was proposed to be in Calgary and have a capacity of 2900 with smaller villages in Canmore (capacity of 1050), Nakiska (capacity of 1000) and Whistler (capacity of 350).

=== Non-sporting venues ===
The broadcasting centre would have been in the existing BMO Centre.

== See also ==
- Canada at the Olympics
