= Bids for the 2026 Winter Olympics =

Bids for the 2026 Winter Olympics and Paralympics
Overview
- XXV Olympic Winter Games; XIV Paralympic Winter Games
- Winner: Milan–Cortina d'Ampezzo; Runner-up: Stockholm–Åre

Details
- Committee: IOC
- Election venue: 134th IOC Session; Lausanne, Switzerland

Map of the bidding cities
- Winners Milan and Cortina d'Ampezzo marked in red. Runner-ups Stockholm and Åre marked in blue.

Important dates
- Bid: 29 September 2017
- Shortlist: October 2018
- Decision: 24 June 2019

Decision
- Winner: Milan–Cortina d'Ampezzo (47 votes)
- Runner-up: Stockholm–Åre (34 votes)

A total of seven bids were initially submitted for the 2026 Winter Olympics. One bid was not invited to and four of the bids were subsequently withdrawn after entering the candidature stage, leaving Milan–Cortina d'Ampezzo, Italy and Stockholm–Åre, Sweden as the only two remaining candidate bids. Milan–Cortina d'Ampezzo was elected as the host city at the 134th IOC Session in Lausanne, Switzerland, on 24 June 2019.

== Bidding process ==
The IOC Executive Board met in Lausanne to discuss the 2026 bidding process on 9 June 2017; and a new approach was approved at the Extraordinary IOC Session on 11–12 July 2017. The IOC would take a more proactive role in assisting and supporting cities considering a candidature for the 2026 Olympics, and would customise its approach to the needs of the cities in order for them to develop the best value proposition. These measures were designed to lead to a simplified process for the cities, with reduced costs. The Invitation Phase had been extended to one year, starting 13 September 2017, and the Candidature Phase has been shortened to one year, starting from 2018 to 2019. These measures were enacted due to a lack of interest in bidding for the 2026 Games well into 2017.

=== Dialogue stage ===
- Launch of dialogue stage (29 September 2017)
- Joint briefing through video conference (13 October 2017)
- Signing of candidature cooperation agreement (Before scheduling first IOC expert support visits or interactive working session)
- Customised on-site expert support visits (November 2017 – April 2018)
- On-site interactive working session 1: Presentation and discussion of initial Games concept (25 November – 15 December 2017)
- Observer programme at the 2018 Winter Olympics in PyeongChang, South Korea (9–23 February 2018)
- Deadline for cities to enter the candidature process by joining dialogue stage (31 March 2018)
- On-site interactive working session 2: Presentation of consolidated Games concept after consultation with IOC technical experts (May 2018)
- Official debrief between PyeongChang Organising Committee and Beijing Organising Committee (June 2018)
- Provision of host city contract (July 2018)
- IOC Working Group Report submitted to IOC Executive Board (September 2018)
- IOC Executive Board to recommend to the IOC Session cities to invite to the candidature stage (October 2018)
- IOC Session to invite a number of interested cities to take part in the candidature stage (October 2018)

=== Candidature stage ===
- Deadline for the submission of the Candidature File but without core guarantees by the candidate cities (11 January 2019)
- IOC expert pre-visits (February 2019)
- IOC Evaluation Commission analysis including a visit to each candidate city and requests for submission of any additional information or guarantees (March/April 2019)
  - Stockholm–Åre 2026 (12–16 March 2019)
  - Milan–Cortina 2026 (2–6 April 2019)
- Deadline for the submission of the complete Guarantee File (12 April 2019)
- Final Q&A session with the Evaluation Commission via individual video conference (May 2019)
- Publication of the Evaluation Commission Report on www.olympic.org (May 2019)
- Candidate cities' right of response following publication of the Evaluation Commission Report (June 2019)
- Candidate City Briefing 2026 for IOC Members and International Olympic Winter Sports Federations (June 2019)
- Candidate cities present to IOC Session in Lausanne, followed by election of the Host City 2026 (24 June 2019)
- Individual debriefing with each NOC / candidate city (6–9 months after the election)

=== IOC's 2026 Evaluation Commission ===
In October 2018, the IOC appointed the following members and stakeholder representatives to the Evaluation Commission that will assess the candidate cities for the 2026 Olympic and Paralympic Games.

- (Romania) Octavian Morariu: Chair
- (Norway) Kristin Kloster Aasen: IOC member
- (China) Zhang Hong: IOC member
- (Czech Republic) Roman Kumpošt: Stakeholder representative
- (Germany) Heike Größwang: Stakeholder representative
- (United States) Marianna Davis: Stakeholder representative
- (South Korea) Lee Hee-beom: Stakeholder representative
- (Argentina) José Luis Marco: Stakeholder representative

Milan–Cortina d'Ampezzo was selected as host city of the 2026 Winter Olympics after beating Stockholm–Åre by 13 votes on 24 June 2019 at the 134th IOC Session in Lausanne, Switzerland. The host city was originally due to be selected on 11 September 2019, at the 134th IOC Session in Milan; however, IOC rules required that the election be moved to a different location after Italy submitted a bid for the 2026 Games that included the city.

=== Final selection process ===
The IOC voted to select the host city of the 2026 Winter Olympics on 24 June 2019 at the 134th IOC Session in Lausanne, Switzerland.

2026 Winter Olympics bidding results
| City | Nation | Votes |
|---|---|---|
| Milan–Cortina d'Ampezzo | Italy | 47 |
| Stockholm–Åre | Sweden | 34 |

== Criteria ==
A firm criterion for the Winter Olympics is the availability of alpine ski slopes of certain sizes, which narrows down potential locations significantly, and often necessitates locations in less populated areas. The men's downhill requires at least 800 metres (2,600 ft) altitude difference along a course of around 3 kilometres (1.9 mi) in length.

For the 2026 Winter Olympics the IOC allowed a longer distance between events, so that alpine skiing can be held in a mountain area, and sports such as ice hockey and figure skating can be held in a large city more than 160 kilometres (99 mi) away where such arenas are already available or have greater usage after the games.

A certain spectator capacity is required, which is most often 10,000 but varies according to the particular sport. Furthermore, certain VIP areas are required at every venue.

== Candidate cities ==
On 2 July 2018, the IOC announced that it would contribute US$925 million to the host city in order to help reduce costs.

=== Cities in dialogue stage ===
The following cities participated in the dialogue stage. Four of these (Calgary, Sapporo, Sion, and Stockholm) joined the dialogue stage at its launch on 29 September 2017, and took part in the PyeongChang 2018 Observer Programme. The other cities joined in time for the deadline (31 March 2018) for entering the candidature stage.

- Milan–Cortina d'Ampezzo, Italy
- Stockholm–Åre, Sweden
- ~~Calgary, Canada~~ (withdrew on 19 November 2018 after rejection in referendum)
- ~~Erzurum, Turkey~~ (was not invited to candidature stage on 4 October 2018)
- ~~Sapporo, Japan~~ (withdrew on 13 September 2018)
- ~~Graz, Austria~~ (withdrew on 6 July 2018)
- ~~Sion, Switzerland~~ (withdrew on 10 June 2018 after rejection in referendum)

=== Cities in candidature stage ===
Three of the four cities that still remained in the dialogue stage in October 2018 were invited by the IOC to join the candidature stage; these were Calgary, Stockholm, and the joint Milan–Cortina d'Ampezzo bid. Erzurum was the only city remaining in the dialogue stage that was not invited to advance. Calgary withdrew its bid on 19 November 2018, and Stockholm created a joint bid with Åre on 11 January 2019 to become Stockholm–Åre 2026.

The candidate cities were required to fulfill their governmental requirements by 11 January 2019.

| City | Country | National Olympic Committee | Bid Committee Website | Result |
| Milan and Cortina d'Ampezzo | Italy | Italian National Olympic Committee (CONI) | milanocortina2026.coni.it | Winner |
|---|---|---|---|---|
Main article: Milan–Cortina d'Ampezzo bid for the 2026 Winter Olympics In June 2017, the president of the Italian National Olympic Committee (CONI), Giovanni Malagò, proposed a bid for Milan to host the 2026 Winter Olympics. Malagò considered Milan together with Valtellina as suitable candidates. The plan was for Milan to host the ice sports, while the snow sports would take place in Bormio, Santa Caterina di Valfurva, and Livigno, which are already well-known destinations for Alpine skiing, cross-country skiing, snowboarding, biathlon, etc. On 10 March 2018, the mayor of Turin, Chiara Appendino, confirmed that a bid to host the Games on the 20th anniversary of the 2006 Winter Olympics was being explored. She suggested that the bid would introduce a new, revolutionary model for hosting the Games, with sustainability at the forefront. On 17 March, Appendino sent a letter to CONI officially expressing her support, after having resolved an initial split in support amongst fellow council members. The following week, the municipal council gave approval to start the procedure for establishing a "Torino 2026" association. The not-for-profit entity would have the task of overseeing the analysis and research necessary to evaluate the feasibility of an eventual candidature of Turin to host the Winter Olympics. On 29 March, two days before the deadline for cities to join the dialogue stage, it was confirmed that CONI would bid to host the 2026 Games in Milan and Turin, and that a letter of intent had been sent to the IOC. The bid was complicated by the fact that the 134th IOC Session was scheduled to be held in Milan in 2019. According to IOC rules, if an Italian city proceeded to the candidature stage, the venue for the IOC session would need to be changed to a different country. A decision on which city would lead the potential Italian bid for the 2026 Winter Olympic and Paralympic Games was to be made on either 1 August or 17 September 2018. At a conference on 4 July 2018, Appendino presented the "Turin 2026" project and its candidacy, describing the opportunity of a double candidature with Milan as "a chit-chat of the press I haven't seen yet". On 1 August 2018, CONI confirmed that all bidding cities would bid jointly, using existing facilities, and presented a proposal for a combined bid to be launched by Milan, Turin and Cortina d'Ampezzo. CONI then announced on 18 September that it would present a joint bid with just Milan and Cortina d'Ampezzo, since the city of Turin had chosen to withdraw from the bidding process. The next day, Italian Deputy Prime Minister, Matteo Salvini, confirmed that the Italian government would support a 2026 Winter Olympics bid. Furthermore, CONI were open to accepting an eventual return of Turin to the joint Italian bid. On 1 October 2018, CONI provided final confirmation of the Milan–Cortina d'Ampezzo bid for the 2026 Olympics. Although the bid received the Italian government's endorsement, no financial investment was to be provided by the government. However, the regions of Lombardy and Veneto would aim to finance the 2026 Games with private and public investments. On 5 April 2019, the Italian government made a commitment to provide financial support for the Milan–Cortina d'Ampezzo bid.
| Stockholm and Åre | Sweden | Swedish Olympic Committee (SOC) | stockholm-are2026.com | Runner up |
Main article: Stockholm–Åre bid for the 2026 Winter Olympics Stockholm withdrew its bid for the 2022 Winter Olympics in January 2014, but the president of the Swedish Olympic Committee (SOC) claimed in December 2014 that Sweden could apply again, given that the IOC wants to reduce the cost of the Games for organisers, which was the problem with the 2022 bid. The SOC agreed to conduct a feasibility study on a potential bid for the 2026 Winter Olympics. On 31 January 2017, during the semi-final allocation draw for the 2017 Eurovision Song Contest, it was announced by the president of the Stockholm City Council, Eva-Louise Erlandsson Slorach, that Stockholm would not seek to host the 2026 Winter Games. Despite this, the SOC continued to work on the application and, while there was no official commitment from the political parties, the SOC was committed to convincing the city of Stockholm and other involved municipalities to support the revival of Stockholm's bid to host the Winter Games. The alpine events were planned to be held in Åre, a ski resort that is 520 km (323 mi) away from Stockholm, at least three hours travel time by air and car. On 21 February 2018, Richard Brisius announced that the SOC had entered talks with the Latvian Olympic Committee for potential hosting of the bobsleigh, skeleton and luge events at the Sigulda bobsleigh, luge, and skeleton track, 465 km (289 mi) from Stockholm, a proposal that was supported by the Latvian government. The Stockholm bid encountered problems with popular and political support, namely with the reshuffling of the governing coalition in the Stockholm City Council by the Green Party and the Alliance who expressed joint opposition to hosting the 2026 Games. On 11 January 2019, while submitting the bid book, Stockholm 2026 was renamed "Stockholm–Åre 2026" as a joint bid with Åre. On 9 April, the Swedish government agreed to provide the guarantees necessary for the Stockholm–Åre bid to move forward.

=== Withdrawn from dialogue stage ===
The following cities were seen as potential bids and took part in the dialogue stage, but have withdrawn for various reasons.

| City | Country | National Olympic Committee | Bid Committee Website | Withdrawn Date |
| Calgary | Canada | Canadian Olympic Committee (COC) | calgary2026.ca | 19 November 2018 |
|---|---|---|---|---|
Main article: Calgary bid for the 2026 Winter Olympics Calgary Mayor Naheed Nenshi confirmed on 16 September 2015 that a group of community leaders were working on a bid for the 2026 Winter Olympics. In June 2016, Calgary City Council approved spending of up to $5 million on a 15-month bid exploration phase. It was proposed that Calgary would either build new centres and arenas—for example, the controversial CalgaryNEXT arena, which is a field house, multi-purpose arena, ice hockey arena and football stadium combined, planned for the Downtown/Sunalta neighbourhood—or repurpose the arenas/event stages previously used for the 1988 Winter Olympics. John Furlong, CEO of the 2010 Winter Olympics in Vancouver, helped Calgary by running a group for the Canadian Olympic Committee. On 20 November 2017, Calgary City Council officially voted to approve the additional funding of $2 million to support the bid, provided that the federal and provincial governments also supported the bid before January 2018. To help reduce costs, it was proposed that some alpine/ski-jump events be held in Whistler, B.C, and other events be held in venues located in Edmonton to reduce the number of new buildings and infrastructure that would need to be built in Calgary. On 16 April 2018, the city council voted 9–6 to continue working on the potential bid, despite fears that their support would be withdrawn. The Alberta and Canadian government also said they would financially support the bid, pledging an estimated Can$30 million. On 23 April 2018, the city council overwhelmingly voted yes to holding a plebiscite (or a public vote) on whether or not the citizens supported Calgary's decision to host the Winter Games. It was expected to cost around Can$2 million. On 8 June 2018, Calgary announced Scott Hutcheson, a former alpine skier, to be a chairperson for the Olympic Bid Corporation. On 24 June 2018, the Canadian Olympic Committee announced its approval for the 2026 bid. On 1 August 2018, a date of 13 November 2018 was announced for the plebiscite. The city council would vote on the bid again in September, which could cancel the plebiscite and the bid altogether depending on the outcome. On 11 September 2018, the Calgary 2026 team publicly unveiled its draft host plan at City Hall at a projected cost of Can$5.2 billion, of which Can$3 billion would be split between Government of Canada, Province of Alberta and City of Calgary. Events would be hosted in Calgary, Canmore, Whistler and possibly Edmonton. That same night, the city council voted 12–3 to continue the process and let the voters decide on 13 November 2018. On 29 October 2018, after a period of unsatisfactory financial negotiations between the federal, provincial and municipal levels of government, Calgary City Council was advised to cancel the plebiscite and abandon the 2026 Olympic bid altogether. However, on 30 October 2018, it was announced that a funding deal had been met. After uncertainty about securing the funding, the city council voted 8–7 in favour of the motion to halt the process, but it was not enough to meet the supermajority requirement of 10 votes. In the non-binding referendum on 13 November 2018, the polls indicated that 56 percent of voters were against continuing the Olympic bid. The city council voted to withdraw the Olympic bid on 19 November 2018.
| Erzurum | Turkey | Turkish Olympic Committee (TNOC) | | 4 October 2018 |
Turkish President Recep Tayyip Erdoğan announced the country was considering a bid to host the 2026 Winter Olympics in the eastern provinces of Erzurum, Erzincan and Kars. Although Istanbul had made several attempts to host the Summer Olympics and lost to Sydney for 2000, Beijing for 2008 and Tokyo for 2020, it would be Turkey's first bid for the Winter Games. Erzurum previously hosted the 2011 Winter Universiade and the 2017 European Youth Winter Olympic Festival. On 30 March, just hours ahead of the deadline, it was officially announced that Erzurum was confirmed as a candidate to host the 2026 Games, having received backing from Turkey's president. On 4 October 2018 Erzurum was not selected to advance to the next stage due to lack of adequate transport, telecommunications and airports.
| Sapporo | Japan | Japanese Olympic Committee (JOC) | | 13 September 2018 |
Representatives from Sapporo in Japan, host of the 1972 Winter Games, stated that the city was considering a bid for the 2026 or 2030 Winter Olympics. The city predicted it might cost as much as 456.5 billion yen (US$4.3 billion) to host the Games and, according to a report published on 12 May 2016, they planned to have 90 percent of the facilities within half an hour of the Olympic village. The Alpine skiing course would be in Niseko, the world's second-snowiest resort, while the Olympic village would be next to the Sapporo Dome. The plans were presented to the Japanese Olympic Committee on 8 November 2016, and Sapporo gained approval from the JOC on 15 November 2017. For the sliding events, it was reported that Sapporo could either use the Nagano Bobsleigh-Luge Park (as part of an IOC initiative to use pre-existing venues to keep costs down) or build a dedicated venue in Sapporo. Sapporo Teine, which hosted the bobsleigh events at the 1972 Winter Olympics, was demolished in 1991, while the separate sliding venue, used for luge, was closed shortly after the conclusion of the Games. Sapporo withdrew from the 2026 bid on 13 September 2018, in favour of bidding for the 2030 Games.
| Graz | Austria | Austrian Olympic Committee (ÖOC) | austria2026.at | 6 July 2018 |
After the failed public vote in Innsbruck and Tyrol for hosting the 2026 Winter Olympics, the Styrian cities of Graz and Schladming, which previously hosted the 2017 Special Olympics World Winter Games, were planning on bidding to host the Games as an initiative called "Austria 2026". Predominantly, existing venues would be used. While Graz would host indoor ice events (figure skating, short track, curling), Schladming would be the venue for alpine skiing. Other venues might include Kreischberg (freestyle skiing and snowboard), Bischofshofen and Ramsau am Dachstein (ski jumping, cross country skiing, Nordic combined), and Hochfilzen (biathlon). Austrian cities like Vienna, Linz, Klagenfurt or Kapfenberg could host the ice hockey tournament. The possibility of some events taking place in Germany (speed skating in Inzell and luge, bobsleigh, and skeleton in Schönau am Königssee) is also under consideration. The potential bid was very controversial in Austria, as the mayors of Graz and Schladming started to plan the bid without informing the national government or the state government. Anton Lang, state treasurer of Styria, had already announced that the state has no financial leeway for hosting the Olympics. Heinz Christian Strache, Austria's federal minister for sports, also had doubts: After the public vote against a bid in Innsbruck, he said, before Graz and Schladming bid for the Winter Olympics, they needed to find out if Austria supported the action. On 19 March 2018, the Communist Party of Austria called for a referendum over Graz's 2026 bid. On 6 July 2018, the Austrian Olympic Committee announced that Graz had withdrawn their bid due to lack of support from the Provincial Government.
| Sion | Switzerland | Swiss Olympic Association (SOA) | sion2026.ch | 10 June 2018 |
Main article: Sion bid for the 2026 Winter Olympics The Swiss Olympic Association made a general decision about launching a bid during the Sportparlament on 11 March 2016. Five candidate projects handed their letters of intent to the Association before the deadline of 31 May 2016, and were given until 15 December 2016 to forward their bid files. However, the Central Switzerland project withdrew in July 2016 after Lucerne was awarded the 2021 Winter Universiade, and three others projects merged, resulting in two final candidates: Western Switzerland and Graubünden.The chosen candidate city had to be confirmed by the Association by 7 March 2017. The bid Graubünden and Partners was rejected during a public referendum on 12 February 2017, leaving the Western Switzerland bid as only contendent. Sion was chosen to be the host city against Montreux, after Lausanne and Crans-Montana withdrew. The bid included venues within a square area defined at its corners by the cities of Lausanne, Martigny, Visp and Bern. Sion previously bid to host the Winter Olympics in 1976, 2002 and 2006, but lost out to Denver (Innsbruck), Salt Lake City and Turin respectively. The Canton of Valais held a referendum on 10 June 2018 to decide the fate of the 2026 Winter Games bid, and in February 2018, four months before the vote, the polls indicated that 64 percent of voters were against the bid. On 10 June 2018, voters rejected a proposal to fund the 2026 Winter Games with 53.96% of voters refused to pledge financial support for the games. Sion Mayor Philippe Varone stated that since there was no back up plan, Switzerland officially withdrew from potentially bidding.

== Candidate cities venues list ==
| Event | Milan–Cortina d'Ampezzo, Italy | Stockholm–Åre, Sweden |

== Previously interested in bidding ==
The following cities initially explored the possibility of bidding but decided not to proceed to the dialogue stage.

=== Americas ===
- Quebec City, Quebec, Canada

Quebec City initially expressed interest in bidding. In September 2011, Quebec City mayor Régis Labeaume ruled out bidding for 2022. However, the city may bid for another Winter Games in the future. Then-IOC President Jacques Rogge stated that he believes that the 2026 Winter Olympics would be a realistic option for the city to organise the Games. Quebec has a problem finding a mountain for the downhill event, as the planned location of Le Massif was not approved. In September 2015, during an interview on Radio-Canada, Labeaume ruled out any possibility of Quebec making a bid for 2026. Labeaume also attempted, but failed, to create a joint bid with Calgary, Canada; Vancouver, Canada; or Lake Placid, United States. Calgary's Mayor Naheed Nenshi had confirmed his city, the 1988 host, were pondering a bid, but the talks on a joint effort appear to have collapsed.

- Multiple cities, United States

On 9 February 2018, the United States Olympic Committee (USOC) ruled out a bid for the 2026 Winter Olympics and would instead consider bids for the 2030 Winter Olympics:
- Boston, Massachusetts, United States

Boston was actively considering a bid for the 2026 Winter Games. This campaign was dropped when Boston was named by the USOC as the United States' candidate city for the 2024 Summer Olympics. However, due to significant public opposition, Boston's campaign for the 2024 Summer Games was later dropped and Los Angeles was chosen as the USOC bid city. (Los Angeles was later awarded the 2028 Games as part of a deal to grant Paris the 2024 event.)

- Bozeman, Montana, United States

The Big Sky Committee for the Winter Games was seeking to bring the Olympics to the Bozeman and Big Sky areas of southwest Montana, immediately north of Yellowstone National Park. The committee, however, has not sought the bid since 2014.

- (New York (state)) Lake Placid, New York, United States

Lake Placid, the host of the 1932 Winter Olympics and the 1980 Winter Olympics considered a bid for the 2026 Winter Olympics, but had to drop out when the USOC decided not to launch a bid for the 2026 Games.

- Salt Lake City, Utah, United States

Salt Lake City, the host of the 2002 Winter Olympics, had been considering launching a bid to host the Winter Games for a second time, originally as early as 2022. It was not clear whether Salt Lake City was planning to submit a bid for the 2026 or 2030 Olympics, but it would be dependent on which other cities submitted bids. One obstacle for a bid from Salt Lake City is the fact that Los Angeles will be hosting the 2028 Summer Olympics. The US last hosted back-to-back editions of the Olympics in 1980 (Lake Placid Winter Games) and 1984 (Los Angeles Summer Games). LA 2028 President, Casey Wasserman, stated that an attempt for the United States to host the 2026 Winter Olympics and Paralympics would "require a lot of conversation" with the Californian city before a bid was formally launched. The USOC was expected to discuss possible bids for the 2026 Winter Olympic and Paralympic Games at its board meeting in late October. On 16 October 2017, leaders of Salt Lake City and Utah announced the formation of an official Olympic Exploratory Committee. According to sources, Salt Lake City appeared to be more focused on the 2030 Games and the USOC is monitoring the process to see if the IOC will award both the 2026 and 2030 Winter Games at the 134th IOC Session in Milan, Italy in September 2019, repeating the dual allocation of the 2024 and 2028 Summer Games to Paris and Los Angeles. Later this session has been moved to Lausanne due to surprise Italian bid by just Milan with few other places in the country. On December 14th, 2018, Salt Lake City was selected by the United States Olympic Committee (USOC) for a potential bid to host the Winter Olympics in 2030.

=== Asia ===
- Almaty, Kazakhstan

Almaty was reportedly considering a bid to host the 2026 Winter Games after narrowly losing to Beijing in its bid to host the 2022 Winter Olympics. However, Bauyrzhan Baibek, Mayor of Almaty, denied the rumors of Almaty bidding to host the 2026 Winter Olympics.

=== Europe ===
- Innsbruck, Austria

On 17 February 2016, the "Tiroler Tageszeitung" wrote in an article that IOC president Thomas Bach asked the alpine city for an application for the 2026 Winter Olympics. He said that an event such as this would not only be celebrated, but lived. If applying, the host of the 1964 Winter Olympics, the 1976 Winter Olympics and the 2012 Winter Youth Olympics would reuse many of the sites that were used in past games. In October 2016, the Austrian Olympic Committee (ÖOC) agreed to carry out a feasibility study into whether they should launch a bid. On 6 December 2016, the ÖOC commissioned a working group including renowned companies to conduct a feasibility study with results published on 22 June 2017. The study proposes to use facilities at venues across all of Tyrol: Innsbruck, Igls, Kühtai, St. Anton am Arlberg, Hochfilzen, and Seefeld. The two ice hockey venues were to be determined, as was the possibility of using the existing speed skating rink in Inzell in Germany. 2026 marks the 50th anniversary of Innsbruck's 1976 Winter Olympics. Innsbruck could be the first city to host the Winter Olympics three times. A referendum vote in Innsbruck was set for 15 October 2017 to decide whether to proceed with the bid. In the referendum, the bid was defeated as 53 percent voted against it. This was the third successive defeat of an Olympic bid by a vote after Kraków and Munich 2022 and Hamburg 2024, while Budapest and Rome 2024 withdrew to avoid a referendum.

- Dresden, Germany

The mayor of Altenberg, Thomas Kirsten, brought Dresden up for discussion in November 2013, after the Bavarians rejected a Munich bid for the 2022 Winter Olympics. But the German Olympic Sports Confederation decided not to consider a bid since the lack of alpine skiing resorts would have made it necessary to use Czech venues.

- Aosta, Italy

A public debate is promoted by a citizens' committee in the Italian region of Mont Blanc, in order to promote Aosta as the host of the Winter Olympics in 2026 or later. The idea was to build support among the citizens and promote the Games from the bottom up, to build a consensus supporting the effort. The Aosta Valley region's economy is mainly based on winter sports. Starting from the 1970s the main winter resorts hosted world events: Courmayeur hosted a round of the 1977 Alpine Skiing World Cup, Cervinia a round of the 1978 Alpine Skiing World Cup, La Thuile a round of the 2016 Alpine Skiing World Cup and bobsleigh's FIBT World Championships 1971, Cogne a round of the 1984–85 FIS Cross-Country World Cup and a round of 2006–07 FIS Cross-Country World Cup and Fénis hosted in the 1986 FIL World Luge Natural Track Championships. In 1991, the city made a bid for the 1998 Winter Olympics but lost to Nagano, so a 2026 bid would be the city's second attempt. In 1993 Aosta hosted the first edition of the winter European Youth Olympic Festival and in 2010 it hosted the first edition of the Winet Military World Games. The Aosta bid was cancelled when it was announced that the city of Milan will be the host city of the 134th IOC Session to decide the host city, and IOC regulations state that no bid from a country is allowed when the IOC session is in the same country.

- Norway:

- (Oppland) Lillehammer, Norway

On 6 April 2017, it was announced that Lillehammer was considering a bid for the Winter Olympics in 2026 or 2030. Lillehammer was host of the 1994 Winter Olympics and the 2016 Winter Youth Olympics. A feasibility report was published in March. It could share an Olympic bid with Norwegian cities like Oslo, Bergen, Stavanger and Trondheim, according to Norwegian media. However, no further information was released about the bid as the Norwegian Olympic and Paralympic Committee and Confederation of Sports selected the southern Norwegian county of Telemark. On 8 March 2018, Lillehammer renewed its bid to host the Games.
It was confirmed on 30 March 2018 that Lillehammer had ruled out a bid for the 2026 Games, but were likely to target the 2030 Games instead.

- Telemark, Norway

On 31 October 2017, it was announced at a press conference at the top of Mount Gausta that the southern Norwegian county of Telemark, known as the cradle of modern skiing, wanted to host the 2026 Olympics, with a base in the twin UNESCO World Heritage towns Notodden and Rjukan (with the Gaustatoppen alpine ski area) in the North of Telemark, and further fairly spread venues. They also wished for Telemark skiing to be added to the Games. The Norwegian national sports federation turned this location down on 25 January 2018, without suggesting any other Norwegian site.

- Barcelona, Spain

Barcelona (the host city of the 1992 Summer Olympics) had waged a bid for the 2022 Winter Olympics, but, according to mayor Xavier Trias, was not considered ready yet. Instead, one "must concentrate its efforts and commitment to work to reach the Olympic target by 2026". On 17 June 2015, Barcelona announced it will not be bidding to host the 2026 Olympic Winter Games. Mayor Ada Colau who won the municipal elections on 24 May decided that this is not a priority project for the city. On 24 July, the city council accorded to create a specific commission about the social and economic impact of the bid. On 16 March 2017, Barcelona's City Hall government has taken itself out of the running to host the 2026 Winter Olympics. According to Barcelona's deputy mayor, Jordi Collboni, the decision responded "to the current social and economic circumstances not only in Barcelona but in the whole country". Of note, it would have been the second city to host both the Summer and the Winter Olympics after Beijing.
Government officials in Barcelona, Spain are open to the possibility of hosting the 2026 Olympic Winter Games Mundo Deportivo reported after meetings were held between sports administrators and International Olympic Committee (IOC) Vice President Juan Antonio Samaranch.

- Graubünden, Switzerland

The canton of Graubünden released a concept named Graubünden and Partners including potential venues without referring to a dedicated host city. The map of the project presented on 16 December 2016 announced St. Moritz to be host city. Zürich refused even before to be host city of the bid. Voters in the area rejected the bid by more than 60 percent during a public referendum on 12 February 2017. Graubünden failed public referendums to host the 1980 Winter Olympics and the 2022 Winter Olympics as well.

=== Oceania ===
- Auckland and Queenstown, New Zealand

A "pre-feasibility" report was published in May 2015 stating that a joint Winter Olympics with Australia would be feasible for 2026. Bruce McGechan, in a news release on 26 June 2015, said that the New Zealand Olympic Committee had considered the report but had decided not to ask the New Zealand Government to do a full feasibility study of hosting the 2026 Winter Olympics. Therefore, the Olympic Winter Games NZ 2026 project was shelved.
