= Power District Stadium =

Proposed baseball stadium in Salt Lake City, Utah

- Location in Utah Location in the United States Location in North America
- Interactive map of Power District Stadium
- Location: Salt Lake City, Utah, United States
- Coordinates: 40°46′16.1″N 111°55′40.4″W
- Owner: TBD
- Capacity: TBD

Construction
- Cost: TBD

Power District Stadium is a proposed baseball stadium to be constructed in Salt Lake City, Utah. The stadium has been suggested as the potential site for a new or relocated team in Major League Baseball (MLB). Capacity, ownership, financing and opening are yet to be determined.

== Background ==
In early 2023, Gail Miller, wife of late Utah Jazz and Salt Lake Bees owner Larry H. Miller, formed a consortium, Big League Utah, in an effort to bring an MLB expansion team to Salt Lake City. The site for the stadium is located on the west side of Salt Lake City, a 100-acre parcel known as The Power District. In addition to the stadium, it will include retail, residential, commercial and entertainment venues. On February 15, 2024, renderings of the stadium and the district were unveiled to the public along with the Larry H. Miller Companies pledging $3.5 billion towards the project MLB commissioner Rob Manfred has stated that expansion will not occur until the stadium situations for the Oakland Athletics and Tampa Bay Rays have been resolved.
