= Stockholm–Åre bid for the 2026 Winter Olympics =

Bids for the 2026 Winter Olympics and Paralympics
Overview
- XXV Olympic Winter Games; XIV Paralympic Winter Games
- Winner: Milan-Cortina d'Ampezzo; Runner-up: Stockholm–Åre

Details
- Chair: Richard Brisius
- NOC: Swedish Olympic Committee (SWE)/Latvian Olympic Committee (LAT)

Previous Games hosted
- 1912 Summer Olympics (Stockholm); None (Åre); Bid for 2004 Summer (Stockholm)

Decision
- Result: 34 votes (second place)

Stockholm–Åre 2026 was an unsuccessful bid for the 2026 Winter Olympics by the cities of Stockholm and Åre and the Swedish Olympic Committee.

== History ==
Stockholm withdrew from bidding for 2022, but the Swedish NOC president said in December 2014 that Sweden could apply again, given that the IOC wants to reduce the cost of the Games for organisers, which was the problem with the 2022 bid. The Swedish Olympic Committee agreed to conduct a feasibility study on a potential bid for the 2026 Olympics. By December 2017, Stockholm's bid to host the Winter Games was once again active. Events were proposed to be held in Stockholm, Åre, and Falun, and in Sigulda, Latvia. The proposal to include Sigulda was based on the International Olympic Committee's Agenda 2020 initiative to use existing facilities rather than build new ones, and was supported by the Latvian government. On 11 January 2019 Stockholm submitted its bid book, announcing that it was jointly bidding with Åre to become Stockholm–Åre 2026. On 16 March 2019 a survey found that 55 percent of Swedes backed the Olympic bid – a huge positive shift. On 9 April the Swedish government supported the candidature and made over 200 necessary guarantees and warranties to the IOC.

On 24 June 2019, the International Olympic Committee, at the 134th IOC Session, awarded the 2026 Winter Olympics to Milan and Cortina d'Ampezzo, Italy, by a vote of 47 to 34. If they had won the bid, Stockholm would have been the second city to host both the Summer and Winter Olympics (after Beijing).

=== Previous bids ===
Stockholm hosted the 1912 Summer Olympics but has never hosted the Winter Games. The city made a bid to host the 2004 Games, but was defeated by Athens. Åre has never hosted the Olympics.

== Branding ==
The candidate city logo was unveiled on 27 November 2018 during its presentation at the ANOC General Assembly in Tokyo, Japan. The logo of its candidature is derived from the Swedish folk design style and colors called the “Kurbits” style. The logo was designed by Anna Ahnborg and Happy F&B. The bid book was published and the website was relaunched on 29 January 2019 in keeping with the bid slogan "Made in Sweden" (Swedish: Gjord i Sverige).

== Venues ==
Venues

=== Stockholm cluster ===
- Friends Arena – opening ceremony
- Stockholm Olympic Stadium – snowboarding (and possible freestyle big air and aerials)
- Tele2 Arena – figure skating, short track (temporary rinks)
- Ericsson Globe – main ice hockey venue (renovated)
- Scaniarinken – second ice hockey venue (renovated)
- Hammarby – alpine skiing (parallel, team)
- Gubbängen – curling (in construction)
- Barkarby – olympic village and speed skating (new)
- Hamra – biathlon, cross-country skiing (new)
- Multiple locations – closing ceremony (local celebrations in Åre/Falun/Sigulda, main event at Kungsträdgården, the main park of Stockholm)

=== Åre cluster ===
- Central Åre – alpine skiing, snowboarding/freestyle skiing (cross)
- Duved – snowboarding/freestyle skiing (giant slalom/halfpipe/moguls/slopestyle)

=== Falun cluster ===
- Lugnet – ski jumping, Nordic combined

=== Sigulda (Latvia) cluster ===
- Sigulda – bobsleigh, luge and skeleton

== Official partners ==
- Dohrns
- Ericsson
- Neh
- Permobil
