= Bids for the 1984 Winter Olympics =

Overview
- XIV Olympic Winter Games
- Winner: Sarajevo; Runner-up: Sapporo; Shortlist: Gothenburg

Details
- Committee: IOC
- Election venue: 80th IOC Session, Athens

Map of the bidding cities
- Missing location of the bidding cities

Important dates
- Decision: 18 May 1978

Decision
- Winner: Sarajevo (39 votes)
- Runner-up: Sapporo (36 votes)

The selection process for the 1984 Winter Olympics consisted of three bids, and saw Sarajevo, Yugoslavia (in current-day Bosnia and Herzegovina), be selected ahead of Sapporo, Japan, and Gothenburg, Sweden. The selection was made at the 80th International Olympic Committee (IOC) Session in Athens on 18 May 1978.

== Results ==
IOC voting – May 1978
City	Country	Round 1	Round 2
Sarajevo	Yugoslavia	31	39
Sapporo	Japan	33	36
Gothenburg	Sweden	10	—
