= Bids for the 1936 Winter Olympics =

Overview
- IV Olympic Winter Games
- Winner: Garmisch-Partenkirchen; Shortlist: Montreal · St. Moritz

Details
- Committee: IOC
- Election venue: 31st IOC Session, Vienna

Map of the bidding cities
- Missing location of the bidding cities

Important dates
- Decision: 1933

Decision
- Winner: Garmisch-Partenkirchen
- Runner-up

The selection process for the 1936 Winter Olympics consisted of three bids, and saw Garmisch-Partenkirchen, Germany, be selected ahead of Montreal, Quebec, Canada, and St. Moritz, Switzerland. The selection was made at the 31st IOC Session in Vienna, Austria, on 10 April 1933.
