= 2034 Winter Olympics =

Multi-sport event in Utah, US

XXVII Olympic Winter Games
- Provisional emblem
- Location: Utah, United States
- Opening: February 10, 2034
- Closing: February 26, 2034
- Stadium: Rice–Eccles Stadium

The 2034 Winter Olympics, officially the XXVII Olympic Winter Games, and branded as Utah 2034, (Note: Arapaho: Niico'ooowu' 2034; Gosiute Shoshoni: Tit'-so-pi 2034; Navajo: Sooléí 2034; Shoshoni: Soónkahni 2034) is a future international multi-sport event scheduled to take place in and around Salt Lake City, Utah from February 10 to 26, 2034.

Under the new Olympic bid process, the Future Host Commission of the International Olympic Committee (IOC) nominated Salt Lake City–Utah as its preferred candidate on November 29, 2023, with the 2034 Winter Olympics being formally awarded on July 24, 2024, during the 142nd IOC Session in Paris, France.

The Games will be the fifth Winter Olympic Games and tenth overall to be hosted by the United States, and the second to be hosted in the Salt Lake City area since the 2002 Winter Olympics; the Games will utilize most of the same infrastructure and venues that were used in 2002.

== Bidding process ==
Under the new bidding process established under Olympic Agenda 2020, the IOC's Future Host Commission (FHC) for the Winter Olympic Games engages in ongoing, non-committal "continuous dialogue" with parties that are interested in hosting a future edition. The Commission then recommends preferred candidates to be invited to "targeted dialogue" with the IOC Executive Board to formalize their bid, after which it is presented to the IOC's delegates for final approval.

During the 135th IOC Session in January 2020, FHC chair Octavian Morariu identified that Barcelona—Zaragoza, Salt Lake City (which hosted in 2002) and Sapporo (which hosted in 1972) had entered into continuous dialogue regarding hosting a future Winter Olympics in 2030 or later. Salt Lake City was said to be preferring to host the Games in 2034, so that it would not occur immediately after the 2028 Summer Olympics in Los Angeles.

The United States Olympic & Paralympic Committee (USOPC) stated in 2022 that it was "already in dialogue with the IOC, not yet for a specific year but as part of their evolving process" over the possibility of Salt Lake City hosting a future Winter Olympics; the Committee had named Salt Lake City its preferred candidate for a future U.S. Winter Olympics.

On November 29, 2023, per the recommendation of the Future Host Commission, the IOC Executive Board invited the United States Olympic & Paralympic Committee (USOPC) to targeted dialogue, with Salt Lake City–Utah named the sole preferred candidate for the 2034 Winter Olympics. During the 142nd IOC Session in Paris, France on July 24, 2024, the French Alps and Salt Lake City were elected as host of the 2030 and 2034 Winter Olympics respectively, via referendums to the 95 IOC delegates.

2034 Winter Olympics host city election
Region	NOC name	Yes	No	Abs
Salt Lake City–Utah	United States	83	6	6

The IOC insisted that Utah agree that it may "terminate Olympic host city contracts in cases where the supreme authority of the World Anti-Doping Agency (WADA) in the fight against doping is not fully respected or if the application of the world antidoping code is hindered or undermined." This was intended to undermine the United States Department of Justice's criminal investigation into the allegations that the World Anti-Doping Agency failed to sanction and covered up drug use by Chinese swimmers. The Chinese have accused the western mainstream media, in particular The New York Times, of atrocity propaganda against the Chinese athletes. However, IOC president Thomas Bach has attempted to alleviate concerns that the city could lose its second Olympics if organizers do not fulfill an agreement to play a peacemaker between anti-doping authorities. Bach downplayed the gravity of a termination clause that the IOC inserted into Utah's host contract in July.

== Development and preparations ==
The 2002 Winter Olympics in Salt Lake City had left a strong legacy, with venues constructed for the Games (such as Utah Olympic Park) having continued to host international events and world championships in the years that followed; in the 2013–14 season, Utah hosted 16 winter sports events, contributing $27.3 million to the state economy. A report by the Future Host Commission identified goals by the Salt Lake City bid to "elevate our communities, winter sports, and the Games experience for everyone", and expand upon the legacies that were established by 2002.

=== Budget ===
The Utah organizing committee estimated that the 2034 Winter Olympics would cost approximately $4 billion, which is being sourced entirely via private funding and donations (including the Fraser Bullock-backed charity fund Podium34, and a "significant" donation by the Church of Jesus Christ of Latter-day Saints). In comparison, a record $51 billion was spent by Sochi for the 2014 Winter Olympics twenty years prior. While the French Alps are spending $2.5 billion, 25% of this will be public funding.

=== Venues ===
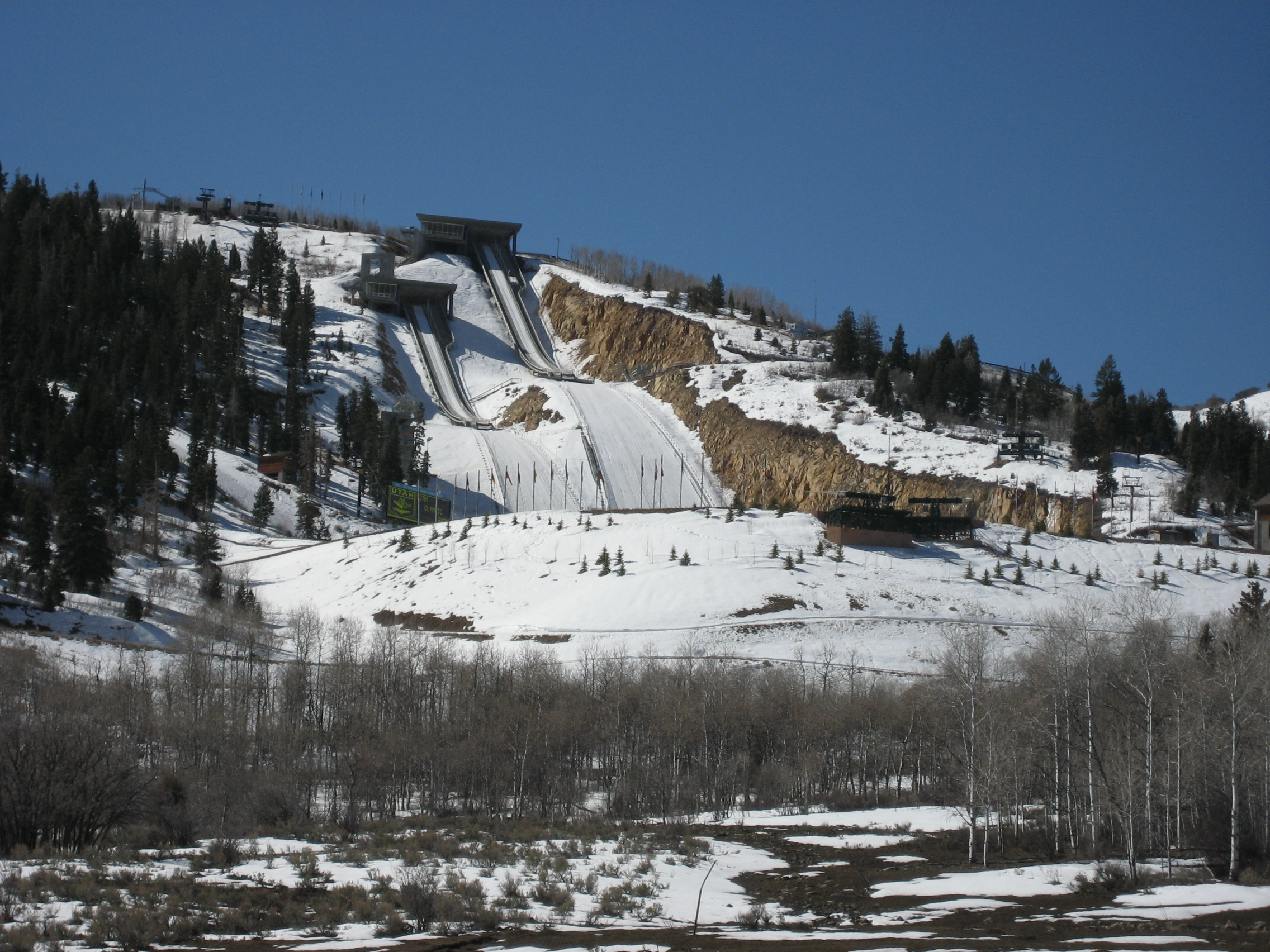
Utah Olympic Park, pictured in 2007, was originally built for the 2002 Games and is scheduled to host several events in 2034.

The Games will utilize nearly all of the facilities originally constructed for the 2002 Winter Olympics, but with some differences:

- Alpine skiing will be hosted only at Snowbasin, instead of being split between Snowbasin, Deer Valley, and Park City.
- Big air events will provisionally take place at a temporary venue constructed in downtown Salt Lake City at the "Block 85" parking lot across from Delta Center (South Temple and 300 West), the same location where the medals plaza was situated in 2002.
- In a reversal from 2002, ice hockey will take place at Delta Center, while Maverik Center will host figure skating and short-track speed skating.
- Curling will be held on a temporary rink at the Salt Palace convention center instead of The Ice Sheet at Ogden; organizers cited an unwillingness by Ogden managers to expand the venue with temporary seating, and a desire to host curling in Salt Lake City proper to capitalize on the sport's growing American popularity.

In early-April 2024, Organizing Committee president Fraser Bullock stated that he would not rule out the possibility that facilities built for new or relocated professional sports teams in Salt Lake City (such as the proposed Power District Stadium, intended for a possible Major League Baseball team) could also be used, noting that the exact venue plans may evolve as the Games draw closer.

As part of the 2024 acquisition of the Arizona Coyotes of the National Hockey League (NHL) by Ryan Smith and their relocation to Salt Lake City, the city earmarked US$900 million to renovate Delta Center and construct a sports and entertainment district around the arena by October 2027, which included a reconstruction of its seating bowl to give its hockey configuration unobstructed views.

In February 2026, the LDS Church stated that it would allow use of church-owned property (such as "Block 85", which will return as the medal plaza and host big air events) as event venues and operational sites.

==== Salt Lake City Zone ====
Venue	Events	Capacity	Status
Downtown Salt Lake City	Snowboarding (big air)	30,000	Temporary
Downtown Salt Lake City	Freestyle skiing (big air)	30,000	Temporary
Downtown Salt Lake City	Medals Plaza	30,000	Temporary
Delta Center	Ice hockey (preliminaries and finals)	16,070	Existing
Maverik Center	Figure skating	10,100	Existing
Maverik Center	Short track speed skating	10,100	Existing
Rice–Eccles Stadium	Ceremonies	51,444	Existing
Salt Palace	Curling	6,500	Existing
Salt Palace	International Broadcast Center	—N/a	Existing
Salt Palace	Main Press Center	—N/a	Existing
University of Utah student housing	Olympic Village	5,000+	Existing, renovated
Utah Olympic Oval	Speed skating	7,500	Existing, renovated

==== Wasatch Back Zone ====
Venue	Events	Capacity	Status
Deer Valley	Freestyle skiing (aerials/moguls)	12,000	Existing
Park City Mountain Resort	Snowboarding (halfpipe/slopestyle)	15,000	Existing
Park City Mountain Resort	Freestyle skiing (halfpipe/slopestyle)	15,000	Existing
Soldier Hollow	Biathlon	15,000	Existing, renovated
Soldier Hollow	Cross-country skiing	15,000	Existing, renovated
Soldier Hollow	Nordic combined	15,000	Existing, renovated
Utah Olympic Park Track	Bobsleigh	12,000	Existing, renovated
Utah Olympic Park Track	Luge	12,000	Existing, renovated
Utah Olympic Park Track	Skeleton	12,000	Existing, renovated
Utah Olympic Park Jumps	Ski jumping	15,000	Existing, renovated
Utah Olympic Park Jumps	Nordic combined	15,000	Existing, renovated

==== Other venues ====
Venue	Location	Events	Capacity	Status
Peaks Ice Arena	Provo	Ice hockey (preliminaries)	10,000	Existing, renovated
Snowbasin Resort	Weber County	Alpine skiing	19,000	Existing

== The Games ==
=== Sports ===
The initial sports programme will be determined during an IOC Session in 2028.

== Marketing ==
The Games were originally billed as Salt Lake City—Utah 2034 upon the approval of the bid, as the changes implemented by Olympic Agenda 2020 allow regions to be credited as Olympic hosts as opposed to only cities. On November 24, 2025, a new provisional emblem was unveiled, shortening the branding of the Games to simply Utah 2034; Organizing Committee CEO Brad Wilson explained that the new branding was meant to be more inclusive of the surrounding regions hosting the Games alongside Salt Lake City, stating that he "want[ed] everyone in Utah to feel like they're a part of Team 2034, whether they live in our amazing capital city or whether they live in Vernal or Layton." Salt Lake City mayor Erin Mendenhall felt that it "hurt" for the city to not be part of the branding, but that she wanted the Games to "uplift the state", and that Salt Lake City "always will be" an Olympic city.

== Broadcasting ==
On March 13, 2025, the IOC announced that Comcast would become a "strategic partner" of the organization, which will include the renewal of NBCUniversal's long-running broadcast rights to the Olympic Games in the United States through 2036 under an agreement valued at US$3 billion, and see Comcast partner with the IOC on various technological initiatives, including co-developing new digital advertising opportunities, and assisting Olympic Broadcasting Services (OBS) with in-venue distribution and its Olympic Video Player service.

== See also ==
- 2034 Winter Paralympics
- List of IOC country codes

Winter Olympics
Preceded by Alps	XXVII Olympic Winter Games; Utah; 2034	Succeeded by To be determined
