= Milan–Cortina d'Ampezzo bid for the 2026 Winter Olympics =

Bids for the 2026 Winter Olympics and Paralympics
Overview
- XXV Olympic Winter Games; XIV Paralympic Winter Games
- Winner: Milan–Cortina d'Ampezzo; Runner-up: Stockholm–Åre

Details
- City: Milan and Cortina d'Ampezzo, Italy
- Chair: Giovanni Malagò
- NOC: Italian National Olympic Committee (ITA)

Previous Games hosted
- None (Milan); 1956 Winter Olympics (Cortina d'Ampezzo); Bid for 1988 and 1992 (Cortina d'Ampezzo); Bid for 2000 Summer (Milan)

Decision
- Result: 47 votes (Winner)

Milan–Cortina d'Ampezzo 2026 (Italian: Milan–Cortina d'Ampezzo; Ampezzan: Milan-Anpezo 2026) was a successful bid for the 2026 Winter Olympics by the cities of Milan and Cortina d'Ampezzo and the Italian National Olympic Committee. The IOC selected Milan-Cortina d'Ampezzo to host the 2026 Winter Olympics at the 134th IOC Session in Lausanne, Switzerland on 24 June 2019.

== History ==
Considered Milan together with Valtellina as suitable candidates. The plan was for Milan to host the ice sports, while the snow sports would take place in Bormio, Santa Caterina di Valfurva and Livigno, which are already well-known destinations for Alpine skiing, cross-country skiing, snowboarding, biathlon, etc.

On 10 March 2018, the mayor of Turin, Chiara Appendino, confirmed on her Facebook page that a bid to host the Games on the 20th anniversary of the 2006 Winter Olympics was being explored. She suggested that the bid would introduce a new, revolutionary model for hosting the Games, with sustainability at the forefront. On 17 March, Appendino sent a letter to CONI officially expressing her support, after having resolved an initial split in support amongst fellow council members. The following week, municipal council gave the green light to start the procedure for the establishment of a "Torino 2026" association. The not-for-profit entity will have the task of overseeing the analysis and research necessary to evaluate the feasibility of an eventual candidature of Turin to host the Winter Olympics.

On 29 March 2018, two days before the deadline for cities to join the dialogue stage, it was confirmed that CONI would bid to host the 2026 Games in Milan and Turin and a letter of intent had been sent to the IOC. The bid is complicated by the fact that the 134th IOC Session is scheduled to be held in Milan in 2019. If an Italian city proceeds to the candidature stage, the venue for the IOC session will need to be changed to a different country.

A decision on which city leads the potential Italian bid for the 2026 Winter Olympic and Paralympic Games will be made on either 1 August or 17 September 2018. On 4 July 2018 the mayor of Turin, Chiara Appendino, announced in a conference the project and the candidacy for "Turin 2026", defining the opportunity of a double candidature with Milan "a chit-chat of the press I haven't seen yet". On 1 August 2018, CONI confirmed that all bidding cities will bid jointly using existing facilities and presented a proposal for a combined Cortina-Milan-Turin bid to CONI.

On 18 September 2018, the CONI announced it will present a bid with Milan and Cortina d'Ampezzo, excluding Turin after the city withdrew from the bid. On 19 September 2018, Italian Deputy Prime Minister Matteo Salvini said the Italian government would support a 2026 Winter Olympics bid. Furthermore, the CONI considered it would accept an eventual return of Turin in the Italian bid.

On 1 October 2018, the CONI confirmed the Milan–Cortina d'Ampezzo bid. Italian Government backs the Milan–Cortina bid for the 2026 Olympics, but will not make any financial investment. However, the regions of Lombardy and Veneto will try to finance the Games with private and public investments. On 21 January 2019 the Italian government supported the Milan–Cortina bid. On 1 April 2019 Milan–Cortina d'Ampezzo were chosen as host cities. It will be the first Olympics to be held in Milan, mark the 20th anniversary of the 2006 Olympics in Turin, the 70th anniversary of the 1956 Olympics in Cortina d'Ampezzo and the 80th anniversary of the Italian Republic.

=== Previous bids ===
Milan had never hosted the Games, but they submitted a bid for the 2000 Summer Olympics, but it was later withdrawn before eventually awarded to Sydney. Cortina d'Ampezzo hosted the 1956 Winter Olympics. The town failed in its attempts to secure the 1988 and 1992 Winter Olympics, losing out to Calgary and Albertville.

Italy hosted the Games three times and made seventeen bids (nine for Summer Games and seven for the Winter Olympics).

== Branding ==
The Candidate City logo was unveiled on 27 November 2018 during its presentation at the ANOC General Assembly in Tokyo, Japan. The logo of its candidature the bid logo is a stylised Milan Cathedral with a façade that turns into a mountain, echoing the Alps and the Dolomites. The logo's green, white and red spires reflect the Italian flag, with the design asserted to show the unity between Milan and Cortina.

The slogan "Dreaming Together" (Italian: Sognando insieme) was unveiled on 1 April 2019. The bid book and website was launched on 11 January 2019.

== Dates ==
The Winter Olympic Games will be from 6 to 22 February 2026 and the Winter Paralympic Games will be from 6 to 15 March 2026.

== Venues ==
Locations of the venues in Northern Italy

=== Milan Cluster ===
- San Siro – opening ceremony
- Mediolanum Forum – figure skating, short track
- PalaItalia – main ice hockey venue (planned despite the games)
- PalaLido – second ice hockey venue (planned despite the games)

=== Valtellina Cluster ===
- Bormio – alpine skiing
- Livigno – snowboarding, freestyle skiing

=== Cortina d'Ampezzo Cluster ===
- Cortina d'Ampezzo – alpine skiing (technical resort is in construction for FIS Alpine World Ski Championships 2021)
- Rasen-Antholz – biathlon
- Pista Eugenio Monti, Cortina – bobsleigh, luge and skeleton (modernisation and lighting works)
- Stadio Olimpico Del Ghiaccio, Cortina – curling

=== Val di Fiemme Cluster ===
- Trampolino Giuseppe Dal Ben, Predazzo – ski jumping, Nordic combined (wind net required)
- Lago di Tesero Cross Country Stadium – cross-country skiing, Nordic combined
- Baselga di Piné – speed skating (venue to be rebuilt)

=== Verona ===
- Verona Arena – closing ceremony
