= 134th IOC Session =

IOC session in Lausanne, Switzerland, 24-26 June 2019

The 134th IOC Session was the IOC Session which was held in Lausanne, Switzerland, on 24 June 2019.

== Bidders ==
Milan, Italy, was the sole bidder to host the 134th IOC Session and was elected in a unanimous vote at the 131st IOC Session in Lima in September 2017. However, in 2018 there was a late Italian bid to host the 2026 Winter Olympics in Milan and Cortina d'Ampezzo (which hosted the 1956 Winter Olympics). The Olympic Charter does not allow a session to take place in a country that has a candidate for the Olympic Games awarded at the session. Consequently, the IOC session was moved to the SwissTech Convention Center in Lausanne.

== 2026 Winter Olympics host city election ==
The host city of the 2026 Winter Olympics was elected at the 134th IOC Session. Bids were submitted to the IOC in 2018.

=== Votes results ===
2026 Winter Olympics bidding results
City	Nation	Votes
Milan–Cortina d'Ampezzo	Italy	47
Stockholm–Åre	Sweden	34

=== New IOC headquarters inauguration ===
The International Olympic Committee (IOC) officially inaugurated its new headquarters in Lausanne, Switzerland, on 23 June during the celebration of Olympic Day. In 2019 this symbolic day marks the 125th anniversary of the creation of the IOC.

== Election of new IOC members ==
Ten new IOC members were elected at the session. The new members are:

- Odette Assembe-Engoulou – Cameroon
- Filomena Fortes – President of Cape Verde Olympic Committee
- Matlohang Moiloa-Ramoqopo – President of Lesotho National Olympic Committee
- Tidjane Thiam – Ivory Coast
- Laura Chinchilla – Costa Rica
- (Indonesia) Erick Thohir – President of Indonesian Olympic Committee
- (Greece) Spyros Capralos – President of Greek Olympic Committee
- (Algeria) Mustapha Berraf – President of Algerian Olympic Committee and Association of National Olympic Committees of Africa
- (India) Narinder Dhruv Batra – President of Indian Olympic Association
- (South Korea) Kee Heung Lee – President of Korean Sport & Olympic Committee
