= Bids for the 2030 Summer Youth Olympics =

Multi-sport event

V Summer Youth Olympic Games

The 2030 Summer Youth Olympics, officially known as the V Summer Youth Olympic Games, will be the fifth edition of the Summer Youth Olympics, an international sports, education and cultural festival for teenagers, in a city designated by the International Olympic Committee (IOC).

In 2026, IOC president Kirsty Coventry announced a restructuring of the Olympic movement and a pause on awarding any future editions of the Youth Olympic Games.

== Bidding ==
=== Bidding process ===
The new IOC bidding process was approved at the 134th IOC Session in Lausanne, Switzerland. The key proposals driven by the relevant recommendations from Olympic Agenda 2020, are:

- Establish a permanent, ongoing dialogue to explore and create interest among cities/regions/countries and National Olympic Committees for any Olympic event
- Create two Future Host Commissions (Summer and Winter Games) to oversee interest in future Olympic events and report to the IOC executive board
- Give the IOC Session more influence by having non-EB members form part of the Future Host Commissions

IOC also modified the Olympic Charter to increase flexibility by removing the date of election from 7 years before the games, and changing the host as a city to multiple cities, regions, or countries.

==== Future Host Summer Commissions ====
The full composition of the Summer Commissions, oversee interested hosts, or with potential hosts where the IOC may want to create interest, is as follows:

Future Host Summer Commissions for 2030 Summer Youth Olympics
| IOC members (4) | Other members (4) |
|---|---|
| (Croatia) Kolinda Grabar-Kitarović (chair); (Dominican Republic) Luis Mejía Oviedo; (Cape Verde) Filomena Fortes; (United States) Anita DeFrantz | (New Zealand) Sarah Walker (Athletes); (Belgium) Ingmar De Vos (ASOIF); (Kenya) Paul Tergat (NOCs); (Brazil) Andrew Parsons (IPC) |

==== Dialogue stages ====
According to Future Host Commission terms of reference with rules of conduct, the new IOC bidding system is divided to 2 dialogue stages are:

- Continuous Dialogue: Non-committal discussions between the IOC and Interested Parties (City/Region/Country/NOC interested in hosting) with regard to hosting future Olympic events.
- Targeted Dialogue: Targeted discussions with one or more Interested Parties (called Preferred Host(s)), as instructed by the IOC Executive Board. This follows a recommendation by the Future Host Commission as a result of Continuous Dialogue.

==== Timeline ====
- Future Summer Host Commission meeting (16–17 January 2020)

=== Confirmed bids ===
Three cities made the preferred host target by the IOC on 10 December 2025. The host was originally to be elected during the 146th IOC Session on 24 or 25 June 2026, but was put on hold in May 2026 by the Executive Board for them to re-evaluate the core objectives of holding the Youth Olympic Games under the "Fit for the Future" process initiated by IOC president Kirsty Coventry.

| City | Country | National Olympic Committee |
| Santiago | Chile | Chilean Olympic Committee (COCh) |
|---|---|---|
On 21 April 2025, the former Chilean Minister of Sports, Jaime Pizarro announced that the government had sent an official letter to the president of the Chilean Olympic Committee and the International Olympic Committee applying to host the 2030 Youth Olympic Games. The bid is part of several candidacies to host sporting events after the successful 2023 Pan American Games in Santiago, including the 2025 FIFA U-20 World Cup, the 2027 Special Olympics World Summer Games and a potential bid for the 2036 Summer Olympics. On 20 March 2026, Chilean president José Antonio Kast ratified the decision to support the candidacy for the 2030 Youth Olympic Games. On 6 October 2026, the Chilean Olympic Committee announced it would withdraw its bid for the 2036 Summer Olympics to focus on bidding for the 2030 Summer Youth Olympics.
| Asunción | Paraguay | Paraguayan Olympic Committee (COP) |
On 31 January 2025, the president of Paraguay, Santiago Peña, the president of the Paraguayan Olympic Committee, Camilo López, and Deputy Secretary General of the organizing committee for the 2025 Junior Pan American Games, Larissa Schaerer, travelled to the headquarters of the International Olympic Committee (IOC) in Lausanne, Switzerland, to present a bid for Paraguay to host the 2030 Summer Youth Olympics. López said that "the Youth Olympic Games are the pinnacle of what we can aspire to organize, given the size of our country.” He also confirmed that the president, Santiago Peña, had signed a letter of guarantee to Panam Sports for Paraguay to bid for the 2031 Pan American Games.
| Bangkok and Chonburi | Thailand | National Olympic Committee of Thailand (NOCT) |
Main article: Bangkok–Chonburi bid for the 2030 Summer Youth Olympics In September 2017, Khun Ying Patama Leeswadtrakul suggested the country should bid for the Youth Olympic Games firstly, the potentially awarded global sport events, after International Olympic Committee (IOC) awarded Paris and Los Angeles hosting 2024 and 2028 Summer Olympics respectively during 131st IOC Session. She was also elected as IOC member at this IOC session. Her idea was supported by the President of NOCT, Deputy Prime Minister Gen. Prawit Wongsuwan. Khun Ying Patama and Gen. Prawit made a strong interest to host the next Summer Youth Olympics to IOC President Thomas Bach during 2018 Winter Olympics in Pyeongchang, South Korea. During the 2018 SportAccord Convention in Bangkok, President Bach attended to this convention, and met the Prime Minister, Gen. Prayuth Chan-o-cha at Thai-Khu-Fah Building, Government House of Thailand. Gen. Prayuth offered to IOC for bidding for 2026 Summer Youth Olympics. On 2 October, the Cabinet of Thailand approved the plan of the bid 2026 Youth Olympics by the Ministry of Tourism and Sports, Ministry of Tourism and Sports offered estimated income and revolving money from the games about 1,000 million Thai baht. On 12 October, Minister Weerasak Kowsurat, IOC member Khun Ying Patama Leeswadtrakul, Sport Authority of Thailand governor Kongsak Yodmanee, and ANOC member and NOCT advisor Somsak Leeswadtrakul visited to observe 2018 Summer Youth Olympics in Buenos Aires, Argentina. They also met IOC president Thomas Bach and chairman of the organizing committee, Leandro Larosa, discussing guidelines for their 2026 Youth Olympics bid. During the 2020 Winter Youth Olympics in Lausanne, Switzerland on 17 January 2020, IOC member Khun Ying Patama Leeswadtrakul, Government representative — Minister of Tourism and Sports Pipat Ratchakitprakan, NOCT representative — Gen.Ronnachai Munchusoontornkul, and SAT Governor Kongsak Yodmanee met President of the IOC, Thomas Bach, to deliver the governmental guarantee for the 2026 Summer Youth Olympics and anti-doping engagements from the government, after the Thai Amateur Weightlifting Association was suspended for multiple doping offences and an anti-doping lab in Thailand was shut down. On 15 May 2020, Thailand formally presented its bid to host the 2030 Youth Olympic Games in an online conference. The presentation highlighted key aspects, including the competition format, venue selection, event organization, timeline, and the unique appeal of Thailand’s hosting vision. On 5 June, a bid committee meeting took place for the second time. They received a letter from the International Olympic Committee (IOC) for a confirmation that the Bangkok–Chonburi bid has already taken part in the permanent, ongoing dialogue of the new bidding process. In 2022, it was announced that a bid is set to be confirmed in the following year. In April 2024, it was reported that the bid had entered a dialogue phase with the International Olympic Committee. It was also reported that the bid would only use existing venues, such as the newly renovated Queen Sirikit National Convention Center. The presenting of Thailand's hosting proposal was given a deadline for 11 March 2025. In May 2026, around the time when the awarding was paused, it was reported that the Government of Thailand was withdrawing support for the bid due to an alleged lack of budget and preparedness, putting the bid in limbo.

=== Interested parties ===
The following were interested bidding parties for the 2030 Summer Youth Olympics, who took part in targeted dialogue with the IOC and Future Host Commission, but were not selected as a preferred host:

==== Asia ====
| City | Country | National Olympic Committee |
| Ahmedabad, Delhi or Bhubaneswar | India | Indian Olympic Association (IOA) |
|---|---|---|
In April 2018, the IOC President Thomas Bach met the president of the Indian Olympic Association Narinder Batra on his India trip. The two leaders discussed the future of Olympic sport in the country - particularly looking ahead to the 2020 Summer Olympics in Tokyo. They also spoke about a possible candidature of India to host the 2026 Summer Youth Olympics and a strong interest in the 2032 Summer Olympics and Paralympics. Later, IOC member Nita Ambani expressed a commitment for a Mumbai candidature for the Youth Olympic Games 2026, as well as a strong interest in the 2032 Summer Olympics, before it was awarded to Brisbane, Australia. Narendra Batra revealed that the 2026 Summer Youth Olympics will either be held in either Delhi or Bhubaneswar. Batra virtually ruled out Mumbai – the third city in the running – since the infrastructure there will have to be constructed from scratch. India also hosted the 140th IOC Session in Mumbai in 2023. On 2 May 2020, at a press conference, Batra said that the IOA is serious in bidding for the event and will start the preparation of bidding documents when the COVID-19 pandemic eases. In October 2023, Prime Minister Narendra Modi also intended for India to host the Youth Olympic Games, as well as the 2036 Summer Olympics.
| Ulaanbaatar | Mongolia | Mongolian National Olympic Committee (MNOC) |
During the 141st IOC Session in Mumbai, India in 2023, the Mongolian National Olympic Committee was one of 10 National Olympic Committees to have attended a roundtable meeting regarding future candidates for the Youth Olympic Games. Mongolia confirmed announced its candidacy to host the 2030 or 2034 Summer Youth Olympic Games.

==== Europe ====
| City | Country | National Olympic Committee |
| Sarajevo | Bosnia and Herzegovina | Olympic Committee of Bosnia and Herzegovina (OKBiH) |
|---|---|---|
On September 27, 2023, the Olympic Committee of Bosnia and Herzegovina president Izet Rađo announced that Bosnia and Herzegovina would prepare a bid to host the Youth Olympic Games in the future, though it was not specified whether they were pursuing either the Summer or Winter Youth Olympic Games. Sarajevo previously hosted the 1984 Winter Olympics and the 2019 European Youth Olympic Winter Festival.
| Copenhagen | Denmark | National Olympic Committee and Sports Confederation of Denmark (DIF) |
In 2023, a year after a proposal for Copenhagen to bid to host a small-budget 2036 Summer Olympics, several political parties in Denmark agreed on a declaration of intent to bring the Youth Olympics to the capital Copenhagen. The mayor of the Culture and Leisure Committee of the Copenhagen City Council, Mia Nyegaard, stated that "It must happen in either 2030 or 2034, and must be a step on the way to making Copenhagen relevant as an Olympic host." In September 2024, Copenhagen City Council would budget 500,000 kroner to explore a 2036 Olympic bid, and the funds will also be used to submit a bid for the 2030 Youth Olympics.

==== North America ====
| City | Country | National Olympic Committee |
| Mexico City, Guadalajara, Monterrey or Tijuana | Mexico | Mexican Olympic Committee (COM) |
|---|---|---|
On 16 January 2024, Mexico withdrew their bid for the 2036 Summer Olympics, citing tough competition, instead focusing on bidding for other events such as the Pan American Games and the Youth Olympic Games, which they believe they will have a better chance at hosting.

==== South America ====
| City | Country | National Olympic Committee |
| Cartagena or Medellín | Colombia | Colombian Olympic Committee (COC) |
|---|---|---|
In September 2019, the IOC President Thomas Bach met the President of the Republic of Colombia, Iván Duque Márquez. Duque expressed a strong interest in a candidature of Cartagena for the Youth Olympic Games in 2026, and they also discussed the programme of the Olympic Refuge Foundation in Colombia. However, when COVID-19 pandemic hit the world and resulted in the postponement of Dakar's 2022 Games to 2026, it was revealed that the year it qualified for the bid was 2030. In January 2020, it was told Medellín would bid again for the Summer Youth Olympics, after losing the 2018 bid against Buenos Aires. Later in February, the Colombian Olympic Committee agreed on Medellín as the country's bid for the Olympics.
| Lima | Peru | Peruvian Olympic Committee (COP) |
In March 2024, Peru was elected as host of the 2027 Pan American Games, replacing Barranquilla, Colombia. Lima also previously hosted the 2019 Pan American Games. Shortly after winning the bid, the president of the Peruvian Olympic Committee, Renzo Manyari Velazco, said that one of his country's next sporting objectives is to host the Youth Olympic Games.

=== Cancelled, suspended, or rejected bids ===
| City | Country | National Olympic Committee |
| TBA | Indonesia | Indonesian Olympic Committee (KOI) |
|---|---|---|
In March 2025, the Indonesian Olympic Committee entered the bidding process to host the 2030 Youth Olympic Games. This move highlighted the country's commitment to developing world-class sports infrastructure and leveraging its experience from previous major multi-sport events, such as the 2011 SEA Games and the 2018 Asian Games, both held in Jakarta and Palembang. On 22 October 2025, the IOC announced that they would end dialogue with the Indonesian Olympic Committee regarding bidding for the 2030 Summer Youth Olympics, 2036 Summer Olympics (which Indonesia bid to host in Nusantara) or any future Games after Indonesia denied the visas of Israeli athletes competing in the 2025 World Artistic Gymnastics Championships in Jakarta. The IOC further stated that this would continue until the Indonesian government provided them with "adequate guarantees that it will allow access to the country for all participants, regardless of nationality, to attend". As such, the Indonesia bid has effectively been suspended for the time being.

==== Europe ====
| City | Country | National Olympic Committee |
| Kazan | Russia | Russian Olympic Committee (ROC) |
|---|---|---|
In December 2019, Minister of Sports of the Republic of Tatarstan, Vladimir Leonov confirmed that Kazan intended to apply for the 2026 Youth Olympics (which later went to Dakar, Senegal after the postponement of the games to 2026). Kazan hosted the 2013 Summer Universiade and several matches of the 2018 FIFA World Cup, and was the planned host of the 2022 Special Olympics World Winter Games. However, following the country's invasion of Ukraine since 2022, the IOC has barred any sporting events from being held in Russia or Belarus, causing the cancellation of the Special Olympics World Winter Games, and further in 2023, the IOC Executive Board suspended the Russian Olympic Committee's membership, hence revoking any right-of-bids for any Russian cities.
| Kyiv or Odesa | Ukraine | National Olympic Committee of Ukraine (NOCU) |
In August 2021, Ukrainian sports minister Vadym Huttsait announced that Ukraine could bid for the Youth Olympics of 2030 and the 2036 Summer Olympics with either the capital Kyiv or the port city Odesa. The country has never hosted the Olympics nor Youth Olympics. If awarded, it would mark the first time that the country has hosted an IOC sanctioned event, Ukraine could also bid for the 2028 or 2032 Winter Youth Olympic Games. However, with Russia invading the country in February 2022, the plans for the bidding was significantly disrupted.

== The Games ==
=== Sports ===
The International Cricket Council (ICC) had indicated that they are likely to collaborate with the IOC to include cricket in the 2030 Summer Youth Olympics, following cricket's inclusion in the 2028 Summer Olympics.

== Broadcasting rights ==
- Brazil – Grupo Globo
- China – CMG
- South Korea – JTBC
- Thailand – Siam Sport and Thairath TV
- United States – NBCUniversal
- Europe – Eurosport and European Broadcasting Union

| Preceded by Dakar | Summer Youth Olympic Games; TBA; 2030 | Succeeded by TBA |
