= Bangkok–Chonburi bid for the 2030 Summer Youth Olympics =

Thai bid to host the Youth Olympics

Bids for the 2026 Summer Youth Olympics
Overview
- Games of the V Youth Olympiad

Details
- City: Bangkok, and Chonburi, Thailand
- Chair: Vitch Devahastin Na Ayudhya, Gen
- NOC: National Olympic Committee of Thailand (THA)

Previous Games hosted
- none

Bangkok–Chonburi is an official bid for the Summer Youth Olympics by the city of Bangkok and the province of Chonburi and the National Olympic Committee of Thailand. The bid was originally made for the 2026 Games, but after the postponement of the 2022 Summer Youth Olympics in Dakar to 2026, the earliest Thailand could host the games became 2030. It was the second time of Thailand and the city of Bangkok bid the Youth Olympic Games after conceding to Singapore in the bidding for the 2010 Summer Youth Olympics.

== Background ==
Bangkok, Thailand bid for the 2010 Summer Youth Olympics after the successful of 1998 Asian Games and 2007 Summer Universiade, but eliminated from shortlist, then the ASEAN counterpart, Singapore, won the inaugural YOG. At Bangkok's elimination, the major factors were too low a budget (US$34 million), widespread venues which again would have caused too great travel times, and with Thailand's recent political upheavals, concerns over upcoming elections and lack of government guarantees.

After successful of inaugural bid, late IOC member Nat Indrapana mulled for the bid 2022 Summer Youth Olympics, and planned to use Thammasat University in Rangsit, Pathum Thani Province and Huamark Sport Complex in Bangkok, according to IOC preference to reduce costs from new venues.

The bid for 2026 Summer Youth Olympics was initiated idea of IOC member Khun Ying Patama Leeswadtrakul after elected as IOC member during 131st IOC Session in Lima, Peru Her idea was supported by the President of NOCT, Deputy Prime Minister Gen. Prawit Wongsuwan. Khun Ying Patama and Gen. Prawit made a strong interest to host next Summer Youth Olympics to the IOC President Thomas Bach during 2018 Winter Olympics in Pyeongchang, South Korea. During 2018 SportAccord Convention in Bangkok, President Bach attended to this convention, visited Thailand women's national volleyball team and Thailand national futsal team at Huamark National Sport Training Center and met the Prime Minister Gen. Prayuth Chan-o-cha at Thai-Khu-Fah Building, Government House of Thailand. Gen. Prayuth offered to IOC for inclusion Mauy Thai fot medal event in 2024 Summer Olympics in Paris. France, and bidding for 2026 Summer Youth Olympics.

=== Previous bids ===
Both Bangkok and Chonburi Province had never hosted the Games. Thailand and Bangkok made two bids (2008 Summer Olympics and 2010 Summer Youth Olympics), but both were eliminated before final votes.

Outside of Olympics, both cities were gained host of 2021 Asian Indoor and Martial Arts Games, but in 2024 the OCA decided to cancel AIMAG 2021 after several postpone announcements due to COVID-19 pandemic, and failed to meet contractual obligations. Both, alongside Songkhla, will host 2025 SEA Games.

== Bid preparation ==
=== 2018 ===
On 15 March, during NOCT Executive Board meeting, Khun Ying Patama Leeswadtrakul representative revealed that she discussed IOC President Thomas Bach about 2026 Youth Olympics bid and NOCT EB appointed NOCT Secretary General Maj. Gen. Jaruek Areeradchakaaran to chairman of the bid committee for presentation to Ministry of Tourism and Sports.

During SportAccord Convention, on 17 April, Thomas Bach with IOC executive board members: Juan Antonio Samaranch, Jr., Anita DeFrantz, Yu Zaiqing, Christophe De Kepper,

On 28 April, Ittipol Kunplome, Minister consultant of Tourism and Sports, is the chair of city selection for bidding 2026 Summer Youth Olympics commission. He revealed that Pattaya will be served for beach and water sports and other sport will be held in Bangkok.

During the 2018 Asian Games in Jakarta, Indonesia, Maj. Gen. Jaruek Areeradchakaaran revealed that Thailand had no interest in the future Asian Games after held in 1998 in Bangkok but have interest in only Youth Olympics because the government have supported this event.

On 3 September, Khun Ying Patama Leeswadtrakul was confident that Thailand will host 2026 Summer Youth Olympics and defeat India due to many experiences of Thailand. She revealed that among Maj. Gen. Jaruek Areeradchakaaran, Minister Weerasak Kowsurat, and others nation sport keymans agreed that YOG will make benefits to Thailand if nation hosts. She also revealed that Chiang Mai Province, Chonburi Province, and Phuket Province are the short lists of the host.

On 2 October, the Cabinet of Thailand approved the plan of the bid 2026 Youth Olympics by Ministry of Tourism and Sports, Ministry of Tourism and Sports offered estimated income and revolving money from the games about 1,000 million Thai baht.

On 12 October, Minister Weerasak Kowsurat, IOC member Khun Ying Patama Leeswadtrakul, Sport Authority of Thailand governor Kongsak Yodmanee, and ANOC member and NOCT advisor Somsak Leeswadtrakul visited to observe 2018 Summer Youth Olympics in Buenos Aires, Argentina. They also met IOC president Thomas Bach and chairman of organizing committee Leandro Larosa, discussing guidelines for a 2026 Youth Olympics bid. Minister Weerasak said "After Argentine economic crisis, they organized the games with reduced costs. They used temporary venues with the existing and raised only 200 million US dollar. He also planned to use venues that near railway transits: Bangkok Metropolitan Region Mass Rapid Transit and High-speed rail.

After the cabinet made Ministry of Tourism and Sports study the plan of 2026 Youth Olympics, Sport Authority of Thailand vice governor Natthawut Reungwaes revealed that the committee planned to use temporary venues and build new venues if necessary.

On 6 November, Sport Authority of Thailand executive board visited Sport England and World Academy of Sport in Manchester, United Kingdom. They workshopped how England executes in sport. Manchester model is the prototype for Thailand's sport cities. Manchester held the 2002 Commonwealth Games to impel their citizen to exercise and interest in sport activities. This model is also the guideline to host the 2026 Youth Olympics.

=== 2019 ===
On 15 January, SAT visited and evaluated Chonburi about feasibility to be host the 2026 games, since this province situate at Eastern Economic Corridor and is served by many infrastructures such as U-Tapao International Airport and Eastern High-speed rail travelling from Bangkok to Chonburi in 30 minutes.

On 2 February, Chonburi administrators selected venues in Mueang Chonburi District, Saen Suk City, Bang Lamung District, Pattaya City, and Sattahip District and Ambassador City Jomtien will serve for athletes accommodation.

During Olympic Council of Asia (OCA) General Assembly in Bangkok, NOCT Secretary Maj.Gen. Charouck Arirachakaran spoke about a possible candidature of Thailand to host 2021 Asian Indoor and Martial Arts Games, 2025 Asian Youth Games, 2026 Summer Youth Olympics and 2030 Asian Games.

On 13 August, SAT discussed the Governor of Chonburi, Phakkhrathon Thianchai, and other administrators in Chonburi and made the host application to delivered IOC in South Korea at the end of this month SAT also evaluated the feasibility of 2034 FIFA World Cup joint-bid with Indonesia, Malaysia, Singapore and Vietnam, and spoke about the new National Sport Complex in Bang Lamung, Chonburi instead Huamark Sport Complex with 80,000 capacity stadium for serving the 2026 Summer Youth Olympics and 2034 FIFA World Cup.

During OCA Solidarity Regional Forum in Bangkok, IOC member Khun Ying Patama Leeswadtrakul revealed the plan of the 2026 Summer Youth Olympics that Huamark Sport Complex in Bangkok will serve for this games together with Chonburi. On 18 November 2019, the bid committee met IOC member Ng Ser Miang and observed the Singapore Youth Olympic Games Organising Committee. Then, the bid committee consulted Dentsu Inc., the Olympic and Paralympic Games marketing agency and NOCT sponsor, in Tokyo, Japan about the 2026 Summer Youth Olympics bid

=== 2020 ===
During 2020 Winter Youth Olympics in Lausanne, Switzerland on 17 January 2020, IOC member Khun Ying Patama Leeswadtrakul, Government representative — Minister of Tourism and Sports Pipat Ratchakitprakan, NOCT representative — Gen.Ronnachai Munchusoontornkul, and SAT Governor Kongsak Yodmanee met President of IOC Thomas Bach to deliver the governmental guarantee for 2026 Summer Youth Olympics and anti-doping engagements from the government after Thai Amateur Weightlifting Association suspended for multiple doping offences and Anti-doping lab in Thailand shut down. Khun Ying Patama will present to Bach about benefits and legacies that Thailand will be received from Youth Olympics, and insisting on reductions to the games' budget, inheriting Olympism and Olympic Movement through Olympic Education, Culture and Environment, and the public supports. She also will introduce a 12-player junior association football team "Wild Boar team" trapped inside the Tham Luang Nang Non as the bid ambassadors. They were honored by the International Olympic Committee with an invitation to the 2018 Summer Youth Olympics, Buenos Aires. Thomas Bach said "Thanks the delegation from Thailand for your visit and excellent cooperation with IOC since Khun Ying Patama elected to be IOC member and have mediated between Thailand and IOC so far. However, IOC haven't supported any country was in doping violations to be host of IOC's event." He also suggested "Thailand should deliver the official letter to World Anti-Doping Agency for expressing determination. If Thailand cope with doping successfully, Thailand will award to host the Youth Olympics definitely"

On 15 May, a bid committee proposed a joint candidacy from Bangkok and Chonburi Province and planned to send their intention to bid to the International Olympic Committee (IOC) within the next week. A slogan of "by Youth with Youth for Youth" was also announced by a bid committee.

On 5 June, a bid committee meeting took place for the second time. They received a letter form the International Olympic Committee (IOC) for a confirmation that Bangkok–Chonburi bid have already taken part in the permanent, ongoing dialogue of the new bidding process. They also proposed number of sports are as same as previous games in 2018 and 2022 Summer Youth Olympics, but added muaythai and sepak takraw to increase local appeal and promote Thai culture and venues shall locate in universities throughout Bangkok and Chonburi Province. The office of a bid committee will locate in Sport Authority of Thailand.

Because the 2022 Summer Youth Olympics was postponed to 2026 due to the COVID-19 pandemic and the postponement of the 2020 Summer Olympic Games in Tokyo causing knock-on scheduling issues for other IOC events, the earliest Thailand could host the games is now 2030. Kongsak insisted on Thailand's bid status that still continues and its plan may be adjust to this change. He revealed that Thailand will plan to bid Asian Youth Games prior to 2030 for building confidence to the IOC. It means that Thailand will bid 2029 Asian Youth Games after Shantou of China was awarded in 2021 and Tashkent of Uzbekistan was awarded in 2025.

On 31 July, Khun Ying Patama revealed that Kristin Kloster Aasen, chairman of the IOC Future Host Commission for the Games of the Olympiad, sent a letter to Sport Authority of Thailand and National Olympic Committee of Thailand about updating host selection processes and thanked Thailand for reporting the progress bid during a permanent, ongoing dialogue phase. Aasen complimented the bid plan that promotes Olympic values among nationwide pupils with encouraging a better society and world creation for youth. She also appreciated that Thailand giving importance on making the fair competition through anti-doping awareness education.

On 4 August, SAT Governor Kongsak insisted that Thailand bid Youth Olympic Games in 2030. He prepared to inform the change of the year of bid to the Thai Royal Government and IOC. Then, the Cabinet of Thailand approved the postponement of the 5th Youth Olympic Games from 2026 to 2030, due to 2022 Summer Youth Olympics postponement.

=== 2022 ===
In November 2022, the president of the National Sports Development Fund, Dr.Supranee Guptasa stated that they are preparing on announcing a bid the following year.

=== 2024 ===
In April 2024, it was reported that the bid had entered a dialogue phase with the International Olympic Committee. It was also reported that the bid would only use existing venues, such as the newly built Queen Sirikit National Convention Center.

=== 2025 ===
On 11 March 2025, Thailand formally presented its bid to host the 2030 Youth Olympic Games in an online conference. The presentation highlighted key aspects, including the competition format, venue selection, event organization, timeline, and the unique appeal of Thailand's hosting vision.

== Bid process ==
It is the first Summer Youth Olympic Games with the new bidding process, and the second Youth Olympic Games after Gangwon Province, South Korea won 2024 Winter Youth Olympics at the 136th IOC Session in Lausanne, Switzerland. Thailand have already taken part in a permanent, ongoing dialogue with IOC Future Host Commission for the Games of the Olympiad under the umbrella of the International Olympic Committee.

=== IOC Future Host Commission for the Games of the Olympiad ===
The new IOC bidding process was approved at the 134th IOC Session in Lausanne, Switzerland. The key proposals driven by the relevant recommendations from Olympic Agenda 2020, are:

- Establish a permanent, ongoing dialogue to explore and create interest among cities/regions/countries and National Olympic Committees for any Olympic event
- Create two Future Host Commissions (Summer and Winter Games) to oversee interest in future Olympic events and report to the IOC executive board
- Give the IOC Session more influence by having non-EB members form part of the Future Host Commissions

IOC also modified Olympic Charter to increase flexibility by removing the date of election from 7 years before the games, and changing the host as a city to multiple cities, regions, or countries.

The full composition of the Summer Commissions, oversee interested hosts, or with potential hosts where the IOC may want to create interest, is as follows:

Future Host Summer Commissions for 2030 Summer Youth Olympics
IOC members (6)	Other members (4)
(Norway) Kristin Kloster Aasen (chair); (Canada) Dick Pound; (China) Li Lingwei; (Philippines) Mikee Cojuangco-Jaworski; (Dominican Republic) Luis Mejía Oviedo; (Cape Verde) Filomena Fortes	(New Zealand) Sarah Walker (Athletes); (Italy) Francesco Ricci Bitti (ASOIF); (Kenya) Paul Tergat (NOCs); (Brazil) Andrew Parsons (IPC)

== Bid details ==
=== Sports ===
On 5 June 2020, the bid committee proposed the programme of the 2026 Summer Youth Olympics shall include 35 sports competed in 2018 and 2022 Summer Youth Olympics, along with Thailand originated sports, muaythai and sepak takraw to increase local appeal and promote Thai culture.

Muaythai is the national combat sport, recognized by International Olympic Committee as the member of Association of IOC Recognised International Sports Federations. Muaythai is currently the official programme of the World Games. If muaythai included in the games, Thailand will be the fourth country in Asia that its combat sport is included in the Olympic events other Japan's judo and karate, Korea's taekwondo, and China's wushu and it will be the stepping stone for Olympic inclusion.

Sepak takraw is the sport originated in Thailand and Malaysia. It is currently the official programme of the Asian Games, dominated by Thailand in the competition.

=== Venues ===
According to reports in April 2024, the bid would only use existing venues, such as the Queen Sirikit National Convention Center.

=== Transportation and infrastructure ===
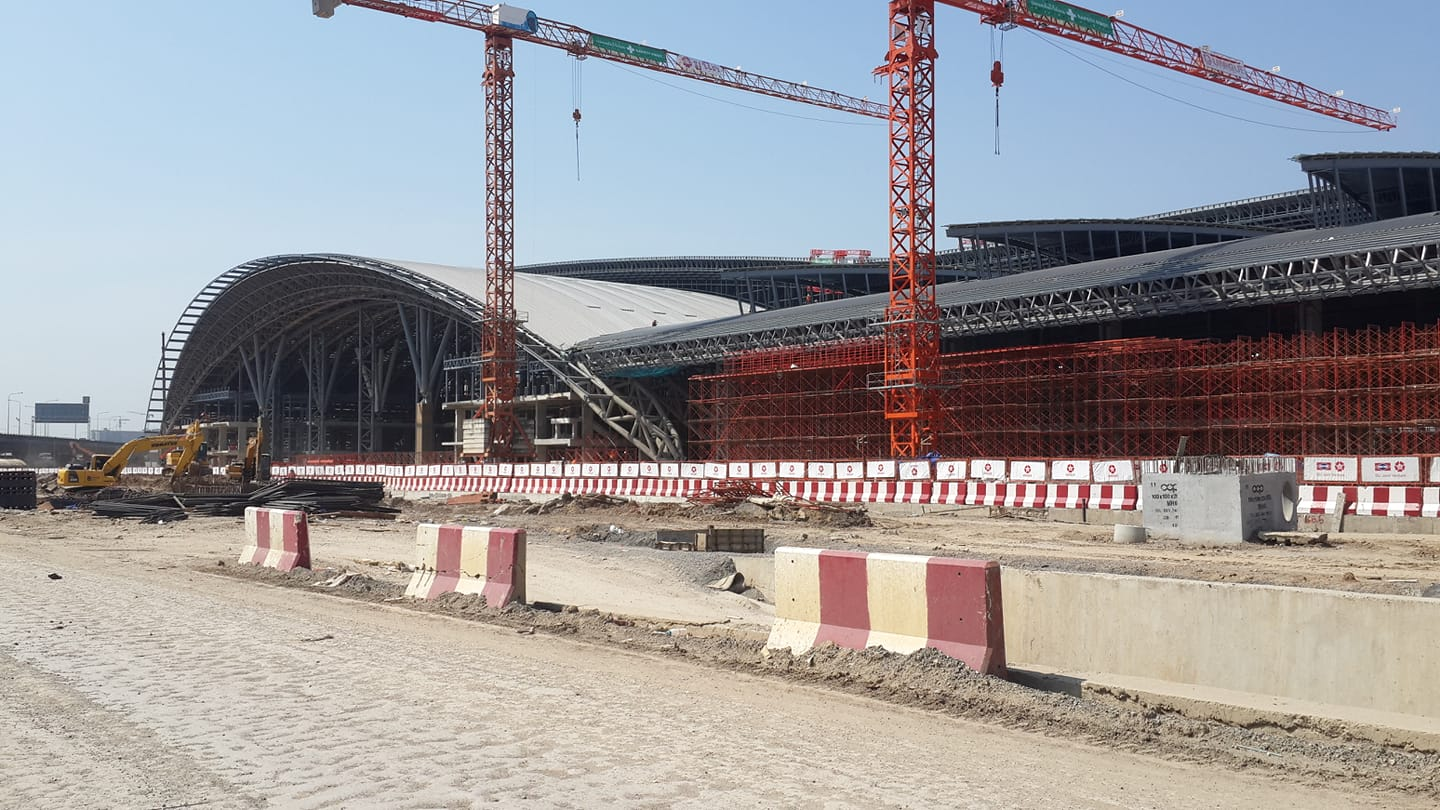
Bang Sue Central Station under construction in January 2019.

Situated at Eastern Economic Corridor, Chonburi Province have progressed many infrastructural projects and seamless operation of transportation in providing vital linkages for air, land, rail and sea routes. The venues of the 2026 Summer Youth Olympics will be served by Don Mueang International Airport (40,758,148 passengers) in Pathum Thani Province, Suvarnabhumi Airport (63,378,923 passengers) in Samut Prakan Province, and U-Tapao International Airport (1,860,794 passengers) in Rayong Province. In December 2019, U-Tapao International Airport opened the second terminal that have increased the total passenger capacity to 5 million over 5 years. The next phase of local airport is to establish the third terminal that will have increased the total passenger capacity to 60 million over 20 years.

By 2020, the Motorway 7 third extension will have operated that link Pattaya to U-Tapao Airport. It will link seamlessly between Suvarnabhumi Airport and U-Tapao Airport.

By 2023, the Eastern High-speed rail line will have operated that will link Don Mueang and Suvarnabhumi with 160 km per hour (Today is Airport Rail Link) and will link Suvarnabhumi and U-Tapao with 250 km per hour. It would be a compact Youth Olympic Games, with travel times of less than 30 minutes between Chonburi Province and Bangkok.
