= Bids for the 2036 Summer Olympics =

Upcoming multi-sport event

Games of the XXXVI Olympiad

The 2036 Summer Olympics, officially known as the Games of the XXXVI Olympiad, is a future international multi-sport event. This edition celebrates the centennial of the Olympic torch relay, a tradition that began in 1936. The host city will be selected in mid-2029.

== Bidding process ==
The new IOC bidding process was approved at the 134th IOC Session on 24 June 2019 in Lausanne, Switzerland. The key proposals, driven by the relevant recommendations from Olympic Agenda 2020, are:

- Establish a permanent, ongoing dialogue to explore and create interest among cities/regions/countries and National Olympic Committees for any Olympic event
- Create two Future Host Commissions (Summer and Winter Games) to oversee interest in future Olympic events and report to the IOC executive board
- Give the IOC Session more influence by having non-executive board members form part of the Future Host Commissions.

The IOC also modified the Olympic Charter to increase its flexibility by removing the date of election from 7 years before the Games, and changing the host as a city from a single city/region/country to multiple cities, regions, or countries.

=== Reforms ===
The change in the bidding process was criticised by members of the German bid as "incomprehensible" and hard to surpass "in terms of non-transparency". Following the election of Kirsty Coventry as IOC president in 2025, she announced a review of issues facing the Olympics, including the new bidding process. Details on host city election reform were partly announced at the 145th IOC Session in 2026, which included more transparency and a proposed "short-list stage". The short-list stage, referred to as "strategic dialogue", will begin in March 2027, with targeted dialogue to start in late 2028.

=== Future Host Commission ===
The full composition of the Future Host Commission for the Summer Games, to oversee the selection process, is as follows:

Future Host Commission for the 2036 Summer Olympics
IOC members (5)	Other members (4)
(Croatia) Kolinda Grabar-Kitarović (chair); (United States) Anita DeFrantz; (Cape Verde) Filomena Fortes; (Japan) Yuki Ota; (Dominican Republic) Luis Mejía Oviedo	(New Zealand) Sarah Walker (Athletes); (France) David Lappartient (ASOIF); (Kenya) Paul Tergat (NOCs); (Brazil) Andrew Parsons (IPC)

=== Dialogue stages ===
The new IOC bidding system is divided into 3 dialogue stages are:

- Continuous Dialogue: Non-committal discussions between the IOC and Interested Parties (City/Region/Country/NOC interested in hosting) concerning hosting future Olympic events.
- Strategic Dialogue: In-depth evaluation of detailed plans by shortlisted, interested parties in terms of alignment with IOC's strategic direction.
- Targeted Dialogue: Targeted discussions with one or more Interested Parties (called Preferred Host(s)), as instructed by the IOC Executive Board.

=== Timeline ===
- 31 October 2026: Deadline for Interested Parties to be considered by the IOC
- November 2026: Virtual presentations by Interested Parties to the Future Host Commission
- March 2027: Deadline for the IOC's feasibility assessments and opening of Strategic Dialogue
- April 2027: Update to the IOC Session by Future Host Commission chair
- January 2028: Submission of initial files and core guarantees
- January/March 2028: Update to IOC Members by Future Host Commission chair
- April/September 2028: Future Host Commission site visits
- 10 - 13 July 2028: Reports to the IOC Session by Interested Parties
- December 2028: Future Host Commission report & Targeted Dialogue to be opened with a select number of Preferred Hosts
- December 2028: Update to IOC Members by Future Host Commission chair
- January/March 2029: Final submission with full guarantee file
- March/June 2029: IOC Members’ briefing & presentations to ASOIF and ANOC
- One month before IOC Session 2029: Future Host Commission final report
- Mid-2029: Presentation to IOC Session & host election & signing of the Host Contract

=== Confirmed bids ===
The following are parties that have been in continuous dialogue with the IOC, in the interest in hosting the 2036 Summer Olympics:

City	Country	National Olympic Committee	Status
Ahmedabad	India	Indian Olympic Association (IOA)	Interested party
India had previously expressed interest in hosting the 2032 Summer Olympics but later chose to bid for the 2036 Summer Olympics instead. In 2021, the Ahmedabad Urban Development Authority (AUDA) hired PwC as its consultant, which identified 22 sites in Ahmedabad and Gandhinagar with a potential to host the Olympics. A large sports complex named the Sardar Vallabhbhai Patel Sports Enclave is being built in Ahmedabad, which will include several multi-sport venues. Home Minister Amit Shah stated that the SVPSE will be developed to meet Olympic standards. In October 2021, Indian Olympic Association president Narinder Batra stated that the Narendra Modi Stadium in Ahmedabad could be the venue for the opening ceremony of the Games. In August 2023, Anurag Thakur, India's minister of sports, backed Ahmedabad to be the host city. India has also shown interest in bidding for the 2030 Summer Youth Olympics and the 2038 Asian Games. In October 2023, at the 141st IOC Session, Prime Minister Narendra Modi formally declared India's interest in bidding for the 2036 Olympics. If India's bid is approved, it would be the first time India will host the Olympic Games. The Mission Olympic Cell (MOC) of the Sports Authority of India has proposed including some native Indian sports in the 2036 Olympics, including yoga, kabaddi, and kho-kho, as well as other sports popular in India, such as chess, T20 cricket, and squash (the latter two will be featured at the 2028 Summer Olympics in Los Angeles). In September 2024, The New Indian Express reported that official bid committees had yet to be formed for the 2036 bid, and that there had been little to no support from the Indian Olympic Association for the bid. There are also concerns that despite venue plans being shown for Ahmedabad, no host city has been decided as of yet, with the IOC telling the newspaper that they had “not been informed by the IOA of any selected region”. During the Olympic Council of Asia’s General Assembly in September, India's Union Minister of Labour and Employment Mansukh Mandaviya said that “under the leadership of Prime Minister Narendra Modi we are going to bid for the 2030 Youth Olympics, but our focus remains on hosting the 2036 Olympics.” On 1 October 2024, the Indian Olympic Association officially submitted a letter of intent to the Future Host Commission. In December 2024, the Union Minister of State for Youth Affairs and Sports, Raksha Khadse, said that the Government of India is planning to improve and increase the number of sports facilities to Olympic-level standards across India. In that same month, World Athletics president and IOC president candidate, Sebastian Coe, said that India could bolster its bid by successfully hosting more international-level sporting events, as the Athletics Federation of India had submitted a bid for the 2028 World Athletics U20 Championships and other athletics events. In January 2025, a multi-city bid for India was proposed, with events held in the following cities: Ahmedabad (aquatics, athletics, basketball, shooting, tennis, urban sports, volleyball, and hosting the main Olympic Village), Bhubaneswar (field hockey, football), Bhopal (rowing), Mumbai (cricket, football), Pune (canoeing), and in March 2025, Goa (football, sailing) and the Taj Mahal in Agra (archery) would be added. This approach would fall in line with the Indian government's plan to increase sports engagement across the country. On 30 January 2025, Bhupendrabhai Patel, and members of the Athletics Federation of India, met with Commonwealth Games Federation vice-president Chris Jenkins in Gandhinagar to discuss a bid for the state of Gujarat to host the 2030 Commonwealth Games, which could be a potential stepping stone for the state to host the Olympics in the future. In March 2025, Ahmedabad municipal commissioner has proposed land acquisition of Asaram Bapu's ashram and surrounding areas in Motera, Ahmedabad for the 2036 Olympics. Earlier, Godhavi village farmers had protested against land acquisition, citing exploitation disguised as development. Such land acquisition frenzy has been criticized as against sustainability and inclusive principles of IOC. A report from The Times of India revealed a potential estimated budget for the Games if India was to host, which came up to ₹64,000 crore ($7.5 billion), while the 2030 Commonwealth Games bid expression of interest was submitted. India has made bids to host other major sporting events as part of its goal to host the Olympics; in November 2025, Ahmedabad was awarded the hosting rights for the 2030 Commonwealth Games. In May 2026, a bid was submitted for Ahmedabad to host the 2038 Asian Games. A letter of intent to host the 2036 Olympics was also submitted, with Indian officials promising better governance across its federations, improved anti-doping controls, and higher athlete performance in sporting events. In July 2025, an Indian delegation travelled to the IOC headquarters in Lausanne, Switzerland, and confirmed that Ahmedabad would be the host city for their bid. India has also bid for other international competitions before 2036. The bid has received support from the governments of Australia, New Zealand, and France.
Budapest	Hungary	Hungarian Olympic Committee (MOB)	Interested party
After hosting the 2022 World Aquatics Championships and the 2023 World Athletics Championships, Budapest is hoping these events will help them achieve a long-term goal of hosting the Summer Olympics. Budapest previously bid for the 2024 Summer Olympics, but withdrew after opposition parties and civil organizations have criticized the government's handling of the bid. The Games would eventually be awarded to Paris. In August 2024, the Mayor of Budapest, Gergely Karácsony, confirmed on RTL that he backed Budapest hosting the 2036 Olympics, but a bid would only be possible if the Prime Minister of Hungary increases the funding needed to bid for and host the Games, as it is being withheld by an opposing political party. In November 2024, the Curia of Hungary ruled that a referendum to determine whether Budapest should bid may be held, overturning a decision that was made by the General Assembly of Budapest. In October 2026, Magyar Nemzet reported that the most recent venue plan for the bid set by the Hungarian Olympic Committee would involve having several venues outside of Hungary, contrary to its 2024 bid only using venues in Hungary. Proposals involve holding surfing in Portugal, preliminary basketball and football games, rugby sevens and golf in Austria, and canoe slalom and preliminary football games in Slovakia.
Doha	Qatar	Qatar Olympic Committee (QOC)	Interested party
There are plans for Doha to host the 2036 Games, and there have been meetings with IOC President Thomas Bach. During these meetings, officials had claimed that 80 percent of the venues that would be required in Doha (and surrounding cities like Lusail and Al Rayyan) already exist, as well as the city boasting modern and capable transportation infrastructure. Doha previously bid for both the 2016 Summer Olympics and 2020 Summer Olympics, but was not shortlisted either time. The Games would be awarded to Rio de Janeiro and Tokyo, respectively. Qatar hosted the 2006 Asian Games, 2022 FIFA World Cup, the 2023 AFC Asian Cup, the 2024 World Aquatics Championships, and is scheduled to host the 2027 FIBA Basketball World Cup and the 2030 Asian Games. Towards the end of April 2024, Qatari newspaper Al-Watan reported that Qatari officials were preparing a comprehensive bid file. On 28 May 2024, Spanish sports website Relevo reported that despite Doha's bid not being confirmed, it was preferred among IOC members, while Qatari officials outlining the final plans for their bid, which, according to Relevo, is allegedly a preferred host. On 22 July 2025, a representative of the Qatar Olympic Committee said that it had participated in discussions with the IOC during the dialogue phase for interested bidders. In a press release, QOC president Sheikh Joaan bin Hamad Al Thani said the nation already has “95% of the required sports infrastructure in place to host the Games,” as well as “a comprehensive national plan to ensure 100% readiness of all facilities.” The 2022 FIFA World Cup took place under serious claims of corruption. Qatar was accused it bribed FIFA officials to win the hosting rights of the event. According to Amnesty International and other sources, human rights problems were common, especially for migrant workers, that faced unfair and dangerous working conditions, high recruitment fees, unpaid wages, and little help or compensation after the event ended. To this date, Qatar's laws against homosexuality and its harsh treatment of LGBTQ people still draw strong criticism. Same-sex acts can lead to imprisonment, and LGBTQ symbols were banned at World Cup venues. Even though Qatar promised tolerance, many human rights groups criticized the country for not protecting workers and LGBTQ rights during the tournament and afterwards. Due to high summer temperatures in Qatar, it is likely that the Olympics would have to be moved from their usual summer time slot if the bid is successful, similarly to the 2022 FIFA World Cup. On 4 June 2026, the Qatar Olympic Committee appointed Fatima Al Kuwari as CEO of the bid committee. In September 2026, the Arab League announced it would back Doha's bid.
Durban	South Africa	South African Sports Confederation and Olympic Committee (SASCOC)	Interested party
During the 2024 Summer Olympics, Mustapha Berraf, the president of the Association of National Olympic Committees of Africa, mentioned during a press conference that Cape Town was considering a bid for a future Summer Olympic Games, without specifying an edition. Cape Town previously bid for the 2004 Summer Olympics, losing to Athens. On 22 November 2024, the South African Sports Confederation and Olympic Committee president, Barry Hendricks, alongside CEO Nozipho Jafta and the Minister of Sports, Arts and Culture, Gayton McKenzie, met with the IOC's Future Host Commission to explore the potential opportunities and requirements for South Africa to host the 2036 Olympics. According to IOC President Thomas Bach, "Africa is on the rise and South Africa has the stability, the infrastructure [sic] and vision to stage an Olympics". On 2 December 2024, Hendricks confirmed that South Africa's Olympic bid would be launched at some point after February 2025. On 1 July 2025, Hendricks told SABC Sport that South Africa's campaign to host the 2036 Olympics had been paused. The committee would instead focusing on hosting smaller sporting events, such as the World Volleyball Championships, as a means to prepare a bid for the 2040 Olympics. The committee also revealed that it had been invited to bid for the 2030 Commonwealth Games. On 12 November 2025, the Cabinet of South Africa would approve the country's bid to host either in 2036 or 2040. Cabinet members said that they had entered into "continuous dialogue" with the International Olympic Committee (despite the process for future bids being on hold at that time), and that they were "confident of South Africa's readiness to host the Olympics given South Africa's available infrastructure". In March 2026, the South African Sports Confederation and Olympic Committee president, Barry Hendricks, said that the committee was preparing to submit bid documents bid to the IOC, and that the bid might involve Cape Town, Durban and Johannesburg. On 29 October 2026, the South African Sports Confederation and Olympic Committee announced that it preferred Durban to be the host city for the South African bid. The venue plan involves having between 60% to 70% of events in Durban, as well as hosting the Olympic Village and ceremonies. Johannesburg, Cape Town and other cities would host the rest of the events. The allocation of sports and selection of venues will depend on how the bid progresses in Strategic Dialogue. Around the same time, a report from Independent Online revealed a potential estimated budget for the Games if Durban was to host, which came up to R500 billion ($29.9 billion).
Istanbul	Turkey	Turkish National Olympic Committee (TMOK)	Interested party
On 8 June 2020, the vice-president of the Turkish National Olympic Committee, Hasan Arat said, "Istanbul should be a candidate city for the 2032 Summer Olympic Games". The mayor of Istanbul, Ekrem İmamoğlu, also stated: "We put forward our will, and in the name of Istanbul and Turkish people, we want to hold the Olympics and Paralympic Games in Istanbul". On 14 July 2021, a bid to host the 2036 Games was launched. On 3 April 2023, a meeting took place between President Recep Tayyip Erdoğan, Secretary of Youth and Sports Mehmet Kasapoğlu and IOC President Thomas Bach, regarding the Turkish bid. Istanbul hosted the 2025 European Para Youth Games, and will host the 2027 European Games as part of a long-term bid to host the 2036 Olympic and Paralympic Games. Istanbul bid unsuccessfully for the 2000, 2008 and 2020 Summer Olympics, which were awarded to Sydney, Beijing, and Tokyo, respectively. On 19 November 2024, the Turkish National Olympic Committee, the Ministry of Youth and Sports and the Municipal Council of Istanbul presented their vision for their bid to the International Olympic Committee during an online meeting.
Munich	Germany	German Olympic Sports Confederation (DOSB)	Interested party
In 2021, LSB president Thomas Härtel envisioned a campaign reminiscent of the 2006 FIFA World Cup and its motto, "Die Welt zu Gast bei Freunden" ("A time to make friends"), and proposed a joint bid of Berlin and Tel Aviv, considering that 2036 would mark 100 years since the 1936 Summer Olympics in Berlin. However, the idea to host the Games together with Israel has since been abandoned under German stakeholders preferring a sole-German bid. In Autumn 2023, the German Olympic Sports Confederation (DOSB) toured through several German cities to discuss a potential bid with the local population, because of the previously rejected Hamburg 2024 bid in a referendum. The Governing Mayor of Berlin, Kai Wegner, announced his support for the bid on 13 November 2023. On 24 July 2024, the Federal Cabinet announced that it would prefer to see Germany host the 2040 Summer Olympics, which would occur on the year of the 50th anniversary of the reunification of Germany. In May 2025, the DOSB started the bid process for cities to present their Olympic bid projects to host either in 2036, 2040 or 2044. After assessing the feasibility of the bids by September 2025, and results presented in December, they gave interested cities until June 2026 to promote their bids and hold any referendums. The final decision, as well as a selection of the hosting year, would be made on 26 September 2026, with "international competitiveness" and "cost-effectiveness of the submitted proposals" being the factors. On 1 June 2025, the DOSB confirmed four concepts that were submitted within the set deadline: Berlin (previously hosted in 1936, intends to co-host with Brandenburg, Mecklenburg-Vorpommern, Saxony and Schleswig-Holstein); Hamburg (previously bid for 2024); Munich (previously hosted in 1972); Rhine-Ruhr metropolitan region; Leipzig, who previously applied to bid for 2012, but was not selected for candidacy, did not submit its own application, but would contribute sports facilities to Berlin's bid. On 28 November 2025, member of the Bundestag Christiane Schenderlein, as well as Kim Bui and Michael Mronz, and DOSB president Thomas Weikert travelled to the IOC headquarters in Lausanne, Switzerland, and entered into continuous dialogue. Referendums took place across three of the four cities that were selected: On 26 October 2025, the referendum for Munich was held. Out of 305,201 residents, 66.4% voted ‘yes’, while 33.6% voted ‘no’.; On 19 April 2026, Rhine-Ruhr held its referendum. Out of an estimated 1.4 million residents in 17 partaking municipalities, 16 voted in favour. Votes for ‘yes’ averaged 66%, with some exceeding 70%. In addition, its proposed sailing host city Kiel had 63.5% of residents saying ‘yes’ in its own referendum.; On 31 May 2026, Hamburg held its referendum. Out of 651,730 residents, 45.08% voted ‘yes’, while 54.92% voted ‘no’. The vote was considered binding for the senate of Hamburg, and the bid was cancelled by local organisers.; Berlin was not required to hold a referendum, but a survey from Der Tagesspiegel was held towards the end of 2025, asking Berliners if they wanted Berlin to host the Olympics again. 27% of residents voted ‘yes’, 67% voted ‘no’, and 6% were ‘unsure’. Despite this, on 21 May 2026, the Berlin House of Representatives would approve Berlin's bid. Following the Berlin state election, the city formally withdrew its candidacy on 23 September 2026, citing a lack of support from the new ruling party, Die Linke. On 26 September 2026, Munich was selected as the host city for the German bid, with 91 votes over 50 votes for the Rhine-Ruhr metropolitan region.
North Jeolla Province	South Korea	Korean Sport & Olympic Committee (KSOC)	Interested party
In 2022, the Mayor of Seoul, Oh Se-hoon, said he was quietly pursuing his city to host the 2036 Olympics. He met with International Olympic Committee (IOC) president Thomas Bach at the IOC headquarters in Lausanne, Switzerland on 24 October 2022, and proposed Seoul's bid to host the Olympics. He also outlined the city's ongoing ₩2.1 trillion (US$1.46 billion) project to build a large-scale sports and entertainment complex (Jamsil Sports MICE Complex) in southeastern Seoul, saying the complex can be used as an instrumental facility for the 2036 Olympics. The Jamsil Sports MICE Complex would be built on the site of the Seoul Sports Complex, and include the existing Seoul Olympic Stadium, as well as a new baseball stadium, a new indoor arena, an underground swimming pool, a convention and exhibition center, and 3 hotels. Bach responded that Seoul appears to be prepared to host an Olympics, referring to his recent visit to Seoul and briefings he received on the project. If Seoul was selected, this would have been the second Summer Olympic Games to be hosted in Seoul, after the 1988 Summer Olympics. In December 2024, Oh Se-hoon confirmed that the Korean Institute of Sport Science had conducted a study on the bid's economic viability, which determined that the cost to benefit ratio reached a satisfactory 1.03. There had been early proposals for venues, such as Gwanghwamun Square hosting archery and Hangang Park hosting beach volleyball. Two neighbouring provinces were also confirmed to host some sports with Seoul if selected; Incheon and Gyeonggi Province. On 26 December, venue inspections began in Seoul. In November 2024, the Korean Sports and Olympic Committee set a deadline of November 12 for cities or regions to submit letters of intent, with the committee expected to select a candidate in February 2025. Cities included Seoul, Busan, Incheon, Gangwon and North Jeolla Province. The governor of North Jeolla Province, Kim Gwan-young, had proposed North Jeolla Province's bid, with original plans to use 22 existing venues (including a renovation of Jeonju World Cup Stadium to become an Olympic stadium) and constructing 11 temporary venues using wooden structures, with an expected budget of ₩10.3 trillion ($7.4 billion), with an economic return of ₩42 trillion ($30 billion). On 28 February 2025, a presentation was held to choose either Seoul or North Jeolla for the bid. The evaluation committee consisted of officials from numerous Korean national sport federations. North Jeolla would win 49–11 against Seoul. The North Jeolla bid also changed its bid plans with a larger emphasis on cost efficiency and regional development, with plans for events to be spread across the country's central and east; Daegu hosting athletics, Gwangju hosting archery and swimming, and Hongseong County hosting tennis. The bid requires approval from the Ministry of Culture, Sports and Tourism, and the Ministry of Economy and Finance before the Korean Sports and Olympic Committee can submit it to the International Olympic Committee. In October 2025, Yoon Jun-byung, a representative of the Democratic Party of Korea, criticised the "mess" over the bid on his social media accounts, pointing out that the province's bid was failing to meet the IOC's standards, and also pointed out the Ministry of Economy and Finance had not yet approved the bid. These claims have been denied by governor of North Jeolla Province, Kim Gwan-young, and the Ministry of Culture, Sports and Tourism. In addition, the presidential policy of Lee Jae Myung did not include the bid as part of the Korea Institute of Public Administration's national tasks in August, and a preliminary feasibility study for the bid that was supposed to have been held in September had not been released, potentially indicating that the bid had stalled. On 13 November 2025, officials of the government of North Jeolla Province announced that if their bid was successful, Seoul would host up to eight sports; athletics, gymnastics, handball, tennis, track cycling, volleyball, and basketball and football preliminaries. In addition, previously proposed cities in the central and east would have their plans changed; Daegu hosting shooting, and Gwangju hosting football preliminaries and baseball finals. Within North Jeolla Province, Jeonju would host the archery finals, 3x3 basketball, BMX cycling and skateboarding. On 5 January 2026, Lee Seung-hyun, current chairman of INPAC Korea and former leader of Samsung Electronics's TV division, launched a citizens’ committee to attain Seoul hosting the 2036 Olympics, which aims to garner support through a signature campaign, and form a bid promotion team using experts from various industry fields. Back in December 2025, he compiled data from the Seoul Metropolitan Government's original bid plans, and pointed out that North Jeolla Province's bid had several limitations, and emphasized Seoul's bid was more legitimate, though a higher potential surplus of ₩270 billion ($182 million), and a more optimized venue plan, with 28 out of 33 proposed venues existing. In September 2026, North Jeolla officials announced that it would no longer host alone, and would instead seek a co-hosting arrangement with Seoul. The decision was made after the Ministry of Culture, Sports and Tourism postponed its evaluation of the North Jeolla bid after Seoul Mayor Oh Se-hoon, in a meeting with the Governor of Jeonbuk State, Lee Won-taeg, demanded that most major events, including the ceremonies, be staged in Seoul. If there are significant changes to the bid, the Korean Sport & Olympic Committee has considered restarting the bid process, or abandoning the bid altogether. In October 2026, the Korean Sport & Olympic Committee said they had not approved a Seoul-North Jeolla joint bid, saying that "the official host candidate city is Jeonju [North Jeolla], and an agreement between Seoul and North Jeolla alone does not change the status of the candidate city or the hosting plan." On 16 November 2026, talks between North Jeolla and Seoul fell through, and thus will continue their bid independently.

=== Previous potential bids ===
==== Africa ====
As of 2026, the Olympic Games have never been staged in Africa, the only continent except Antarctica to hold this distinction.

City	Country	National Olympic Committee
The New Capital	Egypt	Egyptian Olympic Committee (EOC)
Egypt has expressed interest in hosting the 2036 Summer Olympics in The New Capital, which has a multi-million dollar sports complex called the Egypt International Olympic City, 45 kilometers east of Cairo. In January 2022, the Egyptian Minister of Youth and Sports, Ashraf Sobhy, revealed the country's plans to bid for the games and potentially seek to become the first nation in Africa to host the Olympic Games. Cairo had previously bid for the 2008 Summer Olympics and was not shortlisted, with the Games eventually going to Beijing, China. The project features a 93,940-seat stadium, an Olympic-sized swimming pool, tennis courts and two indoor venues. In April 2024, BBC Sport reported that Egypt was preparing to table a proposal to the International Olympic Committee. The Egyptian Olympic Committee is hoping that the success of their athletes at the 2024 Summer Olympics would help bolster Egypt's resume, which would benefit their bid should they launch it. During the 2024 Summer Olympics, Mustapha Berraf, the head of the Association of National Olympic Committees of Africa, announced during a press conference that Egypt was also bidding for the 2040 Summer Olympics.

==== Asia ====
City	Country	National Olympic Committee
Riyadh	Saudi Arabia	Saudi Olympic and Paralympic Committee (SOPC)
With Saudi Arabia set to host the 2034 FIFA World Cup and the 2034 Asian Games, as well as investing in LIV Golf, the Esports World Cup and the Saudi Pro League, along with plans to build a new Formula One track in Qiddiya City, Saudi sport stakeholders have been considering on a bid to host the Olympics as early as 2036. Saudi Arabia has denied allegations that hosting the 2036 Olympics would allow the country to continue its sportswashing campaign to direct attention away from their poor human rights records and corruption scandals.
Guangdong, Hong Kong and Macau (Greater Bay Area)	China, Hong Kong and Macau	Chinese Olympic Committee (COC), Sports Federation and Olympic Committee of Hong Kong, China (SF&OCHKC) and Sports and Olympic Committee of Macau, China (MOC)
Around the time when bidding was paused for the 2036 Olympics in June 2025 by new IOC president Kirsty Coventry, a working group named "2036 Working Group", composed of business leaders and sports officials in Guangdong, Hong Kong and Macau, have been building support for a bid to host the Olympics in the Guangdong–Hong Kong–Macao Greater Bay Area behind closed doors. Business chambers in the regions have reacted positively to the proposal, while figures in local sporting bodies had given it consideration. The group proposes a decentralized model, with venues spread across the three host regions, similar to the 2026 Winter Olympics, which comprised venues throughout Northern Italy. The group has also said that any further progress for the proposal will be determined based on the success of Guangdong, Hong Kong and Macau jointly hosting the 2025 National Games of China in November.

==== Europe ====
City	Country	National Olympic Committee
Northern Italy or Rome (potentially with Milan and Venice)	Italy	Italian National Olympic Committee (CONI)
In July 2021, the mayors of Florence and Bologna, Dario Nardella and Virginio Merola respectively, and the presidents of Tuscany and Emilia Romagna, Eugenio Giani and Stefano Bonaccini respectively, expressed interest to present a bid for the 2036 Summer Olympics. In July 2022, Turin City Council committed to the mayor supporting the application in front of the Piedmontese and Italian governments. Turin previously hosted the 2006 Winter Olympics. In August 2025, Minister for Sport and Youth Andrea Abodi announced he was confident in the possibility of Rome bidding for the 2036 or 2040 Olympics, especially after the country hosts the 2026 Winter Olympics in Milan and Cortina d'Ampezzo. Rome previously hosted the 1960 Summer Olympics, and bid for 2020 and 2024, but both bids were withdrawn due to a lack of support from the government and general public. The Games would be awarded to Tokyo and Paris, respectively. In February 2026, the former president of Veneto, Luca Zaia, proposed a bid involving sites in Northern Italy, including Lombardy, Veneto and Venice. Despite this, Italian Prime Minister Giorgia Meloni did not confirm any plans to bid for the 2036 or 2040 Olympics at that time. In March 2026, after the successful hosting of the 2026 Winter Olympics, it was reported that the Italian National Olympic Committee were eyeing a future bid for the Summer Olympics, and cities such as the capital, Rome, had expressed interest. The president of the Italian National Olympic Committee, Luciano Buonfiglio, said that his country "deserves another Summer Olympics", but would take the bid process "step by step", by ensuring that the Government of Italy approves the bid before further progress. The president of the International Bobsleigh and Skeleton Federation and IOC member, Ivo Ferriani, suggested that a decentralized model, such as events being held in Rome, Milan and Venice, would be "the key to the country's next bid", after the model used when Italy hosted the 2026 Winter Olympics was successfully pulled off. On 14 April 2026, the mayors of Genoa, Milan and Turin, respectively Silvia Salis, Giuseppe Sala and Stefano Lo Russo, announced they were exploring a joint bid between Liguria, Lombardy and Piedmont, each having strong economic, cultural and logistical links to one another. The presidents of these regions; Marco Bucci, Attilio Fontana and Alberto Cirio have also joined meeting between the city mayors to discuss this proposal, dubbed the "Olympic Triangle" due to the positioning of the cities.
Copenhagen	Denmark	National Olympic Committee and Sports Confederation of Denmark (DIF)
Mia Nyegaard, mayor of the Culture and Leisure Committee of the Copenhagen City Council, considered a small-budget Olympics with minimal investment and using the facilities that the area has to offer. She stated that the plan would involve building a temporary Olympic Stadium and either the development of an athletes’ village that could later be converted to student and family housing, or using cruise ships in the Port of Copenhagen as the athletes’ village (which is similar to a passenger-cargo ship being used to house surfing athletes in Tahiti during the 2024 Summer Olympics). In September 2024, the Copenhagen City Council would budget 500,000 kroner to explore a 2036 Olympic bid, and the funds will also be used to submit a bid for the 2030 Summer Youth Olympics.

==== North America ====
City	Country	National Olympic Committee
Toronto and Montreal	Canada	Canadian Olympic Committee (COC)
On 3 February 2021, Le Journal de Montréal reported that the Canadian Olympic Committee was exploring the possibility of a joint Montreal–Toronto bid for either the 2032 or 2036 Summer Olympics. Potential venues include those used for the 1976 Summer Olympics in Montreal, and the 2015 Pan American Games in Toronto. Toronto previously bid for the 2008 Summer Olympics, losing to Beijing. It has also been suggested that Canada bid for the 2038 Winter Olympics.

=== Cancelled, suspended, or rejected bids ===
==== Asia ====
City	Country	National Olympic Committee
Chengdu and Chongqing	China	Chinese Olympic Committee (COC)
China launched a proposal for a joint bid involving Chengdu and Chongqing for the 2032 or the 2036 Summer Olympics. In March 2018, Pu Hu, a member of the CPPCC Chengdu Committee, submitted a proposal for Chengdu to bid for the 2036 Olympic Games. Chengdu hosted the 2021 Summer World University Games and the 2025 World Games. There has been no news regarding the bid since, but a member of the Chengdu Municipal People's Congress had allegedly clarified that they will not submit a bid.
Nusantara	Indonesia	Indonesian Olympic Committee (KOI)
On 1 July 2021, the Committee chief of the Indonesian Olympic Committee announced that Indonesia would bid for the 2036 Summer Olympics after they failed to secure the 2032 edition, which was awarded to Brisbane. The Committee chief Raja Sapta Oktohari said, "We will not back down and will continue to fight for the 2036 Olympics", promising more solid preparation. Indonesia previously hosted the 2018 Asian Games in Jakarta and Palembang. On 3 August 2022, President Joko Widodo announced plans to hold the 2036 Olympics in Nusantara, the new capital city of Indonesia. Jokowi later reaffirmed his country's efforts in November of the same year. On 16 November 2022, he confirmed that they would bid with the new capital Nusantara, which is under construction. On 30 March 2024, while speaking with Antara, the Indonesian Olympic Committee president, Raja Sapta Oktohari, stated that the committee is still engaged in dialogue with the IOC, and that an observing delegation would visit the 2024 Summer Olympics in Paris, and additionally monitor the preparations of the 2028 Summer Olympics organizing committee. In October 2024, it was reported that the Minister of Youth and Sports, Dito Ariotedjo, claimed that Indonesia had received an offer to host the 2036 Olympics and the Youth Olympic Games. According to the minister, the offer came directly from IOC President Thomas Bach. Dito said he has explored the possibility of Indonesia hosting the Olympics and concluded that the country is capable of being a host of international sports events. Aside from Nusantara, "some of the options are Jakarta and Bali, as well as Jakabaring (Palembang, South Sumatra) and Medan (North Sumatra). The sports venues are spread across Indonesia, and I believe we are capable of hosting the Olympics, as long as we’re serious (in preparation),” he said. In March 2025, the Indonesian Olympic Committee entered the bidding process to host the 2030 Summer Youth Olympics, which could be a potential stepping stone for the country to host the Olympics in the future. On 22 October 2025, the IOC announced that they would end dialogue with the Indonesian Olympic Committee regarding bidding for the 2030 Summer Youth Olympics, 2036 Summer Olympics or any future Games after Indonesia denied the visas of Israeli athletes competing in the 2025 World Artistic Gymnastics Championships in Jakarta. The IOC further stated that this would continue until the Indonesian government provided them with "adequate guarantees that it will allow access to the country for all participants, regardless of nationality, to attend". As such, the Nusantara bid has effectively been suspended for the time being.

==== Europe ====
City	Country	National Olympic Committee
Madrid	Spain	Spanish Olympic Committee (COE)
After multiple unsuccessful bids for the Summer Olympics, Spain had originally planned to bid for the 2036 Olympics, but later shifted its focus to restructure the bid criteria potentially for the 2040 Olympics or beyond. Spanish Olympic Committee President Alejandro Blanco stated, "I have had several meetings with the Mayor of Madrid talking about this issue and Madrid, without a doubt, is a city that should try to host the Olympic Games, but it will not opt for the 2036 Games." In 2023, the president of the Community of Madrid, Isabel Díaz Ayuso, suggested that her city could be back on track. But the IOC Executive Board's secrecy policy about the current bid parties list, made it unclear who was right on the destiny of the Madrid bid. To date, the only Olympic Games celebrated in the country were the 1992 Summer Olympics, which were held in Barcelona. Madrid had previously bid for the 1972, 2012, 2016, and the 2020 Games. They were awarded to Munich, London, Rio de Janeiro and Tokyo, respectively.
Odesa	Ukraine	National Olympic Committee of Ukraine (NOCU)
Businessman and politician Borys Kolesnikov helped oversee Ukraine's co-hosting of the UEFA Euro 2012 with Poland after being appointed as First Deputy Prime Minister in 2010, and is the leader of the political party Ukraine is Our Home, created in early 2021. In September 2021, he was quoted as expecting the 2036 Summer Olympic Games to generate income and development for the city's local economy and tourism. Following the Russian invasion of Ukraine, Odesa and its surrounding region have been the target of frequent shelling and air strikes by Russian forces, damaging infrastructure and residential buildings.
London	Great Britain	British Olympic Association (BOA)
In February 2019, the Mayor of London, Sadiq Khan, announced the possibility of London hosting either the 2032 or 2036 Summer Olympics. The mayor remarked that 2032 "was not out of the question", but that a 2036 bid was more likely. London had hosted the Summer Olympics in 1908, 1948, and 2012. In the end, London did not submit a bid for 2032. In July 2022, Khan said he and his office were working on plans to bring the Olympics back to London in 2036 in what would be the "greenest Games ever". In a January 2023 interview, the Mayor stated London would not submit a bid for 2036, and would instead explore the option of hosting the Games in 2040.
Poland (host city not decided)		Polish Olympic Committee (PKOI)
In July 2023, on TVP Sport, the Polish Minister of Sport and Tourism, Kamil Bortniczuk, spoke about his feelings about the third European Games held in Kraków and the possibility of organizing the Olympic Games. He said that Poland has made a huge step forward and is ready to host the Games in 2036, 2040, or 2044, without yet indicating which city would apply for it. Announced in Zakopane by President Andrzej Duda, Prime Minister Mateusz Morawiecki, Minister of Sport and Tourism, Kamil Bortniczuk on 26 September 2023, during the European Sport and Tourism Congress. After the 3rd European Games in Kraków, the Polish government expressed interest in submitting an application for the Games in 2036 or 2044, with Warsaw being the city likely to be chosen. Following the 2023 Polish parliamentary election won by the Civic Coalition led by Prime Minister Donald Tusk, on 5 January 2024, the Polish Minister of Sport and Tourism Slawomir Nitras announced that the country was not ready to further pursue its bid to host the 2036 Olympic and Paralympic Games. When speaking to the Polish Press Agency, he said that "it would be necessary to make a bid and participate in a competition with other countries. Poland is not ready for that today." During a conference in Karczew in August 2024, Tusk said that Poland would focus on bidding for the 2040 or 2044 Olympics, as based on IOC's preliminary assessment that would be more viable.
Barcelona	Spain	Spanish Olympic Committee (COE)
On 8 October 2024, the sports councilor of Barcelona, David Escudé, announced that his city was open to a bid for the Olympic Games in 2036, 2040 or 2044. He said that Barcelona sports are an "intangible part of city pride". Barcelona had previously hosted the 1992 Summer Olympics. At the end of October 2024, the City Council of Barcelona rejected a potential bid. The decision was a direct result of local anti-tourism protests.
Several cities (Note: Kazan, Novosibirsk, Perm, Rostov-on-Don, Saint Petersburg, Sochi, Ufa, Volgograd, and/or Vladivostok)	Russia	Russian Olympic Committee (ROC)
Despite being banned from bidding for the 2032 Games due to the state-sponsored doping scandal, there were proposals sent to the Minister of Foreign Affairs, Sergey Lavrov, on several Russian cities bidding solely or jointly for the 2036 Olympics once the doping-related sanctions were lifted, such as Kazan, Saint Petersburg, Vladivostok, Novosibirsk, Perm, Rostov-on-Don, Sochi and Ufa. However, following the country's invasion of Ukraine starting in 2022, the IOC has barred any sporting events from being held in Russia or Belarus, and further in 2023, the IOC Executive Board suspended the Russian Olympic Committee's membership, hence revoking any right-of-bids for any Russian cities. Despite this, president of the Russian Olympic Committee and Minister of Sport, Mikhail Degtyarev, is still planning to submit candidacies for future Summer and Winter Olympics.
Northern England	Great Britain	British Olympic Association (BOA)
On 9 February 2026, a consortium of 11 Northern regional representatives, including then-Mayor of Greater Manchester Andy Burnham, wrote to Lisa Nandy, the Secretary of State for Culture, Media and Sport, proposing a project tentatively titled The Great North, in which they outlined their urge for any future British Olympic bid to be hosted in the North of England, citing the need for a "fairer redistribution of major events across the country". Oliver Coppard, the Mayor of South Yorkshire, told BBC Radio Sheffield that the group were aiming for a 2036 bid and listed areas such as Sheffield, Manchester, Rotherham, Doncaster, Barnsley and Liverpool as potential venues, stating that "a huge amount of investment" would flow into the historically deprived region as a result. The idea of a pan-Northern bid had been previously proposed by the Heseltine Institute who, in 2025, noted the IOC's increasing support for multi-city bids. In a statement, the Department of Culture, Media and Sport said that any future decision would be down to the British Olympic Association rather than the government. The proposed bid was criticised by Mayor of London Sadiq Khan, who stated that any British bid which does not use "all the assets we have" across the country, including venues and facilities outside of the North, would be a "missed opportunity". In May 2026, the UK Government would commission UK Sport to conduct an "initial strategic assessment" study for a Northern England bid, including potential cost, economic benefits and a bid's chance of success. The aim is now to host within the 2040s.

==== North America ====
City	Country	National Olympic Committee
Mexico City, Guadalajara, Monterrey and/or Tijuana	Mexico	Mexican Olympic Committee (COM)
Carlos Padilla, president of the Mexican Olympic Committee, believes that Guadalajara is one of the four Mexican cities (next to Mexico City, Tijuana and Monterrey) that could attempt to host an Olympic Games after 2026. In an interview with ESPN, the director said that those four cities "have everything" to seek to be hosts, but not immediately. Guadalajara hosted the 2011 Pan American Games and the 2023 Gay Games along with Hong Kong. Marcelo Ebrard, the Mexican Secretary of Foreign Affairs, stated on social media that if a bid is authorised by President Andrés Manuel López Obrador, Mexico City will seek to host the 2036 or 2040 Olympic Games. The city last hosted the Summer Olympics in 1968. On 26 October 2022, the Foreign Affairs Secretary of Mexico, Marcelo Ebrard, alongside the President of the Mexican Olympic Committee, Maria Jose Alcala, announced that Mexico City would be officially bidding to host the games in 2036. On 25 March 2023, the Mexican Secretary of Foreign Affairs, Marcelo Ebrard and the President of the Mexican Olympic Committee, María José Alcalá, handed over an official letter of intent to IOC President Thomas Bach. Mexico's candidacy marks the 100th anniversary of the founding of Mexican Olympism, as part of the International Olympic Movement. On 16 January 2024, Mexico withdrew their bid, citing tough competition. They expressed interest in bidding for future Pan American Games and Youth Olympic Games, which they believe they will have a better chance at hosting.

==== South America ====
City	Country	National Olympic Committee
Santiago	Chile	Chilean Olympic Committee (COCh)
During the 2023 Pan American Games, IOC president Thomas Bach suggested that the Chilean Olympic Committee consider bidding for the Olympics in the future after praising the Games' organization. Once the Games closed, the president of the organizing committee Harold Mayne-Nichols confirmed the intentions to evaluate a potential bid for 2036. President Gabriel Boric supported the idea, saying that while a bid it is something that has to be studied carefully, Chile "has the right to dream bigger". In addition, several members of the Chamber of Deputies has asked President Boric to take steps to register a formal bid. In May 2024, an interview with Harold Mayne-Nicholls, CEO of the 2023 Pan American Games Organizing Committee, said that Santiago was actively working towards a bid to host the 2036 Summer Olympics. He said that the country's Minister of Sports, Jaime Pizarro, and the Chilean Olympic Committee, were discussing the feasibility with the IOC. Pizarro also highlighted that Santiago's infrastructure was "in excellent condition." He also pointed out any necessary works that would be needed, such as extending the Santiago Metro to the international airport, building more new and sufficient venues, as well as a need to increase the capacity and technologies of existing venues to meet IOC requirements. An idea of events on Easter Island and a preference to hold their games in October (which would mark the first Olympics since 2000 to be held outside the traditional summer window) to avoid the colder Southern Hemisphere winter, was also discussed. In June 2024, Boric confirmed during his annual State of the Nation speech that Chile would offer a bid for the 2036 Olympic Games to be in Santiago, giving a green light to the Ministry of Sports to start the process. In October 2024, in a Panam Sports General Assembly held in Asunción, Paraguay, IOC president Thomas Bach, Minister of Sports Jaime Pizarro, and Chilean Olympic Committee president Miguel Ángel Mujica held a discussion regarding Santiago's bid. In an interview with EFE, Jaime Pizarro said that "leveraging all the experience gained from the 2023 Pan American and Parapan American Games, we participated in continuous dialogues about all the preliminary processes, and the decision will be made before Los Angeles 2028." He shared a proposal for the venue plan, which could involve venues being decentralized across the country, such as Pichilemu hosting surfing, Viña del Mar hosting the triathlon, and San Pedro de la Paz hosting rowing and canoeing. It is also expected that experience will be gained, and potential will be shown, from Chile hosting the 2025 Youth Parapan American Games, the 2025 FIFA U-20 World Cup, the 2025 UCI Track Cycling World Championships, the 2025 FIBA Women's AmeriCup, and the 2027 Special Olympics World Summer Games, which will mark the first time in the Special Olympics’s 55-year history that a World Games will take place in the Southern Hemisphere. On 21 April 2025, the Chilean Minister of Sports Jaime Pizarro announced that the government had sent an official letter to the president of the Chilean Olympic Committee and the International Olympic Committee to apply to host the 2030 Summer Youth Olympics, which could be a potential stepping stone for the city to host the Olympics in the future. On October 6, 2026, it was confirmed that Santiago, Chile, would withdraw its bid for the 2036 Olympic Games to focus on their bid for the 2030 Summer Youth Olympics.

== Broadcasting rights ==
On 13 March 2025, Comcast/NBCUniversal announced that it had renewed its long-running rights to the Olympic Games in the United States through 2036, under an agreement valued at US$3 billion. Aside from the extension, Comcast will be partnering with the IOC on providing the Olympic Broadcasting Services with support for in-venue distribution as well as collaboration with the IOC on digital advertising opportunities.

Summer Olympics
Preceded by Brisbane	Summer Olympic Games; To be determined XXXVI Olympiad (2036)	Succeeded by To be determined
