= Badminton Association of Thailand =

Thailand's governing body for badminton

Badminton Association of Thailand สมาคมกีฬาแบดมินตันแห่งประเทศไทย
- Abbreviation: BAT
- Formation: 1950
- Type: National Sport Association
- Headquarters: Pathum Wan District, Bangkok
- President: Khunying Patama Leeswadtrakul
- Affiliations: BAC, BWF
- Website: badmintonthai.or.th

Badminton Association of Thailand (BAT, Thai: สมาคมกีฬาแบดมินตันแห่งประเทศไทย), officially known as Badminton Association of Thailand Under Royal Patronage of His Majesty the King (Thai: สมาคมกีฬาแบดมินตันแห่งประเทศไทย ในพระบรมราชูปถัมภ์) is the national governing body for the sport of badminton in Thailand. As of January 2019, there are 52 affiliated clubs and 304 associate member clubs across the country.

== History ==
The association was founded by four badminton enthusiasts in Thailand in 1950 and joined the International Badminton Federation a year later. It was awarded royal patronage in 1954 by King Bhumibol Adulyadej, who was also an avid badminton player. Long time support and contributions from the king was honored by Badminton World Federation in 2012 when former president Kang Young Joong awarded BWF President's Medal to the king.

== List of presidents ==
The following is the list of presidents of the association since 1950.

No.	Name
1	Phraya Jindarak
2	Luean Buasuwan
3	Chulin Lamsam
4	Taksak Yomnak
5	Prasert Rujirawong
6	Wichitra Tanarat
7	Chamnan Yuwaboon
8	Phichai Kulavanit
9	Chumpol Lohachala
10	Tienchai Sirisamphan
11	Korn Dabbaransi
12	Charoen Wattanasin
13	Patama Leeswadtrakul (Incumbent)

== Tournaments ==
- Thailand Open, an annual open tournament that attracts the world's elite players.
- Princess Sirivannavari Thailand Masters, a new tournament created in 2016 to honor Princess Sirivannavari Nariratana who is an ex-badminton player herself.
