= 2031 Pan American Games =

2031 edition of the Pan American Games

- Bid logo for the 2031 Pan American Games
- Host: Asunción, Paraguay
- Nations: 41

The 2031 Pan American Games (Spanish: Juegos Panamericanos de 2031), officially the XXI Pan American Games (Spanish: XXI Juegos Panamericanos) and commonly known as Asunción 2031, is an upcoming international multi-sport event governed by the Panam Sports Organization, to be held in Asunción, Paraguay. It will be the first Pan American Games to be held in Paraguay, and the tenth to be held in South America.

== Bidding process ==
Two bids met the 30 April 2025 deadline. Initially, the bidding process to determine the host of the 2031 Pan American Games would be held from 5–7 August 2025 during a PanAm Sports General Assembly in Asunción, a few days before the start of the 2025 Junior Pan American Games in the same city. However, due to the Paraguayan candidacy coinciding with the Junior Games in the same city, it was postponed to 10 October, in Santiago, Chile.

=== Host city election ===
On 10 October 2025, the winner was announced as Asunción, Paraguay.

Bidding results
City	NOC name	Votes
Asunción	Paraguay	28
Rio-Niterói	Brazil	24

=== Confirmed candidates ===
- Asunción, Paraguay (with surfing in El Salvador)
Asunción hosted the 2025 Junior Pan American Games and was the runner-up during the second selection of the 2027 Pan American Games, in which Lima, Peru eventually won. The city officially launched their candidacy on 26 December 2024. If their bid was successful, it would have been the first time that Paraguay hosts the main Pan American Games. As Paraguay is a landlocked country, the surfing events were proposed to be held in El Salvador, as confirmed by the El Salvador Olympic Committee, which would make it the first continental Central American country to host any Pan American Games event. An article by The Sports Examiner suggested that Asunción could bid for and host the 2031 Pan American Games "without delay" after making a "forceful and memorable" case to host the 2027 Pan American Games. A letter of guarantee was signed on 30 January 2025, around the same time the Paraguayan Olympic Committee expressed interest in bidding for the 2030 Summer Youth Olympics. Their strongest point for their bid is a consolidated and stable institutional political support, both from the country's president Santiago Peña — who remains on office during preparation of the Games — and from Paraguayan Olympic Committee president and IOC member Camilo López, who has an influence in Panam Sports, occupying a prominent position as second vice president, increasing the visibility and legitimacy of the Paraguayan proposal.

From 29 September to 1 October 2025, an evaluation commission from the Pan American Sports Organization visited Asunción, not long after the city successfully hosted the 2025 Junior Pan American Games. Bid organizers have expressed plans to build a new athletics stadium and indoor arena at the Parque Olímpico, and improve the city's transportation links, including expanding the Silvio Pettirossi International Airport to meet expected demand.

- Rio de Janeiro and Niterói, Brazil
Both cities launched a joint application, with Rio as the main host, and Niterói co-hosting some events, sent to the Brazilian Olympic Committee on 3 December 2024. The bid is idealized by the current vice-mayor of Niterói, Beijing 2008 bronze medalist sailing athlete Isabel Swan, who is also president of the Panam Sports Athletes Commission. Rio de Janeiro previously hosted the 2007 Pan American Games and the 2016 Summer Olympics. The potential estimated budget for the Games is R$3.7 billion (US$667 million). This project's proposal was to reuse as much as possible the facilities left as a legacy from both previous games, in addition to existing and some new facilities in the neighboring city (part of them already in construction regardless of the games). The bid has also proposed the construction of the new Pan American Village in the Central region of Rio — on the surroundings of the former Leopoldina railway terminal station, as part of the Porto Maravilha revitalization project — ensuring athletes' proximity to all venues in both cities. If their bid was successful, Rio would have been the fourth city to host the Games twice, after Winnipeg, Canada, Mexico City, Mexico, and Lima, Peru. It would have also been the first time Niterói hosted an international multi-sport event; and it would have also make Brazil the third country after Mexico and Canada to host the Games thrice. Once São Paulo withdrew their bid, the cities' application to officially become the Brazilian bid was confirmed during a COB assembly in 29 January 2025. According to Guilherme Schleder, the bid’s committee coordinator, they intend to talk to the Paraguayan bid to reach an agreement and guarantee the event in Brazil in 2031, leaving it to the neighboring country to organize the following one, in 2035.

From 1 to 3 October 2025, an evaluation commission from the Pan American Sports Organization visited Rio de Janeiro and Niterói. Bid organizers have expressed the possibility of hosting the medal ceremonies on the Copacabana Beach.

=== Interested cities ===
- Winnipeg, Canada
Winnipeg previously hosted the 1967 and 1999 Pan American Games. The Winnipeg City Council was said to be exploring a bid for the 2031 Pan American Games as of November 2021.

=== Withdrawn bids ===
- São Paulo, Brazil
The city officially launched their bid for the 2031 edition in Santiago, Chile, a day before their 2023 Pan American Games began. São Paulo previously hosted the 1963 Pan American Games. But the city began to have internal competition within the Brazilian Olympic Committee, with the joint candidacy of Rio and Niterói, in November 2024. The entity had until 31 January 2025 to present the chosen application to be the Brazilian bid for Panam Sports. However, São Paulo withdrawn their bid in 16 January 2025 and showed support for the Rio-Niterói candidacy

== The Games ==
=== Participating National Olympic Committees ===
All 41 nations of the Pan American Sports Organization are expected to compete.

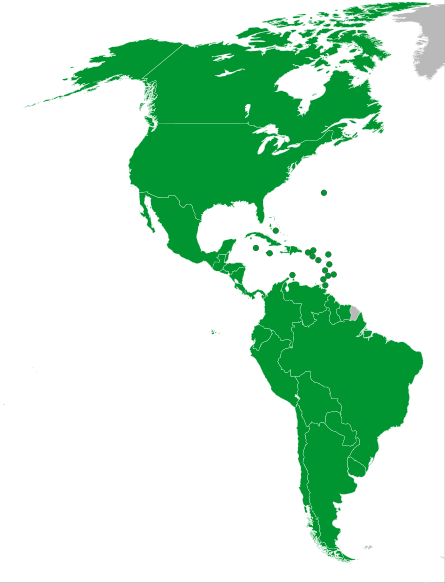
A map of all 41 participating nations

Participating National Olympic Committees
- Antigua and Barbuda
- Argentina
- Aruba
- Bahamas
- Barbados
- Belize
- Bermuda
- Bolivia
- Brazil
- British Virgin Islands
- Canada
- Cayman Islands
- Chile
- Colombia
- Costa Rica
- Cuba
- Dominica
- Dominican Republic
- Ecuador
- El Salvador
- Grenada
- Guatemala
- Guyana
- Haiti
- Honduras
- Jamaica
- Mexico
- Nicaragua
- Panama
- Paraguay (host)
- Peru
- Puerto Rico
- Saint Lucia
- Saint Kitts and Nevis
- Saint Vincent and the Grenadines
- Suriname
- Trinidad and Tobago
- United States
- Uruguay
- Venezuela
- Virgin Islands

Preceded by Lima	XXI Pan American Games; Asunción (2031)	Succeeded by TBD
