= Bids for the 2010 Summer Youth Olympics =

Overview
- Games of the I Youth Olympiad
- Winner: Singapore; Runner-up: Moscow; Shortlist: Athens · Bangkok · Turin

Details
- Committee: IOC
- Election venue: Lausanne

Map of the bidding cities

Important dates
- Bid: 26 October 2007
- Shortlist: 19 November 2007
- Decision: 21 February 2008

Decision
- Winner: Singapore (53 votes)
- Runner-up: Moscow (44 votes)

The bidding for the 2010 Youth Olympics Games began in August 2007, to which nine cities presented their candidature files. In the competition to host the inaugural Youth Olympic Games in 2010, the list was shortened to five in November 2007. The list was further shortened to two in January 2008—Moscow and Singapore.

Moscow was the highest rated city in the evaluation report, but may have been disadvantaged due to the win by Russian city Sochi to host the 2014 Winter Olympics. Singapore also had a very high evaluation and had a possible geographical advantage, being situated in a region (Southeast Asia) which had never hosted.

Singapore was announced as the host city on 21 February 2008 after a tally of a postal vote.

== Process ==
Cities interested in hosting the games had to have their applications confirmed by their respective National Olympic Committees and submitted to the International Olympic Committee (IOC) by August 31, 2007. On September 3, nine cities were confirmed as official applicants by the committee. They were later acknowledged as completing the questionnaire due October 26, 2007. A shortlist of five cities was announced on November 19.

Although it was planned to have an evaluation committee visit the shortlisted cities in December, eventually each city presented a video conference on December 13. As the IOC predicted, they further eliminated some of the cities before the final stage.

The IOC has stressed that the main goal of these games is not competition, but education based on Olympic values. The host city, therefore, should not have to build new venues for the occasion, but rather use existing infrastructure for the games. Still, the games would include an Olympic village and protocols which would prepare young athletes for future Olympic competition.

The risks of quickly preparing for the first edition of the event was a major factor in selection of the final candidates. There will only be two-and-a-half years to organize the Games, but Games with longer lead times may allow some of the non-selected cities to bid for future Games.

An evaluation committee viewed a video conference presentation from each city in December 2007. In January, the short list was reduced from five to two, Moscow and Singapore.

When the result of the final postal tally was revealed, Singapore won the right to host the Games over Moscow in a tally of 53–44.

2010 Youth Olympic Games bidding results
City	NOC Name	Postal votes
Singapore	Singapore	53
Moscow	Russia	44

== Overview of host bid ==
2010 Host City
Name	Country (IOC country code)	Official web site
Singapore	Singapore (SIN)	
Main article: Singapore bid for the 2010 Summer Youth Olympics Host of the 117th IOC Session, Singapore made its first formal bid to host a multi-disciplinary sporting event of this magnitude, bigger than its hostings of the Southeast Asian Games in 1973, 1983 and 1993. Banking on its high connectivity with the world, its youthfulness as an independent country and its reputation for excellence and multi-racial harmony, the city-state rolled out a high-publicity campaign. These included being amongst the first to launch its official website, bid logo (despite IOC rules against bid logos) and a bid tagline "Blazing the Trail" on 16 October 2007 and getting the local populace to support its bid, including an effort by students to collect 1 million signatures in support of the games. Singapore's bid got off to a rocky start when Prime Minister Lee Hsien Loong expressed concern on 15 July 2007 that the city may not be ready to host the games as the Singapore Sports Hub is expected to be ready only in 2011. By August, however, the city announced its intentions to proceed with the bid. Parliamentary Secretary for Community Development, Youth and Sports Teo Ser Luck went to study Beijing in September, and by October, Prime Minister Lee expressed full support. Singapore intends to put up "fully integrated sport, education and cultural programmes" as part of the Games, with emphasis on "compactness" and "vibrancy". All 26 sports will be featured, utilising 24 venues around the city. Suburban facilities such as the Bishan Stadium (for athletics), the Singapore Sports School (Modern Pentathlon), Tampines Bike Park (cycling) and the Toa Payoh Swimming Complex (aquatics and diving) were highlighted as a means of bringing the event to the people. The Youth Olympic Village will be located at the new student residential village of the National University of Singapore, slated for completion months before the event on the former Warren Golf Course. Amongst other educational plans, the bid includes a proposal to build a Sports Museum and Library and the offer of six Singapore Olympic Scholarships annually for young athletes to attend the Singapore Sports School. In the IOC evaluation, concerns were still expressed over the building two new venues - the Olympic Village and equestrian complex. However, a construction expert found that the $423 million University of Singapore Olympic Village plan was feasible, and a backup plan should they not be finished was also feasible. The equestrian venue was also expected to be built in time. The $75.5 million budget is considered reasonable and has strong government support. (It is also closer to the initial target of $30–45 million when the Youth Games concept was announced.) The plan was also praised for its compactness.

=== Evaluation of applicant cities ===
==== Applicant cities comparison ====
2010 Applicant Cities
Category	Details	Athens Greece	Bangkok Thailand	Debrecen Hungary	Guatemala City Guatemala	Kuala Lumpur Malaysia	Moscow Russia	Poznań Poland	Singapore Singapore	Turin Italy
Population	City	745,514 (2001)	5,658,953 (2005)	204,297 (2005)	1,202,536 (2002)	1,800,674 (2004)	10,126,424 (2002)	567,882 (567,882)	4,680,600 (2007)	900,569 (2006)
Population	Country	11,170,957 (2007)	62,828,706 (2006)	10,053,000 (2007)	13,000,000 (2005)	27,356,000 (2007)	142,000,000 (2008 estimate)	38,518,241 (2007)	4,680,600 (2007)	59,206,382 (2007)
Bid budget (million US$)	Total	317.8	33.2	27.8	132.4	60.0	179.8	17.5	75	112
Bid budget (million US$)	Guaranteed subsidy	84	NA	NA	NA	NA	NA	NA	75	NA
Bid budget (million US$)	Estimated sponsorship	161	NA	NA	NA	NA	27	NA	0	27.2
Main airport	Name	Athens	Suvarnabhumi	Debrecen	La Aurora	Kuala Lumpur–International	Sheremetyevo	Poznań	Changi	Turin
Main airport	Distance (km)	20	25		6	50	10		20	
Main airport	Capacity (million)	16.0	45			35			70	
Main airport	Handled (2006)	15,079,662	42,799,532			24,570,385(2006)	12,760,000		35,033,000	
Venues	Total	24	23	26	28	23	28	25	24	21
Venues	Completed	19	23	13	26	22	28	24	19	19
Venues	Temporary	5	0	7	2	1	0	0	4	1
Venues	Travel time (mins)	30	45	<30	>60	<30	<30	15	<30	30
Olympic village	Distance (km)	29	50	2	0	20	14	6	13	11
Olympic village	Beds	4,896	7,638	5,012	4,795	5,500	5,060	5,000	5,000	5,005
Accommodation	Total rooms	7,005	11,039	3,325	1,976	15,541	29,688 (9,459 u/c)	4,321	39,120	8,148
Accommodation	Guaranteed rooms	5,304	3,084	2,623	1,550	3,010	5,259	3,720 (1,501 u/c)	2,710 (1,600 u/c)	3,753

==== IOC evaluation report ====
- (Russia) Moscow — scored 7.5 to 8.5
- Singapore — scored 7.4 to 7.9 (bid details)
- (Greece) Athens — scored 6.2 to 7.2 (bid details)
- (Thailand) Bangkok — scored 5.5 to 6.7
- (Italy) Turin — scored 5.7 to 6.3
- (Malaysia) Kuala Lumpur — scored 4.5 to 5.9
- (Hungary) Debrecen — scored 4.1 to 5.3
- (Poland) Poznań — scored 4.1 to 5.2
- Guatemala City — scored 2.8 to 3.9

Athens (Greece), Bangkok (Thailand), and Turin (Italy) were three bid cities which made it to the short list, but were later eliminated in January 2008. Although Athens' bid had sentiment and state of the art venues from its recent hosting of the 2004 Summer Olympics, its bid was ultimately eliminated for having a very high budget (US$273 million) and having events too far from the central sites. Bangkok was praised for its accommodations and facilities, but like Athens, the venues were too spread out and the nation was also experiencing some political instability. Its budget was also considered inadequate. Turin's plan was somewhat impressive, but a proposed $304 million Olympic Village would not be constructed in time, effectively ending the bid.

==== Evaluation breakdown ====
Each cell of the table provides a minimum and a maximum figure obtained by the applicant city on the specific criteria. The graphs are rounded off to the nearest whole number.

	Athens	Bangkok	Debrecen	Guatemala City	Kuala Lumpur	Moscow	Poznań	Singapore	Turin
Governance (Weighting: 3)	6.0 7.0	5.0 7.0	5.0 6.0	2.0 4.0	4.0 6.0	8.0 9.0	3.0 5.0	9.0	6.0 7.0
General infrastructure (Weighting: 3)	8.1 9.4	3.9 5.9	4.1 6.1	2.9 5.3	4.1 6.9	7.9 9.0	4.0 5.4	8.3 9.1	6.8 8.8
Sport and venues (Weighting: 5)	6.8 7.9	5.9 7.5	3.5 4.6	3.3 4.3	6.7 8.3	7.2 8.9	4.9 5.9	6.5 7.9	6.2 7.6
Culture and education (Weighting: 4)	3.6 5.6	5.6 7.2	3.1 5.2	5.0 6.6	1.0 2.6	6.9 8.5	4.7 6.3	7.2 8.8	5.8 7.6
Youth Olympic Village (Weighting: 5)	6.0 8.5	6.6 7.8	6.0 7.0	2.0 2.9	6.5 7.8	7.7 8.9	4.2 4.9	5.9 6.7	3.0 3.8
Transport operations (Weighting: 2)	6.3 8.3	3.3 5.3	7.1 8.7	3.0 5.0	5.1 6.7	6.5 8.4	6.4 8.1	7.0 8.5	6.0 7.6
Accommodation (Weighting: 2)	8.0 10.0	7.0 10.0	3.0 50.0	2.0 40.0	7.0 10.0	8.0 10.0	6.0 70.0	7.0 10.0	8.0 10.0
Finance and marketing (Weighting: 4)	4.8 6.6	4.2 5.3	3.8 5.2	3.0 5.6	5.8 6.8	5.4 7.2	3.4 4.8	6.2 7.6	5.0 6.8
Overall project (Weighting: 3)	6.0 8.0	4.0 7.0	2.0 5.0	1.0 4.0	3.0 7.0	7.0 9.0	2.0 5.0	7.0 9.5	5.0 8.0
Overall evaluation	6.2 7.2	5.5 6.7	4.1 5.3	2.8 3.9	4.5 5.9	7.5 8.5	4.1 5.2	7.4 7.9	5.7 6.3

== Out of the race ==
=== Eliminated in final vote ===
2010 Finalist City
Name	Country (IOC country code)	Official web site
Moscow	Russia (RUS)	Moscowyog2010
Host of the 1980 Summer Olympics and three IOC Sessions. Russia aggressively campaigned for the games with its prior Olympic history and recent win with the Sochi 2014 Winter Olympics. President Vladimir Putin showed a high profile in support of the games. Moscow planned a "Web University" to enhance interaction and awareness of traditions from all cultures of the world. However, overspending and low revenue were criticized. In the evaluation, the IOC discouraged the use of the web university. Otherwise, Moscow scored high in almost every area except finance, primarily because of a high budget. (Only Athens had a higher proposed budget.) Moscow budgeted US$180 million, including almost half of which (US$76 million) for culture and education programs. The bid was praised for solid government guarantees, an improved contingency fund, and the fact that most venues were ready. Most of the venues and Olympic village are from the 1980 Summer Olympics, which have been maintained over the years. Also cited was Moscow's experience to deliver on time and on target. If they had won, Moscow would have had to work closely with the organizers of Sochi's 2014 Winter Olympics to avoid conflicts in marketing and other areas. Moscow garnered the support of some high-profile celebrities, such as tennis player Maria Sharapova. The Russian Sports Channel RTR-Sport pledged to provide 100% broadcast coverage to all participating countries.

=== Eliminated from Shortlist ===
2010 Short list Cities
Name	Country (IOC country code)	Official web site
Athens	Greece (GRE)	
Main article: Athens bid for the 2010 Summer Youth Olympics Host of the 1896 Summer Olympics the 2004 Summer Olympics and seven IOC Sessions. As stated on their website, Athens was eager to host the Games not only to utilize their state of the art venues, but to establish the Youth Olympics in the "birthplace" of the Modern and Ancient Games. Athens had sentiment on its side, as well as all the recently built venues from 2004. However, the overarching (too high) finances still were questioned, and the bid was criticised for seeming to misunderstand and lack comprehension of the cultural and educational goals. Ultimately, Athens was eliminated for its very high budget (US$273 million), which was reduced from its initial estimate, and failure to provide sufficient hotel guarantees. In desiring to use historic venues as they did in the 2004 Summer Games, concerns were raised that events would be too spread out and cause too much travel time. The bid did noticeably improve its cultural aspect, however.
Bangkok	Thailand (THA)	
Initially, Thailand was hot to bid for the 2016 Summer Olympics after its strong performance at the 2004 Athens Games. Instead, the nation chose to bid for these junior Olympics which have less pressure. The Games were to be held at Thammasat University’s campus in Rangsit where the 1998 Asian Games and the 2007 Summer Universiade were staged. Scheduled between August 8 and 20, 2010. Bangkok was one of the bidding cities for the 2008 Summer Olympics, but failed to become a candidate. Transport, general infrastructure, and finance are the weak points of Bangkok's bid, while excellent accommodations of this resort and tourist mecca are its greatest strength. At Bangkok's elimination, the major factors were too low a budget (US$34 million), widespread venues which again would have caused too great travel times, and with Thailand's recent political upheavals, concerns over upcoming elections and lack of government guarantees.
Turin	Italy (ITA)	
Host of the 2006 Winter Olympics and one IOC Session. At the initial evaluation, although Turin was credited with its strong recent experience, it was an otherwise average ranked city. Particular criticism was aimed at the Olympic Village. With a budget of US$130 million, Turin's bid with refinements was well received, but was effectively ended when it was determined that the proposed Olympic village would not be completed in time for the Games. Turin may set its sights on the inaugural 2012 Winter Youth Olympics as a consolation prize.

=== Non-selected applicant cities ===
2010 Non-selected Applicant Cities
Name	Country (IOC country code)	Official web site
Debrecen	Hungary (HUN)	
Debrecen planned a compact bid. 95% of venues were within walking distance. Over 3,000 free bikes would be available in the “Green bike” program. Debrecen has hosted 12 major sporting events in the past seven years, and also has a high percentage of youth because of the university population. In evaluation, the transport was by far the strongest aspect of the bid; however, the IOC speculated the city may be just too small to host the Games, with budget, accommodations, etc. just not in place.
Guatemala City	Guatemala (GUA)	
Host of one IOC Session. Guatemala City is the only candidate from the Americas and was riding high from its exposure in 2007 to the IOC. The application was evaluated as being low in most categories, although culture and education were strong. It was estimated Guatemala City has much work to do in infrastructure before it may have a solid bid.
Kuala Lumpur	Malaysia (MAS)	
Although strong in accommodations, Kuala Lumpur lacked in almost every evaluation category, especially culture and education.
Poznań	Poland (POL)	
Poznan did not have strong governatorial support and seemed to lack understanding of the financial needs to mount the Games. It was also a relatively isolated city when compared to other bids.

=== Non-finalised applicant cities ===
- Algiers, Algeria - Algiers did not complete the questionnaire due on October 26, thereby dropping out of the race.
- Belgrade, Serbia - On September 19, during an IOC workshop in Lausanne, the Serbian Olympic Committee announced that Belgrade was withdrawing its bid, opting instead to bid for the 2014 Youth Olympics.
- Guadalajara, Mexico - showed initial interest.
- Hamburg, Germany - showed initial interest.
- Lisbon, Portugal - showed initial interest.
