= Badminton World Federation =

International governing body

- Abbreviation: BWF
- Formation: 5 July 1934; 92 years ago
- Founded at: Cheltenham, England
- Type: Sports governing body
- Headquarters: Kuala Lumpur, Malaysia
- Members: 202 national associations
- President: Khunying Patama Leeswadtrakul
- Revenue: US$38 million (2026)
- Expenses: US$35 million (2026)
- Website: bwfbadminton.com

The Badminton World Federation (BWF) is the international sports governing body sanctioned by the International Olympic Committee for badminton. It was founded on 5 July 1934 as the International Badminton Federation, with nine member nations: Canada, Denmark, England, France, Ireland, the Netherlands, New Zealand, Scotland, and Wales. The IBF merged with the World Badminton Federation in 1981 and renamed itself the Badminton World Federation in 2006.

When the BWF was founded, its head office was located in Cheltenham, UK. It relocated to Kuala Lumpur in 2005. Khunying Patama Leeswadtrakul of Thailand is the current president. The BWF has 202 member national associations organised into five continental confederations.

== Continental federations ==
Map of the world with five confederations

The BWF works in co-operation with regional governing bodies to promote and develop the sport of badminton around the world, they are:

Region	Confederation	Members
Asia	Badminton Asia (BA)	45
Europe	Badminton Europe (BE)	53
Americas	Badminton Pan America (BPA)	38
Africa	Badminton Africa	49
Oceania	Badminton Oceania (BO)	17
Total		202

== Presidents ==
Below is the list of presidents since 1934:

No.	Years	Name	Country
1	1934–1955	George Alan Thomas	United Kingdom
2	1955–1957	John Plunkett-Dillon	Ireland
3	1957–1959	Brigadier Bruce Hay	United Kingdom
4	1959–1961	A. C. J. van Vossen	Netherlands
5	1961–1963	John McCallum	Ireland
6	1963–1965	Nils Peder Kristensen	Denmark
7	1965–1969	David Bloomer	United Kingdom
8	1969–1971	Humphrey Chilton	United Kingdom
9	1971–1974	Ferry Sonneville	Indonesia
10	1974–1976	Stuart Wyatt	United Kingdom
11	1976–1981	Stellan Mohlin	Sweden
12	1981–1984	Craig Reedie	United Kingdom
13	1984–1986	Poul-Erik Nielsen	Denmark
14	1986–1990	Ian Palmer	New Zealand
15	1990–1993	Arthur Jones	United Kingdom
16	1993–2001	Lu Shengrong	China
17	2001–2005	Korn Dabbaransi	Thailand
18	2005–2013	Kang Young-joong	South Korea
19	2013–2025	Poul-Erik Høyer Larsen	Denmark
20	2025–	Patama Leeswadtrakul	Thailand

== Rankings ==
The BWF World Ranking and BWF World Junior Ranking are introduced to determine the strength of the players. BWF World Ranking is used for determining the qualification for entry and seeding for the BWF-sanctioned tournament. The points awarded is based on the final results of each tournament participated for the past 52 weeks. Junior Ranking consists of players under 19 years old.

== Tournaments ==
=== Grade 1 (S-Tier) ===
The BWF regularly organises seven major international badminton events and two events for para-badminton:

==== Main ====
- BWF World Championships
- Thomas Cup: Men's national teams
- Uber Cup: Women's national teams
- Sudirman Cup: Mixed national teams
- Olympic Games(in co-operation with IOC)

==== Others ====
- BWF World Junior Championships
- BWF World Senior Championships
- BWF Para-Badminton World Championships
- Paralympic Games(in co-operation with IPC)

==== Defunct ====
- Badminton World Cup: Suspended after 1997 but was revived in 2005 only as an invitational tournament.

=== Grade 2 (A-Tier) ===
Grade 2 tournaments, known as BWF World Tour was sanctioned into six levels with different world ranking points awarded.

==== Main ====
- Level 1: BWF World Tour Finals
- Level 2: BWF World Tour Super 1000
- Level 3: BWF World Tour Super 750
- Level 4: BWF World Tour Super 500
- Level 5: BWF World Tour Super 300
- Level 6: BWF Tour Super 100

==== Defunct ====
- Super Series Premier
- Super Series
- Grand Prix Gold
- Grand Prix

=== Grade 3 (B-Tier) ===
Grade 3 tournaments, known as Continental Circuit, are sanctioned into three levels with different world ranking points awarded.

- International Challenge
- International Series
- Future Series

== Awards ==
The BWF bestows special honours onto players, umpires, sponsors, and other individuals for their achievement in badminton or for their contributions to badminton.

- BWF Awards
- Lifetime Achievement
- Hall of Fame
- Herbert Scheele Trophy
- Distinguished Service
- Meritorius Service
- Certificate of Commendation

== Logo ==
Over the years, the organization has had several logos. Originally it used the IBF logo. As the organization was renamed to BWF, a new logo designed by Aboeb Luthfy of Indonesia featuring a shuttlecock circling a stylized globe was adopted in 2007. In May 2012, it adopted a new, streamlined logo featuring the letters "BWF" inside a red stylized shuttlecock.

== Publications ==
- World Badminton (Journal)
- The IBF Handbook

== See also ==
- BWF World Ranking
- World Badminton Federation (merged with the IBF in 1981)
