= Korea Institute of Public Administration =

South Korean research institute

- Hangul: 한국행정연구원
- Hanja: 韓國行政硏究院
- RR: Hanguk haengjeong yeonguwon
- MR: Han'guk haengjŏng yŏn'guwŏn

The Korea Institute of Public Administration (KIPA) is a government-sponsored research institute in South Korea, established in October 1991. They do research not just on current issues of public administration but historical ones as well, as in 2009 when a researcher presented a seminar paper about the effectiveness of public spending during the reign of Sejong the Great in the 15th century. In December 2009, new institute head Bak Yung-gyeok withdrew their labour research group from the Korean Confederation of Trade Unions and dissolved it. In June 2010, they held a seminar on the Lee Myung-bak administration's regulatory reforms. In March 2017, the Institute held a reception at the American Society for Public Administration, and described their main research department and its duties (e.g., Department of Evaluation, Center for International Cooperation, Department of Public Safety and Social Cohesion Research). The Korea Institute of Public Administration offers collaborative research and visiting research fellow positions with agreements ranging from the United States and Russia, to Côte d'Ivoire, Japan and Uzbekistan, among others.
