= Singapore bid for the 2010 Summer Youth Olympics =

Bids for the 2010 Summer Youth Olympics
Overview
- Games of the I Youth Olympiad
- Winner: Singapore; Runner-up: Moscow; Shortlist: Athens · Bangkok · Turin

Details
- City: Singapore
- NOC: Singapore National Olympic Council (SNOC)

Evaluation
- IOC score: 53

Previous Games hosted
- None

Decision
- Result: Singapore won the bid

Singapore hosted the inaugural 2010 Youth Olympic Games (YOG). According to the Singapore National Olympic Council (SNOC), Singapore's concept embraced the Olympic values, with fully integrated Sports, Education and Culture programmes to engage and inspire young people.

== Background ==
Host of the 117th IOC Session, Singapore made its first formal bid to host a multi-disciplinary sporting event of this magnitude, bigger than its previous hostings of the Southeast Asian Games in 1973, 1983 and 1993. It banked on its high connectivity with the world, its youthfulness as an independent country and its reputation for excellence and multi-racial harmony. The city-state rolled out a high-publicity campaign. These included being amongst the first to launch its official website, bid logo (dispute IOC rules against bid logos) and a bid tagline "Blazing the Trail" on 16 October 2007 and getting the local populace to support its bid, including an effort by students to collect 1 million signatures in support of the games.

Singapore's bid got off to a rocky start when Prime Minister Lee Hsien Loong expressed concern on 15 July 2007 that the city may not be ready to host the games as the Singapore Sports Hub is expected to be ready only in 2011. By 10 August 2007, however, the city announced its intentions to proceed with the bid. Former Parliamentary Secretary for Community Development, Youth and Sports Teo Ser Luck went to Beijing with Ng Ser Miang and other government officials on a "fact-finding" mission from 25 to 28 September 2007.

On 8 October 2007, Prime Minister Lee expressed full support in Singapore's bid after meeting IOC president Jacques Rogge in Lausanne. Singapore's bid documents were submitted on 23 October 2007, two days before the IOC's deadline.

== Bid details ==
=== Venues ===
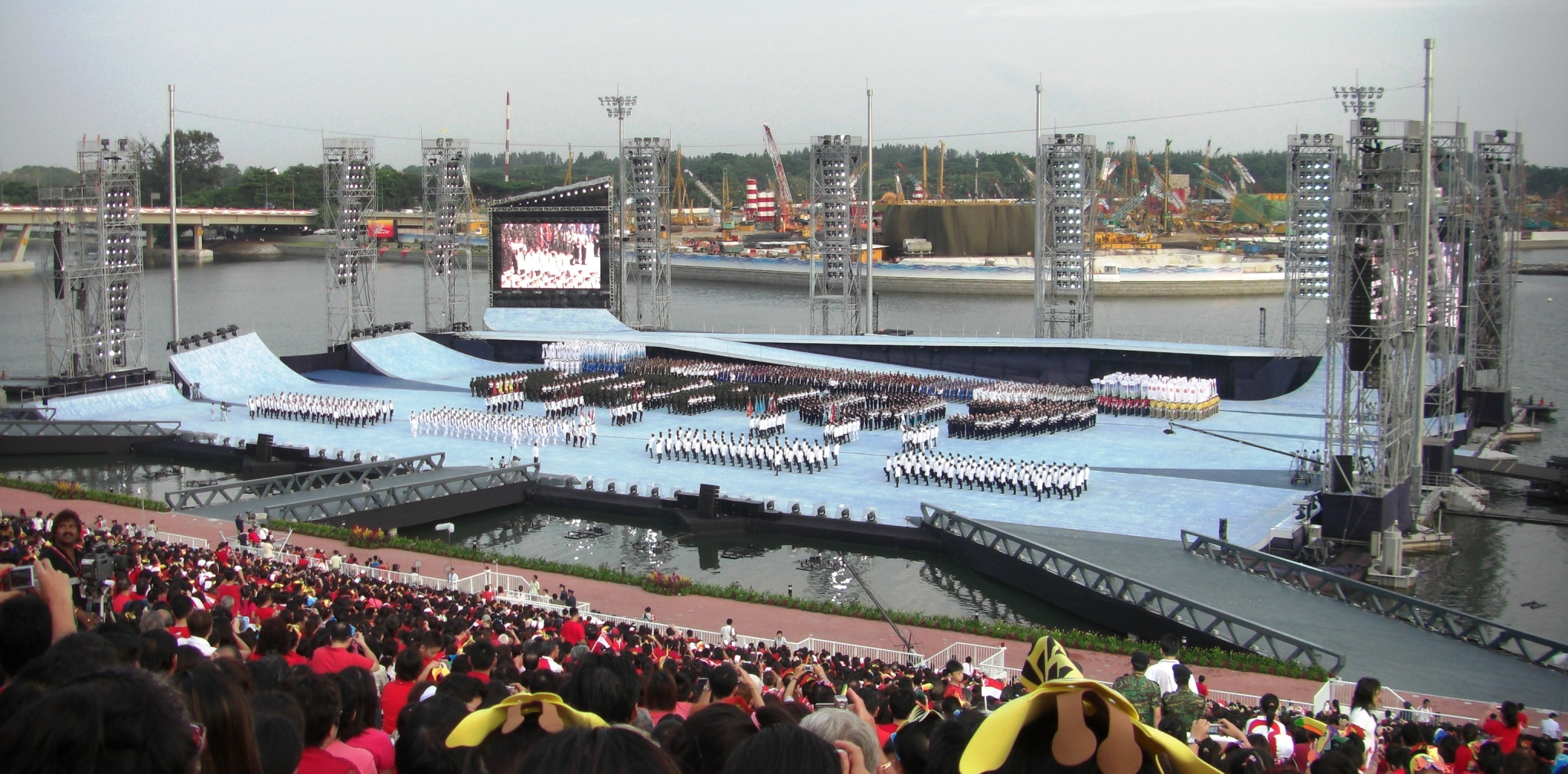
The Float at Marina Bay, site of the Opening and Closing ceremonies

Singapore intends to put up "fully integrated sport, education and cultural programmes" as part of its bid, with emphasise on "compactness" and "vibrancy". All 26 sports will be featured, utilising 24 venues around the city. Suburban facilities such as the Bishan Stadium (for athletics), the Singapore Sports School (Modern Pentathlon), Tampines Bike Park (cycling) and the Toa Payoh Swimming Complex (aquatics and diving) were highlighted as a means of bringing the event to the people. The Youth Olympic Village will be located at the new student residential village of the National University of Singapore, slated for completion months before the event on the former Warren Golf Course. Amongst other educational plans, the bid includes a proposal to build a Sports Museum and Library and the offer of six Singapore Olympic Scholarships annually for young athletes to attend the Singapore Sports School.

Venue	Sports
Toa Payoh Swimming Complex	Aquatics (Diving)
Singapore Sports School	Aquatics (Swimming), Modern pentathlon, Volleyball, Weightlifting
Kallang Cricket Field	Archery
Bishan Stadium	Athletics, Football (Finals)
Singapore Indoor Stadium	Badminton, Basketball (Olympic)
Kallang Netball Centre	Basketball (Street)
International Convention Centre	Boxing, Fencing, Handball, Judo, Taekwondo, Wrestling (Indoor)
Marina Reservoir	Canoeing (Flatwater), Rowing
Tampines Bike Park	Cycling (BMX and Mountain Bike)
Singapore Turf Club Riding School	Equestrian
Choa Chu Kang Stadium	Football (Preliminary)
Jurong West Stadium	Football (Preliminary)
Bishan Sports Hall	Gymnastics
National Hockey Centre	Hockey
National Sailing Centre	Sailing
Toa Payoh Sports Hall	Shooting, Table tennis
Kallang Tennis Centre	Tennis
East Coast Park	Triathlon
Sentosa Siloso Beach	Beach volleyball, Beach wrestling

=== Accommodation ===
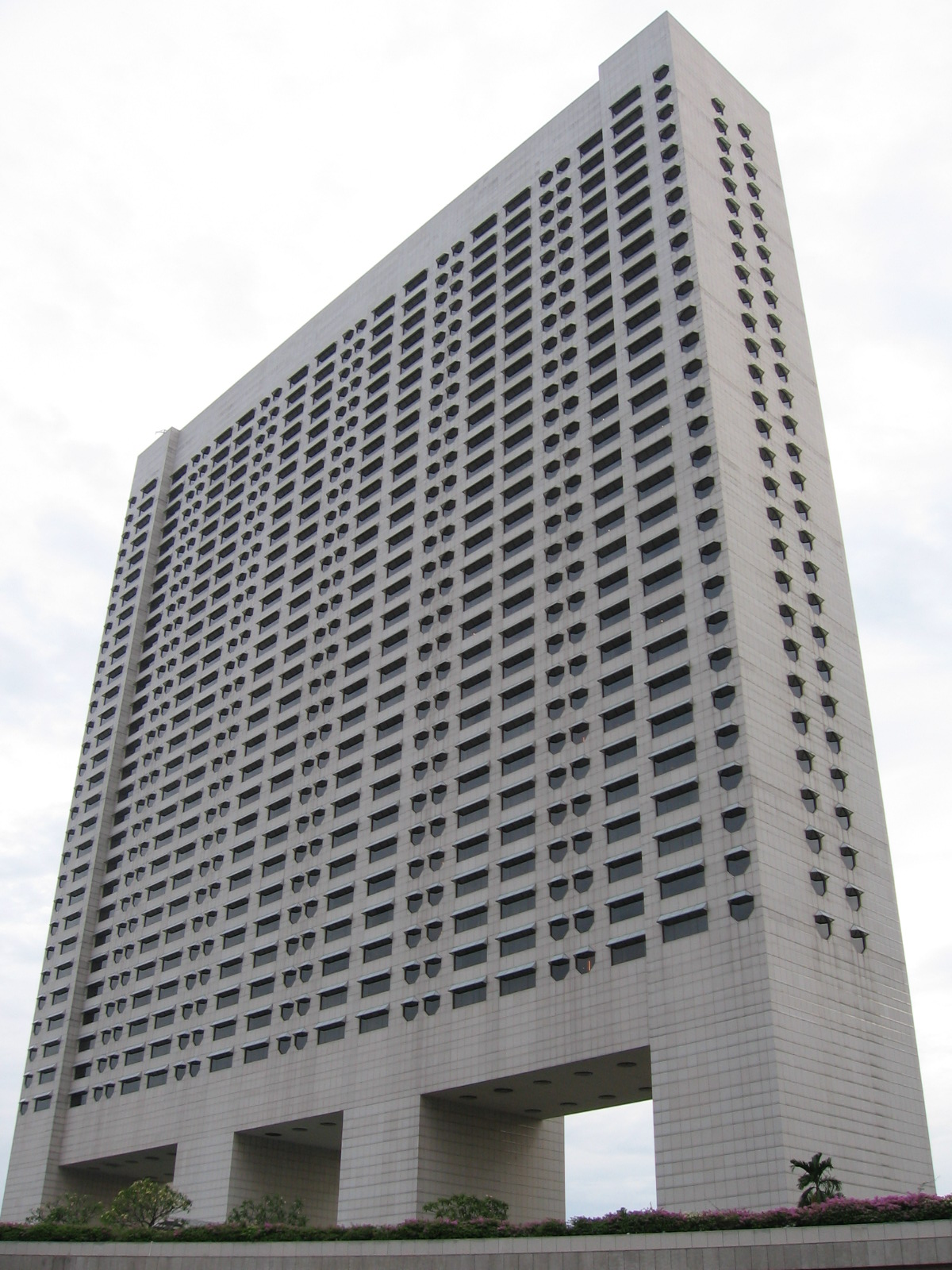
The Ritz-Carlton Millenia Singapore

The Bid Committee has secured 4,310 guaranteed rooms in 36 hotels. The IOC Hotel will be The Ritz-Carlton Millenia Singapore. Media accommodation and the MMC will be at The Marina Bay Sands.

=== Transportation and infrastructure ===
All Singapore 2010 competition and non-competition venues will be within 30 minutes of the Youth Olympic Village (YOV), the Main Media Centre (MMC) and the Olympic Family hotels (OFH).

An Event Transport Operations Centre (ETOC) will manage all transport-related matters specific to the YOG.

==== Concept plan ====
- Central control and information – Providing real-time travel information.
- Comprehensive Shuttle Service – Direct bus services will link all YOG venues for all accredited persons.
- Olympic Lanes – Olympic Lanes will be designated along key routes for faster access to all YOG venues.
- Complimentary public transport – All accredited persons will enjoy complimentary travel on public buses and the subway throughout the duration of the YOG.

Singapore Changi Airport will be used for the YOG. It is connected to more than 130 airports worldwide and 80 international airlines operate scheduled services via Singapore to 191 cities in 59 countries. The national carrier, Singapore Airlines, serves more than 180 cities. The airport has four terminals, including a budget terminal.

== Bid committee ==
There were 14 members in Singapore's 2010 Youth Olympic Games Bid Committee. They are:

- Teo Ser Luck – Former parliamentary secretary for Ministry of Community Development, Youth and Sports
- Ng Ser Miang – IOC executive board member
- Niam Chiang Meng – Former permanent secretary for Ministry of Community Development, Youth and Sports
- Chew Hock Yong – Former deputy secretary for Ministry of Community Development, Youth and Sports
- Chris Chan – Secretary general for Singapore National Olympic Council
- Tan Eng Liang – Vice president of Singapore National Olympic Council
- Lim Hup Seng – Former deputy secretary of Ministry of Finance
- Sim Gim Guan – Deputy secretary of Ministry of Information, Communication and the Arts
- Sum Chee Wah – Former director (Education Programmes Division) of Ministry of Education
- Oon Jin Teik – Former chief executive officer of Singapore Sports Council
- Catherine McNabb – Former director (Business Travel and MICE Group) of Singapore Tourism Board
- Francis Chong – Former director (Youth Division) of Ministry of Community Development, Youth and Sports
- Chan Mun Wei – Former director (Sports Division) of Ministry of Community Development, Youth and Sports
- Richard Tan Kok Tong – Director (Communications and International Relations Division) – Ministry of Community Development, Youth and Sports

== Assessment ==
At the end of the presentation process, a senior International Olympic Committee member declared Singapore as a favourite for the 2010 Youth Olympic Games after ruling out Athens, Moscow and Turin for having been previous hosts of Olympic events and the possibility of an early elimination of Bangkok's bid. Moscow, the highest rated city in the evaluation report, may be disadvantaged due to unhappiness related to the win by Russian city Sochi to host the 2014 Winter Olympics. On 21 February 2008, Singapore was announced as the winner of the bid.

== See also ==
- Youth Olympic Games
- 2010 Summer Youth Olympics
- 2010 Youth Olympics bids
