= Patama Leeswadtrakul =

Thai businesswoman and sports administrator

Khun Ying Patama Leeswadtrakul ChCh ChD KCE KCM
- ปัทมา ลีสวัสดิ์ตระกูล
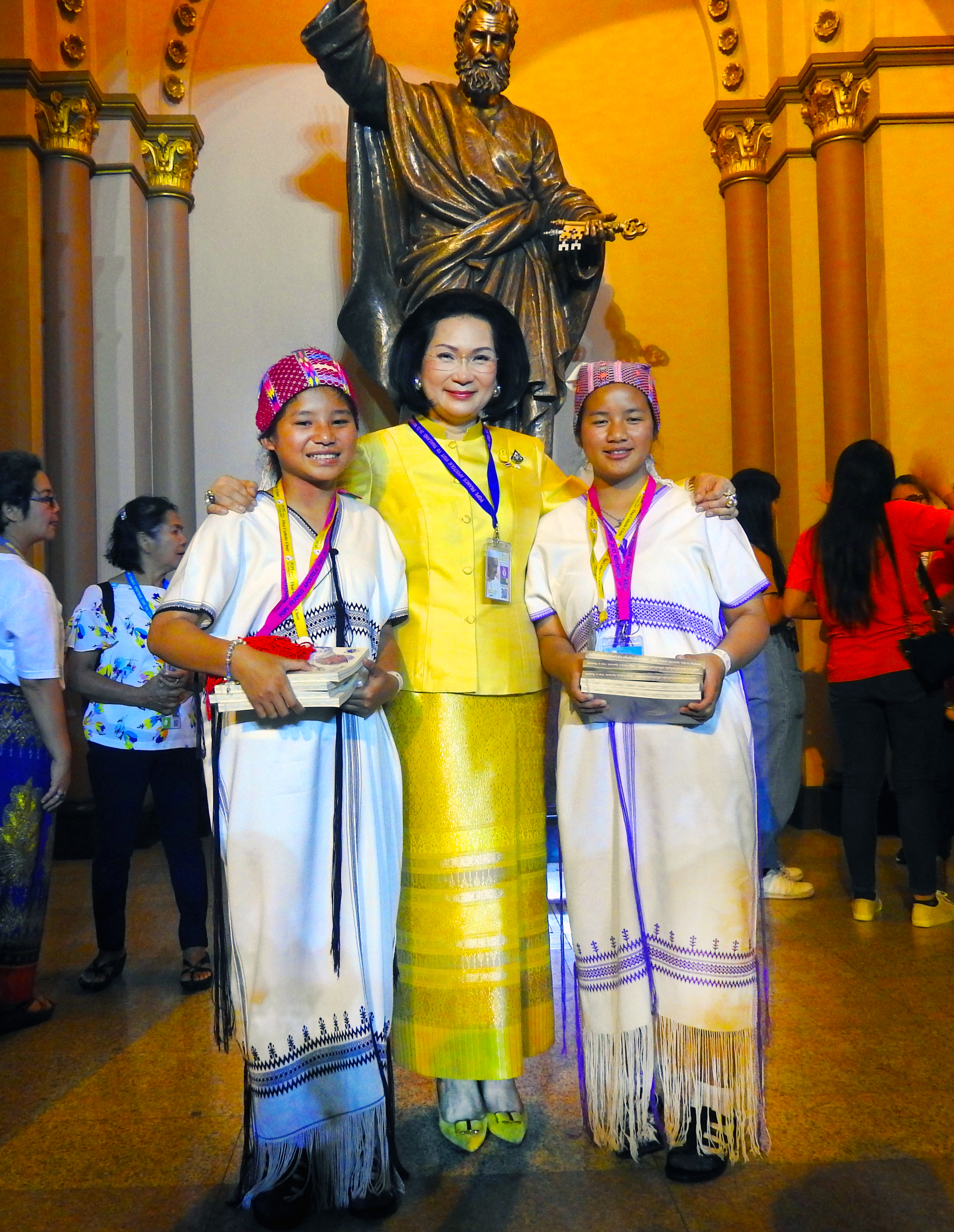
- Leeswadtrakul (center)
- Born: 16 February 1965 (age 61); Bangkok, Thailand
- Education: Ramkhamhaeng University; University of Manchester
- Occupations: Businessperson sports administrator
- Known for: Member of the International Olympic Committee; President of the Badminton World Federation; President of the Badminton Association of Thailand
- Board member of: Arnoma Grand Hotel Bangkok; Felix River Kwai Resort; G Steel Public Company Limited)
- Website: www.patama.com

Khunying Patama Leeswadtrakul (Thai: ปัทมา ลีสวัสดิ์ตระกูล; born 16 February 1965) is a Thai businesswoman, and sports administrator. She is the chairperson of Arnoma Grand in Pathum Wan, Bangkok, and Felix River Kwai in Kanchanaburi, and managing director of GSTEL. She is also a senior expert director of Thailand Institute of Justice, and Office of Contemporary Art and Culture in National Council for Peace and Order era. As sports administrator, She is a member of the International Olympic Committee, president of Badminton World Federation, an executive member of Olympic Council of Asia and National Olympic Committee of Thailand, and the president of Badminton Association of Thailand.

== Early life and education ==
Patama Leeswadtrakul was born in 1965 in Bangkok, Thailand. Patama study in primary and secondary at St. Francis Xavier Convent School and then Assumption Commercial School, she studies in Bachelor of Economics and Bachelor of Business Administration at Ramkhamhaeng University. In master's degree at The University of Manchester in Master of Science Human Resource Development and Honorary Doctorate degree at Philosophy Administration Program from Ramkhamhaeng University.
