= Camilo López =

Paraguayan sports organiser

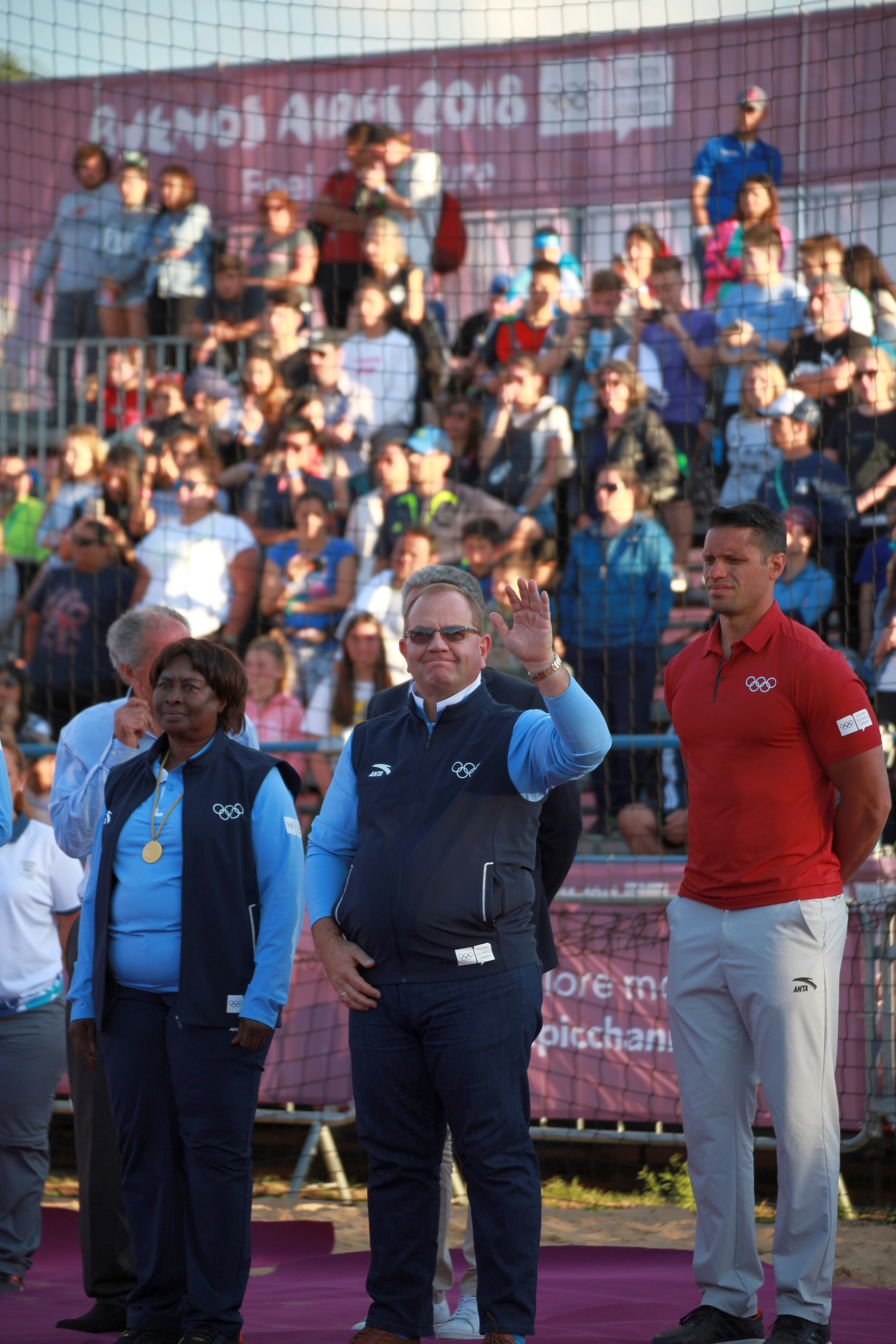
Camilo Pérez at the 2018 Summer Youth Olympics.

Camilo Pérez López Moreira (born 31 March 1969) is a Paraguayan sports organiser. He has been a member of the International Olympic Committee (IOC) since 2018.

== Education ==
Pérez studied 4th year Law School at the Universidad Católica "Nuestra Señora de la Asunción".

== Career ==
At the age of 19, Pérez started working alongside his father in the family business. In 2019, Pérez took over the presidency of he real estate company Don Camilo S.A. after his father retired. He was shareholder there, as well as at Clear S.A. Telecommunications Claro Paraguay Agent previously under AMX Paraguay.

== Sports career ==
Pérez was an active tennis player he ranked 1st in the nation, in the 12 and under category, the 14 and under category, as well as the 16 and under category. In Athletics, Pérez represented the Colegio Goethe from 1980 to 1987 in every athletic competition (the 100-meter and relay race). From 1982 to 1989, Pérez played football for the Goethe Schule team. He was also an avid water skier, becoming the Junior National Buoy Champion from 1983 to 1985, and the National Ski Jump Champion from 1986 to 1987. In the world of motor sports, from 1990 to 2002, Pérez was an active participant of the National Rally Championship in which he managed to obtain a position as official co-pilot for car companies like Volkswagen and Toyota. He was National Rally Champion in 1995, 1997, 1998, and 2000 and in 2000 he was also South American Rally Champion.

Moriera got involved with sports administration indirectly in high school through his active participation in the student council. In 2003, he was a delegate of the Centenario Club with the Paraguayan Tennis Association (APT). Where he was also a member of the Tennis Board from 2003 until 2007. His first official position was as treasurer of the motorsport body which organized competitions in Paraguay, and in South America, in 2004. In 2005, he was a member of the Junior Committee of the Paraguayan Tennis Association, where he then moved up to became president of the ATP from 2006 to 2010, as well as 2010 to 2013. Where he then took on the position of president at the South America Tennis Confederation (COSAT). Additionally in 2011, Pérez became president of the Paraguayan Olympic Committee. Pérez was a member of the Panam Sports Solidarity Commission, as well as the Executive Council, and was also Chairman of the Finance Commission in 2017. That same year, he was also President of the South American Sports Organization (ODESUR). In 2018, Pérez became a member of the Executive Council for the Association of National Olympic Committees (ANOC), as well as was active in the International Tennis Federation (ITF) as board member, Development Advisor Group member, Regional presidents Committee member, and chair of the Olympic Movement Engagement Committee. Also in 2018, he was elected member of the International Olympic Committee. In 2019, he was a member of the 2028 Summer Olympics Olympic Games Coordination Commission, as well as on the Olympic Programme Commission.

== Awards ==
Pérez was named Best Sports Leader of the year 2012, and "favourite Son of Asunción" in 2013 from the Main Board of the local municipality. He has received various recognitions from the National Congress of the Republic of Paraguay for Sporting Achievements during the 2018 South American Games, Cochabamba (2018), and Illustrious Citizens of the City of Asunción (2020).
