= 2027 Special Olympics World Summer Games =

Multi-sport event

17th Special Olympics World Summer Games Juegos Mundiales de Verano de Olimpiadas Especiales 2027
- Host city: Santiago, Chile
- Events: 23 sports
- Opening: 16 October 2027
- Closing: 24 October 2027
- Ceremony venue: Julio Martínez Prádanos National Stadium
- Website: santiago2027.org

Summer

Winter

The 2027 Special Olympics World Summer Games, officially known as the XVII Special Olympic World Games or the Special Olympics World Games Santiago 2027 (Spanish: Juegos Mundiales de Verano de Olimpiadas Especiales 2027), will be 17th summer Special Olympics from 16 to 24 October 2027. Scheduled to be held in Santiago, Chile, it will be the first time that a World Games will take place in the Southern Hemisphere. It will also be the first World Games in Latin America, and in a Spanish-speaking country.

== Bids ==
All three bids were from countries in the Southern Hemisphere.

=== Confirmed host city ===
- Chile

- Santiago
After the success of the 2023 Pan American Games the Chilean President Gabriel Boric announced that the Chilean government will apply to host the 2027 Special Olympics World Summer Games. It was confirmed on 24 April 2024 that Santiago will host the Games.

=== Non-selected bids ===
- Indonesia

- Jakarta
Youth and Sports Minister Dito Ariotedjo gladly welcomed the offer from Special Olympics International (SOI) for Indonesia to take the opportunity to host the 2027 Special Olympics World Games. Like Santiago, Jakarta would've been the first city in the Southern Hemisphere to host Special Olympics World Games, and only the sixth Special Olympics World Summer Games outside the United States.

=== Cancelled bids ===
- Australia

- Perth
Special Olympics Australia had been proactively briefing State and Federal Ministers and Members of Parliament who have expressed their interest and support on a bipartisan basis. Dr. Timothy Shriver, Chairman of the Special Olympics International Board of Directors, called upon governments, businesses, philanthropists and the local community to rally behind Australia’s bid to host the 2027 Special Olympics World Games in Perth. Funding, however, was in limbo with both state and federal governments refusing to support the bid.

== Venues ==
Events will take place in the following venues:

- National Stadium Sports Park
  - Julio Martínez Prádanos National Stadium (opening ceremony)
  - Mario Recordón Training Center (athletics)
  - Training Center for Collective Sport (basketball)
  - 3x3 Basketball Center (3x3 basketball)
  - Chilean Paralympic Training Center (bocce, motor activity training program, table tennis)
  - Football 7 Center (football)
  - South American Games Training Center (gymnastics)
  - Field Hockey Training Center (field hockey)
  - Contact Sports Training Center (powerlifting)
  - Aquatic Center (swimming)
  - Tennis and Racket Sports Training Center (tennis)
- Olympic Training Center
  - Badminton Pavillion (badminton)
  - Volleyball Pavillion (volleyball)
- Club Deportivo USS (futsal, padel (demonstration sport))
- Peñalolen Park Beach Volleyball Center (beach volleyball)
- Carabineros de Chile School (equestrian)
- Laguna Carén (cycling)
- Club de Golf Mapocho (golf)

Venues for open water swimming and triathlon are yet to be determined.

== Sports ==
Competitions are to be held in the following 23 sports:

2027 Special Olympics World Summer Games sports
- Aquatics
  - Diving
  - Open water swimming
  - Swimming
- Athletics
- Badminton
- Basketball
- 3x3 basketball
- Beach volleyball
- Bocce
- Cycling
- Equestrian
- Field hockey
- Football
- Futsal
- Golf
- Gymnastics
  - Artistic gymnastics
  - Rhythmic gymnastics
- Handball
- Judo
- Kayaking
- Motor Activity Training Program
- Powerlifting
- Roller skating
- Sailing
- Table tennis
- Tennis
- Triathlon
  - Aquathlon
  - Duathlon
  - Triathlon
- Volleyball
- Windsurfing
- Wrestling

Diving, triathlon (including duathlon and aquathlon), windsurfing and wrestling will make their debut at the Special Olympics. Padel will be a demonstration sport.

== Marketing ==
The official logo was unveiled on 26 January 2026. The logo visually expresses how Chile embraces the global spirit of Special Olympics. The shapes and colors are arranged in a circle to reflect constant connection. At the center is the international symbol of Special Olympics surrounded by icons reflecting Chile’s identity, nature, and diversity. The relationship between the elements carries rich symbolism: a world revolving around inclusion with Chile embracing all participants and offering a space where everyone can participate, connect, and celebrate with no barriers.
