= Luis Mejía Oviedo =

Dominican sports executive

Luis Rafael Mejía Oviedo (born September 4, 1953, Santo Domingo, Dominican Republic) is an economist, communicator, sportsman and sports executive. He is currently the president of the Dominican Republic Olympic Committee (COLIMDO), an entity he has directed since 2006, in addition to being the president of the Central American and Caribbean Sports Organization (ODECABE) and a member of the commissions on Women in Sport and Public Affairs and Social Development through Sport of the International Olympic Committee (IOC).

== Sports administration ==
He began his career in sports administration as President of the Aboriginal Sports League, which he directed for one year (1977–1978). He then served as Vice President of the National District Softball Association (1979–1981) and later President of that same entity until 1986, as well as Secretary General of the C&C Softball Championship Organizing Committee in 1981. Later he was President of the Dominican Softball Federation, a position he held for 26 years (1983–2009). During that period of time he occupied different positions; being Vice President of the International Softball Federation (1988–1990), Secretary General of the Dominican Olympic Committee (1991–2003) and President of the same sports entity (2003–present), besides being Secretary General of the Organizing Committee of the Pan American Games Santo Domingo 2003.

== Dominican Olympic Committee ==
The Dominican Republic Olympic Committee (COLIMDO) is the body that represents the national sport before the International Olympic Committee (IOC), the Olympic Games, the Pan American Games and the Central American and Caribbean Games. Its headquarters are located in Santo Domingo, Dominican Republic. On three occasions it has been the entity responsible for holding international sports events in the Dominican Republic, such as the Central American and Caribbean Games of 1974 and 1986, as well as the Pan American Games of 2003.

In this entity Mejía Oviedo has occupied different positions until becoming president, a position he has held since 2003 until the present. He was secretary general in three different periods: period from 1990 to 1994, period from 1994 to 1998 and 1998 to 2002. Then he was 1st vice president, a position he held during the presidency of Dr. José Joaquín Puello, and later became president from 2003 and continues to lead the entity today.

== ODECABE ==
He was elected President of the Central American and Caribbean Sports Organization (ODECABE) for the period 2019–2023. Mejía's election took place during the institution's National Election Assembly held on October 31, 2019 in Panama City, Panama. With this important election, Mejía Oviedo became the second Dominican to reach this position in the history of sports leadership. The first Dominican to have achieved this position was Dr. José Joaquín Puello, who presided over this organization for several periods.

== IOC ==
The International Olympic Committee (IOC) is the body responsible for promoting Olympism in the world and coordinating the activities of the Olympic Movement. It is in charge of supervising and managing everything related to the Olympic Games. Mejía Oviedo is a member of this important entity at world level: Women in Sport, of which he is a member from 2017 to the present; and Public Affairs and Social Development through Sport, of which he is a member from 2018 to the present.
