= Filomena Fortes =

Cape Verdean sports administrator and handball player

President of the Cape Verdean Olympic Committee
- Incumbent
- Assumed office 2014

President of the Handball Federation of Cape Verde
- In office 2014–2017

Personal details
- Born: 10 April 1966 (age 60) Luanda, Portuguese Angola
- Education: Manuel Fajardo University of Sciences of Physical Culture and Sport; University of Porto; NOVA University Lisbon
- Occupation: Sports administrator; handball player
Handball career
Senior clubs
- Years: Team
- ?–?: C.D. Primeiro de Agosto
- ?–?: Clube Ferroviário de Luanda

Filomena Maria Spencer Africano Fortes (born 10 April 1966) is a Cape Verdean sports administrator and former handball player. Originally a handball player for C.D. Primeiro de Agosto and Clube Ferroviário de Luanda, she worked in sports education including as the University of Cape Verde's coordinator of the physical education and sports courses. She later became president of the Cape Verdean Olympic Committee and the Handball Federation of Cape Verde, as well as the first International Olympic Committee permanent member from Cape Verde.

== Biography ==
Filomena Maria Spencer Africano Fortes was born on 10 April 1966 in Luanda, Angola. In 1979, she started playing handball after a brief stint in association football, including for C.D. Primeiro de Agosto and Clube Ferroviário de Luanda; she later recalled that this decision was "perhaps because in Luanda it was the most popular sport for women". She also worked as a handball coach from 1984 to 1995.

After abandoning her medicine studies in Luanda, Fontes was educated at the Manuel Fajardo University of Sciences of Physical Culture and Sport, in Cuba, and the University of Porto (where she got her master degree in sport sciences), before she obtained her PhD in education sciences at NOVA University Lisbon. Fortes worked as a secondary school physical education teacher, before working as the University of Cape Verde's coordinator of the physical education and sports courses (1996-2014).

In 2014, she became president of the Cape Verdean Olympic Committee (COC) - and the first woman to hold the position - and the Handball Federation of Cape Verde, remaining in the latter position until 2017. On July 2018, she was awarded the African Olympic Order Medal by the Association of National Olympic Committees of Africa. In 2019, she became the first Cape Verdean to become an International Olympic Committee permanent member. From 2019 to 2020, she was a member of the coordination committee of the 2028 Summer Olympics. In November 2021, she was elected vice-president of the Association francophone de comités nationaux olympiques. In 2021, she was re-elected COC president for her third straight term. After serving as vice-president, she became president of ACOLOP in 2022. She was awarded the Peace Run's 2024 Torch-Bearer Award for her work in peacemaking and the Olympic movement. She has also served in the Comité Paralímpico de Cabo Verde (including as a founding member), as an International Teqball Federation Executive Board member, and as an IOC representative on the World Anti-Doping Agency board.

In an interview with Nós Genti, she once said that she was "a bit critical of top-level sports in Cape Verde", citing the differences of her own experiences in her native Cape Verde and her own expectations, as well as the large amount of natives playing abroad, but acknowledged the progress her sport has made in the nation and her support for making Olympic solidarity nationally widespread.
