= Bids for the Youth Olympic Games =

The Youth Olympics are a multi-sport event organized by the International Olympic Committee (IOC) every two years, alternating between Summer Youth Olympics and Winter Youth Olympics. Selection of the host city is done by postal voting by the members of the IOC four to five years prior to the tournament, in which the IOC members vote between candidate cities which have submitted bids. Bids for the first five Summer Games have been made by 17 cities in 16 countries.

The bid process consists of two rounds. First, cities and national Olympic committees (NOCs) may show their interest and submit a preliminary bid, becoming applicant cities. Through analysis of the questionnaires, the IOC gave a weighted-average score to each city based on the scores obtained in each of the questionnaire's eleven themes: political and social support, general infrastructure, sports venues, Olympic Village, environment, accommodation, transport, security, past experience, finance, and legacy. IOC's executive committee then selects a short-list of candidate cities. The candidate cities are investigated by the IOC Evaluation Committee, who make an evaluation report. These submit a more extensive bid book and are subject to additional evaluation, which is presented to the IOC members. Voting occurs as an exhaustive ballot by mail, which may occur through multiple rounds until a single city holds a majority of the votes. IOC members from a candidate NOC may not vote in any round while their country remains in the election. The first two selections were done by postal votes; since the selection for the 2014 Games, voting has been done at an IOC Session.

== Summer Youth Olympic Games ==
The following is a list of bids for the Summer Youth Olympics, sorted by year. It consists of the year the Games were held or scheduled to be held, the date the decision was made, the city and country which issued the bid, and the result of the bid parties. The bid listed first for each games is the one selected by the IOC.

Games	Year	Bid party		Result	Final selection process		Note
Games	Year	City	NOCs	Result	Date	IOC Session	Note
I	2010	Singapore	Singapore	Awarded to host the I Summer Youth Olympic Games (53 votes)	21 February 2008	None, Postal vote	
I	2010	Moscow	Russia	Eliminated in the first voting (44 votes)	21 February 2008	None, Postal vote	
I	2010	Athens	Greece	Not shortlisted to the final candidature stage	21 February 2008	None, Postal vote	
I	2010	Bangkok	Thailand	Not shortlisted to the final candidature stage	21 February 2008	None, Postal vote	
I	2010	Turin	Italy	Not shortlisted to the final candidature stage	21 February 2008	None, Postal vote	
I	2010	Debrecen	Hungary	Not shortlisted to the candidature stage	21 February 2008	None, Postal vote	
I	2010	Guatemala City	Guatemala	Not shortlisted to the candidature stage	21 February 2008	None, Postal vote	
I	2010	Kuala Lumpur	Malaysia	Not shortlisted to the candidature stage	21 February 2008	None, Postal vote	
I	2010	Poznań	Poland	Not shortlisted to the candidature stage	21 February 2008	None, Postal vote	
II	2014	Nanjing	China	Awarded to host the II Summer Youth Olympic Games (47 votes)	10 February 2010	122nd in Vancouver, Canada	
II	2014	Poznań	Poland	Eliminated in the first voting (42 votes)	10 February 2010	122nd in Vancouver, Canada	
II	2014	Guadalajara	Mexico	Withdrew during the candidature stage	10 February 2010	122nd in Vancouver, Canada	
III	2018	Buenos Aires	Argentina	Awarded to host the III Summer Youth Olympic Games (49 votes)	4 July 2013	Extraordinary in Lausanne, Switzerland	
III	2018	Medellín	Colombia	Eliminated in the second voting (39 votes)	4 July 2013	Extraordinary in Lausanne, Switzerland	
III	2018	Glasgow	Great Britain	Eliminated in the first voting (13 votes)	4 July 2013	Extraordinary in Lausanne, Switzerland	
III	2018	Poznań	Poland	Withdrew during the candidature stage	4 July 2013	Extraordinary in Lausanne, Switzerland	
III	2018	Rotterdam	Netherlands	Withdrew during the candidature stage	4 July 2013	Extraordinary in Lausanne, Switzerland	
IV	2026 (postponed from 2022) (Note: The 2022 Summer Youth Olympics were postponed to 2026 due to the operational and economical consequences of the postponement of the 2020 Summer Olympics to July 2021 due to the COVID-19 pandemic.)	Dakar	Senegal	Awarded to host the IV Summer Youth Olympic Games (unanimous vote)	8 October 2018	133rd in Buenos Aires, Argentina	(Note: The IOC Executive Board presented to the IOC session a proposal that the African continent will be a strong priority to host the 2022 Summer Youth Olympics. The session confirmed the change of date back to 2022, after Agenda 2020 had previously suggested changing it to 2023.)
IV	2026 (postponed from 2022)	Abuja	Nigeria	Not invited to the candidature stage	8 October 2018	133rd in Buenos Aires, Argentina	(Note: The IOC Executive Board presented to the IOC session a proposal that the African continent will be a strong priority to host the 2022 Summer Youth Olympics. The session confirmed the change of date back to 2022, after Agenda 2020 had previously suggested changing it to 2023.)
IV	2026 (postponed from 2022)	Gaborone	Botswana	Not invited to the candidature stage	8 October 2018	133rd in Buenos Aires, Argentina	(Note: The IOC Executive Board presented to the IOC session a proposal that the African continent will be a strong priority to host the 2022 Summer Youth Olympics. The session confirmed the change of date back to 2022, after Agenda 2020 had previously suggested changing it to 2023.)
IV	2026 (postponed from 2022)	Tunis	Tunisia	Not invited to the candidature stage	8 October 2018	133rd in Buenos Aires, Argentina	(Note: The IOC Executive Board presented to the IOC session a proposal that the African continent will be a strong priority to host the 2022 Summer Youth Olympics. The session confirmed the change of date back to 2022, after Agenda 2020 had previously suggested changing it to 2023.)
V	2030	Asunción	Paraguay	In preferred host phase	June 2026	146th in Lausanne, Switzerland	
V	2030	Bangkok	Thailand	In preferred host phase	June 2026	146th in Lausanne, Switzerland	
V	2030	Santiago	Chile	In preferred host phase	June 2026	146th in Lausanne, Switzerland	

== Winter Youth Olympic Games ==
The following is a list of bids for the Winter Youth Olympics, sorted by year. It consists of the year the games were held or scheduled to be held, the date the decision was made, the city and country which issued the bid, and the result of the bid parties. The bid listed first for each Games is the one selected by the IOC.

Games	Year	Bid party		Result	Final selection process		Note
Games	Year	City	NOCs	Result	Date	IOC Session	Note
I	2012	Innsbruck	Austria	Awarded to host the I Winter Youth Olympic Games (84 votes)	12 December 2008	None, Postal vote	
I	2012	Kuopio	Finland	Eliminated in the first voting (15 votes)	12 December 2008	None, Postal vote	
I	2012	Harbin	China	Not shortlisted to the final candidature stage	12 December 2008	None, Postal vote	
I	2012	Lillehammer	Norway	Not shortlisted to the final candidature stage	12 December 2008	None, Postal vote	
II	2016	Lillehammer	Norway	Awarded to host the II Winter Youth Olympic Games (sole bid)	7 December 2011	None, Postal vote	
III	2020	Lausanne	Switzerland	Awarded to host the III Winter Youth Olympic Games (71 votes)	31 July 2015	128th in Kuala Lumpur, Malaysia	
III	2020	Brașov	Romania	Eliminated in the first voting (10 votes)	31 July 2015	128th in Kuala Lumpur, Malaysia	
IV	2024	Gangwon	South Korea	Awarded to host the IV Winter Youth Olympic Games (79 votes)	10 January 2020	135th in Lausanne, Switzerland	
IV	2024	Brașov	Romania	Did not advance to targeted dialogue phase	10 January 2020	135th in Lausanne, Switzerland	
IV	2024	Sofia	Bulgaria	Did not advance to targeted dialogue phase	10 January 2020	135th in Lausanne, Switzerland	
IV	2024	Ushuaia	Argentina	Did not advance to targeted dialogue phase	10 January 2020	135th in Lausanne, Switzerland	
IV	2024	Harbin or Changchun	China	Did not advance to targeted dialogue phase	10 January 2020	135th in Lausanne, Switzerland	
IV	2024	Sochi	Russia	Rejected	10 January 2020	135th in Lausanne, Switzerland	
V	2028	Dolomiti and Valtellina	Italy	Awarded to host the V Winter Youth Olympic Games (89 votes)	30 January 2025	143rd in Lausanne, Switzerland	

== Bidding cities ==
The following is a list of bids submitted by city. It lists the national Olympic committee, the city, and the games for which failed, and successful bid were submitted.

City	Summer Youth Olympic Games	Winter Youth Olympic Games	Total
(Argentina) Buenos Aires	1 (2018)		1 (1)
(Argentina) Ushuaia		1 (2024)	1 (0)
(Austria) Innsbruck		1 (2012)	1 (1)
(Botswana) Gaborone	1 (2026)		1 (0)
(Bulgaria) Sofia		1 (2024)	1 (0)
(Chile) Santiago	1 (2030)		1 (0)
(China) Harbin		2 (2012, 2024)	2 (0)
(China) Nanjing	1 (2014)		1 (1)
(Colombia) Medellín	1 (2018,)		1 (0)
(Finland) Kuopio		1 (2012)	1 (0)
(United Kingdom) Glasgow	1 (2018)		1 (0)
(Greece) Athens	1 (2010)		1 (0)
Guatemala City	1 (2010)		1 (0)
(Hungary) Debrecen	1 (2010)		1 (0)
(Italy) Dolomiti Valtellina		1 (2028)	1 (1)
(Italy) Turin	1 (2010)		1 (0)
(Malaysia) Kuala Lumpur	1 (2010)		1 (0)
(Mexico) Guadalajara	1 (2014)		1 (0)
(Netherlands) Rotterdam	1 (2018)		1 (0)
(Nigeria) Abuja	1 (2026)		1 (0)
(Norway) Lillehammer		2 (2012, 2016)	2 (1)
(Paraguay) Asunción	1(2030)		1 (0)
(Poland) Poznań	3 (2010, 2014, 2018)		3 (0)
(Romania) Brașov		2 (2020, 2024)	2 (0)
(Russia) Moscow	1 (2010)		1 (0)
(Russia) Sochi		1 (2024)	1 (0)
Singapore	1 (2010)		1 (1)
(Senegal) Dakar	1 (2026)		1 (1)
(South Korea) Gangwon		1 (2024)	1 (1)
(Switzerland) Lausanne		1 (2020)	1 (1)
(Thailand) Bangkok	2 (2010, 2030)		2 (0)
(Tunisia) Tunis	1 (2026)		1 (0)
