= Venues of the 2016 Winter Youth Olympics =

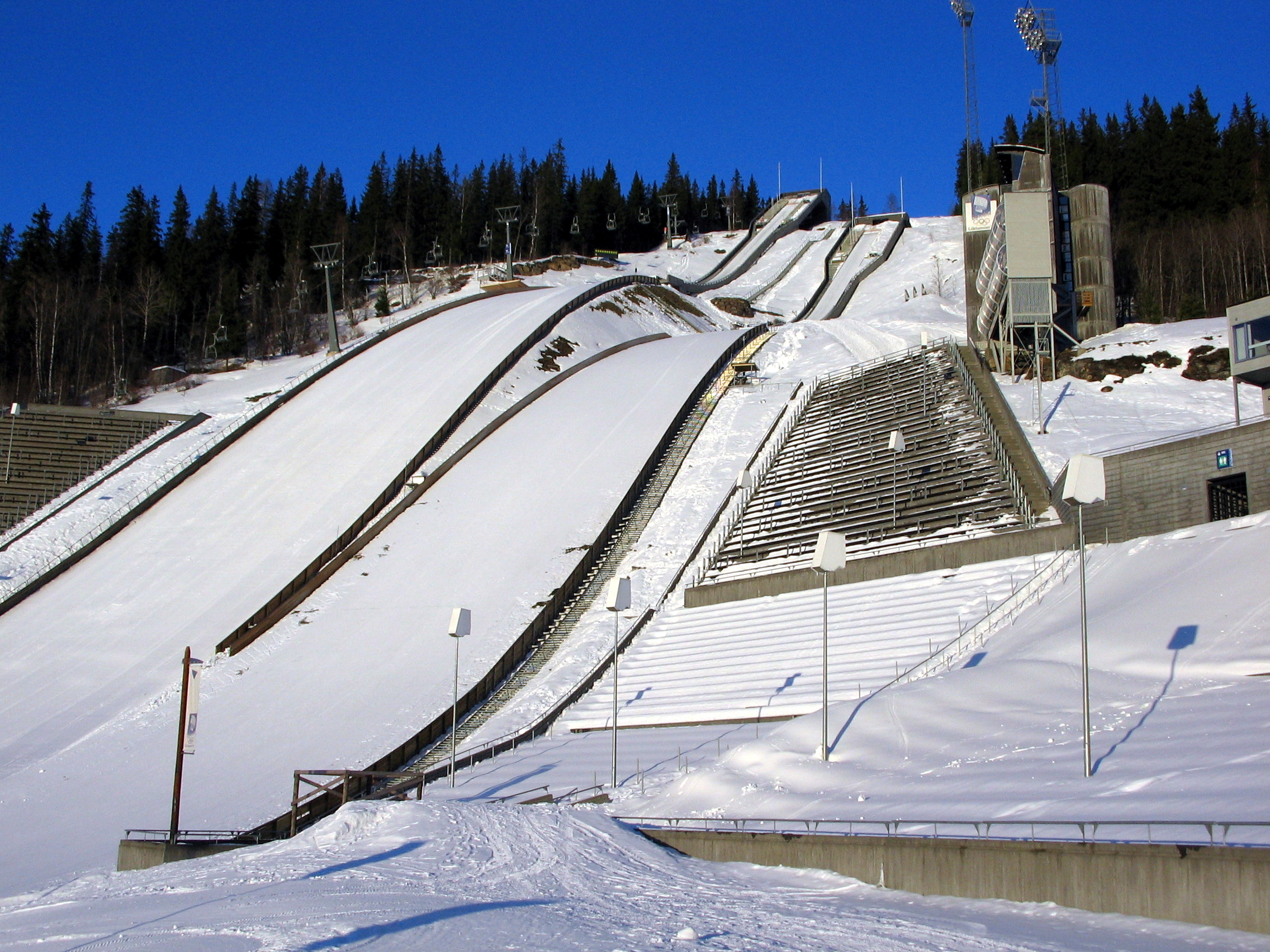
Lysgårdsbakken host the ski jumping events

The 2016 Winter Youth Olympics in and around Lillehammer, Norway, between 12 February and 21 February 2016. Nine competition and twelve non-competition venues are to be used; all except the Youth Olympic Village in Lillehammer and a training ice rink being are existing venues. All the competition venues and some of the non-competition venues were built ahead of the 1994 Winter Olympics. The games be held in four municipalities: Lillehammer, Hamar, Gjøvik and Øyer.

Lillehammer has five competition venues, Birkebeineren Ski Stadium, Kristins Hall, Kanthaugen Freestyle Arena, Lillehammer Olympic Bobsleigh and Luge Track and the Lysgårdsbakken ski jumping hill. In addition, the Olympic Village, the ceremonies stadium Stampesletta, the media center and various cultural venues, such as Lillehammer Art Museum and Maihaugen, are located in Lillehammer. Two skating halls, Hamar Olympic Amphitheatre and Vikingskipet, are located in Hamar, along with a hotel used as a sub-site Olympic Village. Alpine skiing take place at Hafjell in Øyer and short-track speed skating take place at Gjøvik Olympic Cavern Hall.

== Background ==
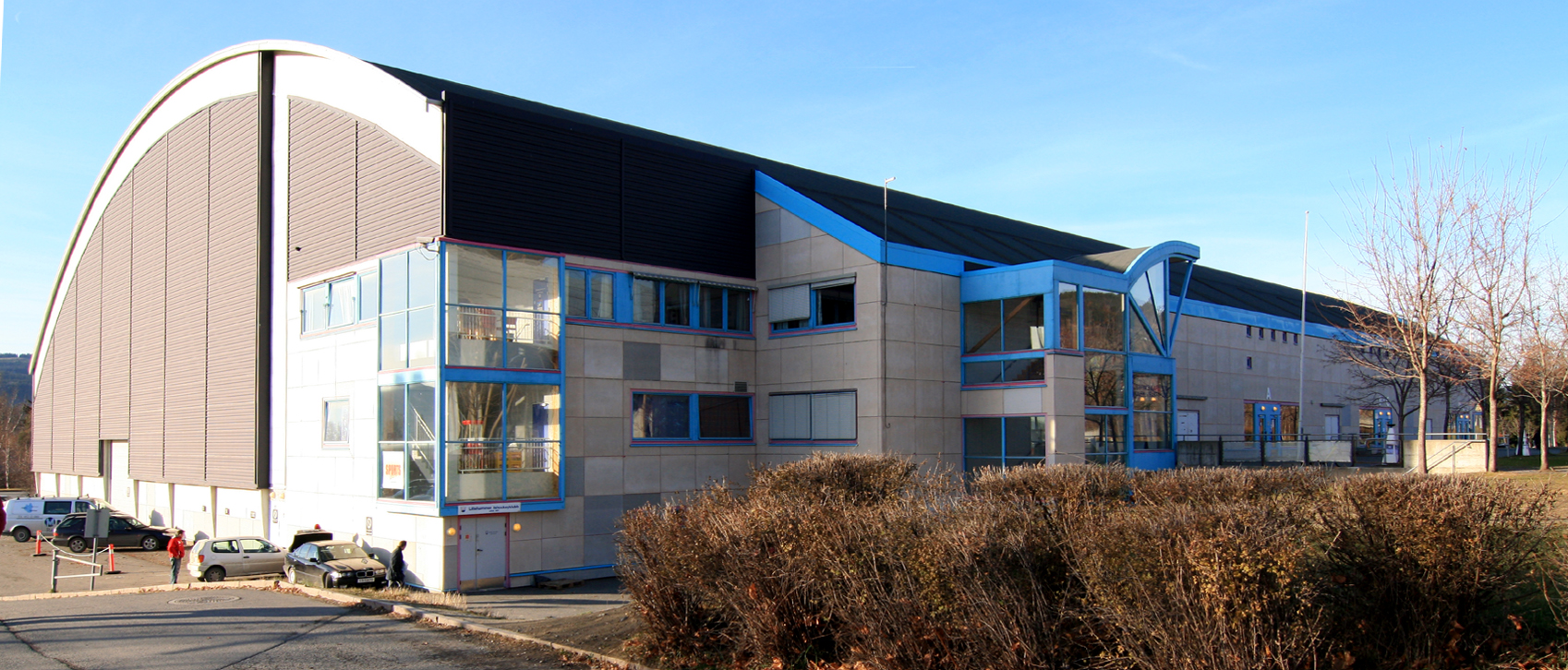
Kristins Hall will host ice hockey and curling

Originally proposed in 1981, Lillehammer's bid for the 1992 Winter Olympics was unsuccessful and lost to Albertville, France. Lillehammer then made a new bid for the 1994 Olympics, which it won on 15 September 1988. Venue construction ran from spring 1990 to December 1993, with all the competition and most of the non-competition venues purpose-built for the games. For the first time in Olympic history, environmental and sustainability issues were considered in venue construction.

Two venues, Kristins Hall and Hafjell, were built before Lillehammer had been awarded the Olympics, although the former was only used for training during the Olympics. Lillehammer's incumbent ski jumping hill, Balbergbakken, was found to be unsuitable and Lysgårdsbakken was built instead. In the bid, the speed skating events were to be held at Stampesletta, an outdoor track and field stadium in Lillehammer. Only after Lillehammer had been awarded the 1994 Winter Olympics was it decided that an indoor venue would have to be built for the games. This started a debate about the location of the various ice rinks and resulted in the neighboring towns of Hamar and Gjøvik also receiving venues.

Lillehammer failed at its bid to host the 2012 Winter Youth Olympics, losing to Innsbruck, Austria, but was awarded the 2016 edition as the only bidder. The bid was based on reuse of the heritage and venues from the 1994 Olympics. Beyond the construction of an Olympic Village, the only major upgrade to the venues is the addition of a curling rink in Kristins Hall.

== Competition venues ==
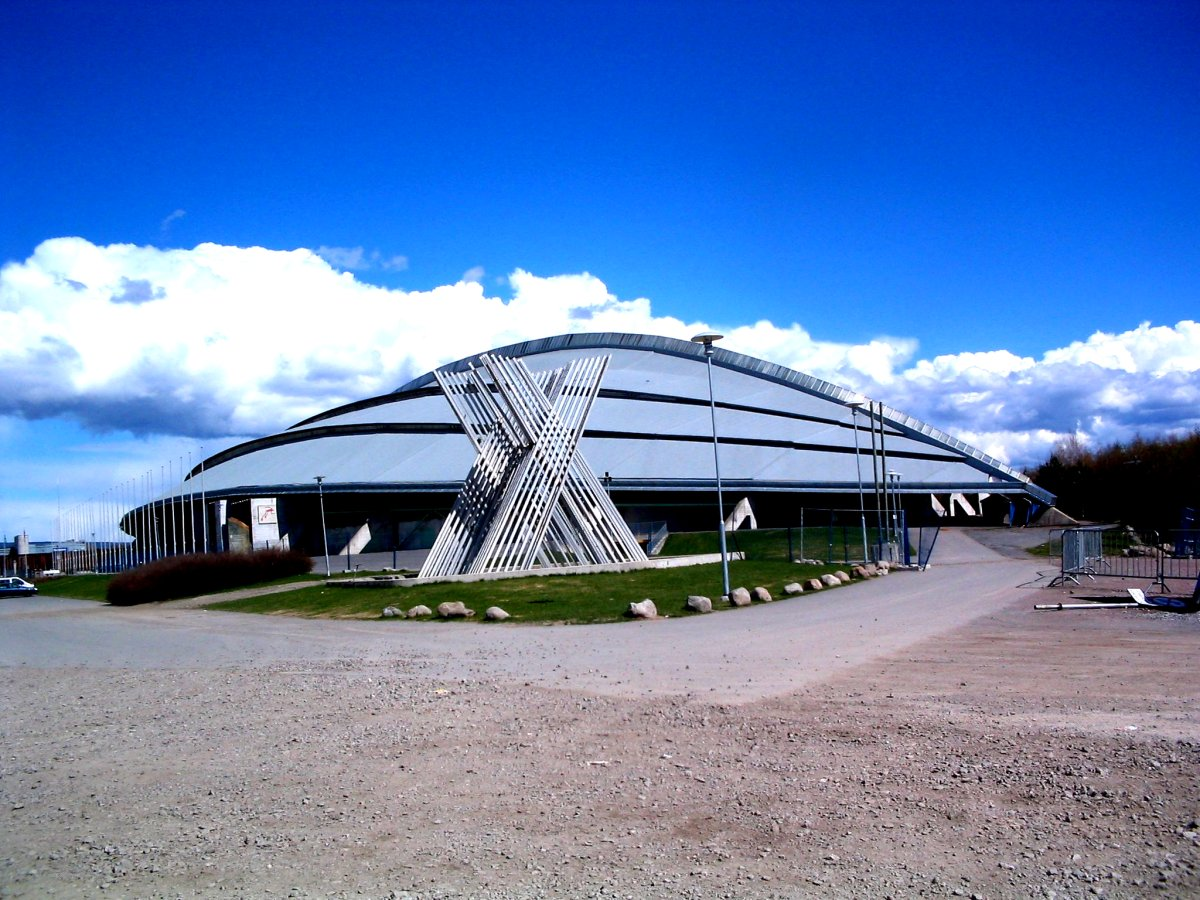
Vikingskipet will host speed skating events

In Lillehammer, the twin ski jumping hill of Lysgårdsbakken has a spectator capacity of 35,000. The large hill has a hill size of 138 and a K-point of 120, while the normal hill has a hill size of 100 and a K-point of 90. Birkebeineren Ski Stadium will host cross-country skiing, biathlon and Nordic combined. The stadium has a capacity for 31,000 spectators during cross-country skiing and 13,500 during biathlon. Spectators can also watch from along the tracks. Kanthaugen Freestyle Arena has a capacity for 15,000 spectators and will host freestyle skiing and half-pipe snowboarding.

Lillehammer Olympic Bobsleigh and Luge Track is located at Hunderfossen and is the only bobsleigh, luge and skeleton track in the Nordic countries. Kristins Hall will host ice hockey and curling. Gjøvik Olympic Cavern Hall is located in a man-made cave and will feature the short-track speed skating events. In Hamar, Vikingskipet will host long track speed skating and Hamar Olympic Amphitheatre will host figure skating. Alpine skiing and slopestyle snowboarding will take place at Hafjell in Øyer.

All the competition venues were built ahead of the 1994 Winter Olympics. Kristins Hall was the only venue not used during those games, while Håkons Hall and Kvitfjell were used, but will not be used for the Youth Olympics. The area has hosted world cup or world championship-level competitions in the majority of the events since the 1994 Olympics. The main international access point to the games is Oslo Airport, Gardermoen, located 145 kilometers (90 mi) south of Lillehammer. It is connected to Lillehammer via the Dovre Line and European Road E6.

The following list contains the nine venues scheduled to be used during the 2016 Winter Youth Olympics. They are listed by their name, as well as containing the sports held at the venue, the municipality where they are located and the spectator capacity.

List of competition venues
Venue	Sport(s)	Location	Capacity	Ref(s)
Birkebeineren Ski Stadium	Biathlon, cross-country skiing, Nordic combined (cross-country skiing)	Lillehammer	34,000	
Gjøvik Olympic Cavern Hall	Short-track speed skating	Gjøvik	6,000	
Kristins Hall	Ice hockey, curling	Lillehammer	3,197	
Hafjell	Alpine skiing, snowboarding (slopestyle)	Øyer	30,000	
Hamar Olympic Amphitheatre	Figure skating	Hamar	6,000	
Kanthaugen Freestyle Arena	Freestyle skiing, snowboarding (half-pipe)	Lillehammer	15,000	
Lillehammer Olympic Bobsleigh and Luge Track	Bobsleigh, luge, skeleton	Lillehammer	10,000	
Lysgårdsbakken	Nordic combined (ski jumping), ski jumping, Opening ceremony	Lillehammer	35,000	
Vikingskipet	Speed skating	Hamar	10,600	

== Non-competition venues ==
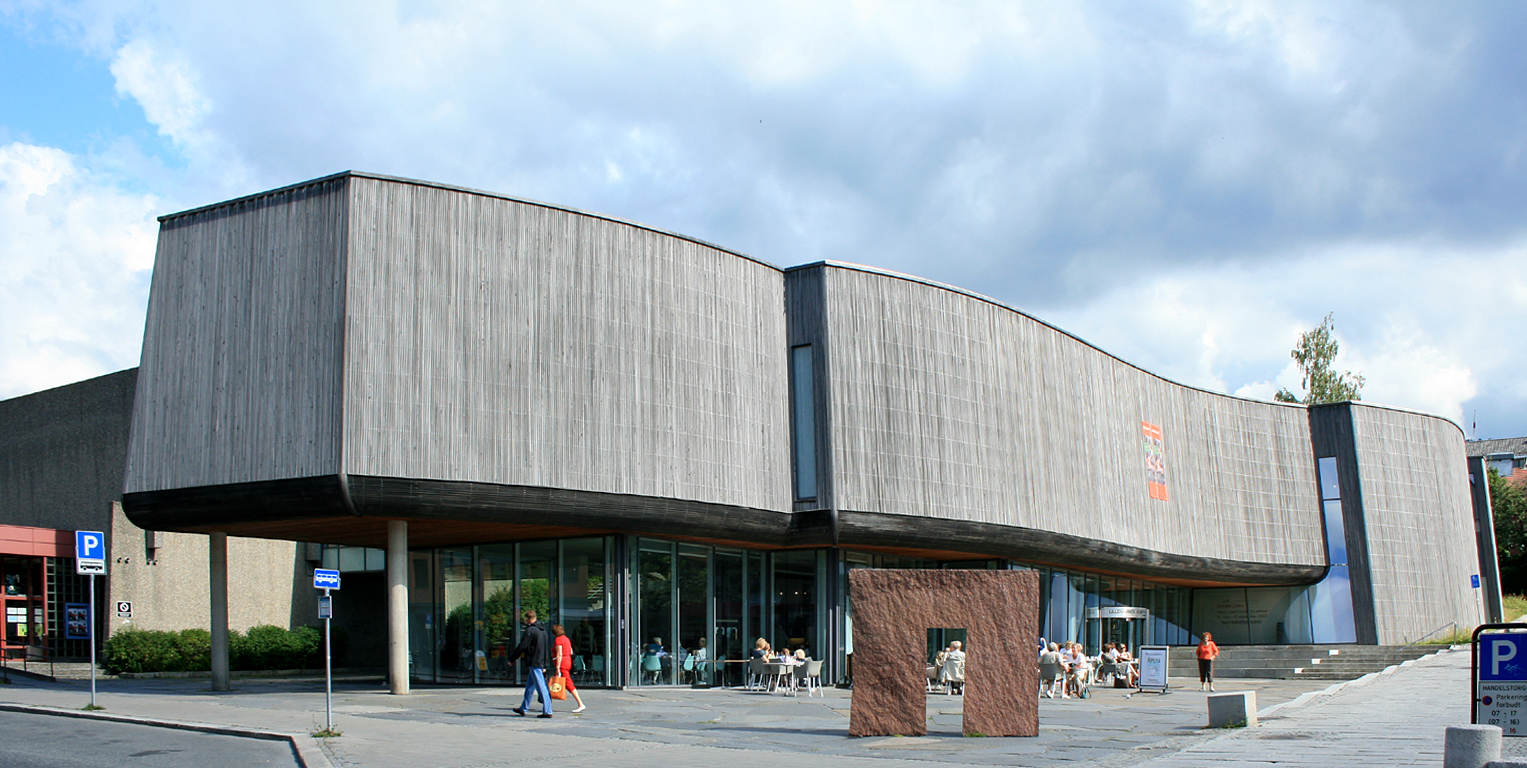
Lillehammer Art Museum is one of the cultural venues

Stampesletta, a multi-sports complex next to Kristins Hall, will host the opening and closing ceremonies. The medal ceremonies will take place in the town plaza. There are five designated cultural venues in Lillehammer: Kulturhuset Banken, Lillehammer Art Museum, Lillehammer University College, Maihaugen and the Nansen Academy. The Main Media Centre will be located at Mesna Upper Secondary School, which is adjacent to Stampesletta.

Athlete and leader accommodation will be provided at two Olympic Villages, one in Lillehammer for the Lillehammer and Øyer-based events, and one in Hamar for the Hamar and Gjøvik-based events. The Olympic Village in Hamar will make use of the 239-room Hotel Scandic Hamar, located between the two venues. It will serve as a village for all skating sports (long-track, short-track and figure), which take place in Hamar and Gjøvik. Travel distance from Hamar to Gjøvik is 50 kilometers (30 mi).

The Youth Olympic Village in Lillehammer will be the only facilities of any size constructed for the Youth Olympics and is located at Stampesletta, 600 meters (2,000 ft) from the town center. This allows the village to be within walking distance from three of the competition venues: Kristins Hall, Lysgårdsbakken and Kanthaugen. The village will consist of the existing Birkebeineren Hotel & Apartments plus new residential buildings. The complex will have 1,786 beds. Dining will take place at Håkons Hall. Construction of the new residential areas are the responsibility of the Student Welfare Organisation in Oppland and Lillehammer Cooperative Housing Association. Travel distance to the event venues ranges from walking distance to 18 kilometers (11 mi).

The following list contains the twelve non-competition venues scheduled to be used during the 2016 Winter Youth Olympics. They are listed with their function, location and capacity.

List of non-competition venues
Venue	Type	Location	Capacity	Ref
Håkons Hall	Dining, Closing ceremony	Lillehammer	11,500	
Hotel Scandic Hamar	Athlete accommodation	Hamar	—	
Ice hockey rink	Training	Lillehammer	—	
Kulturhuset Banken	Culture	Lillehammer	—	
Lillehammer University College	Culture	Lillehammer	—	
Lillehammer Art Museum	Culture	Lillehammer	—	
Maihaugen	Culture	Lillehammer	750	
Mesna Upper Secondary School	Media	Lillehammer	—	
Nansen Academy	Culture	Lillehammer	—	
Town plaza	Medal ceremonies	Lillehammer	—	
Youth Olympic Village in Lillehammer	Athlete accommodation	Lillehammer	1,786	

== Bibliography ==
- Norwegian Olympic and Paralympic Committee and Confederation of Sports (NIF). "Candidate city for the Winter Youth Olympic Games: Lillehammer 2016" (PDF). Archived from the original (PDF) on 22 July 2011.
- International Olympic Committee (IOC) (November 2011). "2nd Winter Youth Olympic Games in 2016: Report of the IOC Evaluation Commission" (PDF). Archived (PDF) from the original on 11 March 2012.
- Lillehammer Olympic Organizing Committee (LOOC). "1994 Winter Olympics Report, volume I" (PDF). Archived from the original (PDF) on 2 December 2010.
- Lillehammer Olympic Organizing Committee (LOOC). "1994 Winter Olympics Report, volume III" (PDF). Archived from the original (PDF) on 8 July 2011.
- Hove-Ødegård, Arne; Celius, Sten; Brun, Ivar Ole (2004). "An Olympic Fairy Tale". Lillehammer Municipality. Archived from the original on 12 December 2010.
