= Bids for the 2022 Summer Youth Olympics =

Aspect of the Summer Youth Olympics

Overview
- Games of the IV Youth Olympiad
- Winner: Dakar

Details
- Committee: IOC

Map of the bidding cities

Important dates
- Bid: 6 February 2018
- Shortlist: 7 September 2018
- Decision: 8 October 2018

Decision
- Winner: Dakar
- Runner-up

There were a total of four bids which were initially submitted for the 2022 Summer Youth Olympics. In September 2018, the International Olympic Committee agreed to award the 2022 Summer Youth Olympics to the city of Dakar in Senegal.

Dakar were officially awarded the Games at the 133rd IOC Session in Buenos Aires, Argentina, on 8 October 2018. However, due to the COVID-19 pandemic, which resulted in the postponement of the 2020 Summer Olympics and Paralympics in Tokyo to 2021, the 2022 games were cancelled, and Dakar will instead host in 2026.

== Bidding calendar ==
The IOC revealed the 2022 Summer Youth Olympics bid process on 29 March 2018.

=== Preparation stage ===
- Briefings via video conference/conference call (28–29 March 2018)

=== Dialogue stage ===
- Deadline for signing Cooperation Agreement (13 April 2018)
- Deadline for Interested parties to respond to first information collection request (27 April 2018)
- IOC completes visit to each Interested party (May 2018)
- Feasibility report (June 2018)
- IOC issues invitations to become candidate cities (July 2018)

=== Candidature stage ===
- Visits to the candidate cities and working sessions (July – August 2018)
- IOC creates Outline Plan working with each Candidate party (August 2018)
- Deadline for each candidate city to respond to information collection request (August 2018)
- Follow-up discussions with each candidate city via individual teleconference (August 2018)
- Evaluation Commission meeting (September 2018)
- Evaluation Commission report (September 2018)
- Election of the Host at the 133rd Session of the IOC and signature of the Host Contract (8 October 2018)

=== Final selection process ===
The IOC voted to select the host city of the 2022 Summer Youth Olympics on 8 October 2018 at the 133rd IOC Session in Buenos Aires, Argentina.

2022 Youth Olympic Games bidding results
City	Nation	Votes
Dakar	Senegal	unanimous

== Candidate cities ==
=== Cities in preparation stage ===
The following four cities have been participating in the preparation stage and joined the briefings via videoconference/conference call.

- Dakar, Senegal
- ~~Gaborone, Botswana~~ (was not invited to candidature stage on 7 September 2018)
- ~~Abuja, Nigeria~~ (was not invited to candidature stage on 7 September 2018)
- ~~Tunis, Tunisia~~ (was not invited to candidature stage on 7 September 2018)

=== City in candidature stage ===
City	Country	National Olympic Committee	Result
Dakar	Senegal	Senegalese National Olympic and Sports Committee (CNOSS)	Winner
On 6 February 2018, Senegal declared its interest to host these games. Senegal's Olympic and Sport Committee President Mamadou Ndiaye said that “we have recently renovated or built a lot of sports facilities and infrastructure.” On 7 September 2018, the IOC's executive board announced that Dakar's bid would be the only bid that would advance to the October vote, effectively making Dakar the host of the 2022 Summer Youth Olympics. President Thomas Bach announced that the IOC was interested in bringing the Summer Youth Olympics to Dakar.

=== Withdrawn from preparation stage ===
City	Country	National Olympic Committee	Withdrawn Date
Gaborone	Botswana	Botswana National Olympic Committee (BNOC)	7 September 2018
After hosting the 2014 African Youth Games in the capital and largest city of Botswana, the country's National Olympic Committee had in mind to bid for other competitions such as the African Championships in Athletics, African Swimming Championships and the 2023 Summer Youth Olympics. Lassana Palenfo, president of ANOCA, had suggested a joint-African bid that includes South Africa, Botswana and Angola. In February, 2018 IOC President Thomas Bach stated that the Executive Board "wants the Summer Youth Olympic Games 2022 to take place in Africa" and that it has been decided to propose African continent a strong priority for the host.

== Previously interested in bidding ==
The following cities initially explored the possibility of bidding but decided not to proceed to the preparation stage.

=== Americas ===
- Monterrey, Mexico

In April 2016 the Monterrey City Olympic Foundation announced that the Mexican city will not be bidding for the 2023 Youth Olympic Games as had been originally planned. Monterrey bid for the 2014 Summer Youth Olympics and 2018 but both times the Mexican Olympic Committee chose Guadalajara as a candidate.

- New York City, United States

=== Asia ===
- Hong Kong, China

In 2015 Pang Chung, former secretary general of the Hong Kong Sports Federation & Olympic Committee (SF&OC) who is still an adviser to the body, stated that the 2023 Youth Olympics would be perfect for Hong Kong. He said that the 2009 East Asian Games showed the city can stage successful games and added: "If China wins the hosting rights for the 2022 Winter Olympics, we can also strengthen the impact of sport in the region by hosting the Youth Olympics the following year". Hong Kong has bid for the 2006 Asian Games and failed to become a candidate for the 2022 Asian Games after lawmakers voted it down in 2010. The city will also hosted the 2022 Gay Games, after previously hosted the 2019 Asian Deaf Games, which later cancelled due to many protests.

=== Europe ===
- Budapest, Hungary

Preliminary talks over potentially hosting the YOG between IOC members and officials from the city took place at the 131st IOC Session. Budapest bid to host the 2024 Summer Olympics but withdrew on March 1, 2017.

- Kazan, Russia

Tatarstan President Rustam Minnikhanov supported the proposal to hold the Youth Olympic Games in 2023 in Kazan. The meeting of the State Duma on physical culture, sports, tourism and youth affairs took place in the capital of the Republic of Tatarstan, also held the 2013 Summer Universiade.

- Munich, Germany

Die Linke party along with the Ecological Democratic Party (ODP) in Germany wrote a letter to Munich Mayor Dieter Reiter in February 2016 urging to investigate a possible bid for the Youth Olympic Games. Munich hosted the 1972 Summer Olympics.

- Rotterdam, Netherlands

The Board of Aldermen of Rotterdam planned to do a feasibility study to see if the city would bid for the 2023 Youth Olympic Games. André Bolhuis, President of the Netherlands Olympic Committee said, "we are pleased to have such an enthusiastic partner for this beautiful event as Rotterdam." Rotterdam bid for the 2018 Summer Youth Olympics but failed to become a candidate.
