= Lists of bids for the Olympic Games =

List of bids for the Olympic Games include:

- Bids for the Youth Olympic Games
- List of bids for the Summer Olympics
- List of bids for the Winter Olympics
