= International Broadcast Centre =

Media conference and control rooms during major sporting events

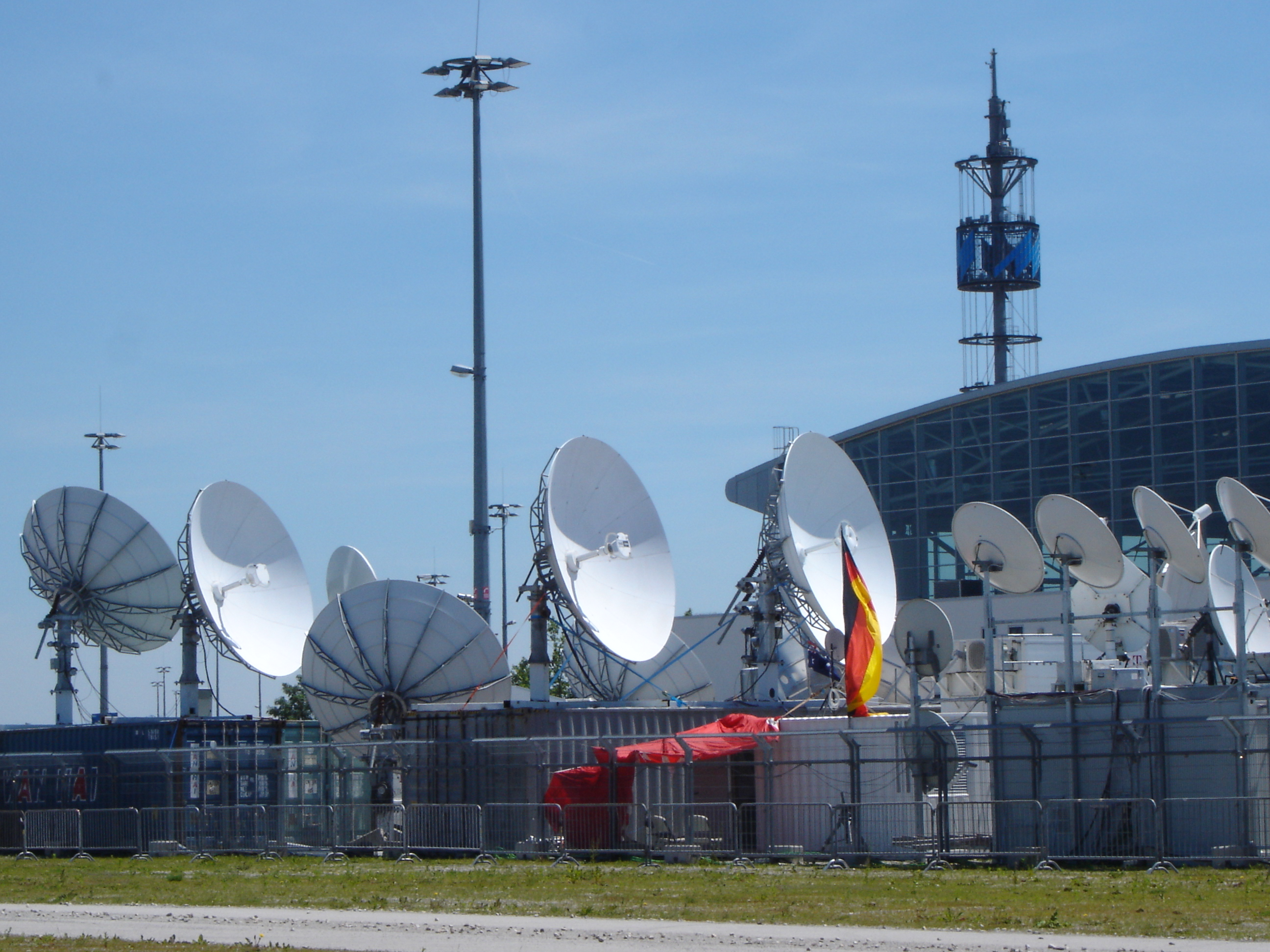
Satellite dish farm at the IBC in Munich during 2006 FIFA World Cup

The International Broadcast Centre (IBC) is a temporary hub for broadcasters during major sport events. It is also known as the International Press Center (IPC) or Main Press Center (MPC).

== FIFA World Cup ==
=== IBC/MPC host cities ===
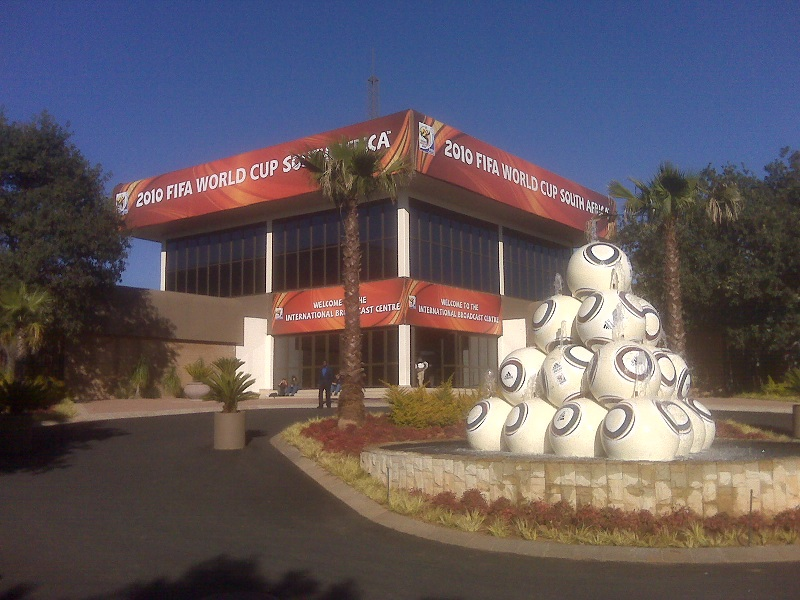
Entrance to the IBC at the 2010 FIFA World Cup.

- 1958: Sweden – Gothenburg
- 1962: Chile – Santiago
- 1966: England – London
- 1970: Mexico – Mexico City
- 1974: West Germany – Munich
- 1978: Argentina – Buenos Aires
- 1982: Spain – Madrid
- 1986: Mexico – Mexico City
- 1990: Italy – Rome
- 1994: United States – Dallas and Los Angeles
- 1998: France – Paris
- 2002:
  - South Korea – Seoul
  - Japan – Yokohama
- 2006: Germany – Munich
- 2010: South Africa – Johannesburg
- 2014: Brazil – Rio de Janeiro
- 2018: Russia – Moscow
- 2022: Qatar – Doha
- 2026: United States – Dallas
- 2030: Morocco – Casablanca
- 2034: Saudi Arabia – Riyadh

=== 2006 edition in Munich ===
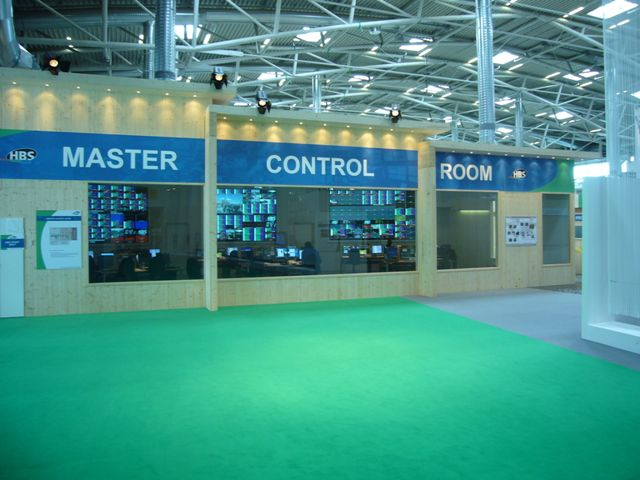
Master Control Room of the IBC

During the 2006 FIFA World Cup in Germany, the IBC in Munich was host to journalists from around 190 countries. The centre was based at the Munich Fairgrounds. The centre included 30,000 m^{2} (322,917 sq ft) of total space, 966 tonnes of fir wood and 22,500 m^{2} (242,188 sq ft) of wooden panels/walls, nearly 700 doors, fifteen television studios and was operational 24 hours a day, 7 days a week. The building is now known as the Munich Exhibition Centre. 120 television and radio channels had broadcast images and reports of the World Cup, from the centre to the 190 countries that they serve. Each channel had an allocated space on the floor, which were separated by wooden panels.

== FIFA Women's World Cup ==
=== IBC/MPC host cities ===
- 1991: China – Guangzhou
- 1995: Sweden – Stockholm
- 1999: United States – Los Angeles
- 2003: United States – Los Angeles
- 2007: China – Shanghai
- 2011: Germany – Frankfurt
- 2015: Canada – Vancouver
- 2019: France – Paris
- 2023: Australia – Sydney
- 2027: Brazil – Rio de Janeiro

== UEFA European Football Championship ==
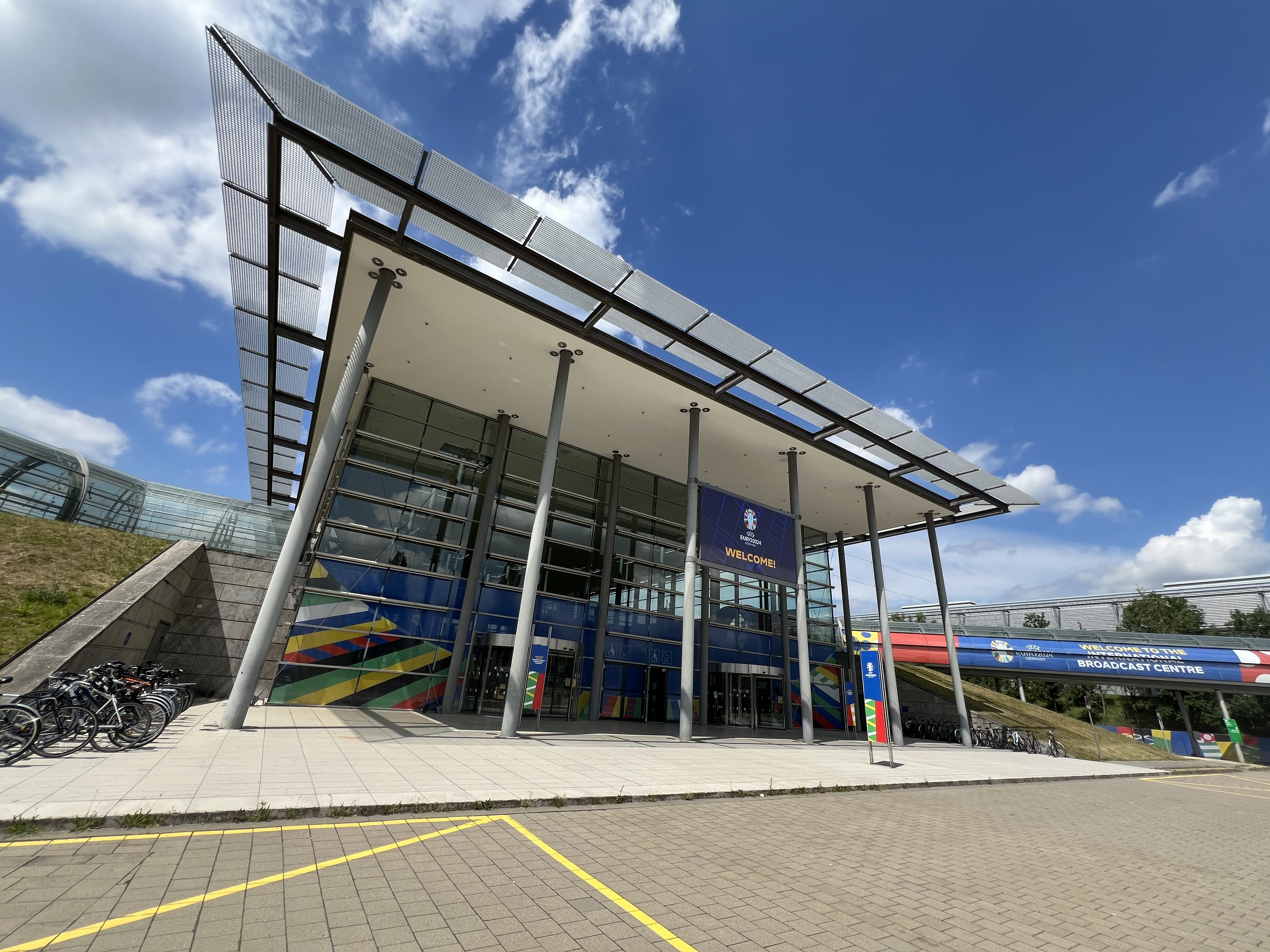
IBC at Leipzig Messe during UEFA Euro 2024

During the UEFA Euro 2016, in France, the IBC in Paris was host to journalists from around 190 countries. 120 television and radio channels had broadcast images and reports of the European Football Championship, from the centre to the 190 countries that they serve. Each channel had a space on the 30,000 square meter floor, separated by wooden panels.

=== IBC/MPC host cities ===
- 1996: England – London
- 2000: Netherlands – Amsterdam
- 2004: Portugal – Lisbon
- 2008: Austria – Vienna
- 2012: Poland – Warsaw
- 2016: France – Paris
- 2020: Netherlands – Vijfhuizen
- 2024: Germany – Leipzig
- 2028: England – London
- 2032: Italy – Milan

== Olympic Games ==
IBC Building in Athens

The section fronting the Olympic Stadium during the Games

The opposite side, fronting Kifissias Avenue, is now Golden Hall

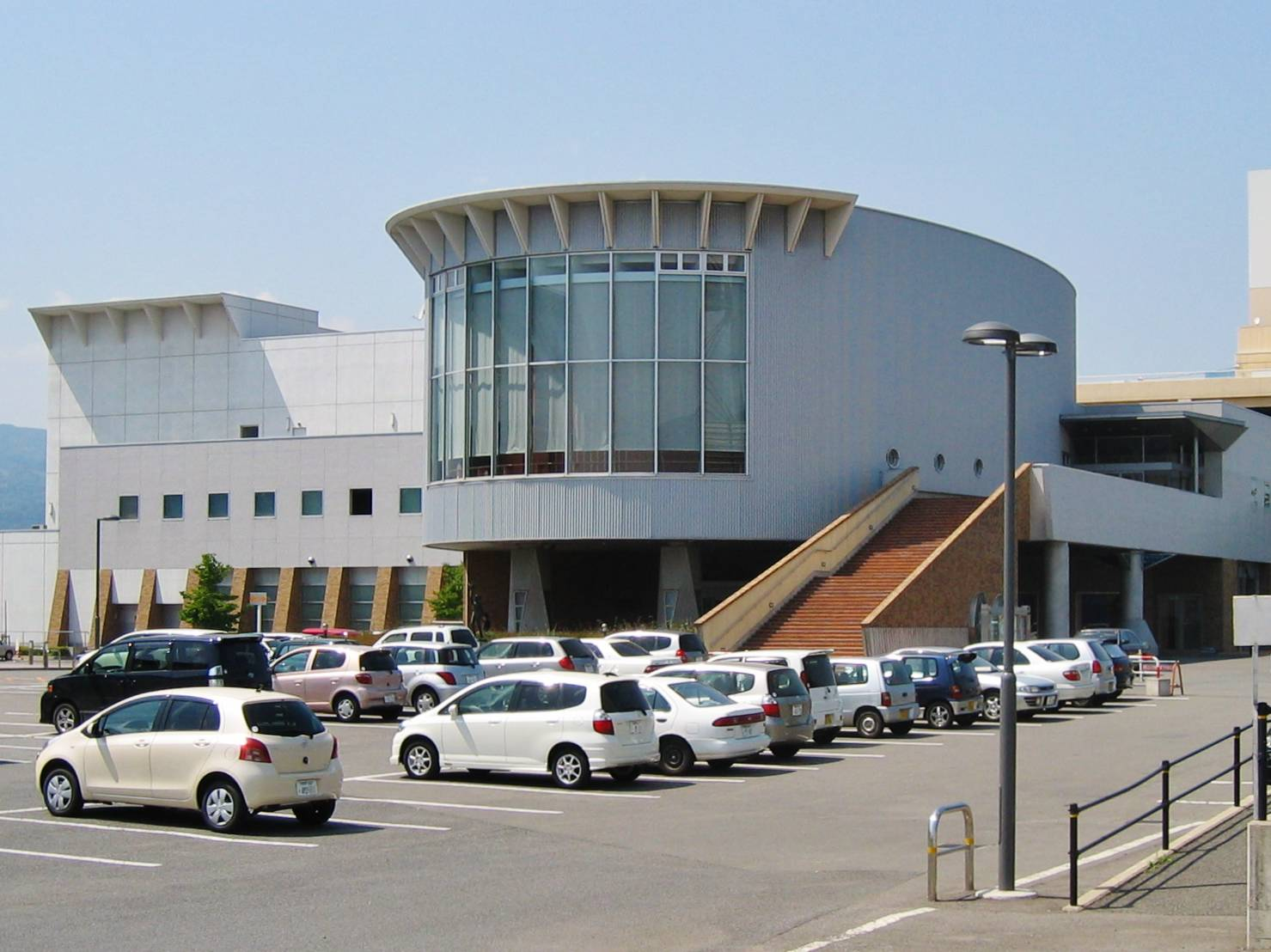
Wakasato Civic Cultural Hall in June 2006

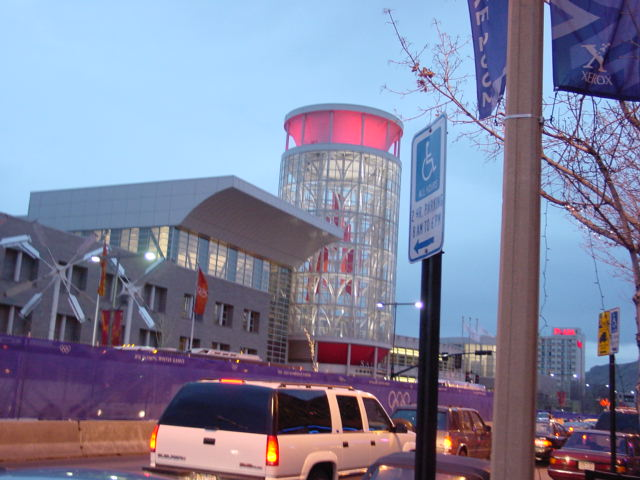
Salt Palace convention center during the 2002 Winter Olympics

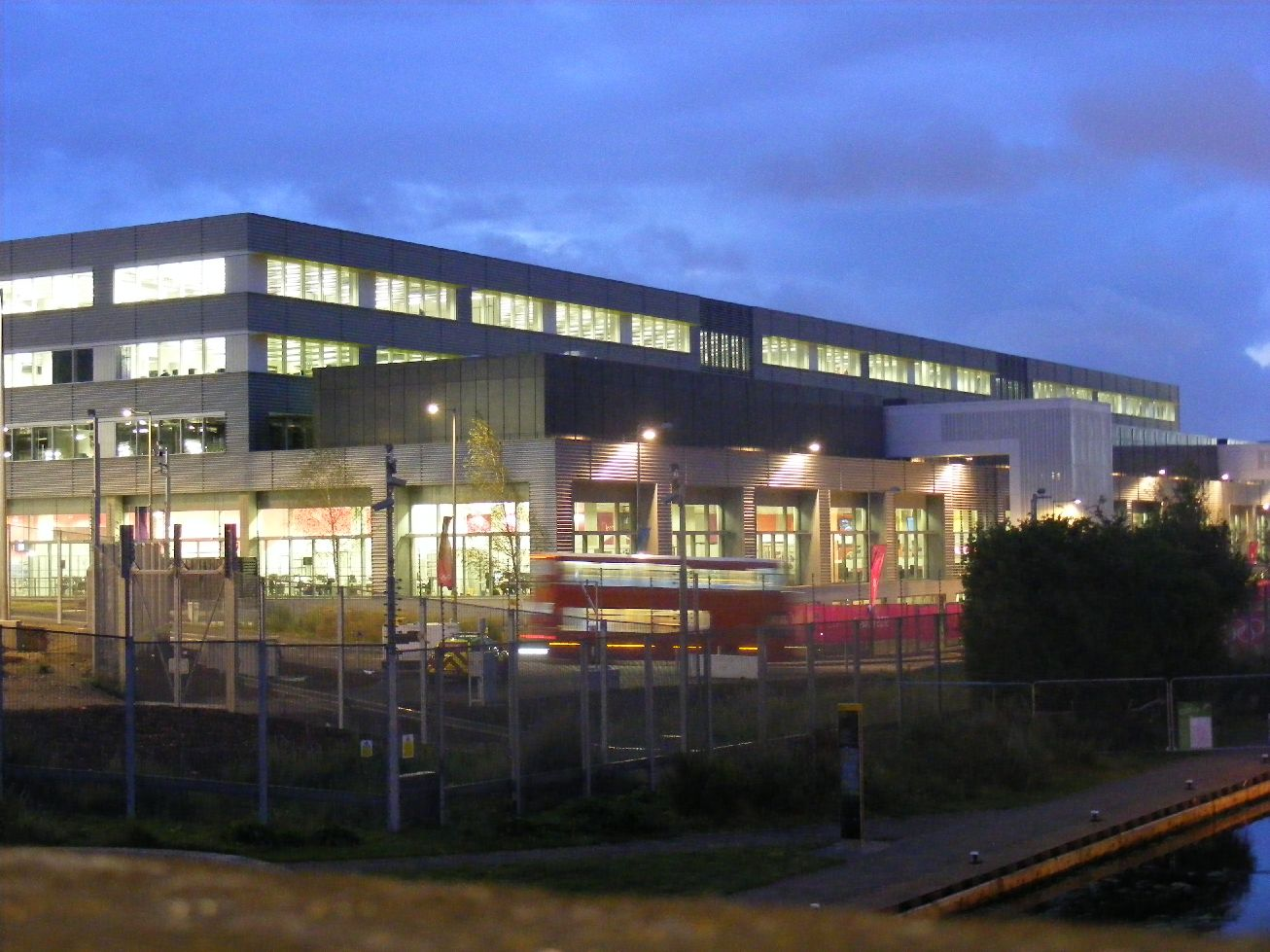
The IBC in Stratford, London, taken during the 2012 Summer Olympics

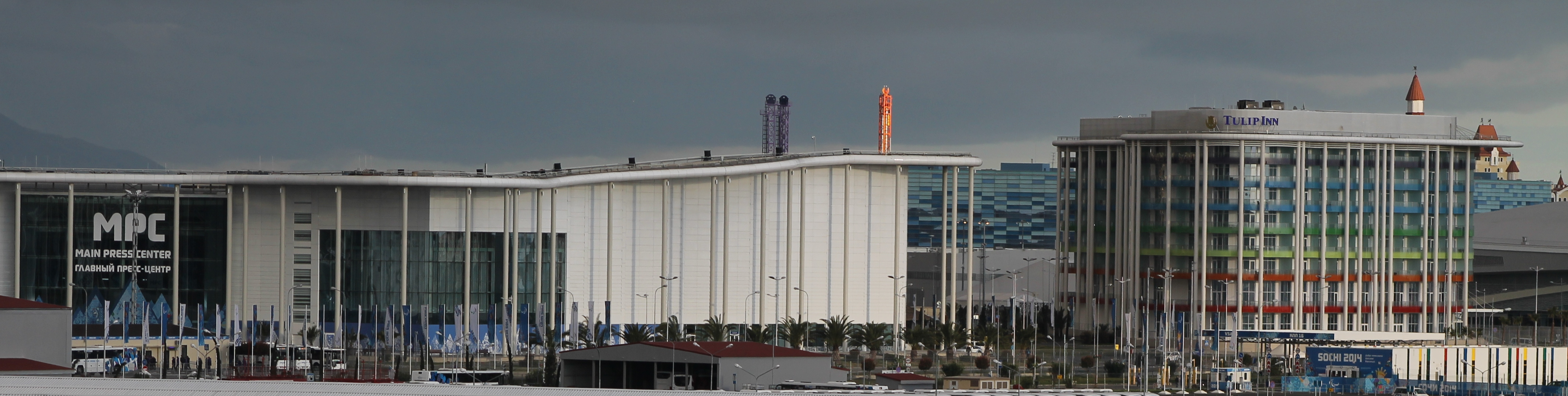
The Main Media Center in Sochi, which included the MPC and the IBC.

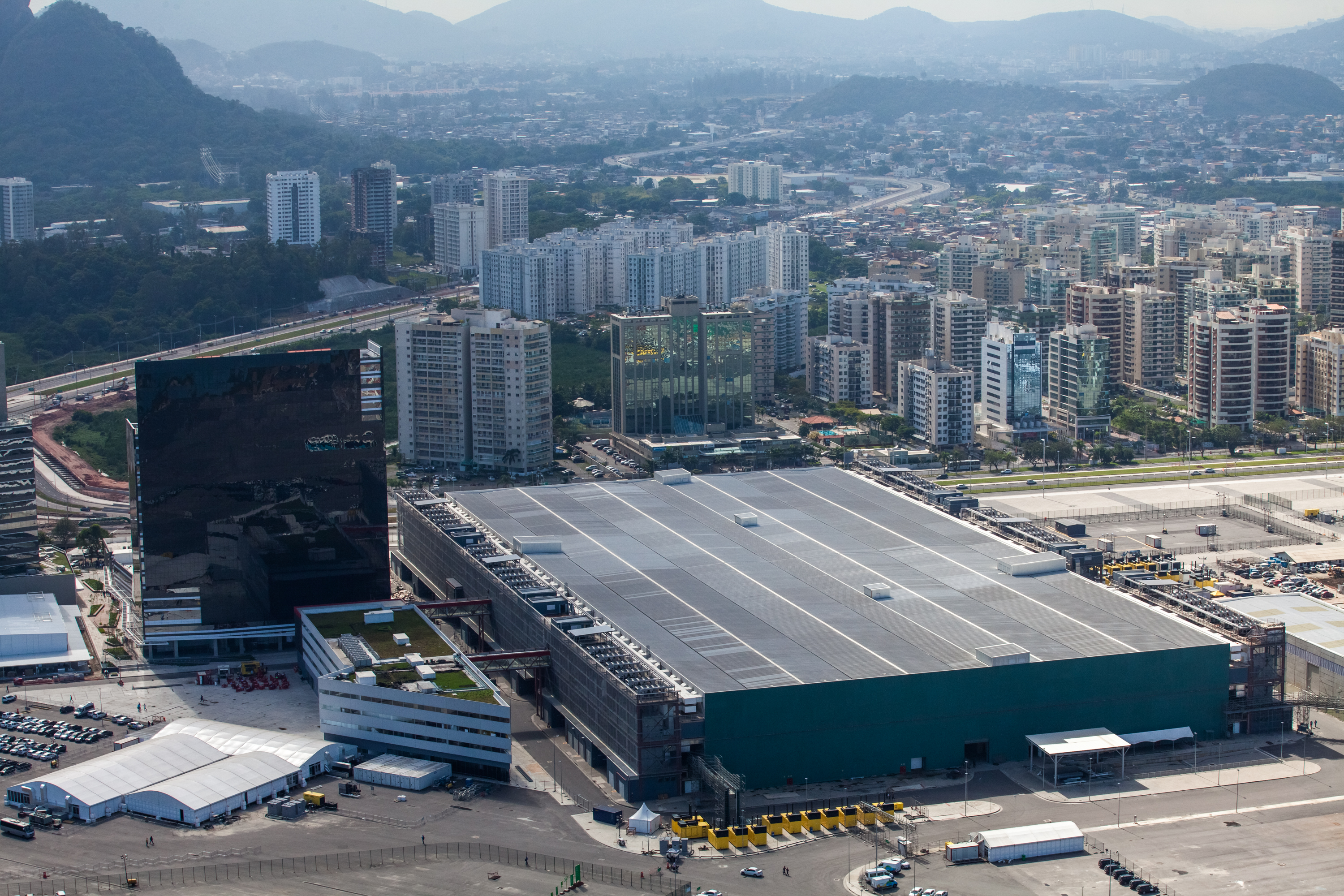
The MPC (left) in Rio de Janeiro is connected to the IBC building

An International Broadcast Centre is created at every Olympic Games. Broadcasters from around the world build studios in what is generally a large conference centre, such as the Georgia World Congress Center, which was used for the Atlanta Games. Olympic Broadcasting Services provides each of these rights-holders a video and audio feed from each venue, beauty shots from around the Olympic venues, transmission facilities, etc.

The inaugural IBC was created for the Tokyo 1964 Summer Olympics during the inaugural Olympics to be telecast internationally without the need for tapes to be flown overseas, as they had been for the 1960 Olympics four years earlier. These were also the first Olympic Games to have color telecasts, albeit partially.

Edition	City	Country	Venue or location
1964 Winter	Innsbruck	Austria	Innrain campus of the University of Innsbruck (MPC)
1964 Summer	Tokyo	Japan	NHK Broadcasting Center
1968 Winter	Grenoble	France	Malherbe apartment complex and various locations (Note: There were also smaller press centers in Le Stade de Glace in Grenoble, and at the five other venues in Autrans, Chamrousse, Alpe d'Huez, Saint-Nizier-du-Moucherotte, and Villard-de-Lans.)
1968 Summer	Mexico City	Mexico	National Autonomous University of Mexico
1972 Winter	Sapporo	Japan	Makomanai Park and Hokkaido Youth Hall (MPC)
1972 Summer	Munich	West Germany	Zentrale Hochschulsportanlage (IBC) and Olympia Pressestadt (MPC)
1976 Winter	Innsbruck	Austria	IVB Halle (IBC) and Pedagogical Academy Tyrol (MPC)
1976 Summer	Montreal	Canada	Cité du Havre (IBC) and Complexe Desjardins (MPC)
1980 Winter	Lake Placid	United States	Highway Dept. Garage
1980 Summer	Moscow	Soviet Union	Olympic TV and Radio Broadcasting Complex (OTRK) (IBC); Media headquarters at 4 Zubovsky Boulevard (MPC)
1984 Winter	Sarajevo	Yugoslavia	RTV Center (IBC); Youth Centre Skenderija (MPC)
1984 Summer	Los Angeles	United States	University of Southern California; Los Angeles Convention Center (MPC)
1988 Winter	Calgary	Canada	Big Four Building (Stampede Park)
1988 Summer	Seoul	South Korea	KBS Building
1992 Winter	Albertville	France	La Léchère (MPC) and Moûtiers (IBC)
1992 Summer	Barcelona	Spain	Fira de Barcelona pavilions in Montjuïc
1994 Winter	Lillehammer	Norway	Inland Norway University of Applied Sciences Campus
1996 Summer	Atlanta	United States	Georgia World Congress Center
1998 Winter	Nagano	Japan	Wakasato Civic Cultural Hall (MPC); A renovated former textile mill (IBC)
2000 Summer	Sydney	Australia	Sydney Olympic Park Pavilions
2002 Winter	Salt Lake City	United States	Salt Palace Convention Center
2004 Summer	Athens	Greece	Golden Hall at the Athens Olympic Sports Complex
2006 Winter	Turin	Italy	Lingotto Fiere Exhibition Centre
2008 Summer	Beijing	China	Olympic Green Convention Centre
2010 Winter	Vancouver	Canada	Vancouver Convention Centre (IBC) and Canada Place (MPC); Whistler Conference Centre (IBC/MPC)
2010 Summer (Youth)	Singapore	Singapore	Marina Bay Sands
2012 Winter (Youth)	Innsbruck	Austria	Innsbruck Exhibition Centre (IBC) and OlympiaWorld (MPC)
2012 Summer	London	United Kingdom	London Olympics Media Centre
2014 Winter	Sochi	Russia	Sochi Olympic Park
2014 Summer (Youth)	Nanjing	China	Nanjing Youth Olympic Sports Park
2016 Winter (Youth)	Lillehammer	Norway	Mesna Upper Secondary School
2016 Summer	Rio de Janeiro	Brazil	Barra Olympic Park
2018 Winter	Pyeongchang	South Korea	Alpensia Resort
2018 Summer (Youth)	Buenos Aires	Argentina	La Rural Convention Centre (IBC); Parque Olímpico de la Juventud (MPC)
2020 Winter (Youth)	Lausanne	Switzerland	Le Flon
2020 Summer	Tokyo	Japan	Tokyo Big Sight
2022 Winter	Beijing	China	China National Convention Center (MPC/IBC); Zhangjiakou Mountain Media Centre (IBC/MPC)
2024 Winter (Youth)	Gangwon	South Korea	E-Zen Experience Training Centre
2024 Summer	Paris	France	Hall 3 at Le Bourget Exhibition Centre (IBC); Palais des congrès de Paris (MPC)
2026 Winter	Milan	Italy	Fiera Milano Rho
2028 Summer	Los Angeles	United States	Warner Bros. Ranch Studio Lot (IBC); Hollywood Park Studios (MPC)
2030 Winter	TBD	France	TBD
2032 Summer	Brisbane	Australia	Visy Glass factory in West End (IBC); Brisbane Convention & Exhibition Centre (MPC)
2034 Winter	Salt Lake City	United States	Salt Palace Convention Center
