= Bids for the 2012 Winter Youth Olympics =

Overview
- I Winter Youth Olympic Games
- Winner: Innsbruck; Runner-up: Kuopio; Shortlist: Harbin · Lillehammer

Details
- Committee: IOC
- Election venue: Lausanne

Map of the bidding cities

Important dates
- Bid: June 19, 2008
- Shortlist: August 2008
- Decision: December 12, 2008

Decision
- Winner: Innsbruck (84 votes)
- Runner-up: Kuopio (15 votes)

The 2012 Winter Youth Olympics (YOG) were an international youth multi-sport event featuring winter events that was planned to complement the Olympic Games. It featured athletes between the ages of 14 and 18.

Four cities entered bids to host the games: Harbin (China), Innsbruck (Austria), Kuopio (Finland), and Lillehammer (Norway). All four cities were selected for the shortlist. As with the selection process for the 2010 Summer Youth Olympics, this list was further pared to two finalists one month prior to the selection date, Innsbruck and Kuopio. It was finally revealed on December 12, 2008, that Innsbruck won the rights to host the Games by a margin of 84 votes to 15.

== Result ==
The result, collected by postal vote was revealed by IOC president Jacques Rogge on December 12, 2008:

2012 Youth Winter Olympic Games bid results
City	NOC Name	Postal votes
Innsbruck	Austria	84
Kuopio	Finland	15

Rogge commented at the announcement, "this is a good decision in that it was obviously the best bid. Innsbruck has lots of assets - the capacity of the city, the experience of the people. It's an icon of winter sports. We are fully aware that this is a very short period, but we are extremely confident that Innsbruck can match the expectations of both the IOC and the athletes, including an attractive culture and education program which is an integral part of the Youth Olympic Games experience."

Rogge's comments indicated Austria's recent bid history may have also affected votes: "It's something nice for Austria. They bid twice for Salzburg and now they are getting Innsbruck. I think this is good."

== Games expectations ==
The winter version will last a maximum of nine days, with the first edition taking place in early 2012. The IOC expects around 970 athletes and 580 officials at the winter games. Estimated cost for the game are currently $15 million-$20 million. The IOC states the program will include the seven sports found in the program of the Sochi 2014 Winter Olympics. Similar to the Summer edition, a limited number of disciplines will be offered, and sports of particular interest to the youth will be included.

The Evaluation Commission evaluated bids primarily in the areas of governance and guarantees, finance, Olympic Village, sport and venues, and culture and education programs. As with the selection of the 2010 Summer Youth Olympics, special emphasis was put on delivering in the areas in a short three-year period; that is, a city that does not make the grade for this edition may still be a very viable candidate for a future edition with a longer lead time.

== Bid process ==
The schedule was announced in January, 2008.

- March 6, 2008—National Olympic Committees (NOCs) are to inform the IOC of the names of their candidate cities.
- June 19, 2008—Cities submit Candidature files.
- August 2008—IOC announces shortlist of Candidate Cities. Cities submit detailed budget.
- September 2008—Cities respond in writing to initial concerns. Cities present 1 hour video presentations and Question sessions. (No on-site tour was executed). Cities send in additional guarantees as needed.
- October 2008—The Evaluation Commission submits its report to the IOC Executive Board.
- November 2, 2008—The IOC Executive Board submit its recommendations to the IOC members for a postal vote.
- December 12, 2008—The host city is announced.

== Host city overview ==
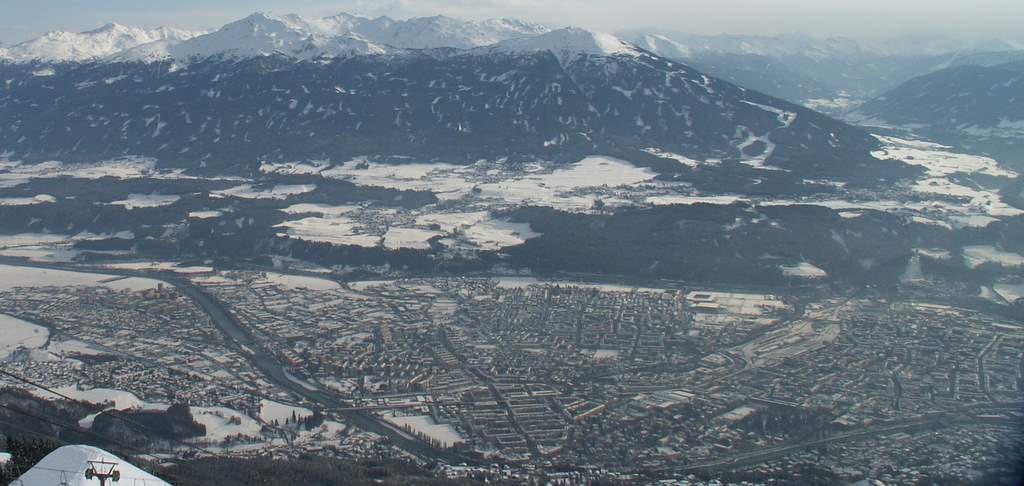
Innsbruck in winter

- Innsbruck, Austria

Innsbruck hosted the 1964 and 1976 Winter Olympics. AOC head Dr. Leo Wallner says the city is "predestined" to be the first host because of their experience, sport sites, and the spectacular Alps. Recent experience includes the Air & Style Snowboard Contest from 1994 to 1999 and 2008, the 2005 Men's World Ice Hockey Championships, and the 2005 Winter Universiade (with Seefeld). Innsbruck's Bergisel is expected to once again be the centerpiece of the bid.

Martin Schnitzer, CEO of Innsbruck 2012, outlined Innsbruck’s plan on June 19, 2008. All the venues are concentrated in two zones in Innsbruck and Seefeld, with only two temporary structures to be built. The Culture and Education Programme has the potential to generate a "digital media phenomenon" and will be based in Innsbruck Congress Centre. Innsbruck has committed to building a new Olympic Village that will be within 15 minutes of the venues and later become much needed social housing. In addition, the Innsbruck Tyrol region has invested US$225 million in venue and infrastructure in recent years.

Per the IOC report, Innsbruck was found to have a compact plan (using some venues in nearby Seefeld), strong experience and support, and a creative cultural and educational concept. The largest weakness are the plans for the Olympic Village, which will be both crowded (8:1 bed to bath ratio) and be under a very tight turnaround to build, although the Austrians assure it can be completed on schedule. They have presented an alternate plan with lower bed/bath ratios (4-5:1) but which will disperse participants, which is not preferred by the IOC. The budget for the Games is US$22 million.

In revealing the Finalist list, Innsbruck's bid received top accolades as the IOC evaluation suggested that "the city of Innsbruck presents the least risk to the IOC".

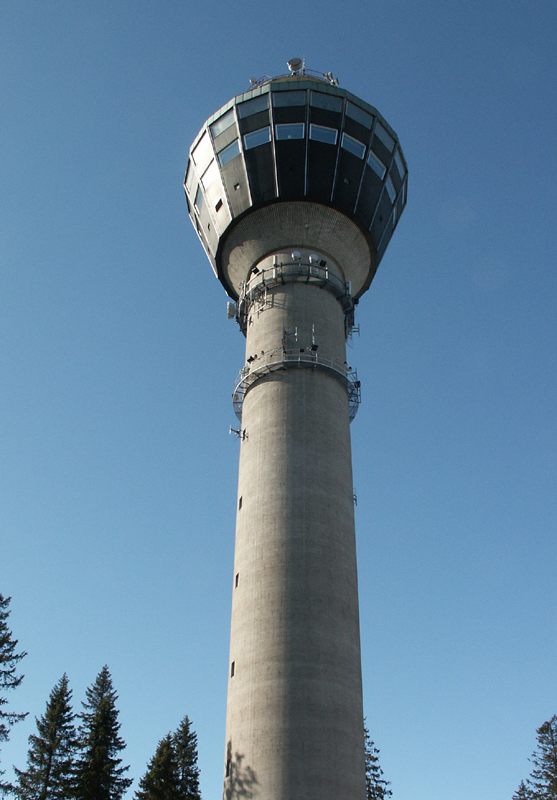
Puijo Tower atop the skiing area

== Finalist city overview ==
- Kuopio, Finland

Kuopio is a first time bidder. On the shores of Lake Kallavesi, it is the cultural centre of Eastern Finland and has a winter sports infrastructure in place. Puijo hill serves as a site for the yearly FIS Ski Jumping World Cup. Kuopio is a small city with a large University and many active young people - a model that may exemplify what the IOC is looking for in these Games. Kupio proposed hosting the Games between 10 and 19 February.

Evaluations found strong local government support, a compact single village, a well-designed culture and education program and a good level of experience in hosting international sports events as the bid’s principal strengths. The Panel expressed concern over Kuopio’s ability to deliver the Games at the proposed budget of US$14 million, explaining that it seems low. The Finns cited the strong culture of volunteerism in the nation as well as guaranteed coverages of shortfalls by various government levels, but the IOC was still uncertain if a quality Games could be delivered with that budget.

The Olympic Village offers 2,000 beds in existing student housing with additional accommodations nearby if required. A bed/bath ratio of 6:1, or possibly 4:1 is proposed. One negative factor is the Alpine skiing facilities at Tahko ski resort would not permit all skiing events to be held due to its maximum vertical drop of 200m. Also, Kuopio proposes a natural track for Luge competition and Kuopio’s competition schedule does not include Bobsleigh/sled. Both figure skating and short track would be held at Kuopio Hall, by building a temporary wall on the ice.

In considering the short preparation time of only three years, the final report said that Kuopio presents "some risks", some of which are associated with allocated budgets.

== Non-selected short list cities ==
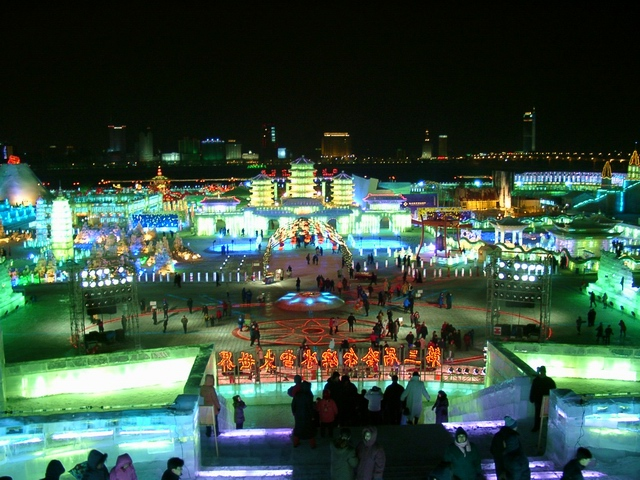
Harbin's "Ice and Snow World"

- Harbin, China

Harbin last bid for the 2010 Winter Olympics, but failed to make the shortlist. Harbin proposed the dates From 2 to 12 February. It is known as China's "Ice City" for its long winters and associated festivals. The annual Harbin International Ice and Snow Sculpture Festival has been held since 1985. Harbin hosted the third 1996 Winter Asian Games and the 2009 Winter Universiade. The Alpine skiing events took place in the Yabuli Ski Resort; Harbin plans to spend US$1.5 billion in construction and renovation of its sport infrastructure for possible Olympic bids.

The initial evaluation found the bid technically robust, using existing venues, good hosting experience and a large number of guaranteed hotel rooms within Harbin as principal strengths. However, a three village concept made for a rather dispersed project and the culture and education program was weak. With a budget of US$43 million, events at Mao'ershan National Nature Reserve were cancelled to reduce the Olympic Villages to two, but still the distance between Harbin and Yabuli is 150 km. A planned bobsleigh/sled site raised concerns, as did a reluctance to embrace a digital platform for the culture aspect. However, the Olympic Villages were strong with a 2:1 bath/bed ratio.

Ultimately, the IOC did not select Harbin as "a number of risks" were associated with the proposal due to lack of information provided by the bid committee.

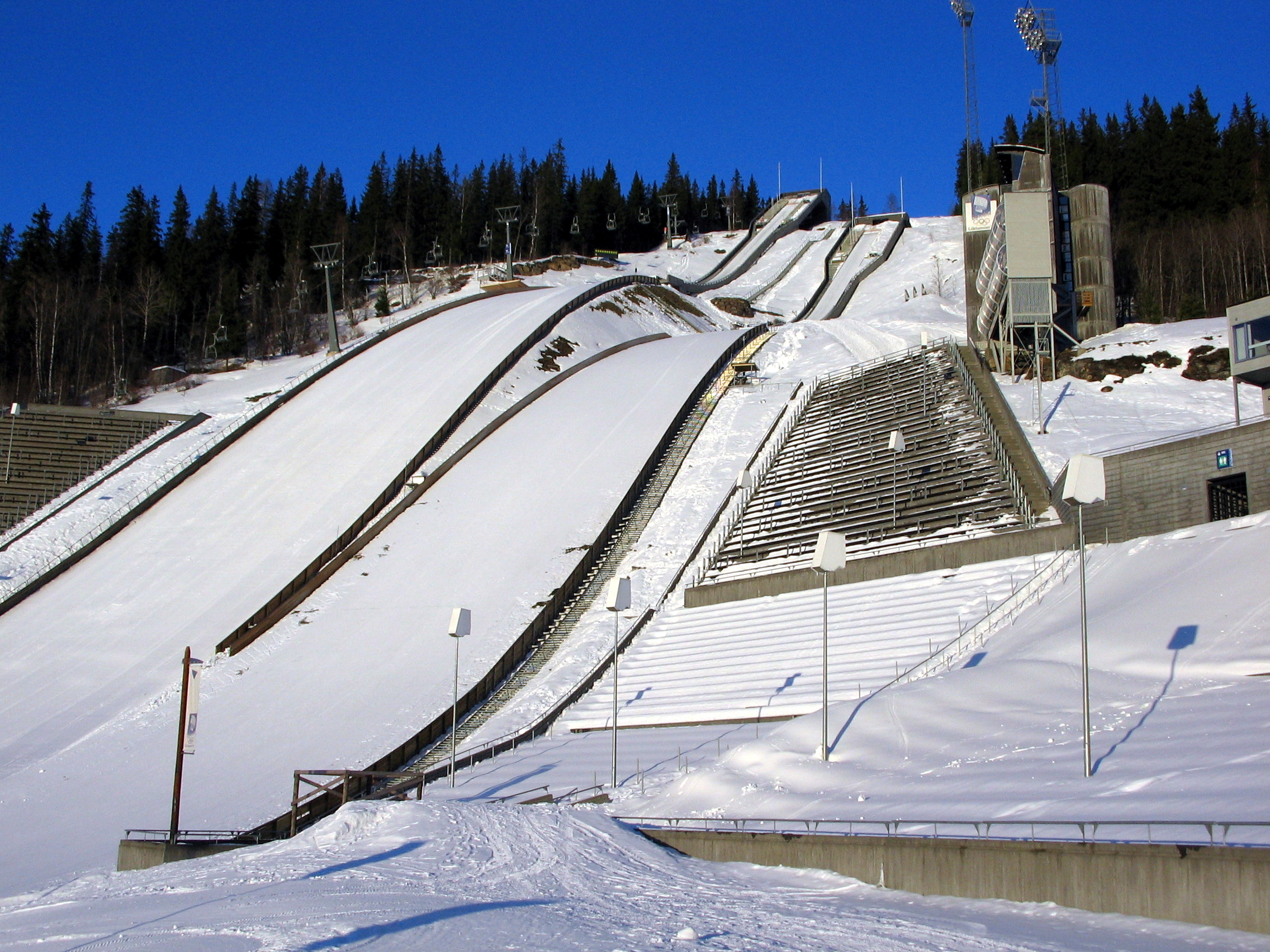
Lillehammer's ski jump

- Lillehammer, Norway

Norway hosted the Olympics twice before: in Lillehammer in 1994. and in Oslo in 1952. Norway's staging of the Games in 1994 is considered a modern highpoint, described as "fairy tale games...Reality cannot be this good." Lillehammer has hosted over 100 competitions since those Games and propose the games between 24 February to March 4.

Because it has a strong sports infrastructure, only the curling venue would have needed to be constructed. The budget is set at US$49 million, with the Norwegian federal government contributing $19 million and the balance from the IOC and sponsors. The budget was later reduced to US$43 million. Lillehammer's plans include a digital information platform for the educational component, a compact setting, and producing little environmental impact. The Games would be set between February 24 and March 4, 2012.

Between initial and later plans, Lillehammer made strides in defining the cultural and educational program, designing alternate Olympic Village plans (though still a concern), and some progress in funding and political support. However, despite Lillehammer's great experience, robust technical plans, and good balance of sport and culture, the financial risks and lack of national government guarantees were too serious and the bid did not make the final list. (Norway cancelled its bid for the 2018 Winter Olympics in Tromsø over budgetary concerns.)

Lillehammer bid for the 2016 Winter Youth Olympics and was the only city to enter a bid. They were awarded the games on December 7, 2011.

== Indicated interest ==
- Lake Placid, New York, United States considered a bid. It was the host of the 1932 Winter Olympics and the 1980 Winter Olympics. The USOC likely decided not to bid so as not to interfere with the Chicago 2016 Olympic bid.
- Portland, Maine, United States conducted a study for a bid. Likely sites were to include Newry and Rumford. The USOC did not support the bid.
- Sofia, Bulgaria The Bulgarian Olympic Committee considered Sofia, but ultimately decided against the bid. Sofia has applied to host the Winter Olympics in 1992, 1994, and 2014, but has not yet been successful.
- Turin, Italy was the host of the 2006 Winter Olympics. It was unsuccessful in its bid for the inaugural 2010 Youth Summer Olympics; pundits speculated it would bid for the Winter edition.
