= Soham El Wardini =

Mayor of Dakar

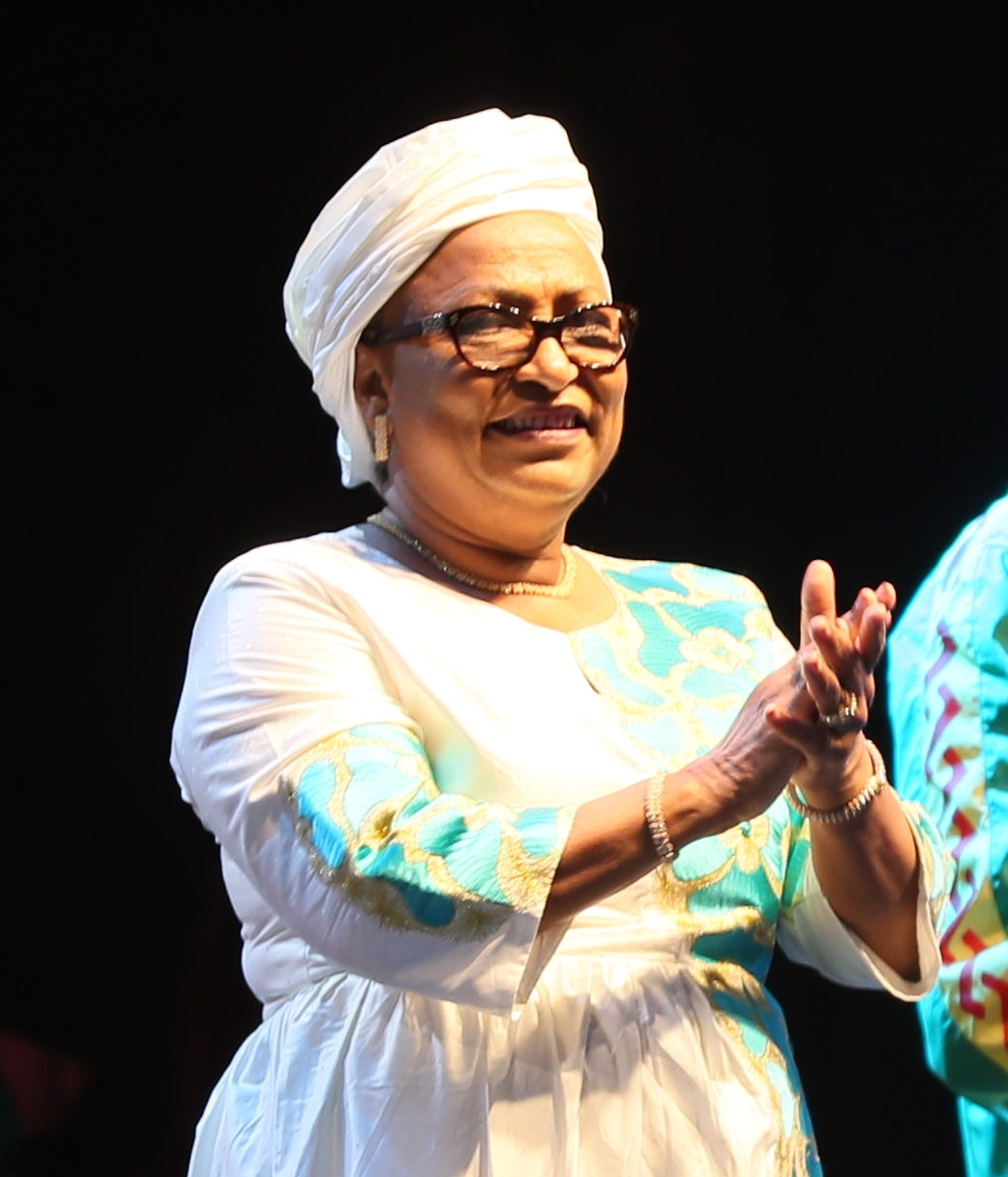
- El Wardini at the Closing Ceremony of the 2018 Summer Youth Olympics

Mayor of Dakar
- In office September 29, 2018 – January 23, 2022
- President: Macky Sall
- Preceded by: Khalifa Sall
- Succeeded by: Barthélemy Dias

Deputy Mayor of Dakar
- In office 2014 – August 31, 2018
- President: Macky Sall
- Preceded by: Position established
- Succeeded by: Position abolished

Personal details
- Born: 1953 (age 72–73) Latmingué, Kaolack Region
- Education: Cheikh Anta Diop University

Soham El Wardini (born in 1953) is a Senegalese politician and former mayor of Dakar, Senegal. She is the first woman to be mayor of post-independence Dakar and the first deputy mayor of the city.

== Biography ==
Wardini was born in 1953 in the rural community of Latmingué, Kaolack Region, Senegal. She and her 10 siblings were born to a Senegalese mother and a Senegalese father with Lebanese roots. Following her father's death, her family moved to the city of Kaolack, where she attended high school. She majored in English at Cheikh Anta Diop University (then University of Dakar) and taught at various colleges.

Wardini won the title of Miss Senegal and Miss Senegambia in 1970.

== Career ==
In 1999, Wardini joined the Alliance of the Forces of Progress. Following the split of the AFP in 2012, she joined mayor of Dakar, Khalifa Sall's faction and became his deputy in 2014 – the first and only deputy mayor in the city's history. In March 2017, Khalifa Sall was sentenced to five-years for the embezzlement of CFA 1,800,000,000 in public funds. Wardini was placed as acting mayor until August 2017, when president Macky Sall dismissed Khalifa Sall in a presidential decree.

In September 2018, Wardini ran for mayor of Dakar and was elected with a majority vote in city council with 64 votes. She won over candidates Banda Diop with 13 votes and Moussa Sy with 11 votes. Wardini became the first woman to be mayor of Dakar, post-independence.

On October 8, 2018, the 133rd IOC Session voted unanimously for Dakar to host the 2022 Summer Youth Olympics, the first Olympic games to be hosted in Africa. During the closing ceremony of the 2018 Summer Youth Olympics, Buenos Aires mayor Horacio Rodríguez Larreta and IOC president Thomas Bach handed the Olympic flag to Wardini.

Soham El Wardini will not be able to run for the next local election.
