= Bids for the 2028 Winter Youth Olympics =

Overview
- V Winter Youth Olympic Games
- Winner: Dolomites and Valtellina, Italy

Details
- Committee: IOC
- Election venue: 143rd IOC Session; Lausanne, Switzerland

Map of the bidding cities
- Missing location of the bidding cities

Important dates
- Shortlist: 3 December 2024
- Decision: 30 January 2025

Decision
- Winner: Dolomites and Valtellina, Italy
- Runner-up

Dolomites and Valtellina were officially awarded the Games at the 143rd IOC Session in Lausanne, Switzerland, on 30 January 2025.

== Bidding process ==
The new IOC bidding process was approved at the 134th IOC Session at their headquarters in Lausanne, Switzerland. The key proposals driven by the relevant recommendations from Olympic Agenda 2020, are:

- Establish a permanent, ongoing dialogue to explore and create interest among cities/regions/countries and National Olympic Committees for any Olympic event
- Create four Future Host Commissions (Summer, Winter and Youth Games) to oversee interest in future Olympic events and report to the IOC executive board
- Give the members present at the Sessions more influence by having non-EB members form part of the Future Host Commissions

At this session, IOC modified the Olympic Charter to increase flexibility by removing the rule to select a host city for the Games, the period between 5 and 7 years before the next available games, and changing the concept of the host-city and opened the possibility to Games to be held in a multiple cities, regions, or countries.

=== Dialogue stages ===
According to Future Host Commission terms of reference with rules of conduct, the new IOC bidding system is divided to 2 dialogue stages are:

- Continuous Dialogue: Non-committal discussions between the IOC and Interested Parties (City/Region/Country/NOC interested in hosting) with regard to hosting future Olympic events.
- Targeted Dialogue: Targeted discussions with one or more Interested Parties (called Preferred Host(s)), as instructed by the IOC Executive Board. This follows a recommendation by the Future Host Commission as a result of Continuous Dialogue.

=== Targeted Dialogue ===
On 1 February 2024, IOC President Thomas Bach announced that the host city wouldn't be announced until early 2025.

On 20 July 2024, the IOC Executive Board named Dolomiti Valtellina, a project led by the Italian National Olympic Committee (CONI) and its regional partners in Lombardy, Trentino and Veneto, as the "Preferred Host". The project would build on the legacies of the 2026 Olympic Winter Games, entirely using existing venues. If all the requirements for hosting the Youth Olympic Games are met, the bid could then be put forward for election in a future IOC Session.

Dolomites and Valtellina were selected as the host cities at the 143rd IOC Session in Lausanne on 30 January 2025.

== Bidding parties ==
The following are interested bidding parties for the 2028 Winter Youth Olympics, one of which took part in targeted dialogue with the IOC and Future Host Commission:

=== Preferred hosts ===
- Dolomites and Valtellina, Italy

In June 2023, the Italian regions of Veneto, Lombardy and Trentino began continuous dialogue with the International Olympic Committee over hosting the Winter Youth Olympic Games in 2028. Milan, the capital of Lombardy, with Cortina d'Ampezzo in Veneto, will be the main host cities of the 2026 Winter Olympics, while Val di Fiemme in Trentino will host several events during those games as well.
In July 2024, the International Olympic Committee (IOC) Executive Board named the Italian bid (now referred to as Dolomiti Valtellina) the preferred candidate to host the 2028 Winter Youth Olympics. The bid utilizes clusters of existing venues in Cortina, Val di Fiemme, and Valtellina, with six of the ten competition venues being shared with the 2026 Winter Olympics.

=== Interested parties ===
==== Europe ====
- Sarajevo, Bosnia and Herzegovina

On September 27, 2023, the Olympic Committee of Bosnia and Herzegovina president Izet Rađo announced that Bosnia and Herzegovina would prepare a bid to host the Youth Olympic Games in the future, though it was not specified whether they were pursuing either the Summer or Winter Youth Olympic Games. Sarajevo previously hosted the 1984 Winter Olympics and the 2019 European Youth Olympic Winter Festival.

- Carinthia, Austria, Friuli-Venezia Giulia, Italy and Slovenia

On 11 April 2024, Peter Kaiser, the governor of Carinthia, announced that a joined bid of the Austrian state of Carinthia, alongside the Italian region of Friuli-Venezia Giulia and an unknown state in Slovenia, will be prepared. If selected, the Winter Youth Olympics would pose as a test event for an eventual Olympic bid in the future.

- Sofia, Bulgaria

On 23 April 2024, the Bulgarian Olympic Committee held a meeting with the Bulgarian president, Rumen Radev, and other political leaders and sports industry representatives to discuss the potential for Bulgaria to host the Youth Olympic Games. They proposed that the capital, Sofia and the nearby mountain, Vitosha host. They also acknowledged the need for sports and transport infrastructure in the country to be modernized, as well that efforts from the public would be necessary. Sofia previously expressed interest in hosting the 2012 and 2016 Winter Youth Olympics, but decided against bidding for either.

- Lviv, Ukraine, Poland and Sigulda, Latvia

In November 2019, the mayor of the Ukrainian city of Lviv announced that the city would bid for the 2028 Winter Youth Olympics as well as the 2030 Winter Olympics. The nordic and ice sports would be staged in Poland, the bobsleigh and luge competitions in Sigulda, Latvia. After the Russian invasion of Ukraine in February 2022, a bid seems unlikely.

==== North America ====
- Lake Placid, United States

On 13 February 2023, Lake Placid Mayor Art Devlin announced that a bid for the 2028 Winter Youth Olympics is up to debate. Lake Placid previously hosted the 1932 and 1980 Winter Olympics, as well as the 2023 Winter World University Games.
