= Bids for the 2024 Winter Youth Olympics =

Overview
- IV Winter Youth Olympic Games
- Winner: Gangwon Province, South Korea

Details
- Committee: IOC
- Election venue: 135th IOC Session; Lausanne, Switzerland

Map of the bidding cities

Important dates
- Shortlist: 5 December 2019
- Decision: 10 January 2020

Decision
- Winner: Gangwon Province, South Korea
- Runner-up

There were a total of four bids which were initially submitted for the 2024 Winter Youth Olympics. On 8 January 2020, the IOC EB agreed to award the 2024 Winter Youth Olympics to the province of Gangwon.

Gangwon Province were officially awarded the Games at the 135th IOC Session in Lausanne, Switzerland, on 10 January 2020.

== Bidding process ==
The new IOC bidding process was approved at the 134th IOC Session in Lausanne, Switzerland. The key proposals driven by the relevant recommendations from Olympic Agenda 2020, are:

- Establish a permanent, ongoing dialogue to explore and create interest among cities/regions/countries and National Olympic Committees for any Olympic event
- Create two Future Host Commissions (Summer and Winter Games) to oversee interest in future Olympic events and report to the IOC executive board
- Give the IOC Session more influence by having non-EB members form part of the Future Host Commissions

IOC also modified Olympic Charter to increase flexibility by removing the date of election from 7 years before the games, and changing the host as a city to multiple cities, regions, or countries.

=== Future Host Winter Commissions ===
The full composition of the Winter Commissions, oversee interested hosts, or with potential hosts where the IOC may want to create interest, is as follows:

Future Host Winter Commissions for 2024 Winter Youth Olympics
IOC members (4)	Other members (4)
(Romania) Octavian Morariu (chair); (Sweden) Gunilla Lindberg; (Austria) Karl Stoss; (Afghanistan) Samira Asghari	(China) Zhang Hong (Athletes); (Switzerland) Gian-Franco Kasper (AIOWF); (Chile) Neven Ilic (NOCs); (Netherlands) Rita van Driel (IPC)

=== Dialogue stages ===
According to Future Host Commission terms of reference with rules of conduct, the new IOC bidding system is divided to 2 dialogue stages are:

- Continuous Dialogue: Non-committal discussions between the IOC and Interested Parties (City/Region/Country/NOC interested in hosting) with regard to hosting future Olympic events.
- Targeted Dialogue: Targeted discussions with one or more Interested Parties (called Preferred Host(s)), as instructed by the IOC Executive Board. This follows a recommendation by the Future Host Commission as a result of Continuous Dialogue.

=== Final selection ===
Pyeongchang could be formally elected as host of the 2024 Winter Youth Olympics on 10 January 2020 at the 135th IOC Session in Lausanne, Switzerland if all the requirements are fulfilled to the satisfaction of the Commission and the Executive Board. The eligible voters are 82.

2024 Youth Olympic Games bidding results
Party	Nation	Votes
Gangwon Province	South Korea	79
None of bid		2
Absentation		1
Total		82

== Bidding parties ==
The bidding parties for the 2024 Youth Olympics were:

=== Preferred hosts ===
The preferred hosts, which took part in targeted dialogue with IOC and Future Host Commission:

- Gangwon Province, South Korea

Governor of Gangwon Province, Choi Moon-soon, announced that the province had submitted a letter of interest to host 2024 Youth Winter Olympics with several venues from 2018 Winter Olympics as a part of post-Games plan. Choi also hoped that Masikryong Ski Resort in North Korea could host some skiing events. On 5 December 2019, the IOC executive board accepted the recommendation of the Future Host Commission for the Olympic Winter Games to initiate a targeted dialogue with the Korean Sport & Olympic Committee (KOC) for the 2024 Winter Youth Olympics, after IOC received the proposal from the KOC and Gangwon Province also has support from the National Ministry of Culture, Sports and Tourism, and the cities of PyeongChang and Gangneung.

=== Interested parties ===
The interested parties, take part in continuous dialogue with IOC and Future Host Commission, were:

- Brașov, Romania

Brasov hosted the 2013 European Youth Olympic Winter Festival and submitted a bid to host the 2020 Youth Olympic Games (it lost over the Olympic Capital, Lausanne). The Romanian Olympic Committee announced that there might be a possibility to submit a new bid for the 2024 Games.

- Sofia, Bulgaria

Bulgaria’s Prime Minister Boyko Borissov launched a bid to host the event after Thomas Bach visited Sofia in September, 2018. Sofia bid to host the 1992 and 1994 Winter Olympics, but lost to Albertville and Lillehammer respectively. Sofia was going to bid for the 2016 Winter Youth Olympics but did not submit a bid citing that they did not fill the requirements set by the IOC. The Bulgarian Olympic Committee was also interested in the city potentially bidding for the 2020 Winter Youth Olympics but eventually declined.

- Ushuaia, Argentina

Before the 2018 Summer Youth Olympics, held in Buenos Aires, International Olympic Committee President Thomas Bach visited Ushuaia and talked about the possibility of holding the 2024 Winter Youth Olympics here. By the end of the games, Bach said: "We were very impressed with the facilities in Ushuaia and in the mountains, seeing the many teams preparing for the winter sport season and all very happy with the conditions both on and off the ski piste. Ushuaia may study of hosting the Youth Winter Olympic Games but there is still some way to go". He also mentioned that the city needs to address where to host ice sport events, though the infrastructure for skiing is well developed. In October 2014 the Argentine Olympic Committee (COA) had already revealed the plan to use the 2018 Summer Youth Olympics as the launchpad for a bid in the near future. The Committee identified Argentina's south-eastern region of Patagonia, which comprises the southern section of the Andes mountains, as a possible location to host the Winter Games, while in 2010 it was suggested that Ushuaia would be the main option for a bid. The commonly regarded southernmost city in the world hosts the annually cross-country skiing marathon Ushuaia Loppet, has hosted several ice hockey tournaments (at the only full-size ice rink of South America) and the FIS Freestyle Slopestyle World Cup, organized by the International Ski Federation.

Possible venues:

- Cerro Castor: located 26 km from downtown Ushuaia, is the southernmost full-fledged ski resort in the world. It would host Alpine skiing, Ski Cross, Snowboard Cross, Ski Mountaineering, Ski Freestyle (Halfpipe, Slopestyle) and Snowboard (Halfpipe, Slopestyle).
- Tierra Mayor and Francisco Jerman Nordic Ski Area: located 20 km and 7 km away respectively from downtown Ushuaia, would host biathlon and cross-country skiing.
- Polideportivo Municipal: this multisports venue is located 1 km away from downtown and includes the 3500 seats Estadio Agustín Pichot (used mostly for rugby, has hosted two Americas Rugby Championship's matches), the 2000 seats Estadio Municipal Hugo Lumbreras (used mostly for football, it hosts all matches of the Ushuaian Football League), the Jose Cochocho Vargas Indoor Stadium (opened in 2015, seat capacity of 1000) and an outdoor short track and ice hockey Olympic-Size Ice rink (30 by 60 metres (98 by 197 feet)), the first of its kind in South America. This area would host the opening and closing ceremonies, ice hockey, figure skating, short track and curling.

- Harbin or Changchun, China

Harbin, the capital of Heilongjiang province and largest city in the northeastern China confirmed to apply for hosting the games on 3 March 2017. The city has hosted most international sporting events such as the 1996 Asian Winter Games and the 2009 Winter Universiade. Harbin previously bid for the 2012 edition but lost to Innsbruck, Austria.

Changchun, the capital of Jilin province also considering a bid for the games and hosted most events such as the 2007 Asian Winter Games.

== Cancelled bid ==
- Sochi, Russia

Sochi had expressed their interest to host the 2024 edition. The city previously hosted the 2014 Winter Olympics. On 9 December 2019, WADA barred Russia from bidding for international events as part of their penalty for state sponsored doping, meaning the bid has been rejected by the IOC.
