= Lillehammer Art Museum =

Art gallery located in Lillehammer, Norway

Coordinates: 61°06′56″N 10°27′50″E

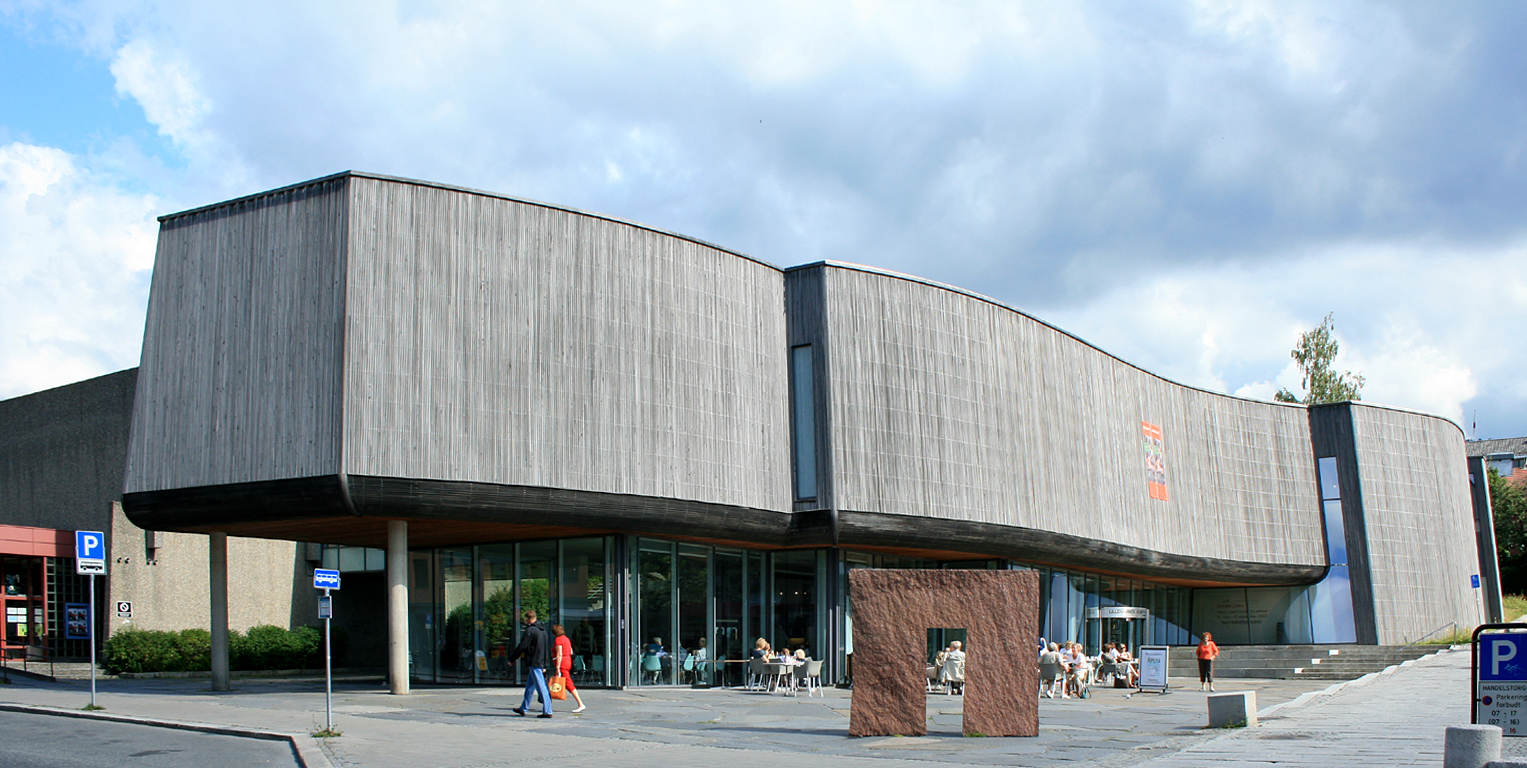
Lillehammer Art Museum

Lillehammer Art Museum (Norwegian: Lillehammer kunstmuseum) is an art gallery located in Lillehammer, Norway.

The museum was founded in 1921 as a gift from merchant Einar Lunde. It has three main collections: one consisting of over 100 paintings from adherents of the Matisse school, donated by Einar Lunde from the 1920s. In 1958, antique dealer Oscar Johannesen donated his entire collection from the 19th century. In 2008, Jon Dobloug donated major parts of his collection including 159 paintings dating from the 1980s and 1990s.

The older part of the collection, pictures donated by Lunde and Johannessen, is mainly found in the building designed by architect Erling Viksjø, which was completed in 1963. The newer building (Flygelet) was designed by the architecture firm Snøhetta and opened to the public in 1992. During the 1994 Winter Olympics, this building served as the main venue for cultural activities.
