= 133rd IOC Session =

The 133rd IOC Session was an IOC Session held in Buenos Aires, Argentina, on 8 October 2018, during the 2018 Summer Youth Olympics. This was the second IOC Session held in Buenos Aires after the 125th IOC Session. The Candidature Phase for 2026 Winter Olympics was opened and the host of the 2022 Summer Youth Olympics (Dakar, Senegal) was announced at this IOC Session, the first African host city.

Before the session the Olympism in Action Forum was held in the city.

The session took place at the Buenos Aires Hilton in Buenos Aires.

== Votes results ==
2022 Youth Olympic Games bidding results
City	Nation	Votes
Dakar	Senegal	Unanimous

The Senegal President Macky Sall and Dakar Mayor Soham El Wardini were present at the session.

== Election of the new IOC members ==
Nine new IOC members were elected at the session.

The nine new members are:

- (Islamic Republic of Afghanistan) Samira Asghari
- (Lithuania) Daina Gudzinevičiūtė
- (Italy) Giovanni Malagò (as of January 1, 2019)
- (Paraguay) Camilo Pérez López Moreira
- (Rwanda) Felicite Rwemarika
- (Uganda) William Blick
- (Bhutan) Prince Jigyel Ugyen Wangchuck
- (Brazil) Andrew Parsons
- (Japan) Morinari Watanabe
