= Felicite Rwemarika =

- Born: 9 March 1958 (age 68); Ruanda-Urundi (now Rwanda)
- Education: Mulago Hospital
- Occupations: Women's rights activist, entrepreneur, nurse
- Organization: Association of Kigali Women in Sports (AKWOS)
- Known for: Promoting gender equality in sports and conflict resolution
- Title: Member of the International Olympic Committee
- Awards: Ashoka Fellow (2012); IOC Award for Women and Sport (2016)

Felicite Rwemarika (born March 9, 1958 in Ruanda-Urundi, now Rwanda) is a women's rights activist, entrepreneur, and member of the International Olympic Committee. Her work focuses on raising awareness for gender equality in sports and using sports as a tool for conflict resolution and economic empowerment. She is also an organizer of financial literacy trainings.

== Early life and education ==
Rwemarika's family left Rwanda during the Rwandan Revolution and resettled in the Democratic Republic of the Congo. She is one of 14 children.

From 1985 to 1995, Rwemarika studied at the Mulago Hospital in Uganda and received a diploma in nursing. She went on to receive degrees in business administration.

== Career ==
Rwemarika has founded two businesses, worked as a nurse, and served as country coordinator and chair of a non-governmental organization. She is also a speaker at the American University of Nigeria on unity and reconciliation through sport.

Rwemarika is the founder, chair, and legal representative of the Association of Kigali Women in Sports (AKWOS), an organization dedicated to helping women who were victims of the 1994 Tutsi genocide through sports. She has played a role in various international women's sports organization, including the CECAFA Women Commission (2011), Rwanda National Olympic and Sports Committee (2013 - 2017), and Women's Football Commission in the Rwandan Football Federation (2017 - 2018).

== Honors ==
Rwemarika was selected as an Ashoka Fellow in 2012. In 2015, she received an award from the Stars Foundation and from Girls Collective. In 2016, she received the IOC Award for Women and Sport on the African continent.
