= Rotterdam bid for the 2018 Summer Youth Olympics =

Bids for the 2018 Summer Youth Olympics
Overview
- Games of the III Youth Olympiad

Details
- City: Rotterdam, Netherlands
- NOC: Dutch Olympic Committee

Previous Games hosted
- none

Rotterdam 2018 was a bid by the city of Rotterdam and the Dutch Olympic Committee to host the 2018 Summer Youth Olympics.

== History ==
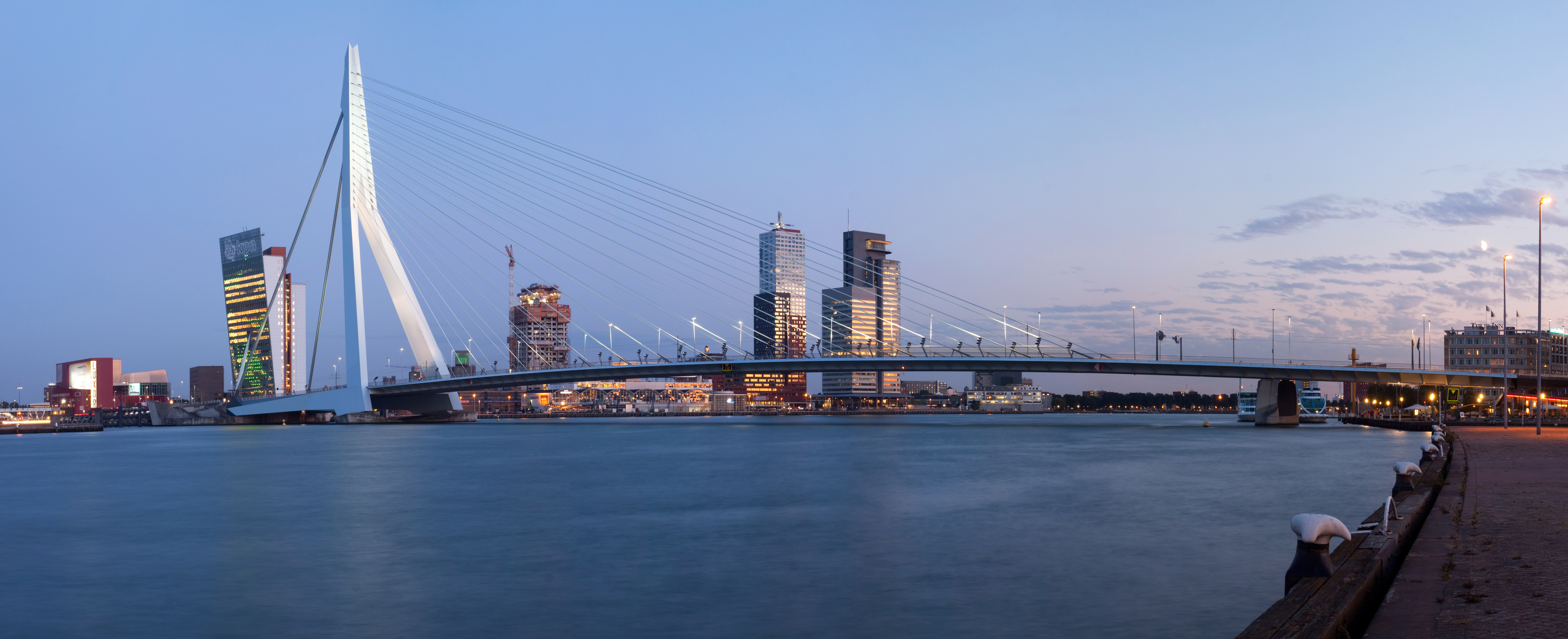
View of the Erasmus Bridge

On February 29, 2012 it was announced that Rotterdam would bid for the 2018 Summer Youth Olympics

Rotterdam failed to become a Candidate City for the games when the IOC selected the Candidate cities on February 13, 2013.

Buenos Aires was ultimately selected as the host city of the 2018 Summer Youth Olympic Games on July 4, 2013.

== Previous bids by other Dutch cities ==
Amsterdam has made a total of six bids for the Summer Olympic Games. They first bid for the 1916 Summer Olympics but lost to Berlin. These games however were cancelled due to World War I. They then bid for the 1920 and 1924 Summer Olympics but lost to Antwerp and Paris respectively. Amsterdam went on to successfully bid for the 1928 Summer Olympics. The city later went on to bid for the 1952 and 1992 Summer Olympics but lost to Helsinki and Barcelona respectively.

== See also ==
- Netherlands at the Olympics
- Bids for the 2018 Summer Youth Olympics
