= Bids for the 2014 Summer Youth Olympics =

Overview
- Games of the II Youth Olympiad
- Winner: Nanjing; Runner-up: Poznań; Shortlist: Guadalajara

Details
- Committee: IOC
- Election venue: Vancouver

Map of the bidding cities

Important dates
- Bid: 2 February 2009
- Shortlist: 15 December 2009
- Decision: 10 February 2010

Decision
- Winner: Nanjing (47 votes)
- Runner-up: Poznań (42 votes)

The bidding for the 2014 Summer Youth Olympics Games began on 2 February 2009, with cities presented their candidature files. In the competition to host the inaugural Youth Olympic Games in 2014, the IOC list three cities in December 2009 (Nanjing, Poznań, and Guadalajara). Guadalajara officially withdrew the bid on 22 January 2010, two weeks after the release of the IOC evaluation commission's report and less than three weeks before the final vote in Vancouver.

In January 2010 in Lausanne, Switzerland the IOC reported that Nanjing was the highest rated city in the evaluation report, follow by Poznań and lastly Guadalajara. Nanjing was announced as the host city on 10 February 2010 after a tally of the voters in the IOC Session.

== Process ==
Cities interested in hosting the games had to have their applications confirmed by their respective National Olympic Committees and submitted to the International Olympic Committee (IOC) by September 2009. On October, three cities were confirmed as official candidates by the Committee. The evaluation committee began the evaluation in November. On January 8, 2010, the International Olympic Committee released their report on the Evaluation Commission for the Second Youth Olympic Games. The 2014 host city was elected during the 2010 IOC session in Vancouver, prior to the 2010 Winter Olympics. This was the first election of a Youth Olympic Games host city held in an IOC Session. The elections for the host cities of the 2010 Summer Youth Olympics and 2012 Winter Youth Olympics were done through postal votes by IOC members.

2014 Youth Olympic Games bidding results
City	NOC Name	Votes
Nanjing	China	47
Poznań	Poland	42

=== Evaluation of candidate cities ===
==== Candidate cities comparison ====
2014 Candidate Cities
Category	Details	Guadalajara Mexico	Nanjing China	Poznań Poland
Population	City	1,564,514 (2009)	8,004,680 (2010)	551,627 (2010)
Population	Country (2010)	112,336,538	1,339,724,852	38,186,860
Bid budget (million US$)	Total	82.745	117.133	64.740
Bid budget (million US$)	Guaranteed subsidy	65%	72.5%	68%
Bid budget (million US$)	Estimated sponsorship	9%	9%	7.7%
Main airport	Name	GDL	NKG	POZ
Main airport	Distance (km)	21	35	12.6
Main airport	Capacity (million)	7	12	1.5
Main airport	Handled (2010)	6,953,900	12,530,515	1,419,121
Venues	Total	22	25	22
Venues	Completed	13	21	17
Venues	Temporary	4	3	2
Venues	Travel time (mins)	~30	~30	~30
Olympic village	Distance (km)	21	35	13
Olympic village	Beds	5,115	5,187	5,120
Accommodation	Total rooms	1,645	3,995	2,668

== Candidate Cities ==
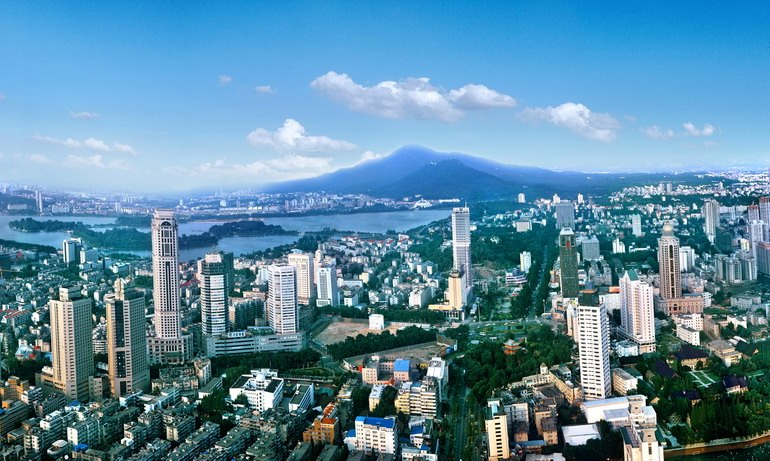
Nanjing, China

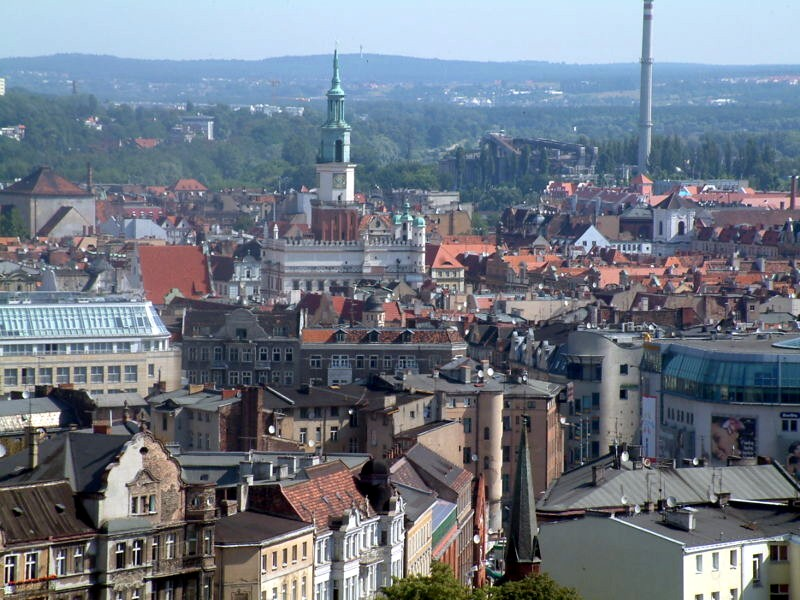
Poznań, Poland

- Nanjing, China

China bid for the 2014 Summer Youth Olympics with the city of Nanjing. Nanjing is located in East Central China along the Yangtze River. The IOC noted Nanjing had "the least risk" of the applicant cities.

- Poznań, Poland

Poznań bid for the inaugural Youth Olympic Games which went to Singapore.

=== Withdrawn candidate ===
- Guadalajara, Mexico

Guadalajara was chosen over Monterrey by the Mexican Olympic Committee (Comité Olímpico Mexicano) as the national applicant city for the 2014 Youth Olympics. Guadalajara hosted the 2011 Pan American Games. Guadalajara officially withdrew the bid on 22 January 2010, two weeks after the release of the IOC evaluation commission's report and less than three weeks before the final vote in Vancouver.

== Cities indicating interest, but did not bid ==
- Belgrade, Serbia

Belgrade showed initial interest in bidding for the 2010 Summer Youth Olympics, going so far to attend the initial workshop in Lausanne, Switzerland at the IOC headquarters. However, the city withdrew, declaring an intention to bid for the second edition instead.

- Jakarta, Indonesia

Jakarta had been confirmed, but ultimately did not bid.

- Moscow, Russia

Moscow was the finalist along with eventual winner Singapore in the contest for the 2010 YOG. Moscow declared it would bid for future editions, but did not bid for this edition.

- Rabat, Morocco

Rabat, the capital and second largest city in Morocco was planning to bid for the Youth Olympic Games 2014 but didn't.

- New Delhi, India

Citing the experience it will have gained in hosting the 2008 Commonwealth Youth Games in Pune, and the 2010 Commonwealth Games in New Delhi, Indian Olympic Association president Suresh Kalmadi has declared the intention to bid for the 2014 Games, as well as possibly the 2020 edition of the regular Games.

- Rouen, Toulouse and Dunkirk, France

Three French cities had expressed interest in bidding for the Games. The French NOC decided in October 2008 to bid for the 2018 Winter Olympics with Annecy instead.

- Monterrey, Mexico

Students of the universities of Monterrey supported hosting the Games. The MOC passed over Monterrey in favor of Guadalajara, which will have valuable infrastructure from hosting the 2011 Pan American Games. The Monterrey 2014 Foundation declared it would bid for 2018 if Guadalajara loses this bid.
