= 2028 Winter Youth Olympics =

Multi-sport event

V Winter Youth Olympic Games
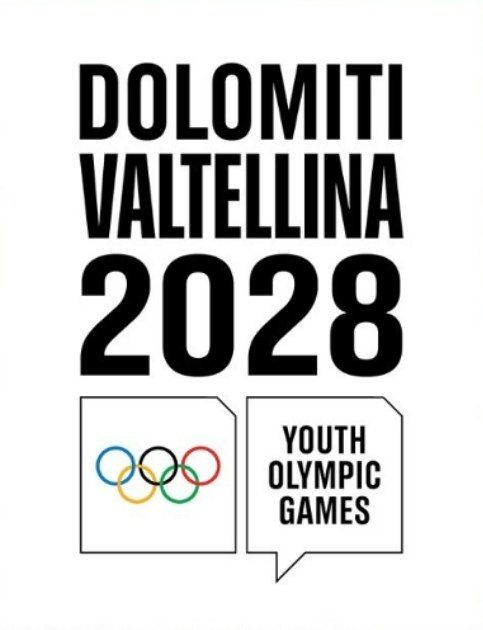
- Location: Dolomites and Valtellina, Italy
- Events: 79 in 8 sports (16 disciplines)
- Opening: 15 January 2028
- Closing: 29 January 2028
- Stadium: Stelvio (opening ceremony); Cross country and biathlon center Fabio Canal (closing ceremony)

The 2028 Winter Youth Olympics (Italian: Giochi olimpici giovanili invernali del 2028), officially known as the V Winter Youth Olympic Games and commonly known as Dolomiti Valtellina 2028, will be the fifth edition of the Winter Youth Olympics, an international winter sports, education and cultural festival for teenagers, in a city designated by the International Olympic Committee (IOC).

This will be the fifth time Italy hosted an Olympic event, and the first time the country hosted either the Summer or Winter Youth Games.

== Bidding process ==
The IOC's Future Host Commission named Dolomites and Valtellina as its preferred candidates for the Games and entered into targeted dialogue with the region under the new Olympic bid process.

Dolomiti Valtellina was officially awarded the Games at the 143rd IOC Session in Lausanne, Switzerland, on 30 January 2025.

2028 Youth Olympic Games bidding results
Party	Nation	Votes
Dolomites and Valtellina	Italy	89
None of bid		1
Absentation		2
Total		92

== Development and preparation ==
=== Venues ===
The venue plan mostly uses venues that were also used in the 2026 Winter Olympics and the 2013 Winter Universiade.

==== Trentino ====
Venue	Events	Capacity
Cross country and biathlon center Fabio Canal	Closing ceremony	15,000
Cross country and biathlon center Fabio Canal	Cross-country skiing	15,000
Cross country and biathlon center Fabio Canal	Nordic combined	15,000
Ice Rink Piné	Ice hockey	1,800
Ice Rink Piné	Speed skating	2,000
Giuseppe Dal Ben Ski Jumping Arena	Ski jumping	4,500
Giuseppe Dal Ben Ski Jumping Arena	Nordic combined	4,500

==== Valtellina ====
Venue	Events	Capacity
Stelvio	Opening ceremony	5,000
Stelvio	Alpine skiing	5,000
Livigno Snow Park	Snowboarding	3,000
Palaghiaccio Bormio	Figure skating	500
Palaghiaccio Bormio	Short track speed skating	500
Valdidentro Biathlon Stadium	Biathlon	4,000
TBA	Ski mountaineering	TBA

==== Cortina d'Ampezzo ====
Venue	Events	Capacity
Cortina Sliding Centre	Bobsleigh	5,000
Cortina Sliding Centre	Luge	5,000
Cortina Sliding Centre	Skeleton	5,000
Stadio olimpico del ghiaccio	Curling	3,000

== The Games ==
=== Sports ===
The initial sports program was announced on 15 December 2025.The program for this edition will feature 8 sports in a total of 79 events. 15 events from 2024 were dropped, and 8 events will be new, including synchronised skating for figure skating, mixed singles for luge, and moguls and rail events for freestyle skiing and snowboarding. On 2 November 2026, ski mountaineering was added, returning for the first time since 2020.

- Alpine skiing (8)
- Biathlon (5)
- Bobsleigh (2)
- Cross-country skiing (5)
- Curling (1)
- Figure skating (4)
- Freestyle skiing (13)
- Ice hockey (2)
- Luge (3)
- Nordic combined (3)
- Short track speed skating (7)
- Skeleton (2)
- Ski jumping (3)
- Ski mountaineering (5)
- Snowboarding (9)
- Speed skating (7)

Preceded by Gangwon	Winter Youth Olympic Games; Dolomites–Valtellina; 2028	Succeeded by TBA
