= Mesna Upper Secondary School =

School in Lillehammer, Norway

Coordinates: 61.1249°N 10.4728°E

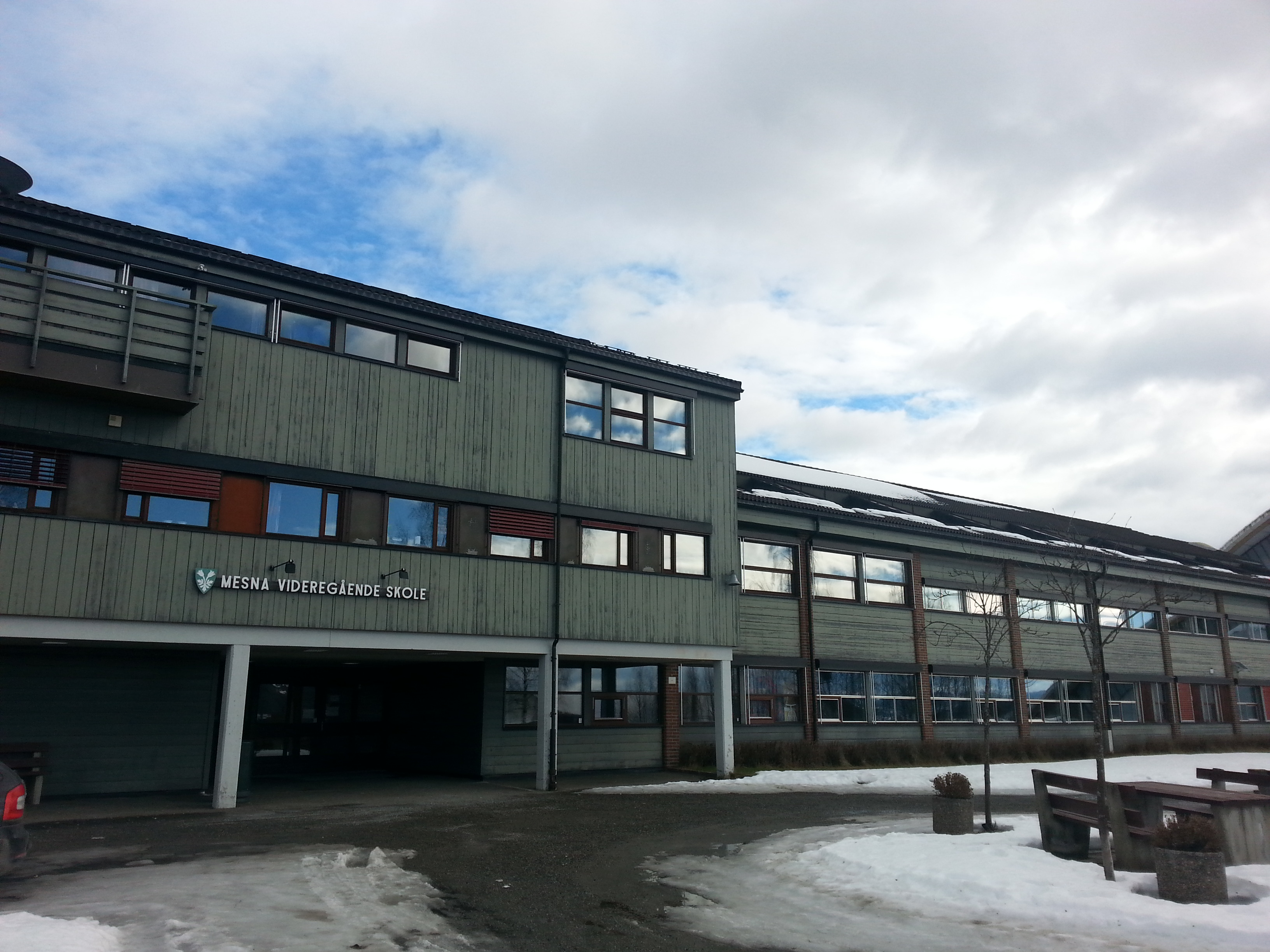
school

Mesna Upper Secondary School (Norwegian: Mesna videregående skole) is one of three public upper secondary schools in Lillehammer, Norway.

It is located near Stampesletta and was opened on 26 August 1985. During the 2016 Winter Youth Olympics, the school is scheduled to act as the media center.
