= Lillehammer bid for the 2016 Winter Youth Olympics =

Bids for the 2016 Winter Youth Olympics
Overview
- II Winter Youth Olympic Games
- Winner: Lillehammer

Details
- City: Lillehammer, Norway
- NOC: Norwegian Olympic and Paralympic Committee and Confederation of Sports

Previous Games hosted
- 1994 Winter Olympics

Decision
- Result: Winner

Lillehammer 2016 was the successful bid by the city of Lillehammer and the Norwegian Olympic and Paralympic Committee and Confederation of Sports for the 2016 Winter Youth Olympics. Lillehammer was the only bidder for the games and were awarded the games on 7 December 2011.

== History ==
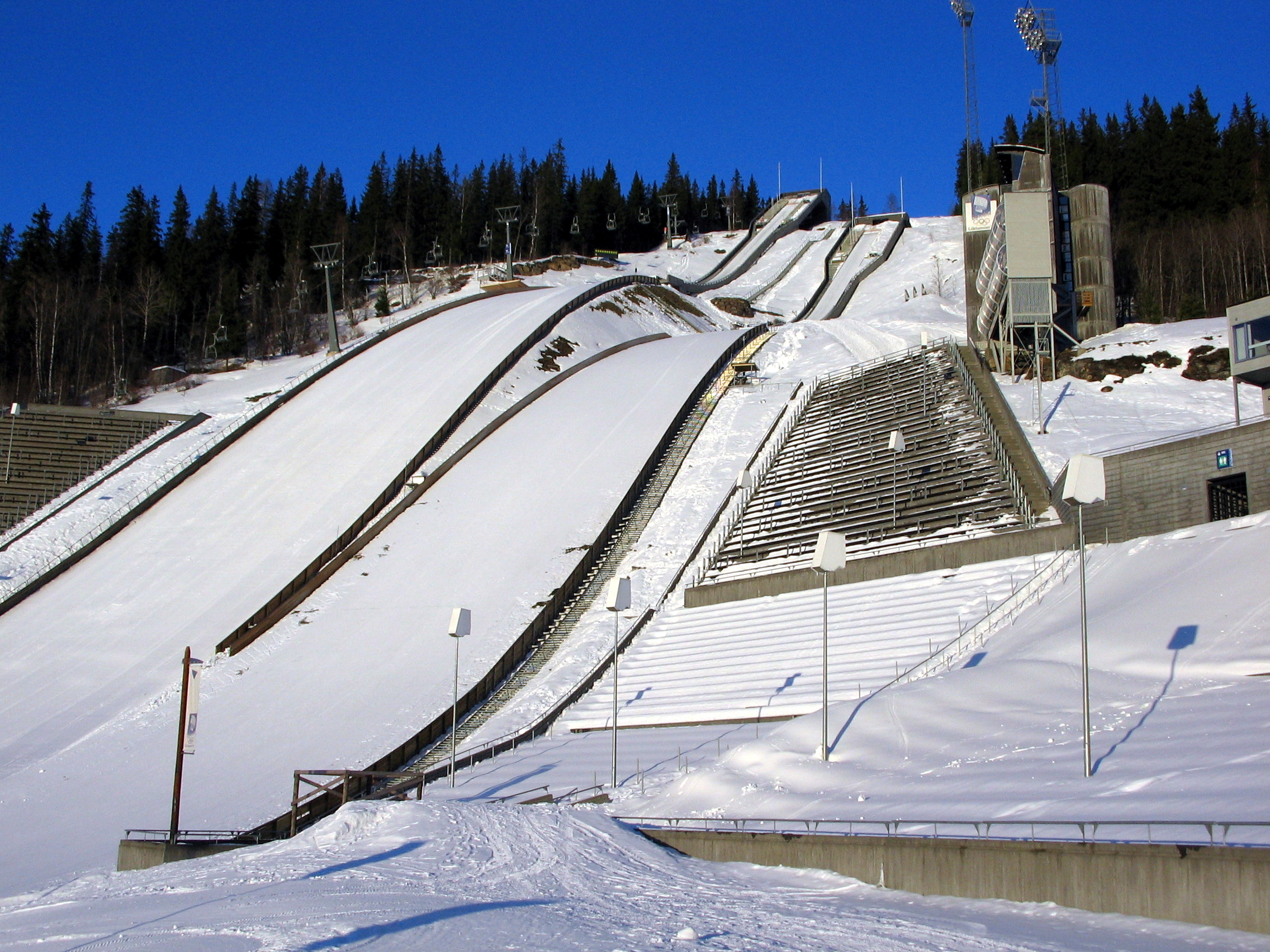
Olympic ski jump, used at the 1994 Winter Olympics

Lillehammer launched its bid in 2010 following discussion over a possible bid earlier that year. Bids were due by December 2010. Upon the deadline, the IOC confirmed Lillehammer as the only bid for the games. The city bid for the 2012 Winter Youth Olympics but failed to become a candidate. Innsbruck was ultimately awarded the games. Lillehammer is proposing to host the games between 12 and 21 February 2016. The NOC spoke to the IOC and Norwegian political authorities by 15 June to see if there was a basis for a formal application, in particular for a governmental financial guarantee covering any potential economic shortfall. On 11 November, IOC Evaluation commission present the result of its evaluation of the Lillehammer bid. Lillehammer was awarded the games on 7 December 2011.

Lillehammer hosted the 1994 Winter Olympics and bid for the 1992 Winter Olympics, losing out to Albertville.
