= Bids for the 2032 Summer Olympics =

Selection of the host for the 2032 Summer Olympics

Bids for the 2032 Summer Olympics and Paralympics
Overview
- Games of the XXXV Olympiad; XIX Paralympic Games
- Winner: Brisbane

Details
- Committee: IOC
- Election venue: 138th IOC Session; Tokyo

Map of the bidding cities

Important dates
- Decision: 21 July 2021

Decision
- Winner: Brisbane
- Runner-up

The selection of the host for the 2032 Summer Olympics saw a new process being introduced from 2019. The bidding process saw Brisbane, Australia, the first ever sole bidder for an Olympics bid, chosen as the preferred and expected host that was officially certified by the IOC on the eve of the 2020 Summer Olympics on 21 July 2021 in Tokyo, Japan.

== Bidding process ==
The new IOC bidding process was approved at the 134th IOC Session on 24 June 2019 in Lausanne, Switzerland. The key proposals, driven by the relevant recommendations from Olympic Agenda 2020, are:

- Establish a permanent, ongoing dialogue to explore and create interest among cities/regions/countries and National Olympic Committees for any Olympic event
- Create two Future Host Commissions (Summer and Winter Games) to oversee interest in future Olympic events and report to the IOC executive board
- Give the IOC Session more influence by having non-executive board members form part of the Future Host Commissions.

The IOC also modified the Olympic Charter to increase its flexibility by removing the date of election from seven years before the games and changing the host as a city from a single city/region/country to multiple cities, regions, or countries.

The change in the bidding process was criticised by members of the German bid as "incomprehensible" and hard to surpass "in terms of non-transparency".

=== Future host summer commissions ===
The full composition of the summer commissions, who oversee interested hosts, or with potential hosts where the IOC may want to create interest, is as follows:

Future Host Summer Commissions for 2032 Summer Olympics
IOC members (6)	Other members (4)
(Norway) Kristin Kloster Aasen (chair); (Canada) Dick Pound; (China) Li Lingwei; (Philippines) Mikee Cojuangco-Jaworski; (Dominican Republic) Luis Mejía Oviedo; (Cape Verde) Filomena Fortes	(New Zealand) Sarah Walker (Athletes); (Italy) Francesco Ricci Bitti (ASOIF); (Kenya) Paul Tergat (NOCs); (Brazil) Andrew Parsons (IPC)

=== Dialogue stages ===
According to Future Host Commission terms of reference with rules of conduct, the new IOC bidding system is divided into two dialogue stages are:

- Continuous Dialogue: Non-committal discussions between the IOC and Interested Parties (City/Region/Country/NOC interested in hosting) concerning hosting future Olympic events.
- Targeted Dialogue: Targeted discussions with one or more Interested Parties (called Preferred Hosts), as instructed by the IOC Executive Board. This follows a recommendation by the Future Host Commission as a result of Continuous Dialogue.

=== Host selection ===
On 21 June 2021, Brisbane was confirmed as host of the 2032 Summer Olympics at the 138th IOC Session in Tokyo, Japan. As per the new format of choosing future Olympic Games host cities from the IOC's Agenda 2020, the vote was in a form of a referendum to the 80 IOC delegates. According to the Australian Broadcasting Corporation, 72 of the delegates voted Yes, 5 voted No, and 3 other votes were abstained.

2032 Summer Olympics host city election
City	NOC name	Yes	No	Abs
Brisbane	Australia	72	5	3

City	Country	National Olympic Committee	Result
Brisbane	Australia	Australian Olympic Committee (AOC)	Declared Host
Further information: Brisbane bid for the 2032 Summer Olympics Following the success of the 2018 Commonwealth Games on the Gold Coast, Queensland, President of the Australian Olympic Committee (AOC) John Coates said he strongly supported a bid from Queensland for the 2032 Summer Olympics and Paralympics. Following speculation, a feasibility study was also commissioned by the Southeast Queensland Council of Mayors with the outcome due back by the end of 2018. A 2019 feasibility study commissioned by South-East Queensland Council of Mayors back in 2016, and investigated by French company Lagardère on South East Queensland's (SEQ) eligibility to host the 2032 Olympic games concluded the region was capable of hosting the event, and that infrastructure and transport upgrades already needed would provide a financial return. The feasibility report notes that 80 percent of the venues needed for such a bid already exist across the southeast, with others predicted to be constructed before 2032 in line with community needs. The document suggests Brisbane would be the host of 21 Olympic venues, the Gold Coast and the Sunshine Coast would both host 5 venues, with the remaining 7 venues to be hosted within the SEQ region. SEQ Mayors including then Brisbane Lord Mayor Graham Quirk made emphasis on the need to make the games cost effective through reusing existing facilities and using the event as a catalyst for infrastructure and job creation. A feasibility study which was published in February forecasted that $900 million of state and federal funds would be needed to help host the 2032 Olympics and Paralympics. On 1 July 2019, Prime Minister Scott Morrison made an announcement that the Federal government would be officially supporting the Queensland Olympic bid, saying the government "will be there every step of the way". On 13 July 2019, the Prime Minister put forward $10 million towards the bid, as well as nominating Queensland LNP federal MP Ted O'Brien to help with the bid on behalf of the Commonwealth. Queensland Premier Annastacia Palaszczuk announced on 9 December 2019 that the state will make an official and regional bid for the 2032 Olympic Games with proposed dates of 23 July to 8 August, exactly 11 years to these dates of the rescheduled 2020 Summer Olympics. On 24 February 2021, Brisbane was chosen by the IOC to be a preferred candidate city to host the 2032 Olympics. On 10 June 2021, it was reported that Brisbane would be set to receive the rights to host the Olympics by 21 July 2021, which ultimately did. It became the first host city to win the bid unopposed since the 1984 Los Angeles Games.

== Interested parties which did not advance to IOC board approval ==
The following were interested bidding parties for the 2032 Summer Olympics which did not advance to IOC board approval, one of which took part in targeted dialogue with the IOC and Future Host Commission:

=== Asia ===
- Ahmedabad, India

During a meeting with the IOC President Thomas Bach, IOA President Narinder Batra expressed India's interest in hosting the 2032 Summer Olympics. In response, Bach said India can host the event but advised to wait until the bidding procedure starts. India has already submitted their official interest to bid for the 2032 Games. Rajeev Mehta, Secretary-General of the IOA, said that they were very serious about bidding for the 2032 Summer Olympics and they had already submitted a letter of expression of interest of hosting the Games to the IOC. On 30 December 2019, Indian Olympic Association secretary Rajeev Mehta said that the IOA had ratified the decision during their Annual General Meeting to bid for the event and requires the support of the Indian Government. India will also host the 141st IOC Session in 2023 in Mumbai. In February 2020 IOC member John Coates stated that India had abandoned its bid for hosting the 2032 Olympics and Paralympics and would concentrate to bid for 2026 Summer Youth Olympics. Batra denied Coates's claims and stated that he was misquoted and that they are still looking to bid for the 2032 Games. In May 2020, Batra said in a statement that the country would step up its efforts to bid for the 2032 Summer Olympics once the COVID-19 pandemic eases. A 230 acre sports complex in Ahmedabad named as the Sardar Vallabhbhai Patel Sports Enclave, which could possibly host the Olympics. The cost of the complex is $630 million.

- Jakarta, Indonesia

On 1 September 2018, the President of Indonesia, Joko Widodo, announced in a meeting in Bogor with the presidents of the IOC and the Olympic Council of Asia that Indonesia would bid to host the 2032 Olympics following the major success of the 2018 Asian Games and Para Games. On 19 February 2019, Indonesia made the 2032 Olympics bid official, as letters from President Joko Widodo and Indonesian Olympic Committee were delivered to the IOC in Lausanne. In November 2020, President Joko Widodo has instructed his cabinet members to prepare a road map for the country's bid to host the 2032 Summer Olympic and Paralympic Games. This decision was meant to demonstrate the seriousness and the commitment of the Indonesian government to bring the Summer Olympics to Southeast Asia for the first time.

- Doha, Qatar

Qatar had announced that Doha would bid for the 2032 Games. It would have been the first Olympic Games in the Arab world. Qatar has hosted several events including the 1988 AFC Asian Cup, 2006 Asian Games, 2011 AFC Asian Cup, 2015 World Men's Handball Championship, 2018 World Artistic Gymnastics Championships, 2019 World Athletics Championships, the 2022 FIFA World Cup, the 2023 World Judo Championships and the 2024 World Aquatics Championships. The country will also host the 2027 FIBA Basketball World Cup and 2030 Asian Games.

=== Europe ===
- Rhine-Ruhr, Germany (with sailing venue in Kiel)

The German state of North Rhine-Westphalia revealed a plan to host the 2032 Games in 13 cities. The cities listed were Düsseldorf, Dortmund, Cologne, Bonn, Aachen, Duisburg, Essen, Gelsenkirchen, Krefeld, Leverkusen, Mönchengladbach, Oberhausen and Recklinghausen. Over 90 per cent of required venues are already available, including 16 stadiums with a capacity of more than 30,000 seats, and also 24 large sports halls. This is also the first time a bid has included such a large number of cities. Three of these cities were hosts to venues of the 2006 FIFA World Cup. Sailing events could be hosted in Kiel, which won a referendum on the 2024 bid at the same time when Hamburg narrowly lost one. Suitable athletics stadiums are found in Berlin and Munich with their former Olympic stadiums, however, there have been challenges to find a venue for track and field events in the bid cities. There have also been suggestions of temporary stadium expansions for up to 50,000 spectators, which would be dismantled after the games or decreased in capacity for domestic use. The only prospective option is the expansion of Rhein-Energie Stadion, the home stadium of FC Köln, from 49,996 to 73,000 seats, giving it enough capacity for the athletics competition. It could be accomplished with a temporary lower-stand covering platform for up to 40,000 people, similar to the expansion in seats at Hampden Park for the 2014 Commonwealth Games in Glasgow. Regardless of the chosen athletics venue, the likely venue for ceremonies remains the Signal Iduna Park football stadium (Westfalenstadion) in Dortmund with 66,000 seats.

- Madrid, Spain

On 17 June 2019, then newly-elected mayor of Madrid José Luis Martínez-Almeida announced that they would explore a bid for the 2032 games. It would mark the 40th anniversary of the 1992 Summer Olympics held in Barcelona and the 50th anniversary of the 1982 FIFA World Cup. It would also be the first royal sporting event for which both Madrid and Barcelona were host cities and, politically, the 220th anniversary of the first constitution's adoption. Madrid has no venues for water sports or velodrome, nor a large permanent athletics stadium. The aquatic centre from the 2012, 2016, and 2020 bids have undergone improvement. Aquatic events could possibly be staged outside of Madrid. Athletic competitions could be held in Madrid's Metropolitano Stadium. Its track and field platform and 40,000 seats obviates the need for the using the Seville and Barcelona Olympic stadiums. Madrid's previous bids went unsuccessful after lost in 2012, 2016, 2020 to London, Rio de Janeiro and Tokyo, respectively.

== Other bids that did not advance ==
=== Asia ===
- Chengdu–Chongqing, China

On 27 November 2020, the Sichuan Provincial Sports Bureau confirmed that Chengdu and Chongqing had the intention of bidding for the 2032 Summer Olympic Games. Chengdu has already hosted the 2007 FIFA Women's World Cup and World Police and Fire Games 12 years later, and will host the 2021 Summer World University Games and 2025 World Games in the future.

- Shanghai/Shanghai–Hangzhou, China

Shanghai authorities confirmed that they ordered a feasibility study on hosting the 2032 Olympic Games (which might have also included Hangzhou), but they did not formally launch a bid.

=== Europe ===
- Istanbul, Turkey

On 8 June 2020, the Vice-President of the Turkish Olympic Committee (TNOC) Hasan Arat said "Istanbul should be a candidate city for the 2032 Summer Olympic Games." Istanbul bid unsuccessfully for the 2000 Summer Olympics, 2008 Summer Olympics, and the 2020 Summer Olympics, which lost to Sydney, Beijing and Tokyo respectively.

- North–Central Italy, Italy

In September 2019, Dario Nardella and Virginio Merola, the Mayors of Florence and Bologna respectively, expressed their interest in bidding for the 2032 Summer Olympics. Bologna's city councillor for sport, Matteo Lepore, described the Olympics as "a dream that we can aspire to and achieve". Neither Bologna nor Florence had ever bid for a Summer or a Winter Olympics, but hosted the 1990 FIFA World Cup. Both cities lack suitable venues for the Olympics, so other cities may get involved. The northern part of Italy will host the 2026 Winter Olympics in Milan and Cortina d'Ampezzo.

- Rotterdam–Amsterdam, Netherlands

On 3 February 2020, it was announced that there were discussions on a possible bid for the 2032 Summer Games among athletes and businesses across the Netherlands.

- London, United Kingdom (possible co-bid with Birmingham, Manchester, Liverpool, Weymouth and Portland)

In February 2019, the Mayor of London Sadiq Khan and UK Sport expressed their interest in bidding for either the 2032 or 2036 Olympics. The mayor remarked that 2032 'was not out of the question' but 2036 is more likely, but gave no firm information. London hosted the Summer Olympics in 1908, 1948, and 2012.

- Budapest, Hungary

On 27 January 2021, the Hungarian Olympic Committee announced they would be exploring the possibility of Budapest bidding for hosting the Olympic Games in 2032. The Hungarian Prime Minister Viktor Orbán said that he would "like to live to see Hungary hosting the Olympics", which is certainly a boost to hopes of a 2032 bid. The Budapest 2032 Committee will be led by Attila Szalay-Berzeviczy, the former President of the Budapest Stock Exchange. Hungary has never hosted the Olympics before, but bid unsuccessfully for 1916, 1920, 1936, 1944, 1960, and most recently 2024, which it awarded to Paris. HOC president Krisztián Kulcsár said: “In 2021 we arrived to year in which the Hungarian Olympic Committee has to address the tasks preceding candidacy for and hosting the 2032 Olympic Games and has to set up a respective team, otherwise the Hungarian Olympic Committee would not do its job properly”. Hungary has also won the most Olympic medals for any nation to have never hosted the world’s biggest quadrennial sports event.

- Salla, Finland

In January 2021, the mayor of Salla, Erkki Parkkinen, launched a bid to host the Olympic Games in 2032 to raise awareness of climate change. Despite being a small town within the Arctic Circle, the bid was made to send a serious message to the world about the threat the climate crisis poses and the importance of acting quickly. Parkkinen noted 2032 as an important turning point for climate change, stating that it would be too late if it isn't kept under control by 2032.

=== North America ===
- Montreal–Toronto, Canada

On 3 February 2021, the Journal de Montreal reported that the Canadian Olympic Committee was exploring the possibility of a joint Montreal-Toronto bid for either the 2032 or 2036 Summer Olympics. Potential venues included those used for the 1976 Summer Olympics in Montreal, and the 2015 Pan Am Games in Toronto.

== Cancelled or rejected bids ==
=== Asia ===
- Seoul–Pyongyang, Korea

North and South Korea announced that they would pursue a joint bid to host the 2032 Olympic Games in a statement released on 19 September 2018, following a summit between North Korean leader Kim Jong-un and South Korean President Moon Jae-in. It was reported that both of the countries would host a forum on the 2032 Summer Games on 15 February 2019, in Lausanne, Switzerland to discuss it. They have released that the initial proposed cost of hosting the games would be at $3.44 billion. However, the World Anti-Doping Agency (WADA) has found that North Korea's testing program is non-compliant with the World Anti-Doping Code; if this position is still the case in 2032, the requirement that any country submitting a bid be in compliance with WADA’s code mean the bid could have collapsed.

- Delhi, India

In 2018, Indian Olympic Association president Narendra Dhruv Batra expressed interest to bid for the Games. The Indian sports ministry announced in May 2020 that the Jawaharlal Nehru Sports Complex in Delhi will be redeveloped at the cost of $1.08 billion, which could host the Olympics in future. On 9 March 2021, Chief Minister of Delhi Arvind Kejriwal announced that his party would focus for the 2048 Games.

- Mumbai, India

In 2018, Maharashtra chief minister Devendra Fadnavis confirmed Mumbai's interest in bidding for the 2026 Summer Youth Olympics and the 2032 Summer Olympics. The city would eventually host the 141st IOC Session in 2023.

- Singapore and Kuala Lumpur, Malaysia

Singapore and Malaysia declared a joint bid for the 2032 Summer Olympics in 2014. However, in 2018, Olympic Council of Malaysia (OCM) Honorary President Tunku Imran announced the withdrawal of the joint bid due to the suspension of Kuala Lumpur–Singapore high-speed rail project, which had been expected to be completed in 2026. This was due to austerity measures taken by the government, and the rail project was later canceled. Kuala Lumpur has hosted six editions of the Southeast Asian Games while Singapore has hosted four editions. Malaysia also hosted the 1998 Commonwealth Games while Singapore hosted the 2010 Summer Youth Olympics.

=== Europe ===
- St. Petersburg, Kazan, and Sochi, Russia

It was stated by Governor Georgy Poltavchenko that St. Petersburg may bid for the Summer Olympics in 2032 or 2036. The three cities were among the 12 that hosted the 2018 FIFA World Cup. Sochi is the only one that has ever hosted the Olympics among the three, hosting the 2014 Winter Olympics, and was going to host the 2022 Special Olympics World Winter Games in Kazan until they were cancelled. However, Russia was involved in a doping investigation for lying to WADA inspectors in January 2019, and World Athletics barred Russian athletes from competing under their banner, pressuring the IOC to do the same in Olympic events. On 26 November 2019, WADA asked the IOC to reject the bid as a punishment for doping sample manipulations made in January. On 9 December, WADA banned Russia from bidding for international events as part of their penalty for state-sponsored doping, meaning the bid has been rejected by the IOC. However, Russia appealed to the CAS which shortened the ban to two years, ending in 16 December 2022. This means Russia can bid for international sporting events again starting after that date.

=== North America ===
- Guadalajara, Tijuana, and Monterrey, Mexico

Carlos Padilla, president of the Mexican Olympic Committee believes that Guadalajara is one of the four Mexican cities (next to Mexico City, Tijuana and Monterrey) that could attempt to host some Olympic games after 2026. In an interview with the ESPN chain the director said that those four cities "have everything" to seek to be headquarters, but not immediately. Guadalajara hosted the 2011 Pan American Games, and bid for the 2022 Gay Games, losing to Hong Kong.
