= Brisbane bid for the 2032 Summer Olympics =

Bids for the 2032 Summer Olympics
Overview
- Games of the XXXV Olympiad

Details
- City: Brisbane, Australia
- NOC: Australian Olympic Committee (AOC)

Previous Games hosted
- None; Bid for 1992

Brisbane 2032 is a successful bid for the 2032 Summer Olympics by the city of Brisbane and the Australian Olympic Committee. On 10 June 2021, the bid won IOC board approval and is expected to host the 2032 Summer Olympics. Brisbane officially received the rights to host the Olympics on 21 July 2021. Brisbane became the first host city to win the bid unopposed since 1984.

== History ==
Following the success of the 2018 Commonwealth Games on the Gold Coast, Queensland, President of the Australian Olympic Committee (AOC) John Coates said he strongly supported a bid from Queensland for the 2032 Summer Olympics and Paralympics. Following speculation, a feasibility study was also commissioned by the Southeast Queensland Council of Mayors with the outcome due back by the end of 2018. A 2019 feasibility study commissioned by South-East Queensland Council of Mayors back in 2016, and investigated by French company Lagardère on South East Queensland's eligibility to host the 2032 Olympic games concluded the region was capable of hosting the event, and that infrastructure and transport upgrades already needed would provide a financial return. The feasibility report notes that 80 per cent of the venues needed for such a bid already exist across the south-east, with others predicted to be constructed before 2032 in line with community needs. The document suggests Brisbane would be host of 21 Olympic venues, the Gold Coast and the Sunshine Coast would both host 5 venues, with the remaining 7 venues to be hosted within the SEQ region. SEQ Mayors including then Brisbane Lord Mayor Graham Quirk made emphasis on the need to make the games cost effective through reusing existing facilities and using the event as a catalyst for infrastructure and job creation. A feasibility study which was published in February forecasted that $900 million of state and federal funds would be needed to help host the 2032 Olympics and Paralympics. On 1 July 2019, Prime Minister Scott Morrison, made an announcement that the Federal government would be officially supporting the Queensland Olympic bid, saying the government "will be there every step of the way". On 13 July 2019, the Prime Minister put forward 10 million dollars towards the bid, as well as nominating Queensland LNP federal MP Ted O'Brien to help with the bid on behalf of the Commonwealth. Queensland Premier Annastacia Palaszczuk announced on 9 December 2019 that the state will make an official and regional bid for the 2032 Olympic Games with proposed dates of 23 July to 8 August. On 24 February 2021, Brisbane was chosen by the IOC to be a preferred candidate city to host the 2032 Olympics.

== Previous bids ==
Australia has hosted the Olympic Games twice in 1956 in Melbourne and in 2000 in Sydney. Brisbane made a previous bid for the Summer Games in 1992 which was held in Barcelona.

== Major sport events in Brisbane and surrounding areas ==
Brisbane has the following experience of hosting major sports events as well as high profile international events.

- 1957 Rugby League World Cup in Sydney and Brisbane
- 1968 Rugby League World Cup in Sydney, Brisbane and Auckland
- 1976 Finn World Championships in Brisbane
- 1977 Rugby League World Cup in Sydney, Brisbane, Auckland and Christchurch
- 1982 Commonwealth Games in Brisbane
- 1982 Underwater Hockey World Championships in Brisbane
- 1987 Rugby World Cup some events in Brisbane
- 1987 Pan Pacific Swimming Championships in Brisbane
- 1988 World Junior Figure Skating Championships in Brisbane
- 1988 World Amateur Bodybuilding Championship
- 1989 BMX World Championships in Brisbane
- 1991 470 World Championships in Brisbane
- 1992 Cricket World Cup some events in Brisbane
- 1994 World Masters Games in Brisbane
- 1994 World Artistic Gymnastics Championships in Brisbane
- 1996 World Junior Figure Skating Championships in Brisbane
- 2000 Summer Olympics – Football, with multiple games being played in Brisbane
- 2001 Goodwill Games in Brisbane (with some events on the Gold Coast)
- 2001 World Masters Athletics Championships in Brisbane
- 2003 Rugby World Cup some events in Brisbane
- 2008 Rugby League World Cup some events in Brisbane and Gold Coast
- 2008 Women's Rugby League World Cup in Brisbane and the Sunshine Coast
- 2012 Men's Laser Radial World Championship in Brisbane
- 2015 Asian Cup some events in Brisbane
- 2015 Cricket World Cup some events in Brisbane
- 2017 Rugby League World Cup some events in Brisbane
- 2017 Women's Rugby League World Cup in Sydney and Brisbane
- 2018 Commonwealth Games on the Gold Coast (with some events in Brisbane)
- 2023 Underwater Hockey World Championships (in Gold Coast)
- 2023 FIFA Women's World Cup some events in Brisbane

== Venues ==
=== Brisbane Zone ===
Venues in the Greater Brisbane Area
Venue	Capacity	Events
The Gabba	50,000	Athletics (Track and Field), Ceremonies
Brisbane Convention & Exhibition Centre	6,000 (Hall 1); 6,500 (Hall 2); 6,000 (Hall 4)	Badminton; Fencing; Taekwondo; Table Tennis
South Bank Piazza	4,500	3x3 Basketball
South Bank Cultural Forecourt	4,000	Archery
Brisbane Live	15,000	Aquatics (Swimming and Water Polo)
Lang Park	52,000	Football (finals); Rugby
Brisbane Showgrounds	15,000	Equestrian
Victoria Park	25,000	Cycling (BMX Freestyle); Equestrian (Cross Country)
Ballymore Stadium	10,000 (Pitch 1); 5,000 (Pitch 2)	Field Hockey
Brisbane Indoor Sports Centre	12,000	Basketball
Sleeman Centre	10,000 (Chandler Indoor Sports Centre); 5,000 (Anna Meares Velodrome); 4,300 (Brisbane Aquatics Centre); 2,000 (Brisbane International Shooting Centre)	Gymnastics; Cycling (Track and BMX Racing); Aquatics (Diving, Artistic Swimming, Water Polo-Preliminaries); Shooting
Brisbane Entertainment Centre	11,000	Handball
Moreton Bay Indoor Sports Centre	7,000	Boxing
Manly Boat Harbour	10,000	Sailing
Redland Whitewater Centre	8,000	Canoe (Slalom)
Queensland Tennis Centre	5,500	Tennis
Wyaralong Flatwater Centre	14,000	Canoe (Sprint); Rowing
Ipswich Stadium	10,000	Modern Pentathlon

=== Gold Coast Zone ===
Venues on the Gold Coast
Venue	Capacity	Events
Gold Coast Convention & Exhibition Centre	6,000 (Arena); 5,000 (Hall 3)	Weightlifting, Volleyball (Preliminaries)
Broadbeach Park Stadium	12,000	Beach volleyball
Gold Coast Sports and Leisure Centre	12,000	Judo, Wrestling
Royal Pines Resort	15,000	Golf
Southport Broadwater Parklands	5,000	Triathlon, Aquatics (Swimming Marathon)
Coomera Indoor Sports Centre	11,000	Volleyball
Robina Stadium	27,400	Football (Preliminaries)

=== Sunshine Coast Zone ===
Venues on the Sunshine Coast
Venue	Capacity	Events
Sunshine Coast Stadium	20,000	Football (Preliminaries)
Sunshine Coast Indoor Sports Centre	6,000	Basketball (Preliminaries)
Alexandra Headland	5,000	Cycling (Road); Athletics (Marathon, Race Walks); Sailing (Kiteboarding)
Sunshine Coast Mountain Bike Centre	10,000	Cycling (Mountain Bike)

=== Outlying Venues ===
City	Venue	Capacity	Events
Townsville	North Queensland Stadium	25,000	Football (Preliminaries)
Cairns	Barlow Park	20,000	Football (Preliminaries)
Toowoomba	Toowoomba Sports Ground	15,000	Football (Preliminaries)
Sydney	Sydney Football Stadium (2022)	42,500	Football (Preliminaries)
Melbourne	Melbourne Rectangular Stadium	30,050	Football (Preliminaries)

=== Non-competitive ===
Venue	Events	Capacity
Northshore Hamilton	Brisbane Olympic Village	14,000
Collyer Quays, Robina, Queensland	Gold Coast Olympic Village	2,600
Brisbane Convention & Exhibition Centre	Main Press Centre	
Brisbane River Cluster	International Broadcast Centre	

== Accommodation ==
Two athlete's villages are envisaged:

- Hamilton in Brisbane, and
- Gold Coast.

== See also ==
- Brisbane bid for the 1992 Summer Olympics
