= Venues of the 2032 Summer Olympics and Paralympics =

The 2032 Summer Olympics are scheduled to be held in Brisbane, Queensland, Australia, from 23 July to 8 August 2032. The Games will be hosted in and around South East Queensland, as well as further out in Queensland. The 2032 Summer Paralympics will be held from 24 August to 5 September 2032.

Under present IOC policy (with the exception of certain venues in 2028), venues with corporate naming rights will not be allowed to use their sponsored name during the Olympics.

== Venues and infrastructure ==
Venues will be located in three main zones: Brisbane, Gold Coast and Sunshine Coast. Regional and interstate venues will also host some sports, including the football competitions.

2032 Olympic and Paralympic venues located in local government areas of South East Queensland

=== Brisbane ===
Brisbane and Greater Brisbane Venues
Venue		Olympic Events	Paralympic Events	Capacity	Status
Victoria Park	Brisbane Stadium	Ceremonies	Ceremonies	63,000	New
Victoria Park	Brisbane Stadium	Athletics (track and field)	Athletics (track and field)	63,000	New
Victoria Park	National Aquatic Centre	Aquatics (swimming, diving, water polo, artistic swimming)	Swimming	25,000 (main pool)	New
South Bank Piazza		3x3 basketball	—N/a	4,500	Existing with temporary stands
Lang Park		Football (finals)	—N/a	54,000 (after renovation)	Existing, renovated
Lang Park		Rugby sevens	—N/a	54,000 (after renovation)	Existing, renovated
Sleeman Sports Complex	Anna Meares Velodrome	Cycling (track)	Cycling (track)	1,500 (expandable to 3,500)	Existing
Sleeman Sports Complex	Brisbane SX International BMX Centre	Cycling (BMX racing)	—N/a	5,000	Existing with temporary stands
Brisbane International Shooting Centre		Shooting	Shooting	2,000 (indoor range); 2,000 (outdoor range)	Existing, renovated
Royal Queensland Golf Club		Golf	—N/a	15,000	Existing
Springfield Central Stadium		Modern pentathlon	—N/a	8,000	Existing
Brisbane Entertainment Centre		TBA	TBA	11,000	Existing
Moreton Bay Indoor Sports Centre		Boxing	TBA	10,000	New
Redland Whitewater Centre		Canoeing (slalom)	—N/a	8,000	New
Queensland Tennis Centre		Tennis	Wheelchair tennis	5,500 (Pat Rafter Arena); 4,000 (court 1); 3,000 (court 2)	Existing, renovated
The Gabba		Cricket (potential finals venue)	—N/a	37,000	Existing, renovated
Brisbane Live		TBA	TBA	17,000	New
Queensland State Netball Centre		TBA	TBA	5,000	Existing

=== Gold Coast ===
Gold Coast Venues
Venue		Olympic Events	Paralympic Events	Capacity	Status
Gold Coast Convention & Exhibition Centre	Arena	Volleyball (preliminaries)	Sitting volleyball	6,000	Existing
Gold Coast Convention & Exhibition Centre	Hall 3	Weightlifting	Powerlifting	5,000	Existing with temporary stands
Broadbeach Park Stadium		Beach volleyball	Blind football	12,000	Temporary
Gold Coast Sports and Leisure Centre		Judo	Boccia	7,500	Existing
Gold Coast Sports and Leisure Centre		Wrestling	Boccia	7,500	Existing
Southport Broadwater Parklands		Aquatics (marathon swimming)	Paratriathlon	5,000	Temporary
Southport Broadwater Parklands		Triathlon	Paratriathlon	5,000	Temporary
Gold Coast Hockey Centre		Field hockey	—N/a	TBA (pitch 1); TBA (pitch 2)	Existing with temporary stands
Gold Coast Arena		TBA	TBA	12,000	New
Coomera Indoor Sports Centre		Volleyball (preliminaries and finals)	Wheelchair rugby	11,000	Existing, renovated
Robina Stadium		Football (preliminaries)	—N/a	27,690	Existing

=== Sunshine Coast ===
Sunshine Coast Venues
Venue	Olympic Events	Paralympic Events	Capacity	Status
Sunshine Coast Stadium	Football (preliminaries)	—N/a	20,000	Existing, renovated
Sunshine Coast Indoor Sports Centre	TBA	TBA	7,000	New
Alexandra Headland	Athletics (marathon)	Athletics (marathon)	5,000	Temporary
Alexandra Headland	Cycling (road)	Cycling (road)	5,000	Temporary
Alexandra Headland	Sailing (kiteboarding)	Cycling (road)	5,000	Temporary
Sunshine Coast Mountain Bike Centre	Cycling (mountain bike)	—N/a	10,000	Existing, renovated

=== Regional Venues ===
2032 Olympic and Paralympic venues located outside of South East Queensland

Interstate and regional Queensland venues.
City	Venue	Olympic Events	Paralympic Events	Capacity	Status
Logan City	Logan Indoor Sports Centre	TBA	TBA	7,000	New
Maryborough	TBA	Archery	Archery	4,000	Temporary
Toowoomba	Toowoomba Showgrounds	Equestrian	Equestrian	TBA	Existing with temporary stands
Townsville	North Queensland Stadium	Football (preliminaries)	—N/a	25,455	Existing
Townsville	TBA	Sailing	—N/a	TBA	Existing
Whitsunday Islands		Sailing	—N/a	TBA	Existing
Cairns	Barlow Park	Football (preliminaries)	—N/a	20,000	Existing, renovated
Cairns	Cairns Convention Centre	TBA	TBA	5,300	Existing
Rockhampton	Fitzroy River	Canoeing (sprint)	Paracanoe	TBA	Existing with temporary stands
Rockhampton	Fitzroy River	Rowing	Rowing	TBA	Existing with temporary stands
Mackay	Harrup Park	Cricket (potential preliminary venue)	—N/a	10,000	Existing, renovated

=== Outlying venues ===
1956 Summer Olympics Host City Melbourne and 2000 Summer Olympics Host City, Sydney.
City	Venue	Olympic Events	Paralympic Events	Capacity	Status
Sydney	Sydney Football Stadium	Football (preliminaries)	—N/a	42,500	Existing
Melbourne	Melbourne Rectangular Stadium	Football (preliminaries)	—N/a	30,050	Existing

=== Non-competitive ===
Interstate and regional Queensland venues.
Venue	Usage	Capacity	Status
Bowen Hills, Brisbane Showgrounds	Brisbane Olympic and Paralympic Village	10,000	New
Royal Pines, Benowa	Gold Coast Olympic and Paralympic Village	2,600	New
Maroochydore	Sunshine Coast Olympic and Paralympic Village	TBA	New
Brisbane Convention & Exhibition Centre	Main Press Centre	—N/a	Existing
Visy Glass factory, West End	International Broadcast Centre	—N/a	Temporary
Brisbane Riverstage	Festival / Live Site	9,500	Existing

== Gallery of venues ==
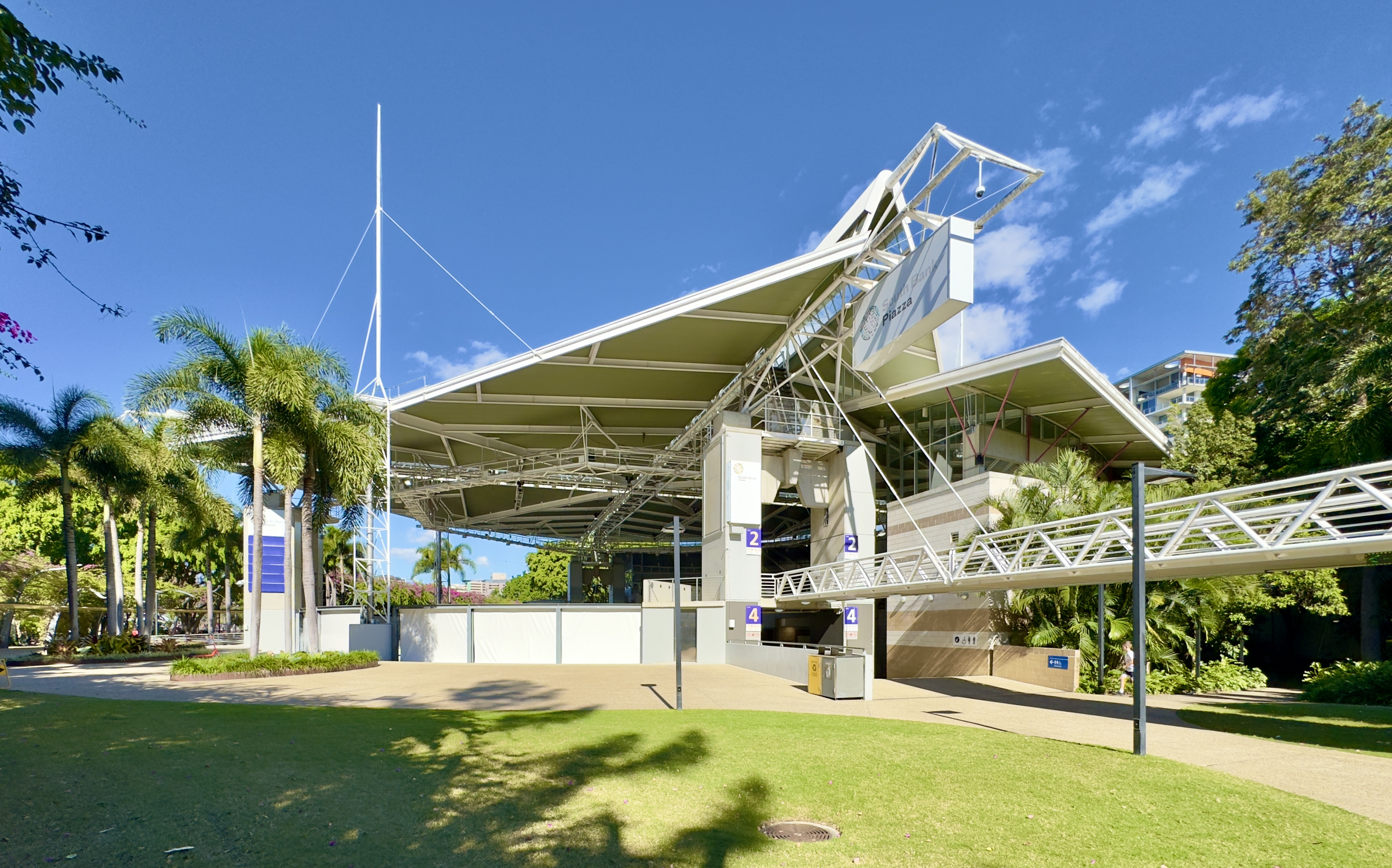
South Bank Piazza

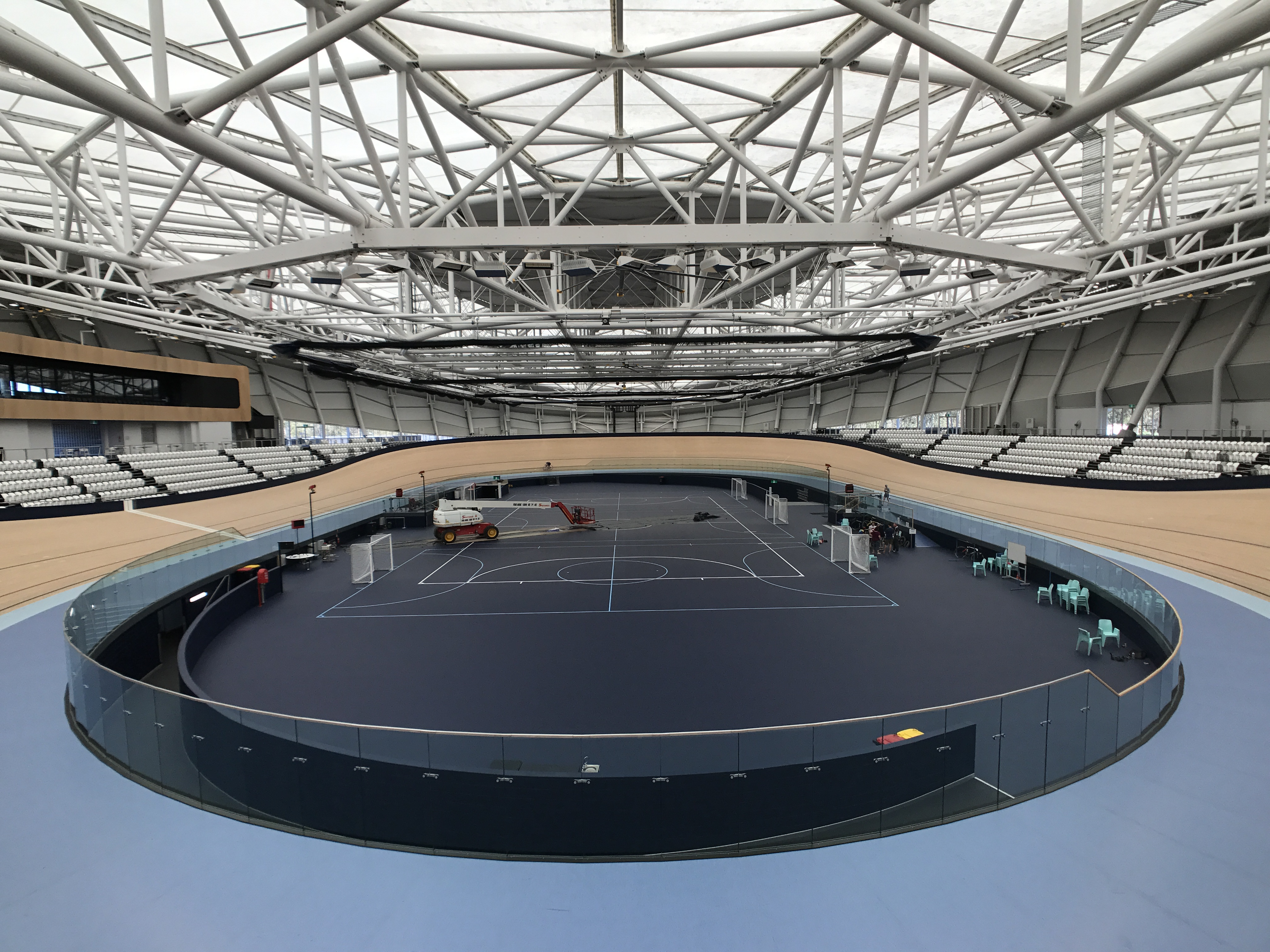
Anna Meares Velodrome

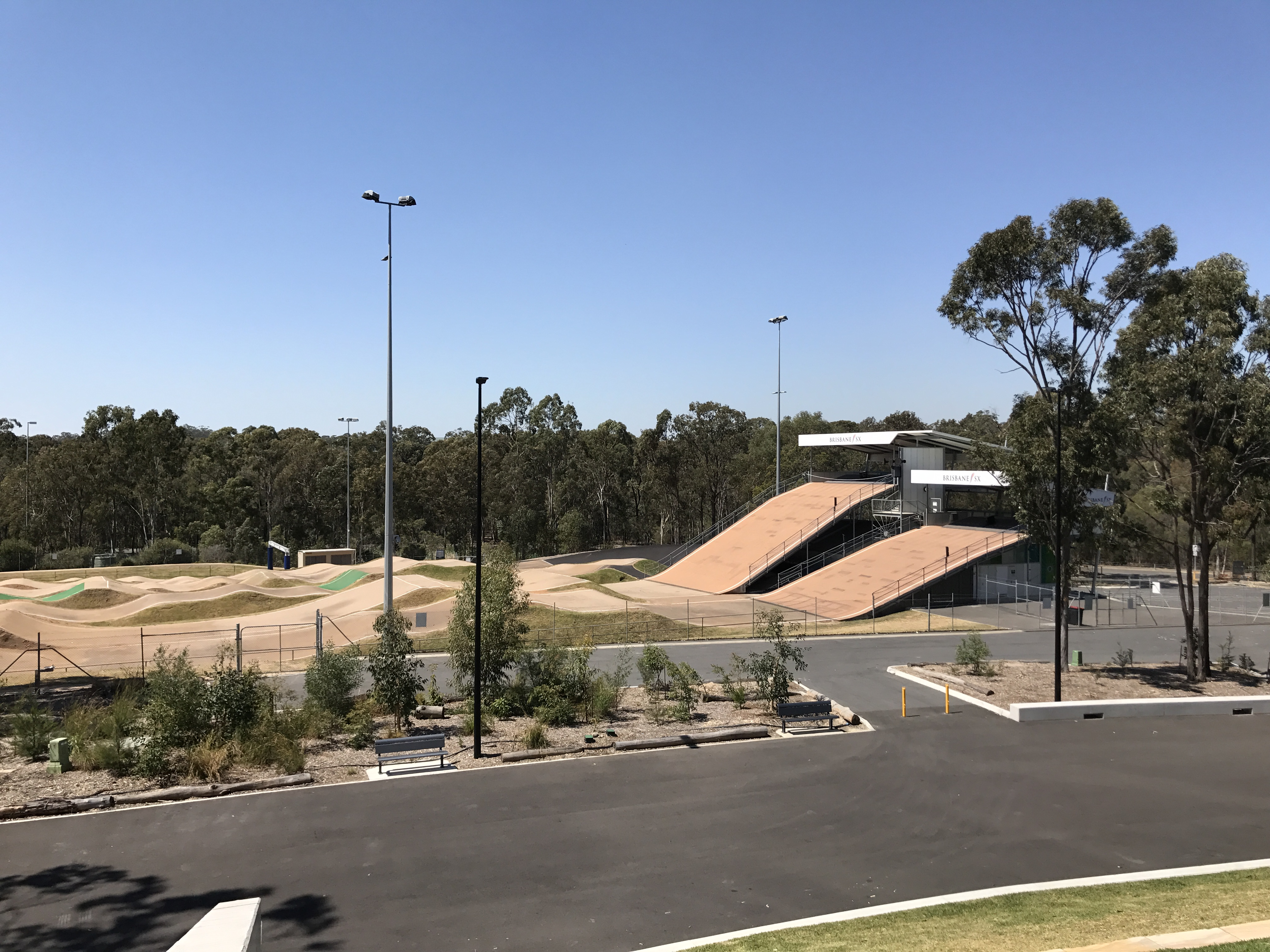
Sleeman BMX SuperCross Track

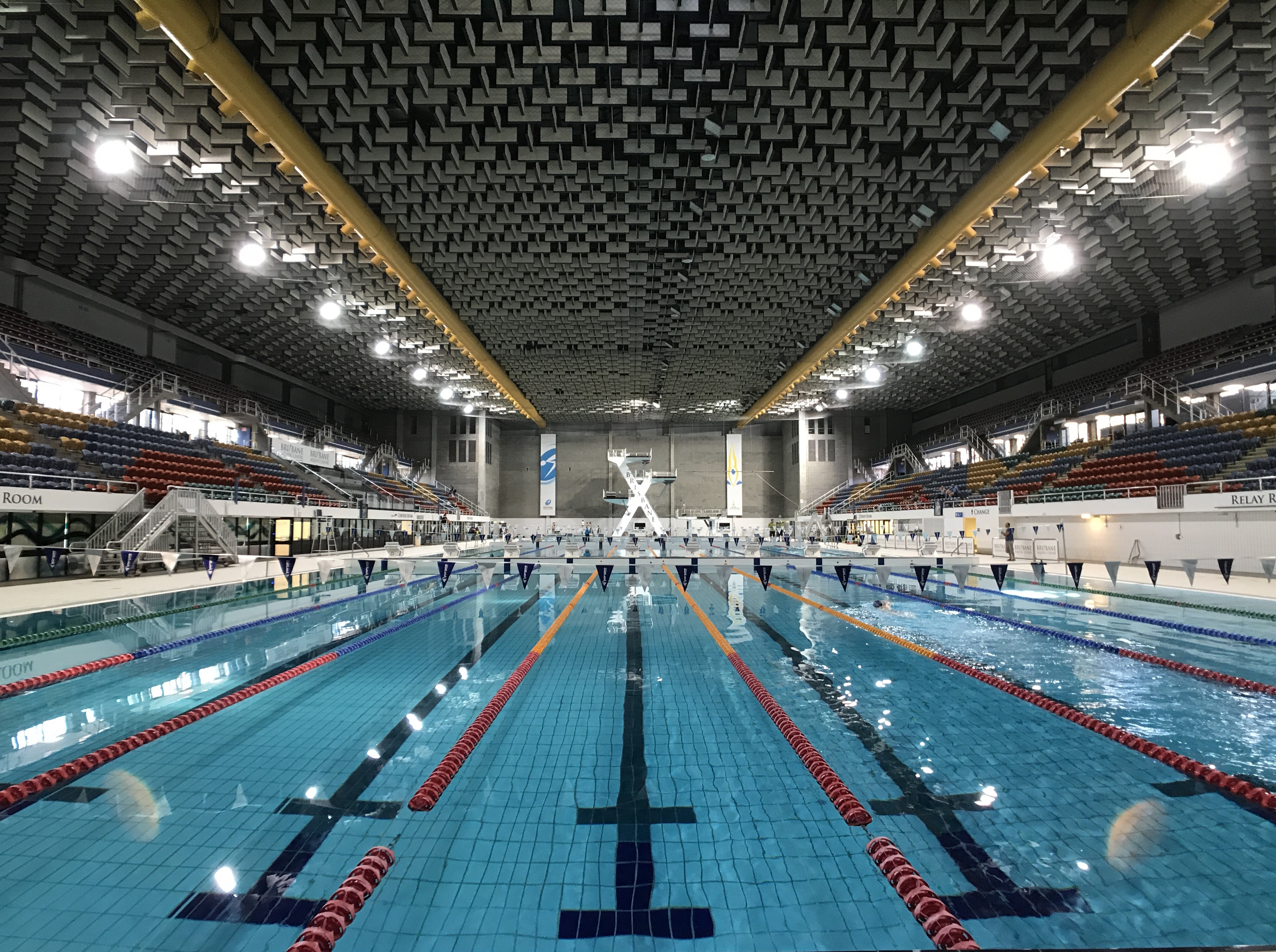
Brisbane Aquatics Centre

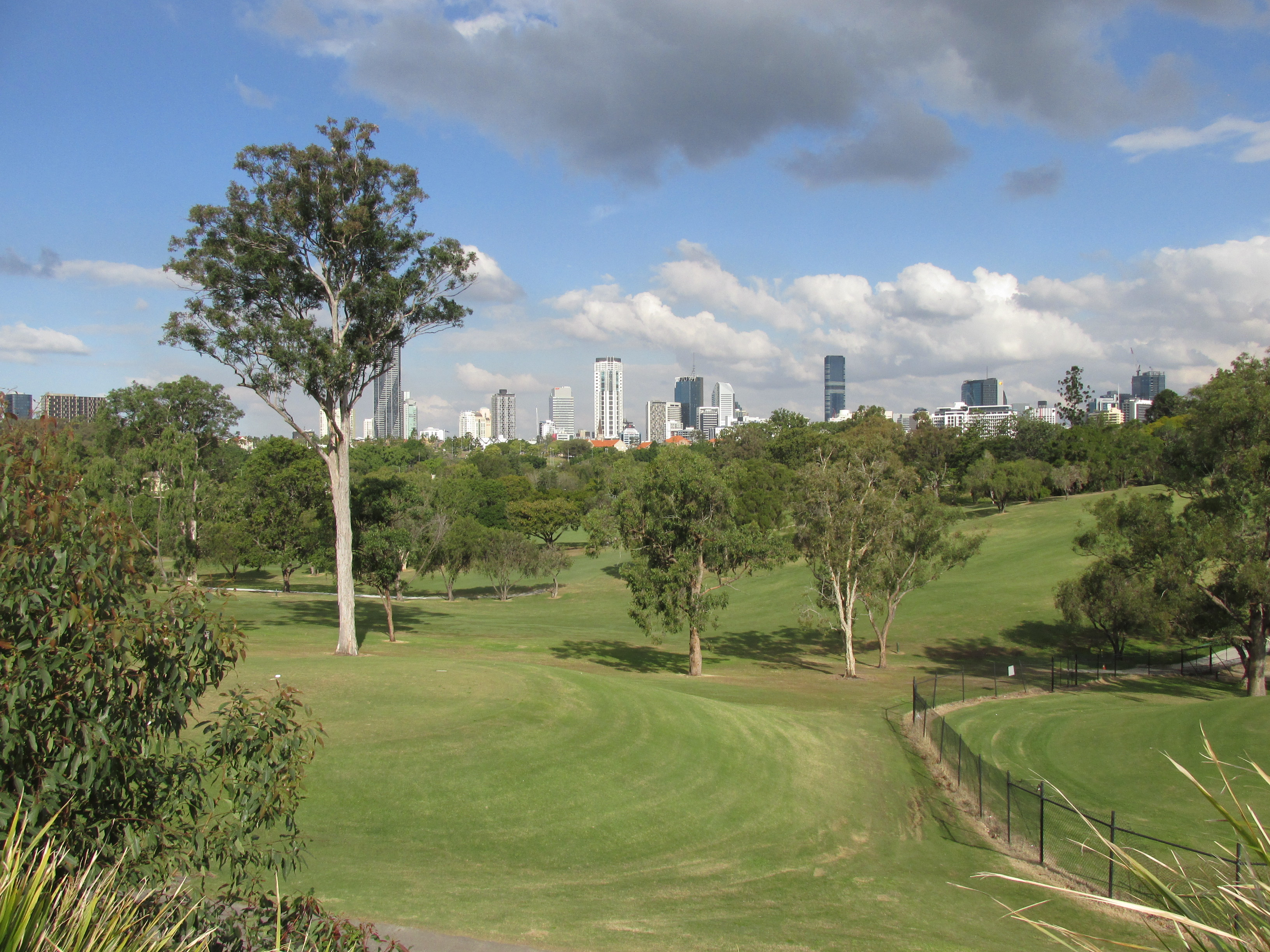
Barrambin / Victoria Park

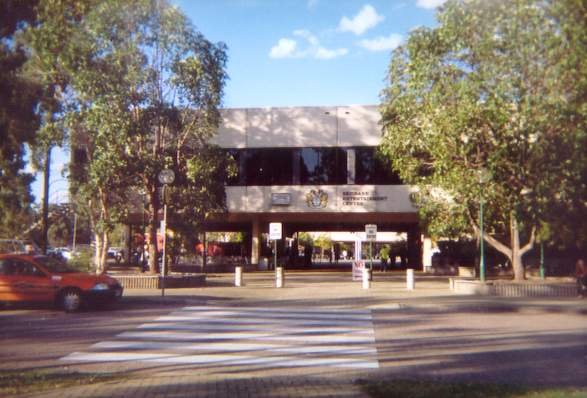
Brisbane Entertainment Centre

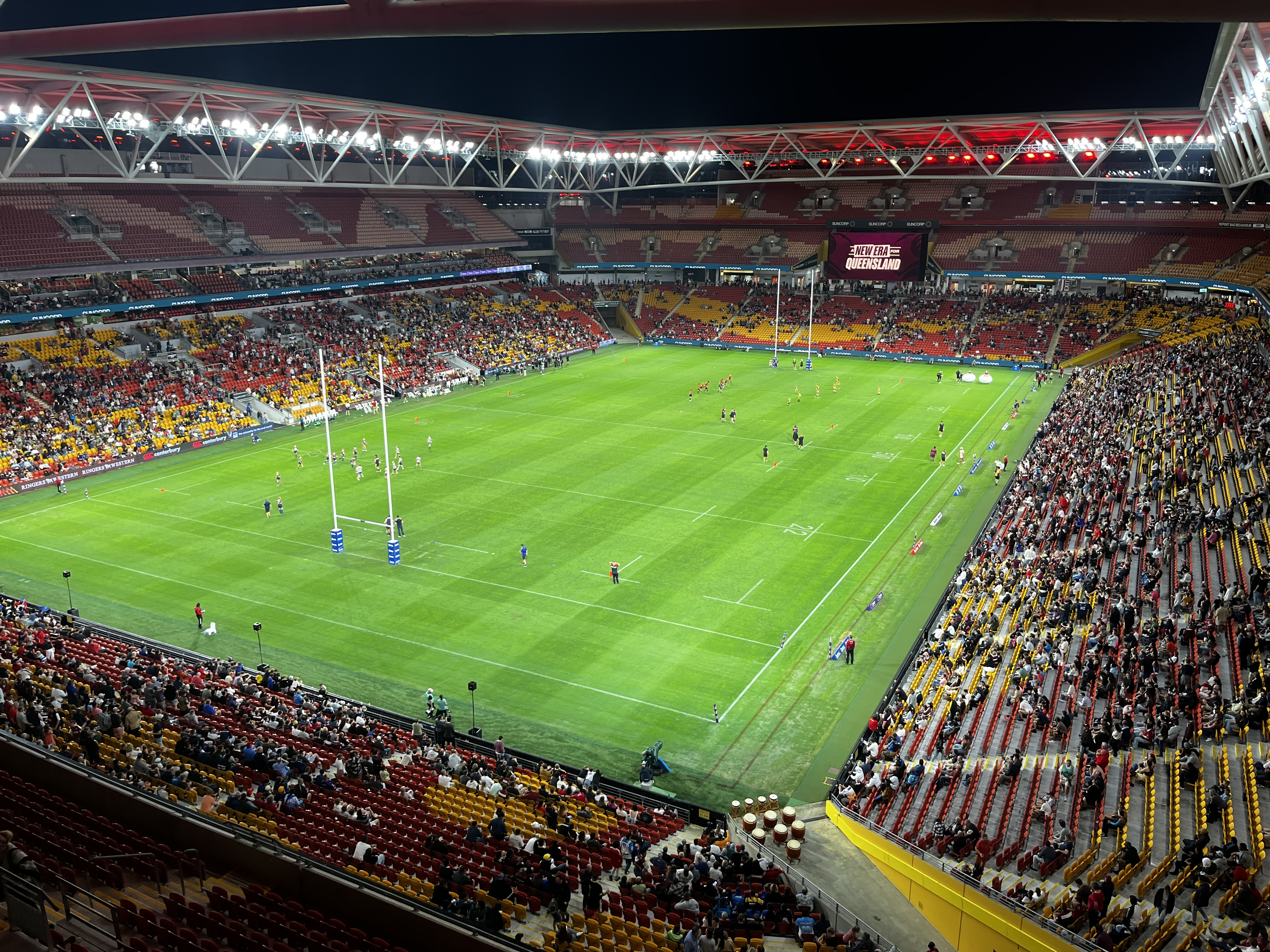
Brisbane Stadium

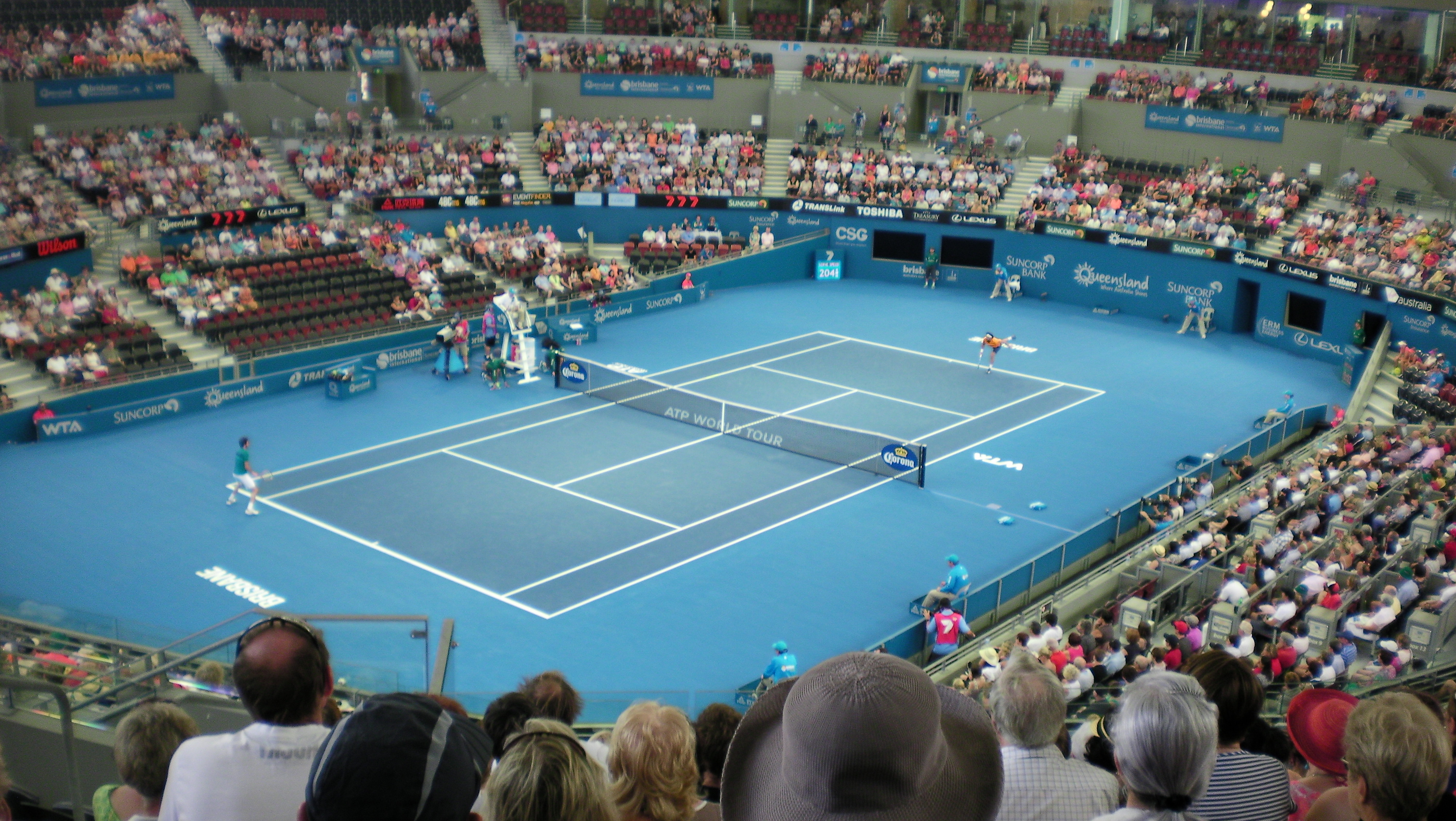
Queensland Tennis Centre

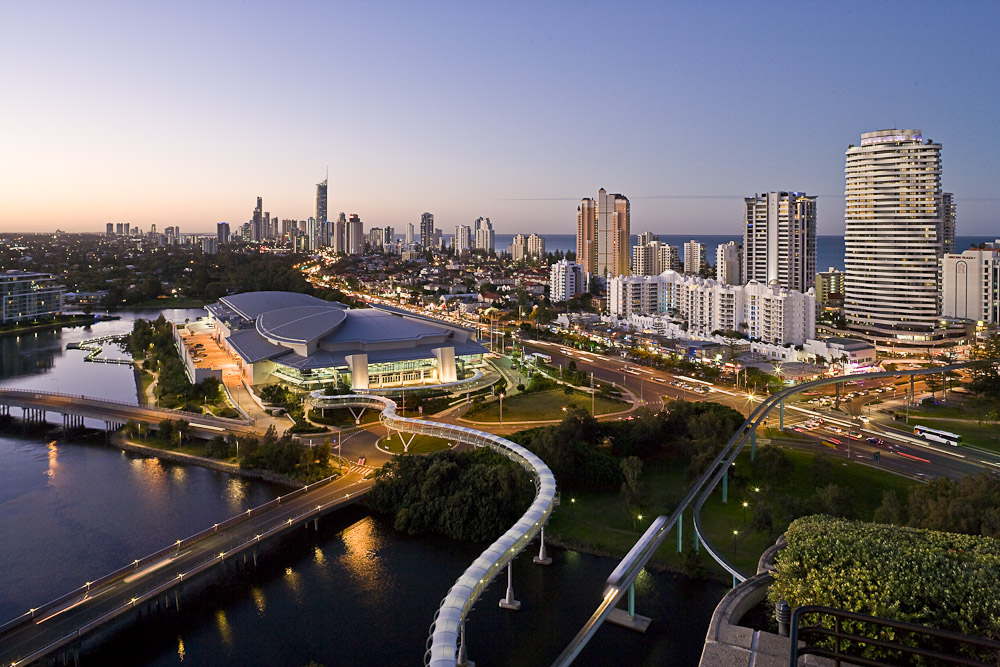
Gold Coast Convention & Exhibition Centre

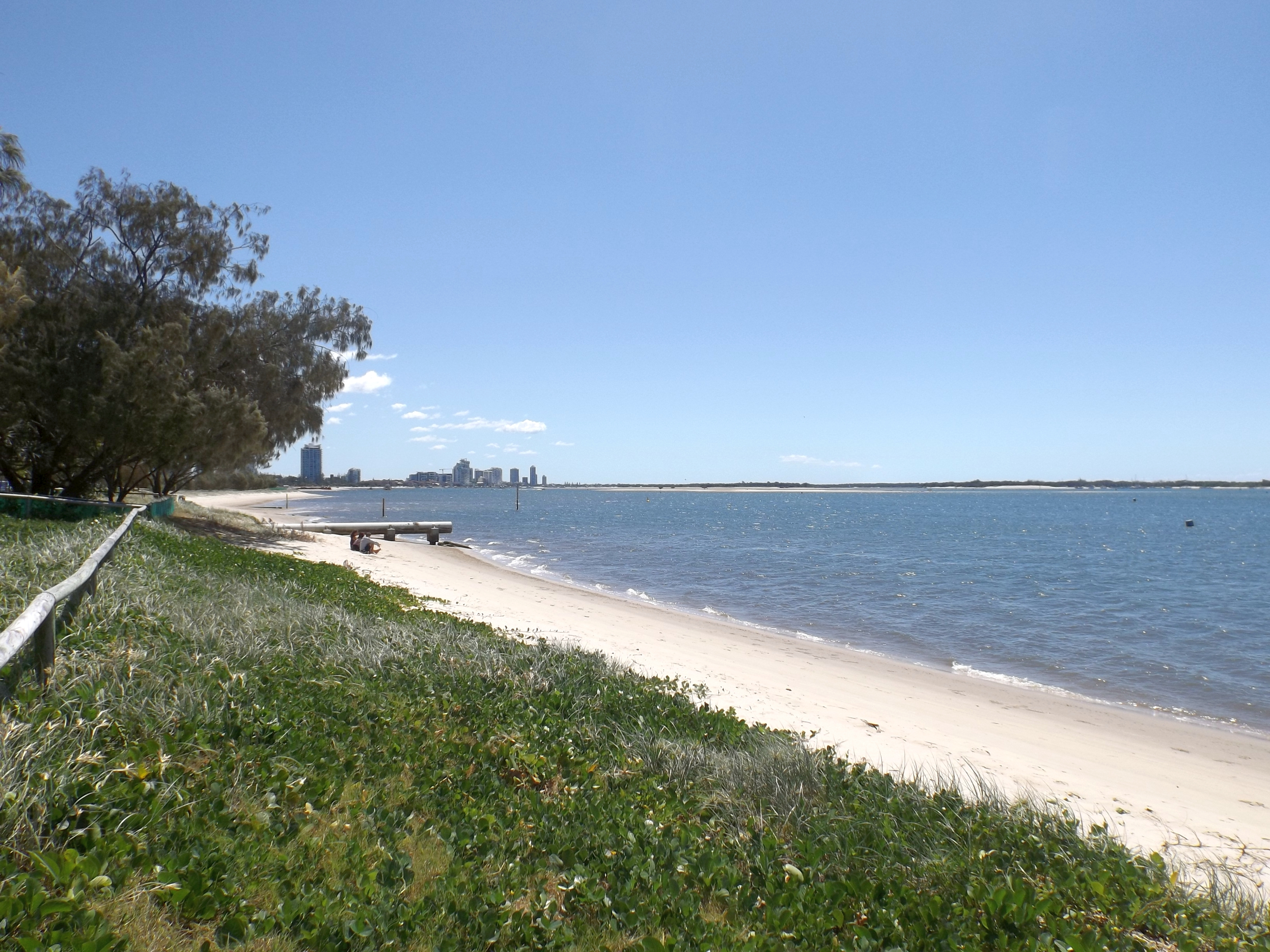
Southport Broadwater Parklands

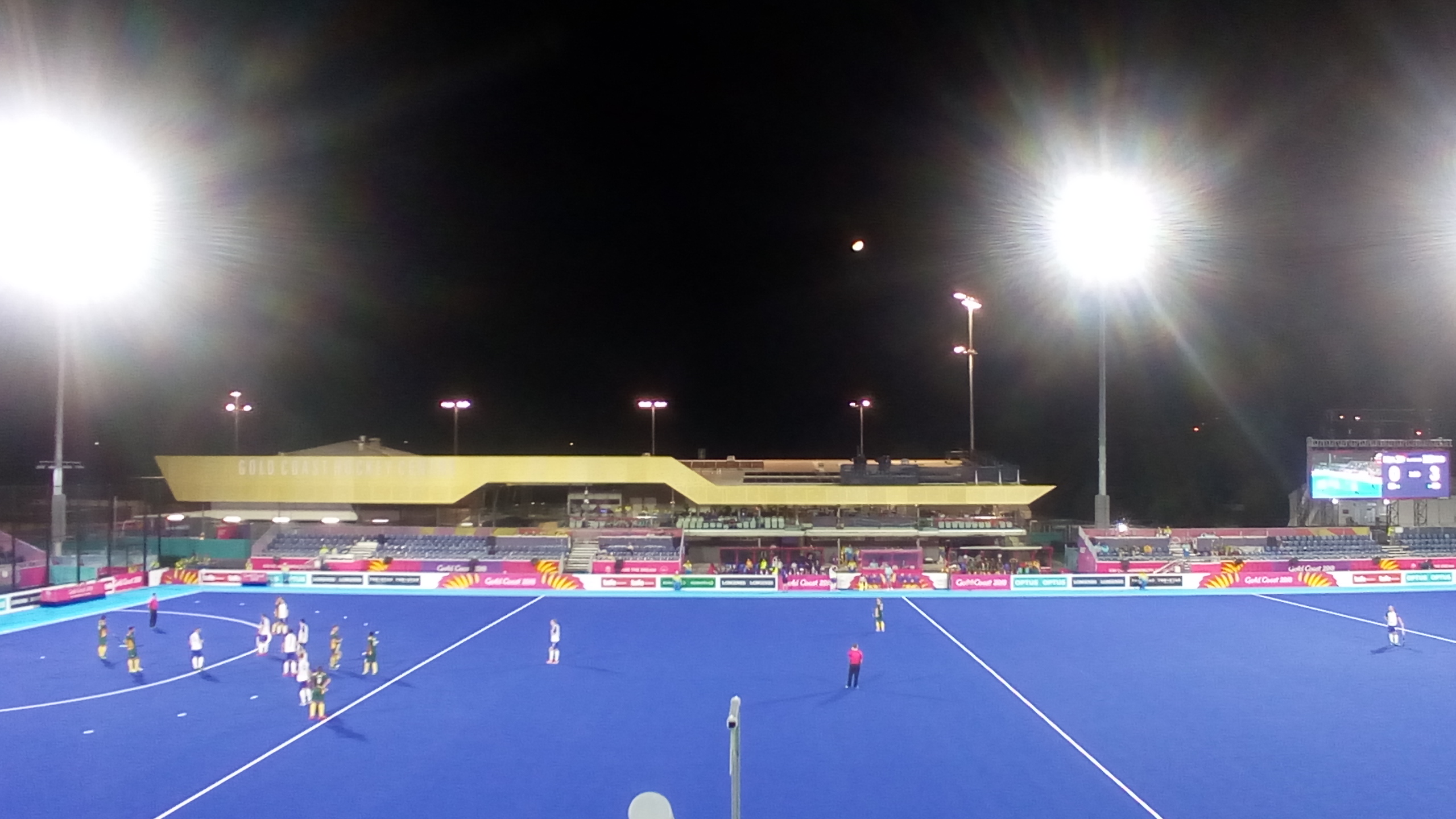
Gold Coast Hockey Centre

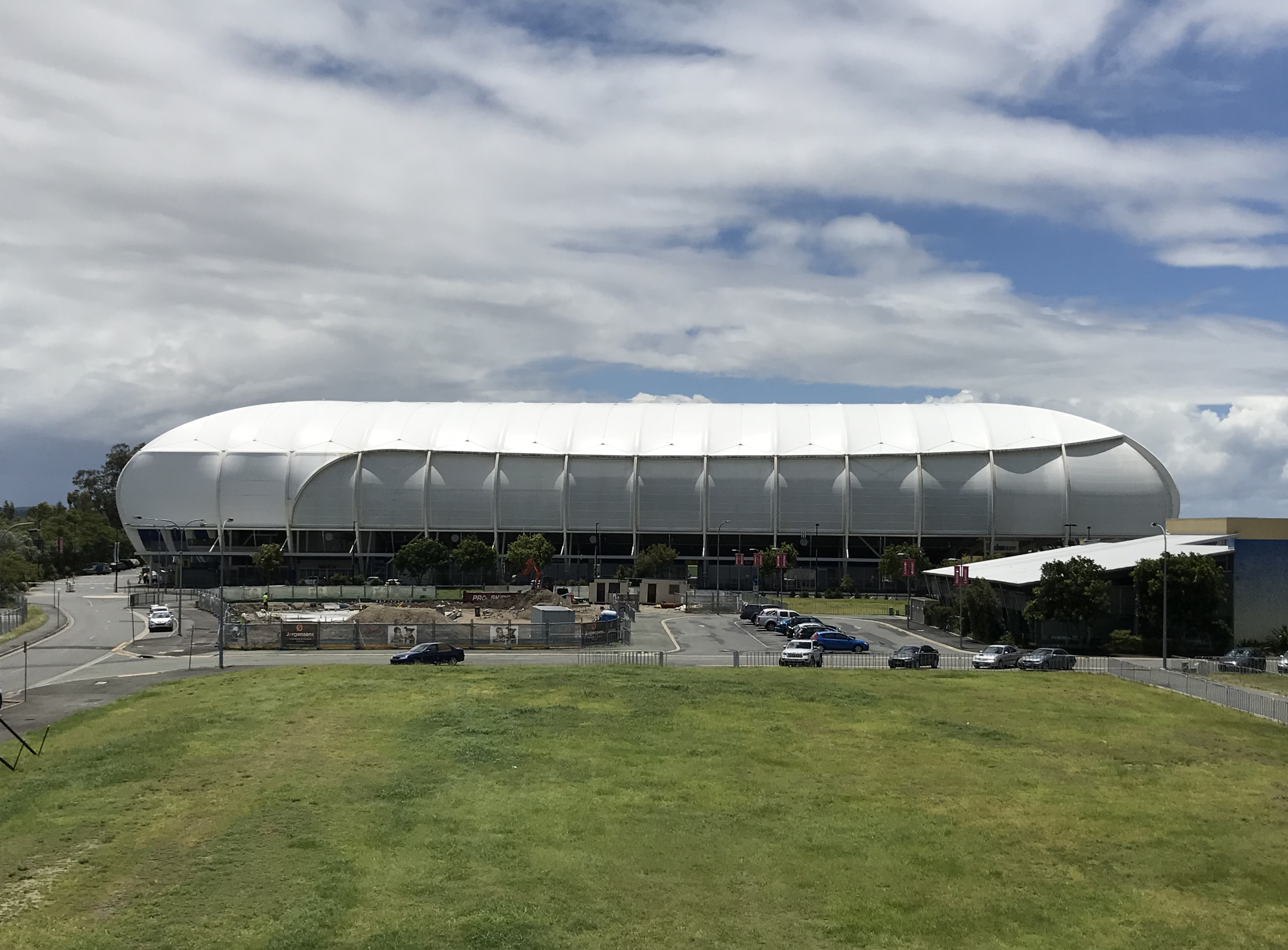
Robina Stadium

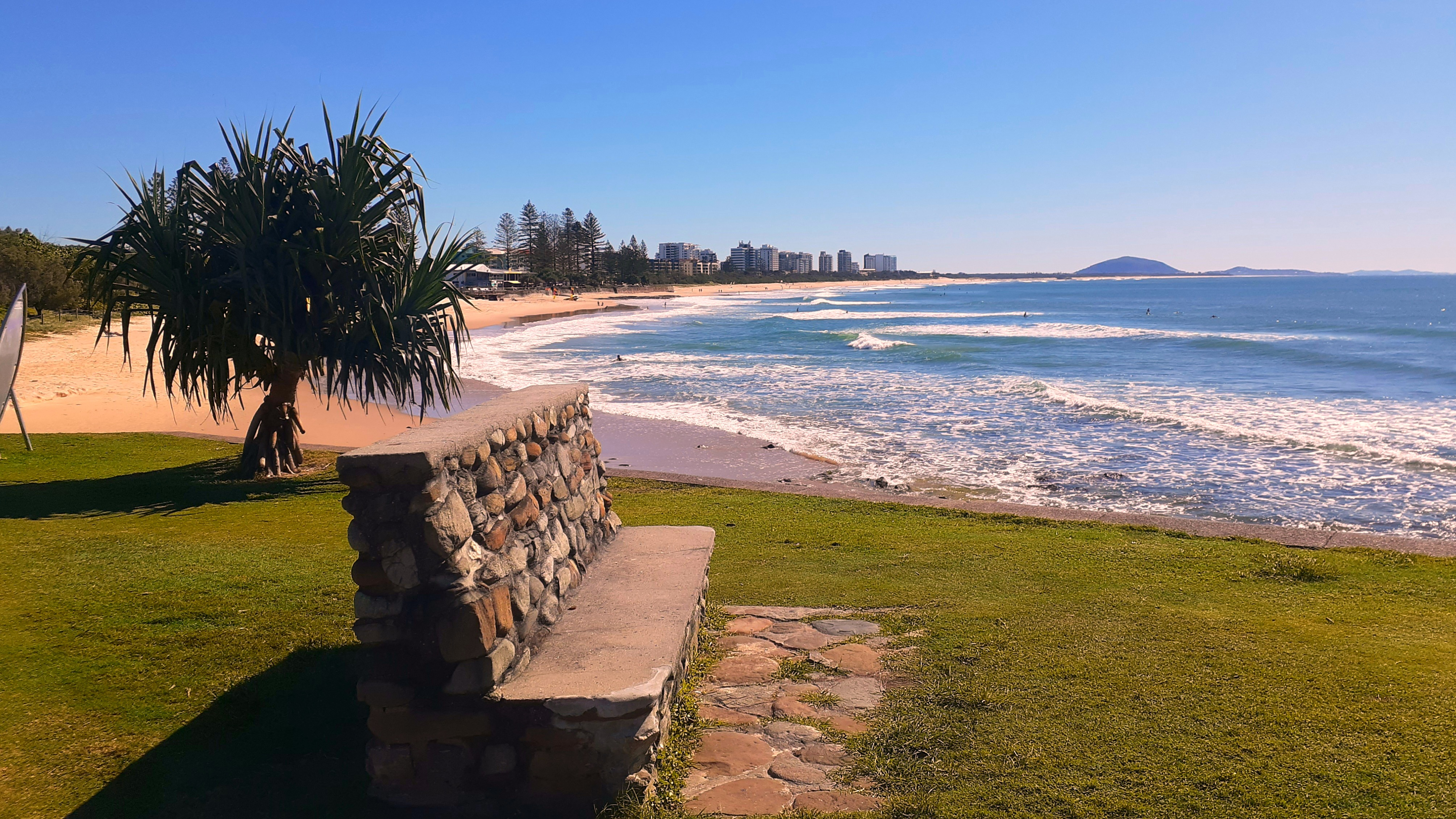
Alexandra Headland

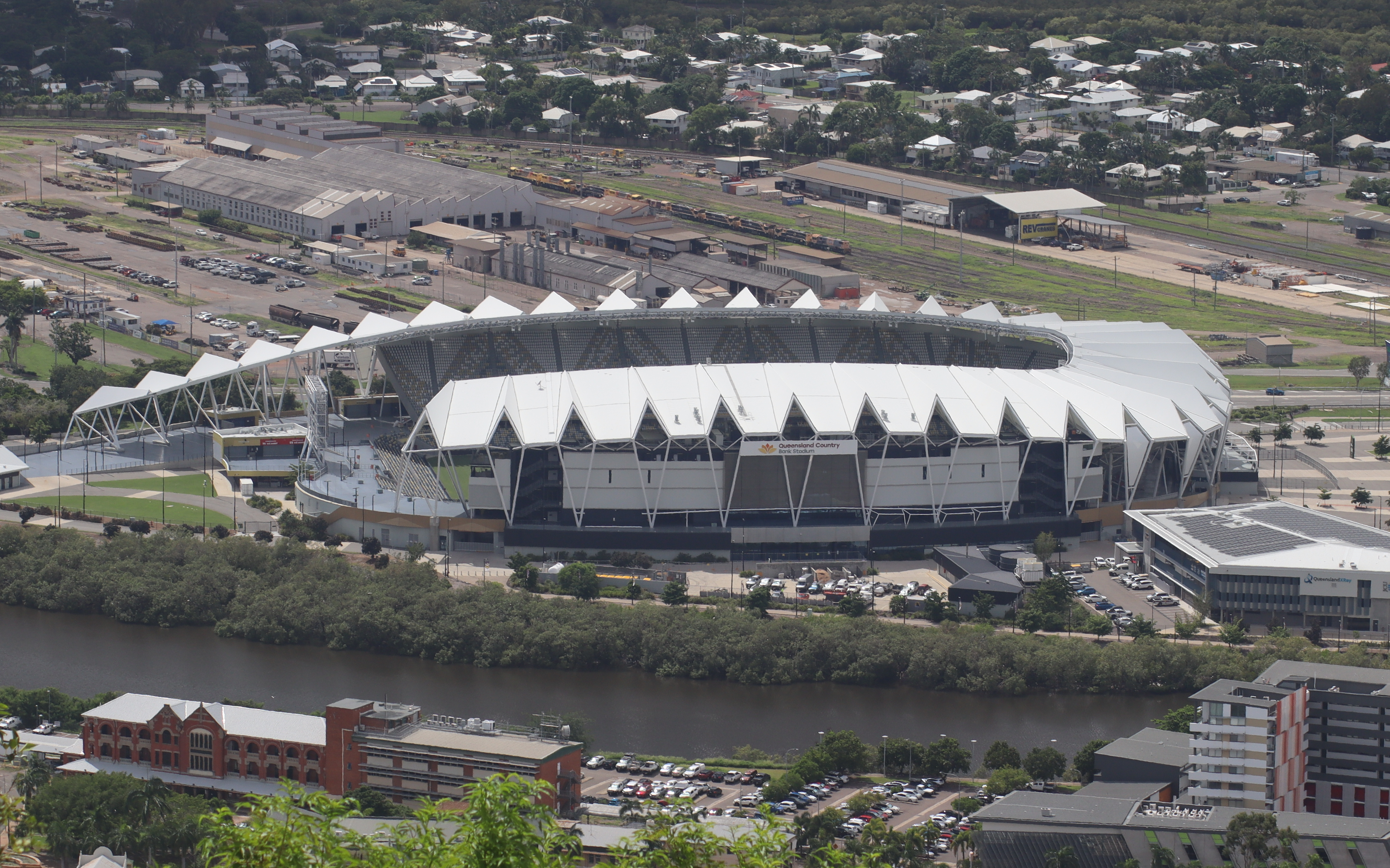
Townsville Stadium

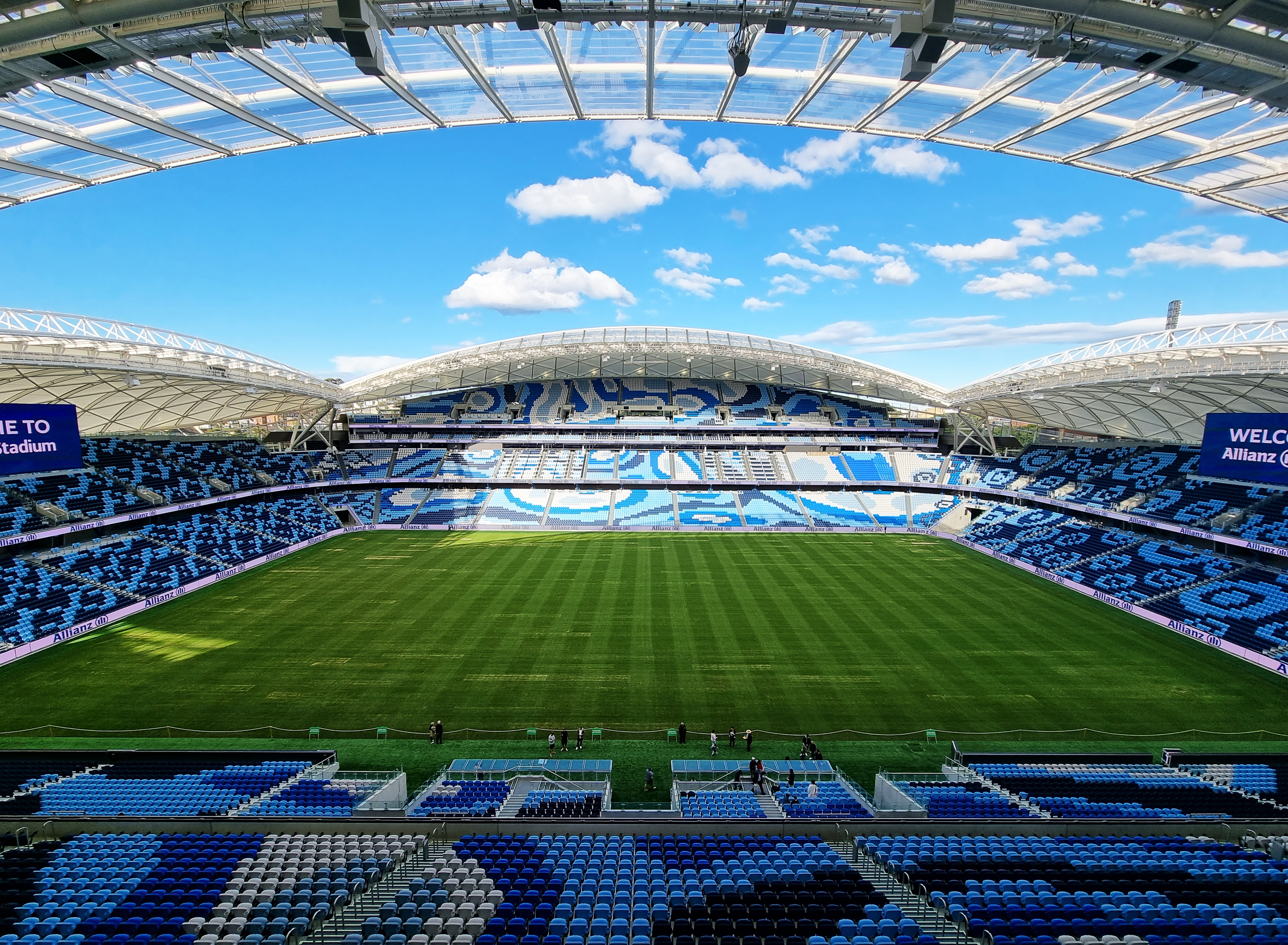
Sydney Football Stadium

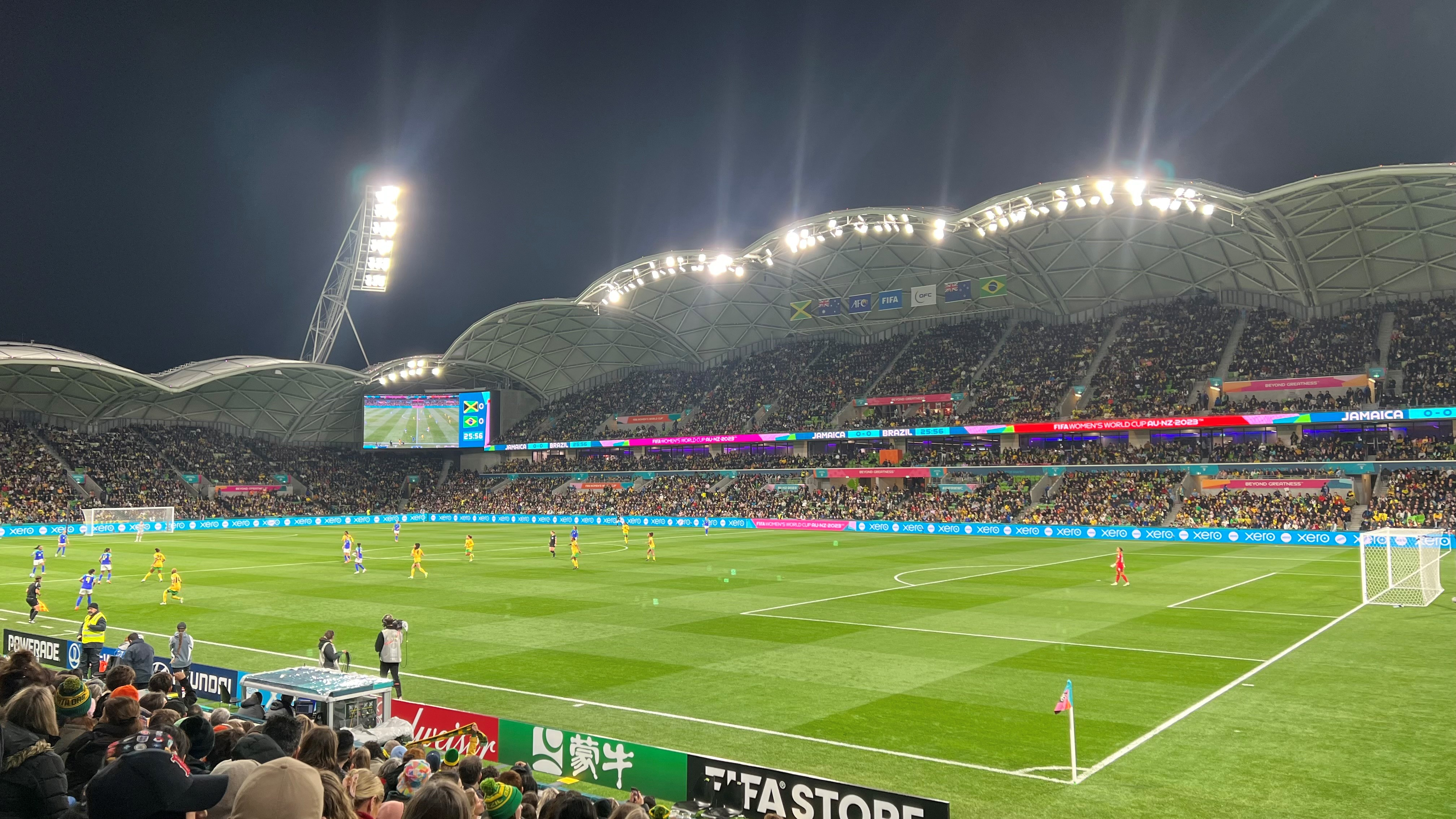
Melbourne Rectangular Stadium

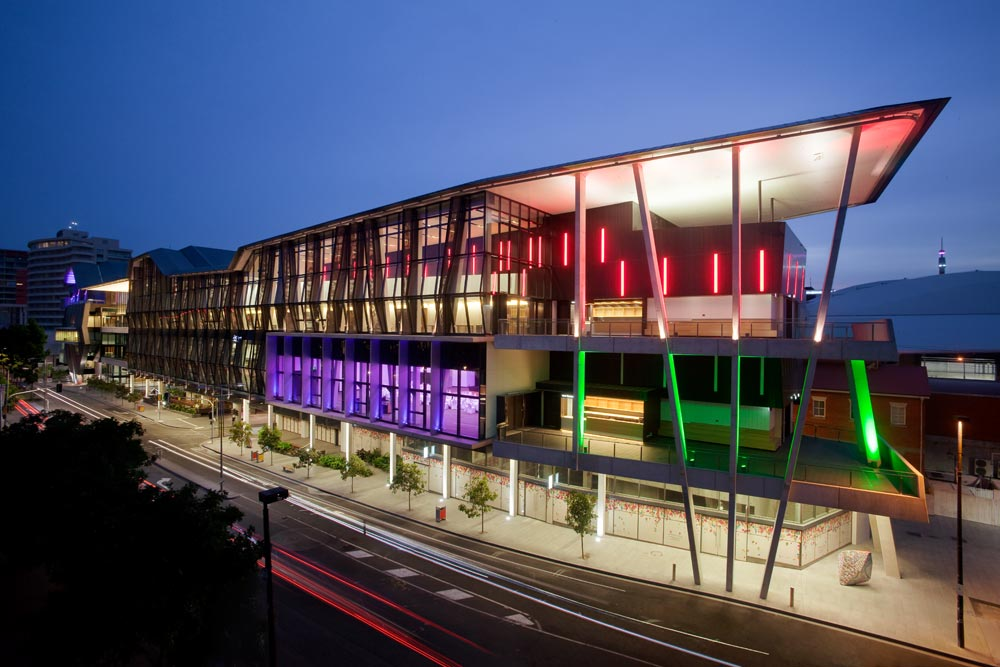
Brisbane Convention & Exhibition Centre

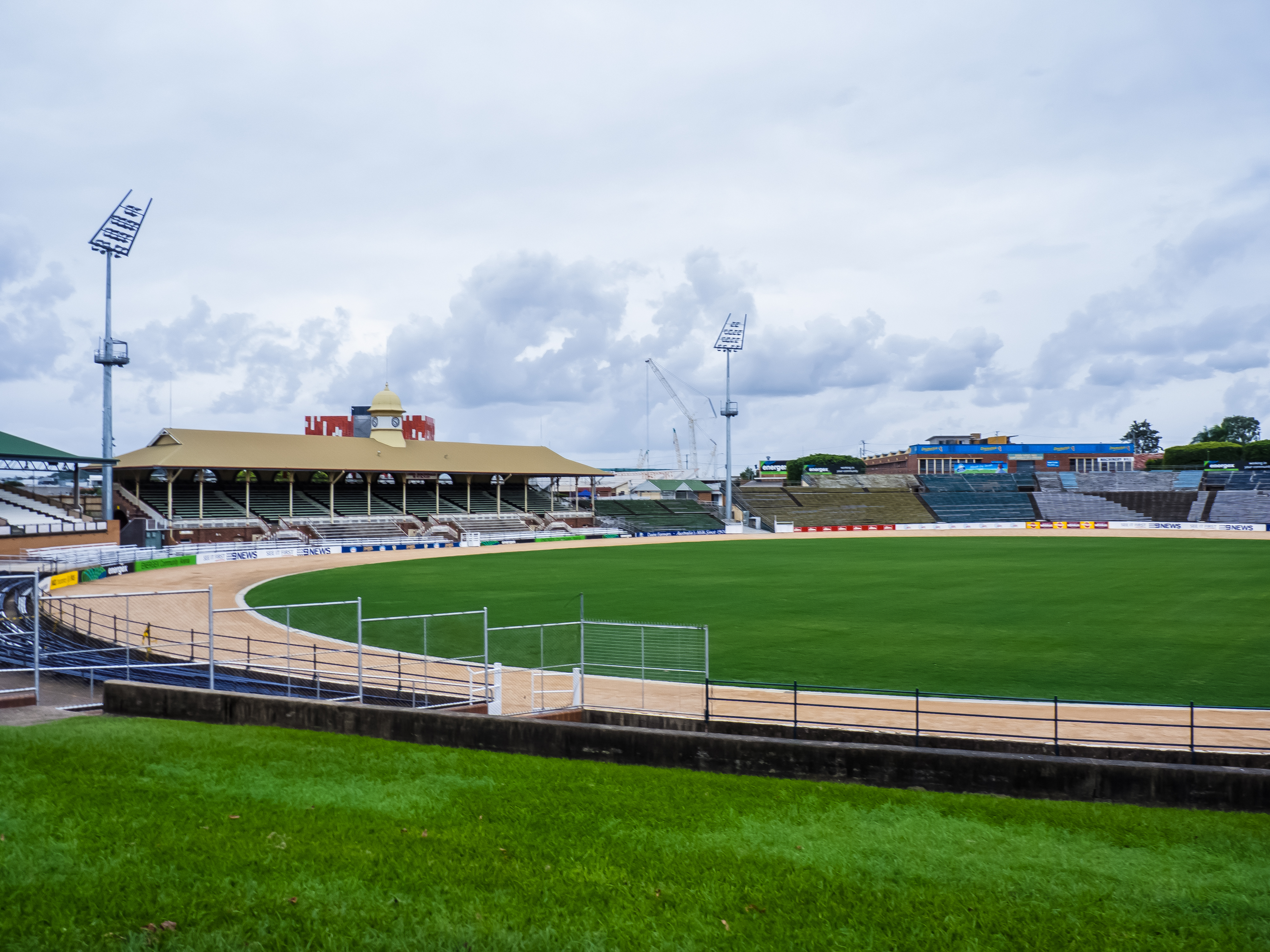
Brisbane Showgrounds

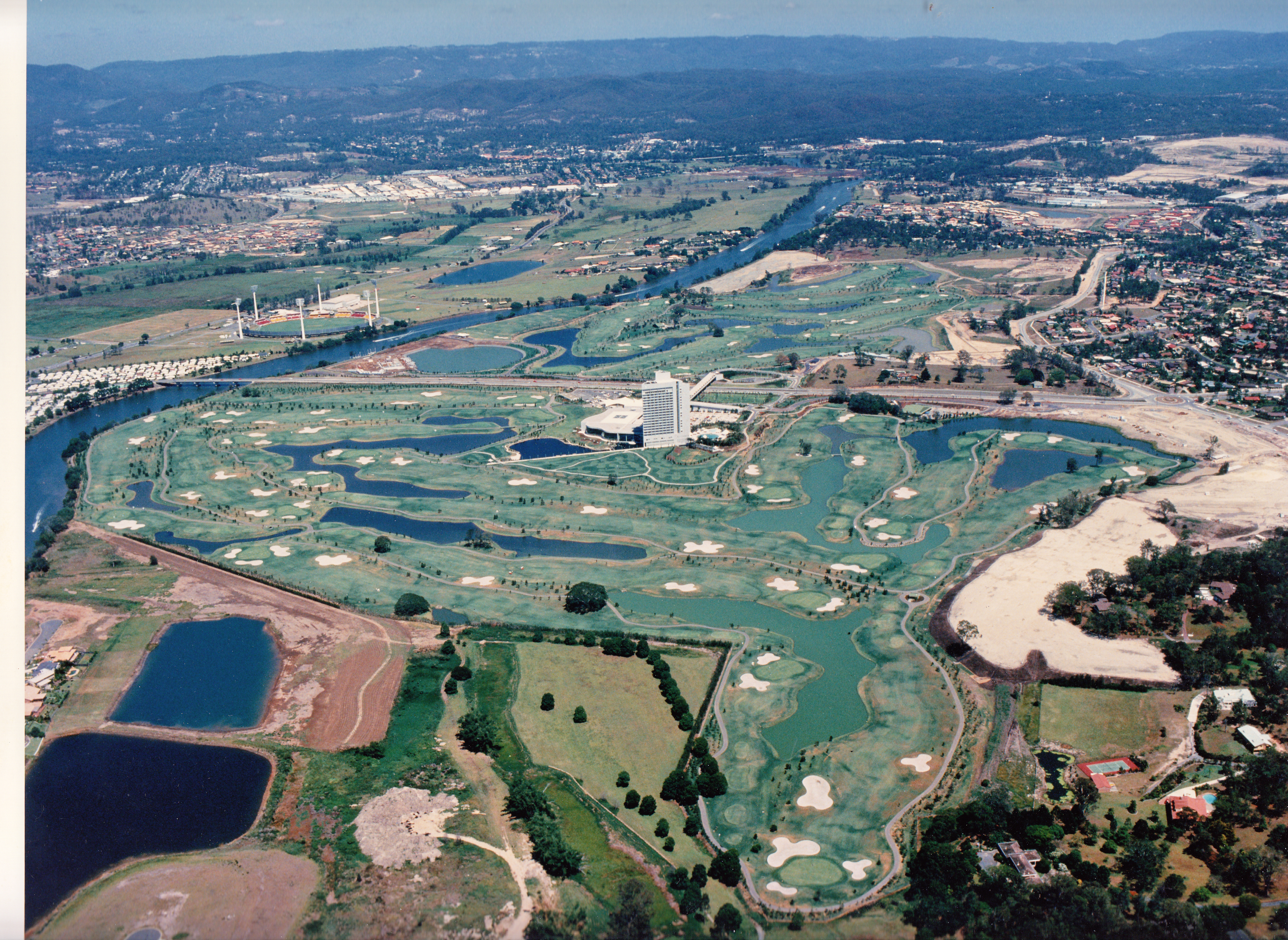
Royal Pines

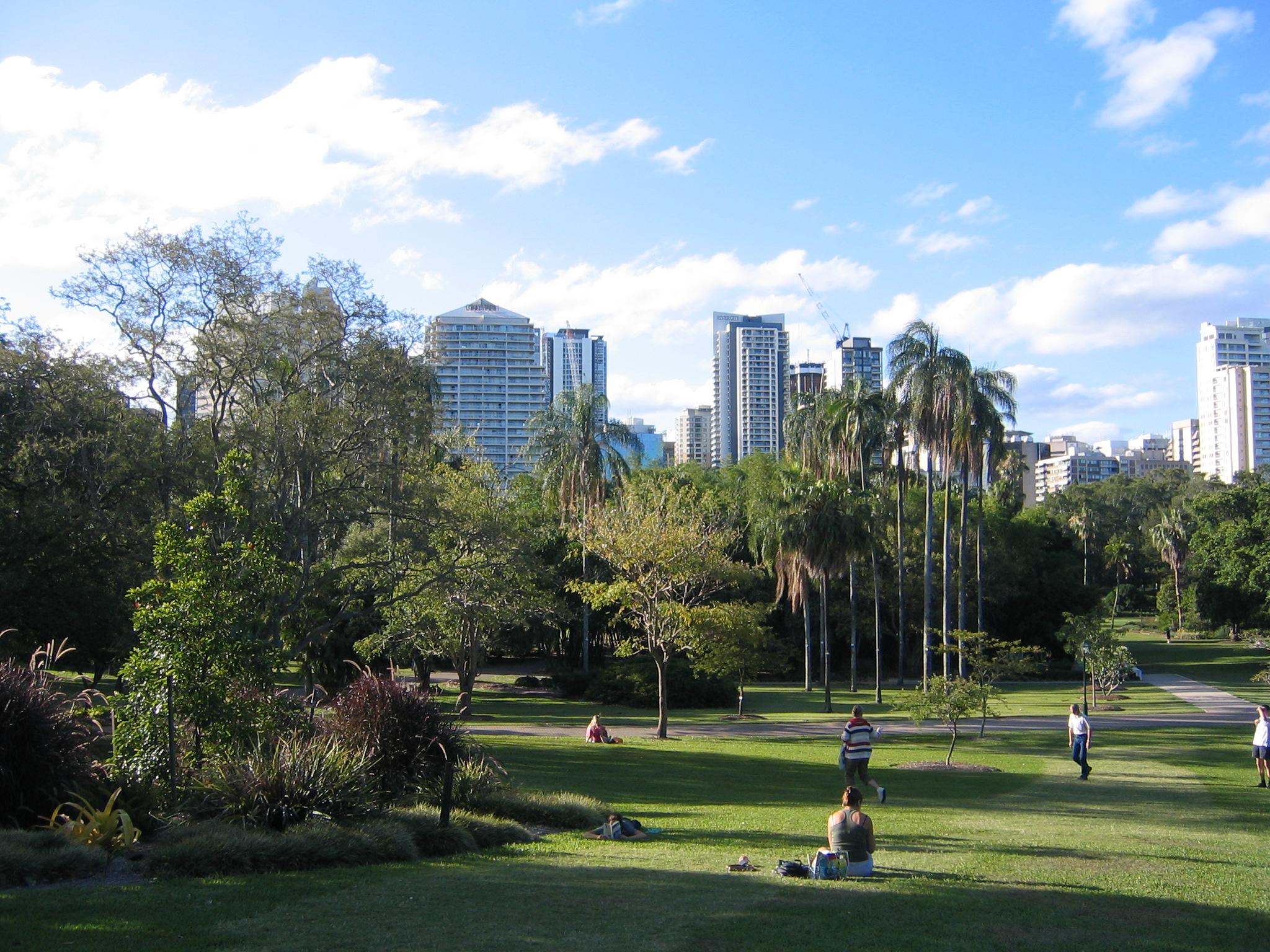
Brisbane Riverstage
