= Riverstage =

Outdoor entertainment venue in Brisbane, Australia

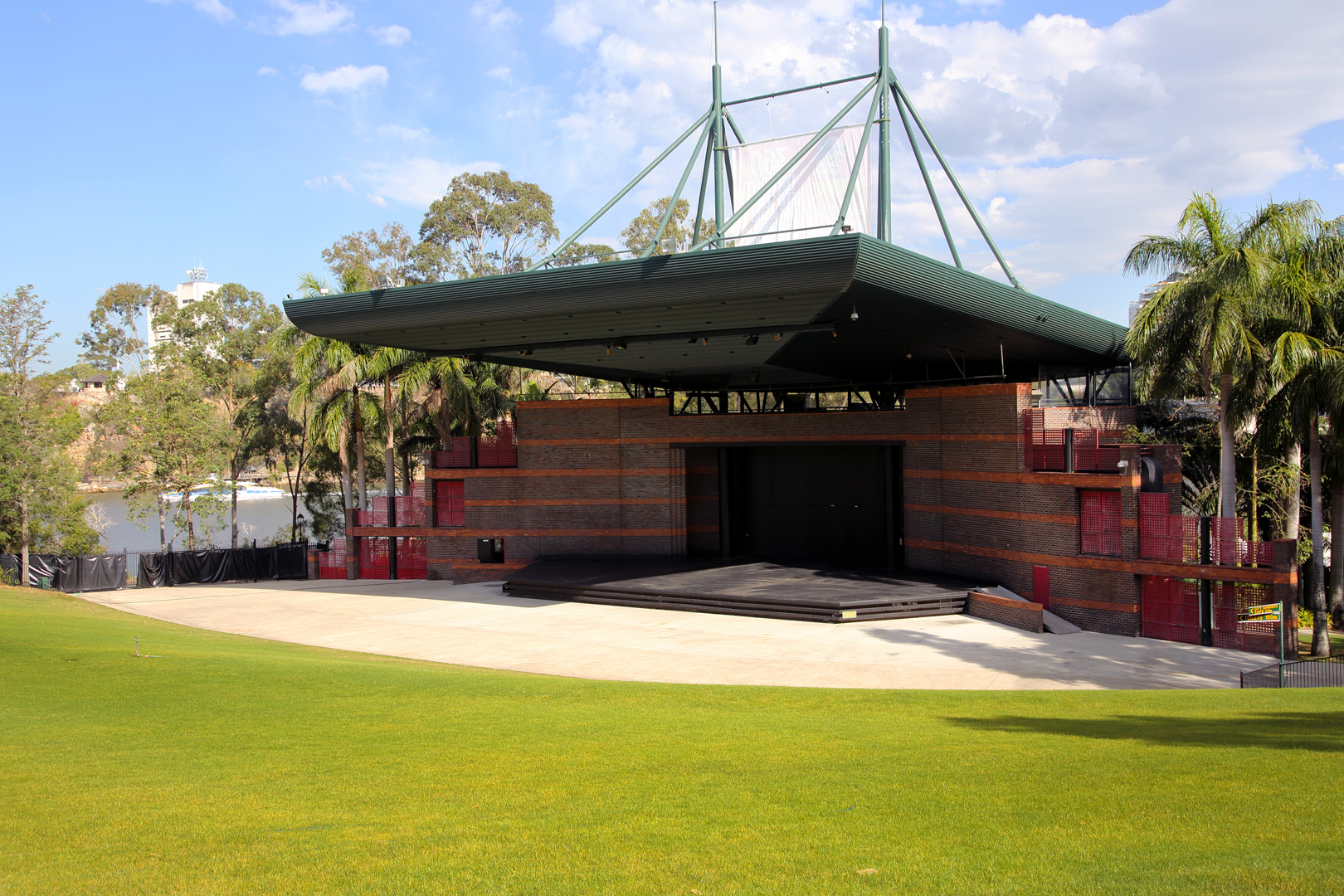
- Interactive map of Riverstage
- Location: 59 Gardens Point Road, Brisbane, Queensland, Australia
- Coordinates: 27°28′44.40″S 153°1′48.29″E
- Owner: Brisbane City Council
- Capacity: 9,500
- Surface: Concrete, grass

Construction
- Opened: 7 September 1989

Website
- Riverstage online

Riverstage is an outdoor entertainment venue in Brisbane, Australia. The venue occupies a 2 ha site within the City Botanic Gardens and has a capacity of 9,500. The Brisbane Festival makes regularly use of the venue. Riverstage regularly features local, national and international concerts, including large-scale music concerts, as well as family and community events.

Concert goers often bring a blanket to sit on. When the site reaches full capacity a live screening area adjacent to the Riverstage may be used.

== History ==
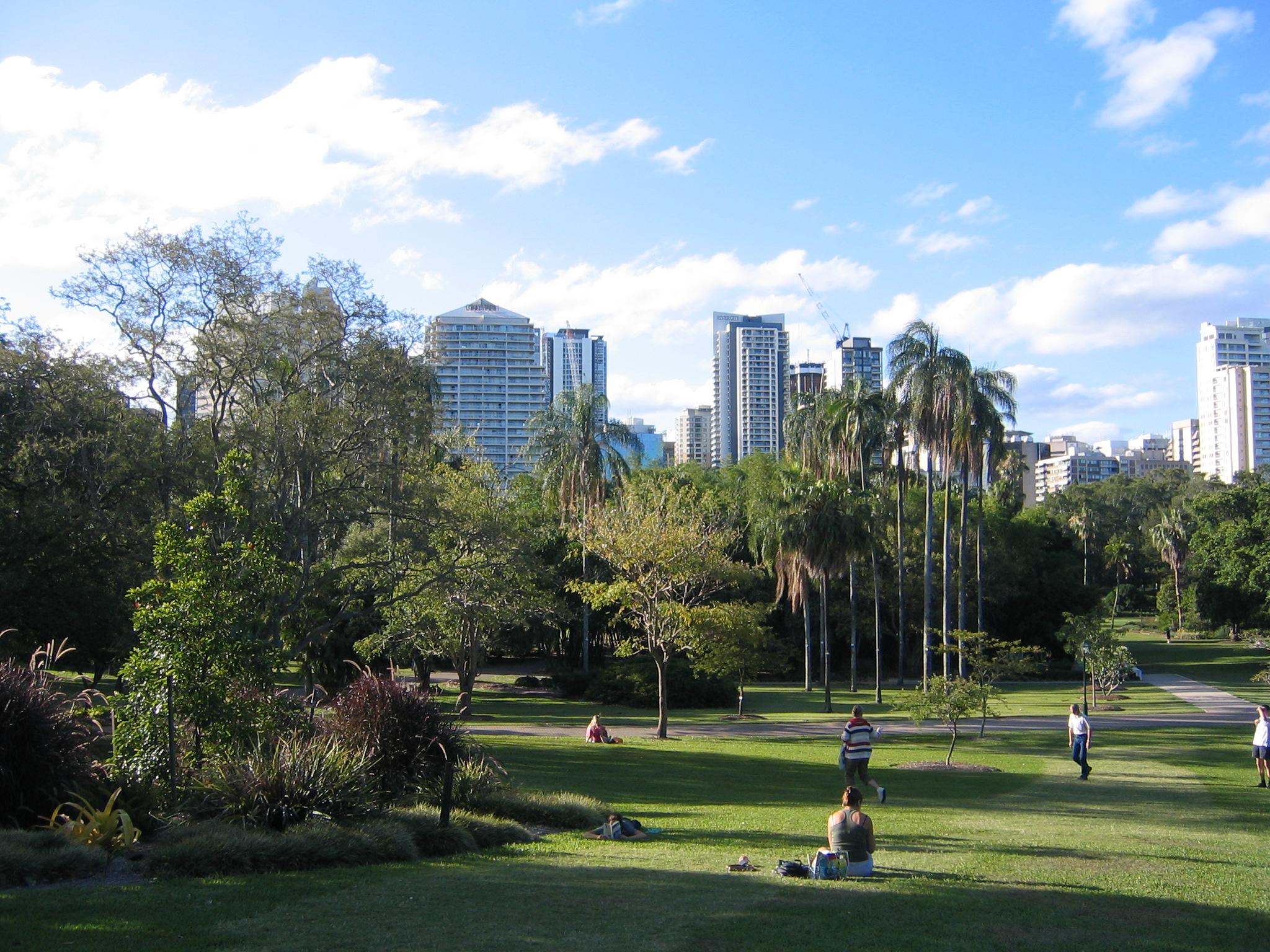
Riverstage is located within the City Botanic Gardens

Riverstage was officially opened on 7 September 1989 by Lord Mayor of Brisbane, Sallyanne Atkinson. It was inspired by the temporary Riverstage used for World Expo '88 a year earlier. The venue formerly hosted the touring Soundwave festival; having its first show there in 2007 and returning in 2008. Brisbane band Powderfinger performed their final show at the venue in November 2010.

Some of the most notable performances at Riverstage is the annual Carols by Candlelight event held every December and Daft Punk's Alive 2006–2007 Tour which they performed in December 2007. In 2011, a Queensland Relief Concert was held in which the Foo Fighters played to a sold-out crowd. The benefit concert was held in aid of victims of the 2010–2011 Queensland floods. Gigantour used the stage on multiple occasions.

Because of the open nature of site, attendees to a Tate McRae concert in November 2024 were evacuated to a nearby carpark due to intense lightning activity caused by the storms.

== See also ==
- List of contemporary amphitheaters
- List of music venues
- Popular entertainment in Brisbane
- Venues of the 2032 Summer Olympics and Paralympics
