= Kristin Kloster Aasen =

Norwegian sports executive

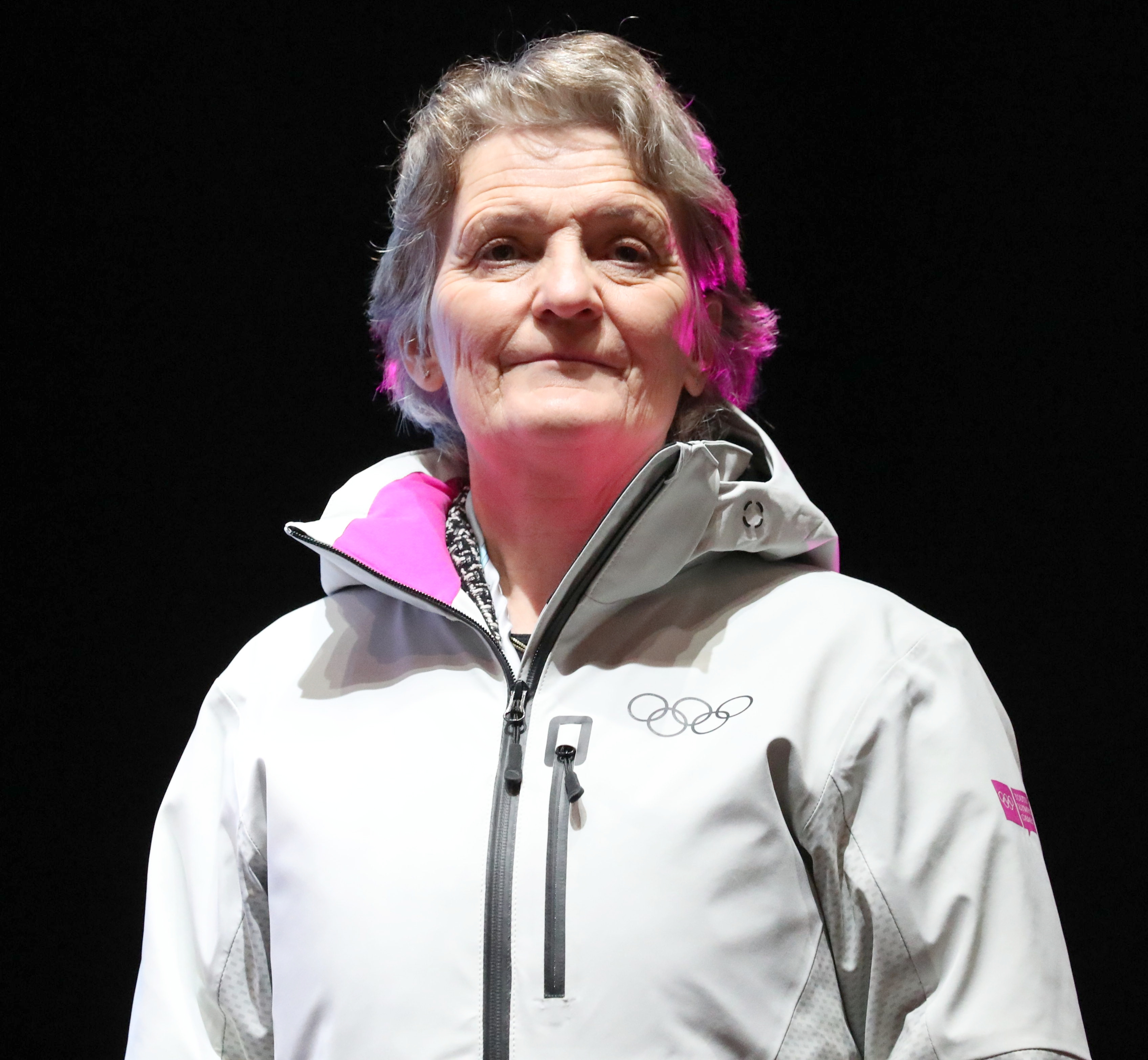

Vice president of Norwegian Olympic and Paralympic Committee and Confederation of Sports
- In office 2015–2019

Personal details
- Born: Kristin Kloster; 4 January 1961 (age 65)

Kristin Kloster Aasen (born 4 January 1961) is the former first vice president of Norwegian Olympic and Paralympic Committee and Confederation of Sports from 2015 to 2019. She was the president of the Norwegian Equestrian Federation from 2003 to 2012, and elected onto the International Olympic Committee in 2017. While with the IOC, Aasen was part of commissions for the 2026 Winter Olympics, 2026 Winter Paralympics and 2032 Summer Olympics.

== Early life and education ==
Kristin Kloster Aasen was born on 4 January 1961. In 1980, she finished programs in political studies and history at the University of Minnesota before going to the University of Oslo the same year. In Oslo, Aasen specialized in criminology and became a lawyer in 1990.

== Career ==
Aasen began her equestrian career in 1976. She opened a farm and became a horse breeder in 1989. She joined the Norwegian Equestrian Federation in 1997 and was subsequently promoted to vice president in 1999 and president in 2003. She remained in her position as president until 2012. During her time at the NEF, Aasen led the process of merging anti-doping policies from 2007 to 2008. Other equestrian positions include an administrative position at the International Federation for Equestrian Sports starting in 1996, and member of the Clean Sport commission for the FEI.

Outside of her career in equestrian, Aasen became the second vice president of the Norwegian Olympic and Paralympic Committee and Confederation of Sports in 2011 and moved to first vice president in 2015. She continued her vice president position until 2019. During the early 2010s, Aasen took part of the Oslo bid for the 2022 Winter Olympics. In 2017, she was elected to the International Olympic Committee. Aasen was selected by former member Gerhard Heiberg to replace him in the IOC after his resignation. As part of the IOC, Aasen was selected in 2018 as part of an Evaluation Commission for the 2026 Winter Olympics and 2026 Winter Paralympics. The following year, she became part of a Future Host Commission for the 2032 Summer Olympics.
