= 2032 Summer Olympics =

Multi-sport event in Brisbane, Australia

Games of the XXXV Olympiad
- Emblem of the 2032 Summer Olympics
- Location: Brisbane, Australia
- Opening: 23 July 2032
- Closing: 8 August 2032
- Stadium: Brisbane Stadium

The 2032 Summer Olympics, officially the Games of the XXXV Olympiad and also known as Brisbane 2032, is a planned international multi-sport event scheduled to take place from 23 July to 8 August 2032 in Brisbane, Australia, with venues across the various regions of Queensland.

As part of the new Olympic bid process, the Future Host Commission of the International Olympic Committee (IOC) nominated Brisbane as its preferred candidate on 24 February 2021. The Brisbane bid was approved on 21 July 2021 during the 138th IOC Session in Tokyo, Japan.

It will be the third Olympic Games held in Australia, following the 1956 Summer Olympics in Melbourne, Victoria, and the 2000 Summer Olympics in Sydney, New South Wales; Melbourne and Sydney will host some events during the Games. It will be held in Brisbane's winter, the second Summer Olympics held in the host city's winter after the 2016 Summer Olympics in Rio de Janeiro, Brazil. It will also be the first Olympic Games since 2016 to take place in the southern hemisphere.

== Bidding process ==
The new IOC bidding process was approved at the 134th IOC Session on 24 June 2019 in Lausanne, Switzerland. The key proposals, driven by the relevant recommendations from Olympic Agenda 2020, are:

- Establish a permanent, ongoing dialogue to explore and create interest among cities/regions/countries and National Olympic Committees for any Olympic event
- Create two Future Host Commissions (Summer and Winter Games) to oversee interest in future Olympic events and report to the IOC executive board
- Give the IOC Session more influence by having non-executive board members form part of the Future Host Commissions.

The IOC also modified the Olympic Charter to increase its flexibility by removing the date of election from 7 years before the games and changing the host from a single city/region/country to multiple cities, regions, or countries.

The change in the bidding process was criticised by members of the German bid as "incomprehensible" and hard to surpass in "terms of non-transparency".

According to Future Host Commission terms of reference with rules of conduct, the new IOC bidding system is divided into two dialogue stages:

- Continuous Dialogue: Non-committal discussions between the IOC and Interested Parties (City/Region/Country/NOC interested in hosting) concerning hosting future Olympic events.
- Targeted Dialogue: Targeted discussions with one or more Interested Parties (called Preferred Host(s)), as instructed by the IOC Executive Board. This follows a recommendation by the Future Host Commission as a result of Continuous Dialogue.

=== Host selection ===
On 24 February 2021, the Future Host Commission named Brisbane as its preferred candidate for the 2032 Summer Olympics, and the IOC formally invited the Brisbane bid committee and Australian Olympic Committee to engage in targeted dialogue. Committee chairwoman Kristin Kloster Aasen cited Brisbane's "high level of expertise in hosting major international sports events", the quality of its transport infrastructure (citing its performance during the 2018 Commonwealth Games), and a favourable climate.

2032 Summer Olympics host city election
City	Nation	Votes
Brisbane	Australia	Unanimous

At the 138th IOC Session in Tokyo, Japan on 21 July 2021, the IOC's delegates passed a referendum to officially award the 2032 Summer Olympics to Brisbane. In the voting, 72 of the delegates voted "Yes", 5 voted "No" and 3 other voters abstained. Having been awarded the hosting rights 11 years and 2 days in advance, this is the most time a host city has had in planning and organizing an Olympic Games.

== Organisation ==
The Brisbane Organising Committee for the 2032 Olympic and Paralympic Games, a statutory corporation, was established by the Queensland Government in 2021. It is governed by a board led by Andrew Liveris AO; its role is to plan, organise and deliver the Brisbane Olympic and Paralympic Games in accordance with the 'host contract' struck between Brisbane organisers and the IOC in 2021.

== Development and preparations ==
From the 2021 selection of the city as the host for the 2032 Summer Olympics, Brisbane has 11 years to prepare for the games. A feasibility study commissioned by the Southeast Queensland Council of Mayors in 2019 suggested that the Games could be a catalyst for increased transport and infrastructure investment. Additionally, 68% of the required venues were judged to already exist or could be upgraded to an Olympic standard. It concluded that, excluding government agency costs and contributions by the IOC and the private sector, the Games net cost would be $900 million. This amount also did not include the suggested billions of dollars of greater investment in roads and public transport that would be required for the Games to be successful.

In 2023, the federal and state governments reached a funding deal, with the Commonwealth contributing $2.5 billion for the Brisbane Live arena and $1 billion for other infrastructure. The remaining costs would be borne by the Queensland Government.

=== Venues ===
The Games will use a mix of new, renovated, and expanded venues across Brisbane, Gold Coast, and the Sunshine Coast, Cairns, Toowoomba and Townsville, Queensland. Melbourne and Sydney—Australia's two previous host cities in 1956 and 2000, respectively—will also host football preliminaries.

A new 63,000-seat stadium will be built at Victoria Park, which will host the ceremonies and athletics events; it will replace Brisbane's historic Gabba stadium as the city's main facility for Australian rules football and cricket following the Games. The Centenary Pool Complex will be expanded with a new 25,000-seat aquatics centre, while the Queensland Tennis Centre will be expanded with 12 new courts and a 3,000-seat show court.

==== Venue construction and renovations ====
The Gabba was originally slated to be reconstructed to host the ceremonies and athletics, expanding it to 50,000 seats and adding a new pedestrian plaza. The costs of the Gabba project were scrutinized by politicians; it was originally announced at a cost of $1 billion, but by February 2023, it had increased to $2.7 billion, which would be paid entirely by the state. Scrutiny over the Gabba project grew after Victoria withdrew its hosting of the 2026 Commonwealth Games due to cost concerns. In December 2023, Lord Mayor Adrian Schrinner withdrew his support for the project, stating that Brisbane 2032 had "become more about overpriced stadiums rather than the promise of vital transport solutions", and that a parallel proposal to build a $137 million stadium on the Brisbane Showgrounds to house the Gabba's tenants during construction was the "final straw".

On 13 December 2023, Premier of Queensland Steven Miles announced the establishment of a Brisbane 2032 infrastructure authority, and an independent review of the Games' venue plans. On 18 March 2024, Miles announced that the Gabba reconstruction had been scrapped as a result, and that Lang Park (which is already scheduled to host rugby sevens and football) and Queensland Sport and Athletics Centre (QSAC) would respectively host the ceremonies and athletics instead. Both venues would be refurbished, while reports that had been commissioned as part of the Gabba project would be used to guide future work on the stadium. A proposed 17,000-seat indoor arena known as Brisbane Live (which was slated to host swimming and water polo events) was also relocated to the Roma Street Parkland, rather than above the Roma Street railway station. The review recommended the construction of a new 55,000-seat stadium at Victoria Park, but Miles stated he wanted Brisbane 2032 to be a "low-cost" Games, and that he could not justify a $3.4 billion stadium "when Queenslanders are struggling with housing and other costs".

On 29 October 2024, after the Liberal National Party of Queensland's victory in the state election, incoming Premier David Crisafulli announced that he would launch a 100-day independent review of the stadium proposals. This included the Gabba rebuild and Victoria Park stadium proposals, as well as new proposals sent in by numerous design firms. The plan to have athletics at QSAC was scrapped. Crisafulli stated that he wanted the review to result in "something that Queenslanders are proud of." In January 2025, former Premier Annastacia Palaszczuk told ABC News that the review committee had internally decided to move forward with the Victoria Park stadium as a public-private partnership; she argued that this was "absolutely a ridiculous idea", and that "it's going to cost a lot more — more billions and billions of dollars that Queenslanders don't have at the moment because of the cost-of-living pressures".

On 25 March 2025, Crisafulli announced that the state government would go ahead with plans for a 63,000-seat stadium at Victoria Park; the stadium will replace the Gabba, which will be demolished and redeveloped for a residential project following the Games. He argued that "any other choice would have meant placing the government's interests ahead of the interests of Queensland" and felt that hosting athletics at QSAC would have been "embarrassing". Crisafulli apologized for breaking a campaign promise to not build a new stadium for the Olympics, stating that "I have to own that, and I will. I am sorry, it's my decision, and I accept that decision". According to the review, the stadium will cost an estimated AU$3.8 billion, although this figure is yet to be publicly confirmed. Brisbane Live was also scrapped in favour of building a new 25,000-seat aquatics centre at the Centenary Pool Complex; after the Games, the capacity would be reduced to 8,000. The arena will be relocated to Woolloongabba across from the Gabba, and will continue as a standalone "market-led" project without federal funding.

=== Infrastructure ===
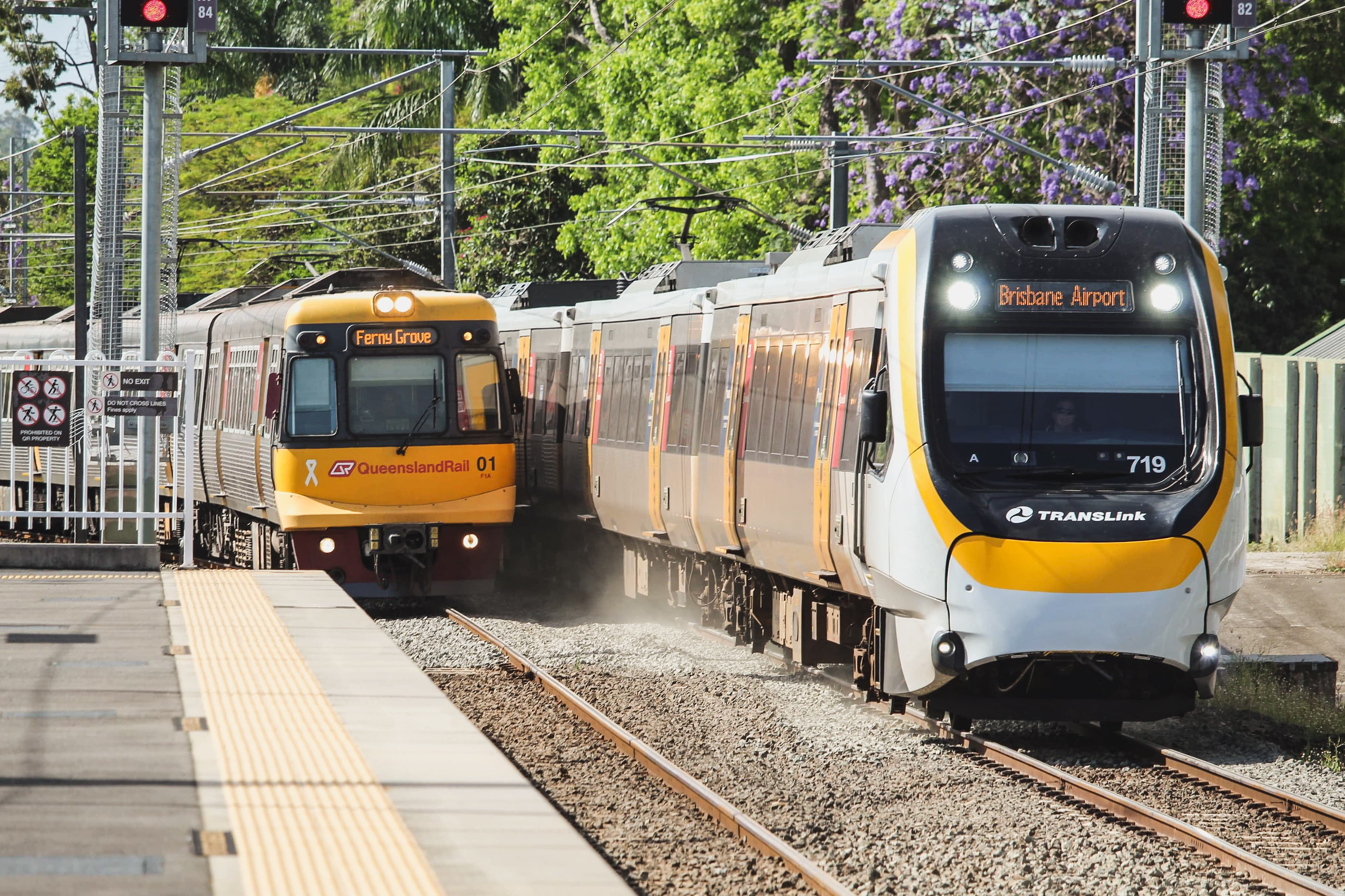
Trains on the Queensland Rail city network in 2018

As of 2021, Brisbane has many infrastructure projects under construction or planning on top of the Games. Cross River Rail, scheduled to be completed by 2029, is an underground railway project through central Brisbane, which is under construction. Cross River Rail will see the development of a new rail line underneath Brisbane River, and the redevelopment of several stations in the Brisbane central business district with a cost of over A$17 billion. Another transport infrastructure project is the Brisbane Metro bus rapid transit project, which consists of two routes with a headway of up to five minutes during peak times. The project is scheduled to be completed in late 2024. In May 2024, funding was announced for the proposed Maroochydore railway line, expected to be completed by 2032.

Brisbane Lord Mayor Adrian Schrinner proposed in 2021 that a 7-hectare (17-acre) glass factory in West End formerly operated by Visy, be redeveloped into a 57,000 m^{2} (613,500 sq ft) International Broadcast Centre along the banks of the Brisbane River.

The main Athletes' Village will be located at Bowen Hills, with satellite villages in Royal Pines, Maroochydore, Rockhampton and Hervey Bay.

In December 2025, the Queensland government appointed Unite32, a joint venture between Aecom and Laing O'Rourke, to be the delivery partner for the Games' infrastructure.

== The Games ==
=== Sports ===
Since 2020, the program of the Summer Olympics has consisted of mandatory core sports that persist between Games, and up to six optional sports proposed by the organizing committee in order to improve local interest. The initial sports programme will be determined during the 147th IOC Session in April 2027.

==== Proposed sports and events ====
Various international sports federations and similar sanctioning bodies have announced plans to pursue bids for the addition of sports (optional or non-mandatory core sports) to the 2032 Games:

- In February 2021, Softball Australia, Baseball Australia and the World Baseball Softball Confederation announced their intent to pursue baseball and softball for the Brisbane 2032 programs. CEO of Baseball Australia Glenn Williams noted record broadcasting audiences for baseball and softball at the 2020 Summer Olympics, with Softball Australia chair Richard Lindell also supporting the sports' reinstatement into the core Olympic program. Both disciplines have medalled for Australia at the Olympics. Baseball and softball was selected by the Los Angeles 2028 organising committee for inclusion in its program. In August 2025, the mayor of Logan City, Jon Raven, announced that his city's council were considering building a ballpark in the area if baseball and softball were chosen as sports. In September, he announced that the ballpark would be built within Griffith University's Logan campus.
- In July 2021, International Rugby League (IRL) chair Troy Grant stated that the organisation planned to pursue rugby league nines and wheelchair rugby league for the 2032 Olympics and Paralympics respectively.
- In August 2021, the International Cricket Council (ICC) announced the establishment of a working group to pursue cricket for the Los Angeles 2028 and Brisbane 2032 Summer Olympics, including representatives from the Asian Cricket Council (ACC), England and Wales Cricket Board (ECB), USA Cricket, and Zimbabwe Cricket. The bid has also received backing from the Board of Control for Cricket in India (BCCI). Cricket is one of the most popular sports in Australia, and Cricket Australia is one of the 12 full members of the ICC. Cricket was selected by the Los Angeles 2028 organising committee for inclusion in its program, and the ICC has continued to push for the sport to be retained for 2032.
- In August 2021, World Netball announced that it would pursue the inclusion of netball, with backing from Netball Australia. The country has won the Netball World Cup eleven times since its inception. The bid faced a potential obstacle from the IOC's current policy of gender parity, as men's netball was not at parity with women's netball in terms of participation and prominence at the time. In August 2025, Netball Australia chair Liz Ellis made a renewed pitch for netball's inclusion, and highlighted that men's netball participation had been growing. In March 2026, a survey released by World Netball stated that 66% out of more than 3,000 Australians wanted to see netball added to the 2032 Olympics.
- In October 2023, the World Squash Federation announced its intent to pursue squash for the 2032 Olympics. Squash was selected by the Los Angeles 2028 organising committee for inclusion in its program.
- In December 2023, the International Federation of American Football (IFAF) announced that it would pursue flag football for Brisbane 2032. Flag football was selected by the Los Angeles 2028 organising committee for inclusion in its program. In June 2025, the American National Football League's Australia and New Zealand department general manager Charlotte Offord said that the inclusion of flag football for 2028 "was a really big moment for the sport and really uplifted the uptake, and we are very ambitious in our quest to try and get flag football into Brisbane 2032", given the increasing popularity of the sport in Australia.
- In January 2024, the World DanceSport Federation approved a strategic plan for 2024–2032, which aimed to have breakdancing (which debuted as an optional sport in 2024) admitted as a core Olympic sport.
- In April 2024, a delegation from the World Flying Disc Federation met with the organising committee to campaign for a flying disc sport to be included in Brisbane 2032.
- In April 2024, the Trail Running Association of Queensland (TRAQ) initiated a ten-year plan to pursue trail running for Brisbane 2032. Around the same time, a campaign by Merrell was launched with a 455 kilometres (283 mi) relay from 2012 host, London, to 2024 host, Paris.
- In April 2024, the International Life Saving Federation (ILS) and Surf Life Saving Australia announced their intent to pursue beach lifesaving sports for Brisbane 2032, with a focus on oceanman/woman and mixed relay events. A number of Australian Olympians have had a background in competitive surf lifesaving, including Grant Hackett and Ky Hurst.
- In May 2024, the Federation of International Touch announced its intent to pursue touch football for Brisbane 2032 as a mixed gender event.
- In February 2025, the World Karate Federation (WKF) held a meeting with the Brisbane 2032 Organising Committee to discuss the inclusion of karate. Karate made its debut as an optional sport in 2020.
- In May 2025, Jason Ferguson, the chairman of the World Professional Billiards and Snooker Association, said that after Chinese snooker player Zhao Xintong won the 2025 World Snooker Championship, he believes the result can open more doors globally to the sport, and Zhao's becoming the first snooker world champion from China could increase snooker's chances of becoming an Olympic sport.
- In July 2025, World Bowls and Bowls Australia jointly launched a campaign for the inclusion of lawn bowls in both the 2032 Olympics and Paralympics.
- In December 2025, during an interview with City AM, World Triathlon president Antonio Arimany that he would pursue the inclusion of T100 Triathlon. A T100 triathlon typically consists of a 2 km swim, an 80 km bike ride, and an 18 km run, for a total distance of 100 km; respectively 0.5 km, 40 km and 8 km longer than the standard Olympic format.
- In March 2026, before the start of the 2026 AFL season, the CEO of the Australian Football League, Andrew Dillon, hinted he had spoken "at a high level" with organising committee president Andrew Liveris on having Australian rules football becoming an Olympic sport.
- In April 2026, the International Floorball Federation announced they had entered into dialogue with the Brisbane 2032 organising committee to have the sport of floorball included as an optional sport. The federation proposed a 3v3 format to better align with the urban sports currently part of the Summer Olympics.
- In July 2026, ABC News reported that during meetings and a gift register between sports federations and the Brisbane 2032 organising committee throughout 2026, members of the International Mixed Martial Arts Federation attempted to send gifts to the organising committee as a potential influence on including mixed martial arts. Examples include two bottles of wine worth AU$20,000 in February, and a AU$82,270 Louis XIII Rare Cask 42.1 cognac and a AU$2,600 Louis XIII Grande Champagne cognac in a Baccarat crystal decanter in March. The organising committee chose to not accept these gifts, considering them exorbitant.
- In October 2026, Hyrox and Xenom announced they would seek inclusion of a fitness-racing competition like Hyrox in the 2032 Olympics as part of its expansion plan. On 28 October, World Triathlon would form a partnership with Hyrox to work towards Olympic inclusion.
- In October 2026, the International Padel Federation announced an ambition to include padel in the 2032 Olympics, citing its growing popularity and inclusion in other multi-sport events, such as the Asian Games and European Games. Several padel players around the world have announced support for its inclusion.
- In October 2026, World Sailing's Events and Equipment Committee announced they were considering introducing wing foiling and a mixed team tournament to the 2032 Olympics.

In November 2026, News Corp Australia reported that the organising committee was considering selecting cricket, lawn bowls, netball, rugby league, and surf lifesaving as their optional sports.

== Marketing ==
=== Emblem ===
The emblem for the 2032 Summer Olympics and Paralympics was officially unveiled on 5 October 2026 in Riverside Green, South Bank. It was gradually revealed starting from 29 September with six "puzzle pieces" across the state of Queensland providing clues to the final design, culminating in the grand reveal ceremony in Brisbane. However, on 2 October, the final emblem design was accidentally leaked through a thumbnail on a video set to premiere on 5 October on the Brisbane 2032 official YouTube channel. In the description of the video, the design was described as "inspired by the spirited cockatoo – a symbol of Australia’s unique wildlife and playful heart" and that "the cockatoo’s crest is a living torch, reminiscent of the iconic Olympic and Paralympic flame. Shaped like Queensland, with its eye on Brisbane, the Emblem is a universal symbol to unite Brisbane, Australia and the world in 2032."

The last day of the reveal week was ultimately cancelled due to the leak, with the final two sections of the emblem being revealed on the Gold Coast instead. The full emblem was revealed online on 3 October 2026, two days earlier than planned. This was the first time that an emblem for the Olympic Games was revealed in stages rather than as a whole, as well as the first to be leaked prior to its official unveiling. The emblems are designed by four agencies VML, Verian Group|, Landor and BlackCard under "TeamFuture32", with custom typography by Foster Type.

=== Corporate sponsorship ===
Sponsors of the 2032 Summer Olympics
Worldwide Olympic Partners
- AB InBev
- Allianz
- Coca-Cola-Mengniu Dairy
- Deloitte
- Omega SA
- TCL Technology
- Visa Inc.
Premium Partners
- Commonwealth Bank

== Broadcasting rights ==
Domestically, the Games will be televised by Nine Entertainment properties (including the Nine Network), which acquired the rights to the Olympics from 2024 through 2032 in a deal announced on 8 February 2023. These Games also mark the final year of the IOC's long-term broadcasting contracts with CMG in China, European Broadcasting Union/Skydance Global Sports Group (formerly Warner Bros. Discovery) in Europe, and NBCUniversal in the United States, among others. In March 2025, NBCU signed an extension to air the Olympics through the 2036 Games; the IOC is otherwise waiting "for the best market conditions" to sign new broadcasting deals.

Territory	Rights holder	Ref
Albania	RTSH	
Australia	Nine	
Austria	ORF	
Belgium	RTBF, VRT	
Brazil	Grupo Globo	
Bulgaria	BNT	
Canada	CBC/Radio Canada	
Central Asia and Southeast Asia	Infront Sports & Media	
China	CMG	
Croatia	HRT	
Czech Republic	ČT	
Denmark	DR, TV 2	
Estonia	ERR	
Europe	EBU, Skydance Global Sports Group	
Finland	Yle	
France	France Télévisions	
Germany	ARD, ZDF	
Greece	ERT	
Hungary	MTVA	
Iceland	RÚV	
Ireland	RTÉ	
Israel	Sports Channel	
Italy	RAI	
Japan	Japan Consortium	
Kosovo	RTK	
Latin America (Note: Except Brazil)	Claro Sports	
Latvia	LTV	
Lithuania	LRT	
Mexico	TelevisaUnivision	
Montenegro	RTCG	
Netherlands	NOS	
New Zealand	Sky	
Norway	NRK	
Poland	TVP	
Portugal	RTP	
Slovakia	STVR	
Slovenia	RTV	
Spain	RTVE	
Sweden	SVT	
Switzerland	SRG SSR	
Ukraine	Suspilne	
United Kingdom	BBC	
United States	NBCUniversal	

== See also ==
- 2032 Summer Paralympics
- Olympic Games held in Australia
  - 1956 Summer Olympics – Melbourne
  - 2000 Summer Olympics – Sydney
  - 2032 Summer Olympics – Brisbane
- List of IOC country codes
- Major sport events in Brisbane and surrounding areas

Summer Olympics
Preceded by Los Angeles	Summer Olympic Games; Brisbane; XXXV Olympiad (2032)	Succeeded by To be determined
