= Figure skating at the 2010 Winter Olympics – Women's singles =

Women's singles at the XXI Olympic Winter Games
- Venue: Pacific Coliseum; Vancouver, Canada
- Dates: 23 and 25 February 2010
- Competitors: 30 from 23 nations
- Winning score: 228.56 points

Medalists
1st place, gold medalist(s)		Yuna Kim	South Korea
2nd place, silver medalist(s)		Mao Asada	Japan
3rd place, bronze medalist(s)		Joannie Rochette	Canada

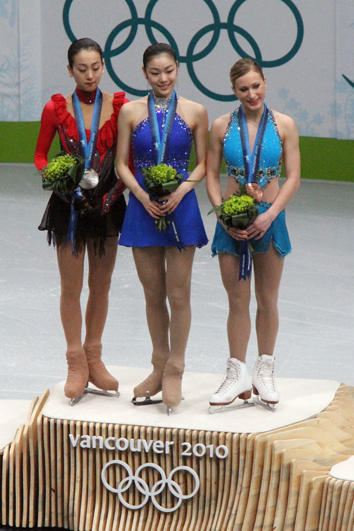
The medalists from the women's event at the 2010 Winter Olympics (from left to right): Mao Asada of Japan (silver), Yuna Kim of South Korea (gold), and Joannie Rochette of Canada (bronze)

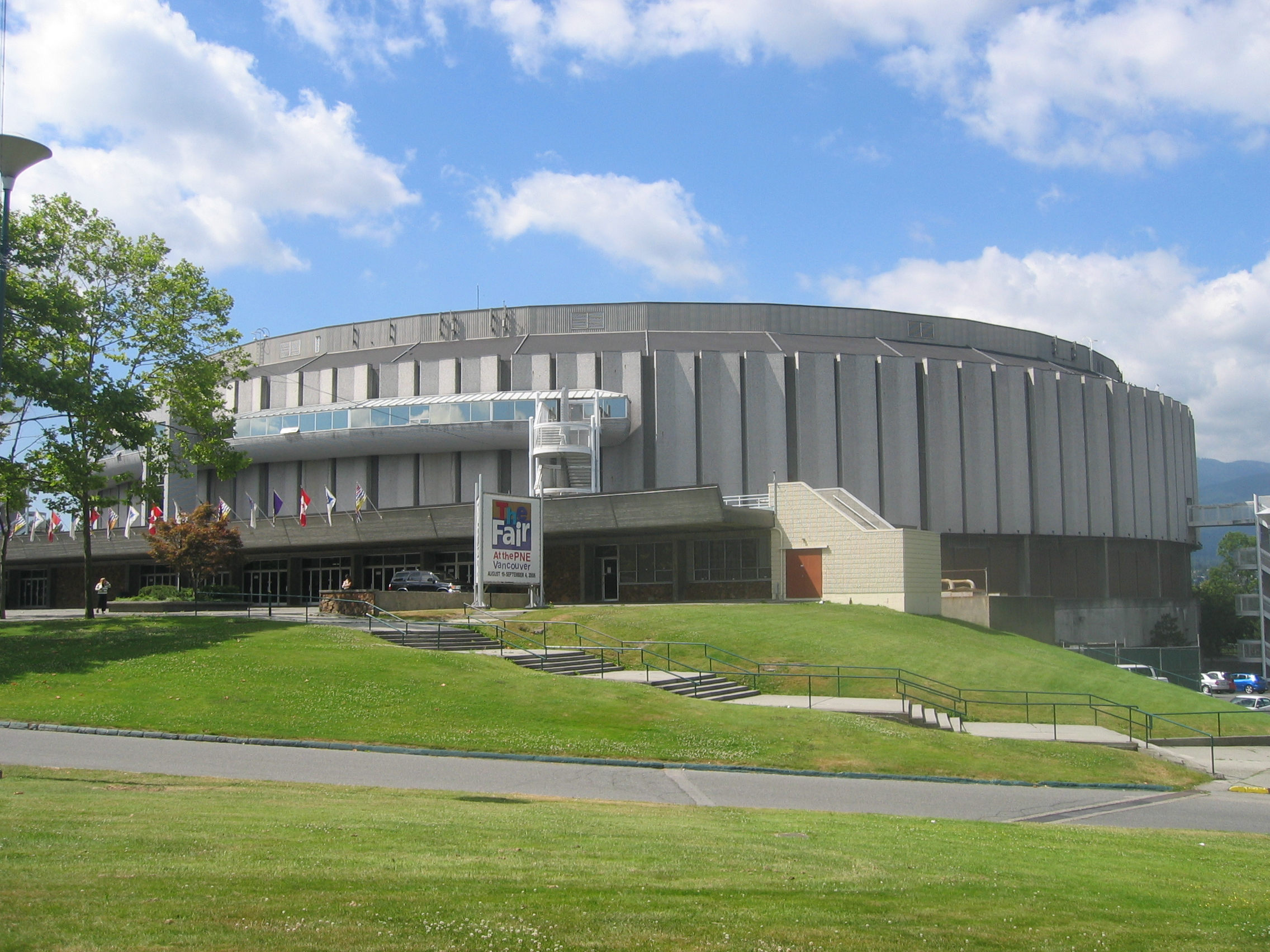
The figure skating events at the 2010 Winter Olympics were held at the Pacific Coliseum in Vancouver, Canada.

The women's singles figure skating competition at the 2010 Winter Olympics was held on 23 and 25 February at the Pacific Coliseum in Vancouver, Canada, and featured 30 skaters from 23 nations. Yuna Kim of South Korea won the gold medal, Mao Asada of Japan won the silver medal, and Joannie Rochette of Canada won the bronze. Kim set new world record scores in the short program, free skating, and overall total, winning the first ever Olympic medal for South Korea in figure skating. Asada became the first woman to successfully perform a triple Axel in the short program, as well as two in the free skate. Rochette's bronze medal was bittersweet, as her mother had died of a heart attack just four days prior.

== Background ==
The women's single skating event was one of four figure skating competitions contested at the 2010 Winter Olympics in Vancouver, British Columbia, in Canada. It was held at the Pacific Coliseum over two nights: the short program took place on 23 February and the free skating on 25 February. The competition featured 30 skaters representing 23 nations. Yuna Kim of South Korea and Mao Asada of Japan were widely seen as the most likely contenders for an Olympic gold medal. Both women – born within twenty days of each other – had been in constant competition with each other since 2005. Asada won the 2005 World Junior Figure Skating Championships, with Kim finishing second; while Kim won the 2006 World Junior Championships, with Asada finishing second. At the 2007 World Championships, Asada finished in second place, and Kim finished third. Kim finished first in the short program, setting a new world record score; Asada finished first in the free skate, also setting a new world record score. Asada won the 2008 World Championships; Kim won the 2009 Skating Championships. Kim became the first woman to break the 200-point threshold in the overall total score, setting a new world record in the process. She then broke that record at the 2009 Trophée Éric Bompard. Kim was the 2009 Four Continents champion, three-time Grand Prix of Figure Skating Final champion, and six-time South Korean national champion. Asada was a two-time Four Continents champion, the 2008 Grand Prix Final champion, and a four-time Japanese national champion.

Therese Rochette, mother of Joannie Rochette, died on 21 February shortly after arriving in Vancouver. Joannie Rochette's father traveled to the Olympic Village to deliver the news to her in person. Rochette was the reigning world silver medalist, and a six-time Canadian national champion. Officials from Skate Canada announced that she would continue to compete, but would not speak to the media until after the competition was over.

== Qualification ==
There is no individual athlete qualification to the Olympics; the choice of whom to send is at the discretion of each country's National Olympic Committee (NOC). Twenty-four quota spots in the women's event were awarded based on the results at the 2009 World Figure Skating Championships. Georgia had originally qualified two quota spots, but relinquished one of them. That extra quota spot was made available at the 2009 Nebelhorn Trophy along with the other six spots originally allocated.

Israel qualified one quota spot after Tamar Katz finished in twelfth place at the 2009 Nebelhorn Trophy. However, the Olympic Committee of Israel declined to send Katz to the Winter Olympics, as she did not meet their prescribed standards. Their quota spot was re-allocated to Australia; the Australian Olympic Committee chose to send Cheltzie Lee. Switzerland originally qualified two quota spots in the women's event, but the Swiss Olympic Association only sent one woman: Sarah Meier. Instead, the National Olympic Committee of the Republic of Uzbekistan elected to send Anastasia Gimazetdinova.

Qualifying nations in women's singles
Event	Skaters per NOC	Qualifying NOCs	Total skaters
2009 World Championships	3	Japan	22
2009 World Championships	2	Canada; Finland; ~~Georgia~~; South Korea; Russia; ~~Switzerland~~; United States	22
2009 World Championships	1	Estonia; Georgia; Germany; Great Britain; Italy; Poland; Slovakia; Switzerland; Turkey	22
2009 Nebelhorn Trophy	1	Australia; Austria; Belgium; China; Hungary; ~~Israel~~; Slovenia; Spain; Uzbekistan	8
Total			30

== Required performance elements ==
Women performed their short programs on 23 February. Lasting no more than 2 minutes 50 seconds, the short program had to include the following elements: one double Axel; one triple jump immediately preceded by connecting steps; one jump combination consisting of a double jump and a triple jump, or two triple jumps; one flying spin; one layback spin or sideways leaning spin; one spin combination consisting of sit, upright, and camel positions and a change of foot; a spiral sequence; and a step sequence.

The twenty-four highest scoring skaters after the short program advanced to the free skating, which they performed on 25 February. Lasting 4 minutes 30 seconds (+/− 10 seconds), the free skate had to include the following elements: seven jump elements, of which one had to be an Axel-type jump; three spins, of which one had to be a spin combination, one a flying spin, and one a spin with only one position; a step sequence; and a spiral sequence.

== Judging ==
Skaters were judged according to the required technical elements of their program (such as jumps and spins), as well as the overall presentation of their program, based on five program components (skating skills, transitions/linking footwork and movement, performance/execution, choreography/composition, and musical interpretation). Each technical element in a figure skating performance was assigned a predetermined base point value and scored by a panel of nine judges on a scale from −3 to +3 based on the quality of its execution. Each Grade of Execution (GOE) from –3 to +3 was assigned a value as indicated on the Scale of Values. For example, a triple Axel was worth a base value of 8.20 points, and a GOE of +3 was worth 3.00 points, so a triple Axel with a GOE of +3 earned 11.20 points. The judging panel's GOE for each element was determined by calculating the trimmed mean (the average after discarding the highest and lowest scores). The panel's scores for all elements were added together to generate a Total Elements Score. At the same time, the judges evaluated each performance based on the five aforementioned program components and assigned each a score from 0.25 to 10 in 0.25-point increments. The judging panel's final score for each program component was also determined by calculating the trimmed mean. Those scores were then multiplied by the factor shown on the chart below; the results were added together to generate a total Program Component Score.

Program component factoring
Discipline	Short program	Free skate
Women	0.80	1.60

Deductions were applied for certain violations, such as time infractions, stops and restarts, or falls. The Total Elements Score and Program Component Score were then added together, minus any deductions, to generate a final performance score for each skater or team.

== Results ==
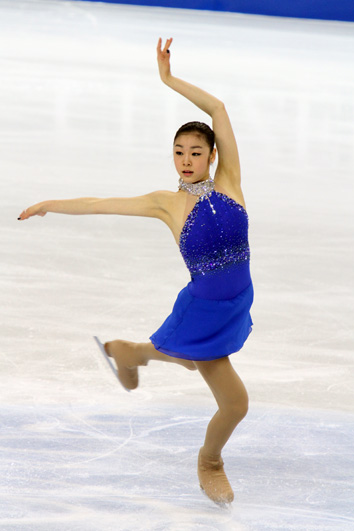
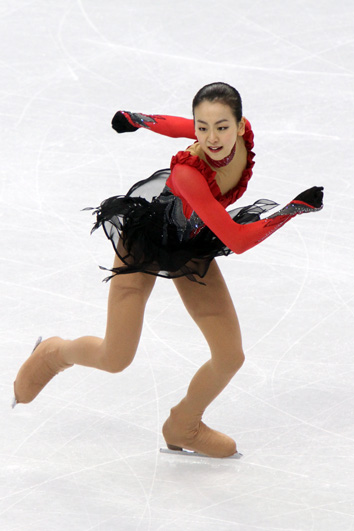
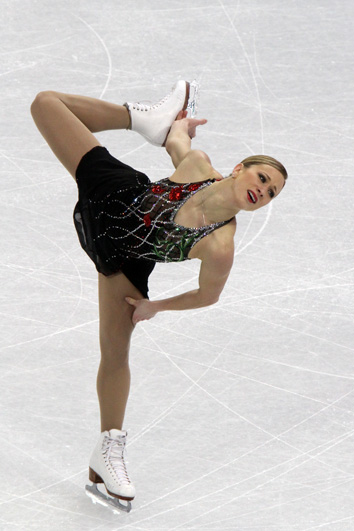
The gold, silver, and bronze medalists from the women's event at the 2010 Winter Olympics (from left to right):
Yuna Kim of South Korea (gold), Mao Asada of Japan (silver), and Joannie Rochette of Canada (bronze)

Code key

- TSS – Total Segment Score
- TES – Total Elements Score
- PCS – Program Component Score
- SS – Skating skills
- TR – Transitions
- PE – Performance
- CH – Choreography
- IN – Musical interpretation
- DED – Deductions

=== Short program ===
The women's short program was held on 23 February. Yuna Kim of South Korea finished in first place, setting a new world record score of 78.50 in the short program. The previous world record had been set by Kim at the 2009 Skate America. Kim's performance – set to a medley of James Bond music – featured a triple Lutz-triple toe loop jump combination, a triple flip, and a double Axel. Mao Asada of Japan finished in second place; her performance – set to Masquerade by Aram Khachaturian – featured a solid triple Axel-double toe loop jump combination. Her score of 73.78 beat her previous season-best score by almost 15 points. Asada became the first woman to successfully perform a triple Axel in the short program and the first to perform one in combination. Joannie Rochette of Canada, competing less than three days after the death of her mother, finished in third place. Rochette held her composure until after she was finished performing, at which point she began to cry. Miki Ando of Japan followed her in fourth place, while Rachael Flatt of the United States finished in fifth.

A number of retired figure skaters, including Michelle Kwan and Scott Hamilton, believed that little could prevent Kim from winning the gold medal. Kwan said that Kim was "what the judges are looking for, when it came to jump quality, spin quality and edges." Hamilton described Kim as "a champion who found a way of breaking others' will". He stated that Kim had a technical mastery of all of the required elements with no weaknesses, she skated with greater speed than her competitors, and her jumps had excellent technique.

Women's short program results
Pl.	Skater	Nation	TSS	TES	PCS	SS	TR	PE	CH	IN	DED
1	Yuna Kim	South Korea	78.50	44.70	33.80	8.60	7.90	8.60	8.40	8.75	0.00
2	Mao Asada	Japan	73.78	41.50	32.28	8.25	7.40	8.40	8.10	8.20	0.00
3	Joannie Rochette	Canada	71.36	39.20	32.16	8.10	7.70	8.15	7.95	8.30	0.00
4	Miki Ando	Japan	64.76	34.80	29.96	7.70	7.00	7.60	7.50	7.65	0.00
5	Rachael Flatt	United States	64.64	36.80	27.84	7.00	6.60	7.05	6.95	7.20	0.00
6	Mirai Nagasu	United States	63.76	37.00	26.76	6.85	6.40	6.75	6.70	6.75	0.00
7	Carolina Kostner	Italy	63.02	33.34	29.68	7.70	7.15	7.35	7.50	7.40	0.00
8	Alena Leonova	Russia	62.14	33.90	28.24	7.15	6.70	7.25	7.00	7.20	0.00
9	Elene Gedevanishvili	Georgia	61.92	35.80	26.12	6.60	6.05	6.75	6.55	6.70	0.00
10	Laura Lepistö	Finland	61.36	32.88	28.48	7.20	6.80	7.25	7.15	7.20	0.00
11	Akiko Suzuki	Japan	61.02	33.10	27.92	7.25	6.70	7.05	6.95	6.95	0.00
12	Ksenia Makarova	Russia	59.22	35.46	23.76	6.20	5.55	6.10	5.85	6.00	0.00
13	Júlia Sebestyén	Hungary	57.46	30.70	26.76	6.90	6.30	6.80	6.70	6.75	0.00
14	Cynthia Phaneuf	Canada	57.16	31.80	26.36	6.75	6.25	6.65	6.50	6.80	1.00
15	Sarah Meier	Switzerland	56.70	30.70	26.00	6.60	6.10	6.65	6.45	6.70	0.00
16	Kwak Min-jeong	South Korea	53.16	31.40	21.76	5.65	5.05	5.65	5.40	5.45	0.00
17	Kiira Korpi	Finland	52.96	27.72	26.24	6.75	6.30	6.50	6.60	6.65	1.00
18	Cheltzie Lee	Australia	52.16	30.72	21.44	5.45	5.00	5.65	5.40	5.30	0.00
19	Liu Yan	China	51.74	29.94	21.80	5.65	5.10	5.45	5.45	5.60	0.00
20	Jelena Glebova	Estonia	50.80	27.20	23.60	6.05	5.60	5.90	5.85	6.10	0.00
21	Tuğba Karademir	Turkey	50.74	28.74	22.00	5.60	5.20	5.50	5.50	5.70	0.00
22	Sonia Lafuente	Spain	49.74	28.94	20.80	5.40	4.90	5.25	5.25	5.20	0.00
23	Sarah Hecken	Germany	49.04	27.04	22.00	5.80	5.25	5.55	5.45	5.45	0.00
24	Anastasia Gimazetdinova	Uzbekistan	49.02	27.94	21.08	5.50	4.95	5.40	5.20	5.30	0.00
25	Isabelle Pieman	Belgium	46.10	26.26	19.84	5.10	4.60	5.15	4.90	5.05	0.00
26	Miriam Ziegler	Austria	43.84	24.80	20.04	5.25	4.75	4.90	5.15	5.00	1.00
27	Teodora Poštič	Slovenia	43.80	23.80	20.00	5.10	4.65	5.15	5.00	5.10	0.00
28	Ivana Reitmayerová	Slovakia	41.94	22.66	19.28	5.00	4.60	4.85	4.90	4.75	0.00
29	Jenna McCorkell	Great Britain	40.64	20.08	21.56	5.60	5.15	5.25	5.50	5.45	1.00
30	Anna Jurkiewicz	Poland	36.10	16.78	19.32	5.05	4.65	4.75	4.85	4.85	0.00

=== Free skating ===
The women's free skate was held on 25 February. Yuna Kim finished in first place and won the gold medal, setting new world record scores for both the free skate and overall total. It was the first time since 1964 that neither an American nor a Russian won an Olympic medal in the women's individual event. Kim's free skate score of 150.06 beat the previous record, which had been set by her at the 2009 Trophée Éric Bompard, by over 16 points. Kim became the first skater from South Korea to win an Olympic medal in figure skating and the first athlete from South Korea to win any medal at the Winter Olympics outside of speed skating. Kim's performance, set to Concerto in F by George Gershwin, was described by Juliet Macur of The New York Times as if she "appeared to be floating", while "seamlessly incorporating triple jumps into her complex routine". She was rewarded with a standing ovation from the audience. Mao Asada won the silver medal with a overall total score of 205.50. During her performance to Prelude in C-sharp minor ("Bells of Moscow") by Sergei Rachmaninoff, Asada nicked the ice with her toepick and landed her planned triple toe loop as a single. Although her performance featured two triple Axels, it was not enough to surpass Kim. Asada became the first woman to successfully perform two triple Axels in the same routine.

Joannie Rochette, who had finished in fifth place at the 2006 Winter Olympics, finished in third place and won the bronze medal. Rochette's mother had died five days earlier, having suffered a massive heart attack after traveling from Montreal to Vancouver. "I [realize] how much people were inspired by this," Rochette said in an interview after the competition was over, "but I did this first of all for myself, because my mother taught me to think of myself first... My mother always wanted me to be a strong person." Skating to music from Samson and Delilah by Camille Saint-Saëns, Rochette had problems with some of her jumps, including one of her planned double Axels. Rochette outscored fourth-place Mirai Nagasu of the United States by nearly 12 points.

Women's free skate results
Pl.	Skater	Nation	TSS	TES	PCS	SS	TR	PE	CH	IN	DED
1	Yuna Kim	South Korea	150.06	78.30	71.76	9.05	8.60	9.15	8.95	9.10	0.00
2	Mao Asada	Japan	131.72	64.68	67.04	8.55	7.85	8.50	8.45	8.55	0.00
3	Joannie Rochette	Canada	131.28	62.80	68.48	8.60	8.30	8.55	8.65	8.70	0.00
4	Laura Lepistö	Finland	126.61	63.89	62.72	7.95	7.50	7.80	7.95	8.00	0.00
5	Mirai Nagasu	United States	126.39	65.83	60.56	7.75	7.25	7.70	7.55	7.60	0.00
6	Miki Ando	Japan	124.10	62.50	61.60	7.95	7.25	7.75	7.70	7.85	0.00
7	Akiko Suzuki	Japan	120.42	60.98	59.44	7.40	7.05	7.55	7.50	7.65	0.00
8	Rachael Flatt	United States	117.85	59.37	58.48	7.40	6.95	7.45	7.35	7.40	0.00
9	Ksenia Makarova	Russia	112.69	58.77	53.92	6.95	6.40	6.85	6.80	6.70	0.00
10	Alena Leonova	Russia	110.32	55.84	54.48	7.05	6.60	6.80	6.75	6.85	0.00
11	Kiira Korpi	Finland	108.61	54.93	53.68	6.85	6.45	6.75	6.70	6.80	0.00
12	Kwak Min-jeong	South Korea	102.37	53.57	48.80	6.25	5.80	6.15	6.15	6.15	0.00
13	Cynthia Phaneuf	Canada	99.46	48.94	51.52	6.65	6.00	6.55	6.45	6.55	1.00
14	Sarah Meier	Switzerland	96.11	43.87	52.24	6.60	6.30	6.50	6.55	6.70	0.00
15	Sarah Hecken	Germany	94.90	50.98	43.92	5.75	5.30	5.45	5.50	5.45	0.00
16	Júlia Sebestyén	Hungary	93.80	41.32	52.48	6.90	6.30	6.60	6.55	6.45	0.00
17	Elene Gedevanishvili	Georgia	93.32	40.64	53.68	6.95	6.50	6.60	6.75	6.75	1.00
18	Liu Yan	China	91.73	49.33	42.40	5.50	5.00	5.30	5.45	5.25	0.00
19	Carolina Kostner	Italy	88.88	34.84	57.04	7.55	6.95	6.70	7.30	7.15	3.00
20	Cheltzie Lee	Australia	86.00	42.44	44.56	5.85	5.30	5.60	5.65	5.45	1.00
21	Sonia Lafuente	Spain	83.77	43.97	40.80	5.25	4.75	5.15	5.20	5.15	1.00
22	Jelena Glebova	Estonia	83.39	39.11	45.28	5.85	5.55	5.50	5.65	5.75	1.00
23	Anastasia Gimazetdinova	Uzbekistan	82.63	41.47	42.16	5.55	5.05	5.15	5.30	5.30	1.00
24	Tuğba Karademir	Turkey	78.80	37.64	42.16	5.45	4.95	5.30	5.40	5.25	1.00

=== Overall ===
Women's results
Rank	Skater	Nation	Total	SP		FS	
1st place, gold medalist(s)	Yuna Kim	South Korea	228.56	1	78.50	1	150.06
2nd place, silver medalist(s)	Mao Asada	Japan	205.50	2	73.78	2	131.72
3rd place, bronze medalist(s)	Joannie Rochette	Canada	202.64	3	71.36	3	131.28
4	Mirai Nagasu	United States	190.15	6	63.76	5	126.39
5	Miki Ando	Japan	188.86	4	64.76	6	124.10
6	Laura Lepistö	Finland	187.97	10	61.36	4	126.61
7	Rachael Flatt	United States	182.49	5	64.64	8	117.85
8	Akiko Suzuki	Japan	181.44	11	61.02	7	120.42
9	Alena Leonova	Russia	172.46	8	62.14	10	110.32
10	Ksenia Makarova	Russia	171.91	12	59.22	9	112.69
11	Kiira Korpi	Finland	161.57	17	52.96	11	108.61
12	Cynthia Phaneuf	Canada	156.62	14	57.16	13	99.46
13	Kwak Min-jeong	South Korea	155.53	16	53.16	12	102.37
14	Elene Gedevanishvili	Georgia	155.24	9	61.92	17	93.32
15	Sarah Meier	Switzerland	152.81	15	56.70	14	96.11
16	Carolina Kostner	Italy	151.90	7	63.02	19	88.88
17	Júlia Sebestyén	Hungary	151.26	13	57.46	16	93.80
18	Sarah Hecken	Germany	143.94	23	49.04	15	94.90
19	Liu Yan	China	143.47	19	51.74	18	91.73
20	Cheltzie Lee	Australia	138.16	18	52.16	20	86.00
21	Jelena Glebova	Estonia	134.19	20	50.80	22	83.39
22	Sonia Lafuente	Spain	133.51	22	49.74	21	83.77
23	Anastasia Gimazetdinova	Uzbekistan	131.65	24	49.02	23	82.63
24	Tuğba Karademir	Turkey	129.54	21	50.74	24	78.80
25	Isabelle Pieman	Belgium	46.10	25	46.10	Did not advance to free skate	
26	Miriam Ziegler	Austria	43.84	26	43.84	Did not advance to free skate	
27	Teodora Poštič	Slovenia	43.80	27	43.80	Did not advance to free skate	
28	Ivana Reitmayerová	Slovakia	41.94	28	41.94	Did not advance to free skate	
29	Jenna McCorkell	Great Britain	40.64	29	40.64	Did not advance to free skate	
30	Anna Jurkiewicz	Poland	36.10	30	36.10	Did not advance to free skate	

== Records ==
The following new record high scores were set during this competition.

Record high scores
Date	Skater	Segment	Score	Ref.
23 February	(South Korea) Yuna Kim	Short program	78.50	
25 February	(South Korea) Yuna Kim	Free skating	150.06	
25 February	(South Korea) Yuna Kim	Total score	228.56	

== Works cited ==
- "Special Regulations & Technical Rules – Single & Pair Skating and Ice Dance 2008" (PDF). International Skating Union. Archived from the original (PDF) on 16 October 2021.
