= Yuna Kim =

South Korean figure skater (born 1990)

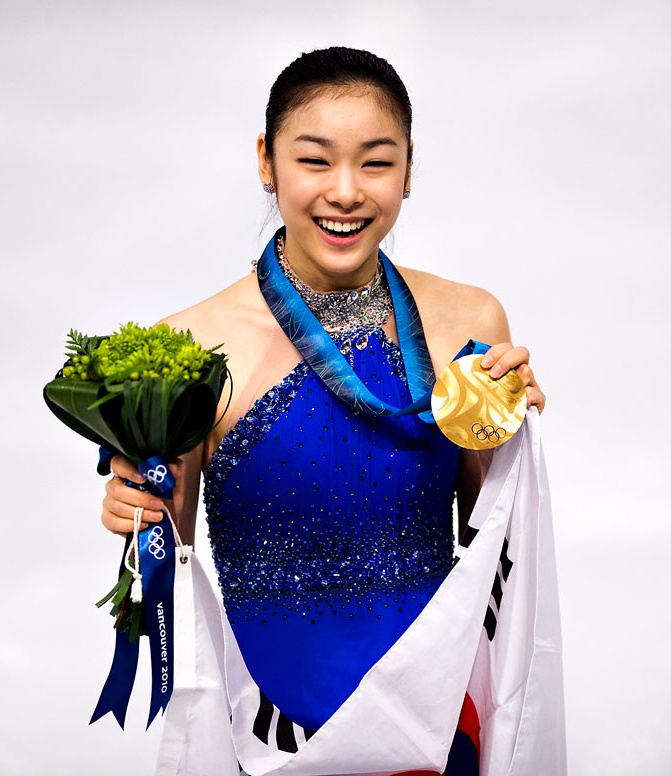
- Kim at the 2010 Winter Olympics

Personal information
- Other names: Kim Yeon-a, Kim Yuna
- Born: September 5, 1990 (age 36) Bucheon, South Korea
- Education: Korea University
- Occupations: Figure skater; Philanthropist
- Spouse: Ko Woo-rim (m. 2022)

Figure skating career
- Country: South Korea
- Discipline: Women's singles
- Began skating: 1996
- Competitive: 2001–2014
- Professional: 2014–present

Medal record
Event	Gold medal – first place	Silver medal – second place	Bronze medal – third place
Olympic Games	1	1	0
World Championships	2	2	2
Four Continents Championships	1	0	0
Grand Prix Final	3	1	0
South Korean Championships	6	0	0
World Junior Championships	1	1	0
Junior Grand Prix Final	1	1	0
Medal list
Olympic Games
Gold medal – first place	2010 Vancouver	Singles
Silver medal – second place	2014 Sochi	Singles
World Championships
Gold medal – first place	2009 Los Angeles	Singles
Gold medal – first place	2013 London	Singles
Silver medal – second place	2010 Turin	Singles
Silver medal – second place	2011 Moscow	Singles
Bronze medal – third place	2007 Tokyo	Singles
Bronze medal – third place	2008 Gothenburg	Singles
Four Continents Championships
Gold medal – first place	2009 Vancouver	Singles
Grand Prix Final
Gold medal – first place	2006–07 St. Petersburg	Singles
Gold medal – first place	2007–08 Turin	Singles
Gold medal – first place	2009–10 Tokyo	Singles
Silver medal – second place	2008–09 Goyang	Singles
South Korean Championships
Gold medal – first place	2003 Seoul	Singles
Gold medal – first place	2004 Seoul	Singles
Gold medal – first place	2005 Seoul	Singles
Gold medal – first place	2006 Seoul	Singles
Gold medal – first place	2013 Seoul	Singles
Gold medal – first place	2014 Goyang	Singles
World Junior Championships
Gold medal – first place	2006 Ljubljana	Singles
Silver medal – second place	2005 Kitchener	Singles
Junior Grand Prix Final
Gold medal – first place	2005–06 Ostrava	Singles
Silver medal – second place	2004–05 Helsinki	Singles

Korean name
- Hangul: 김연아
- Hanja: 金姸兒
- RR: Gim Yeona
- MR: Kim Yŏna

Yuna Kim (Korean: 김연아; born September 5, 1990), also credited in eastern name order as Kim Yuna or Kim Yeon-a, is a retired South Korean figure skater. Known for her well-rounded skills, achievements, popularity, and impact on the sport, she is one of the most highly recognized athletes in South Korea and regarded as one of the greatest figure skaters in history, being commonly referred to as "Queen Yuna". Kim started skating at five years old and competed in women's singles from 2001 to 2014. She is the 2010 Olympic champion, the 2014 Olympic silver medalist, a two-time World champion (2009, 2013) the 2009 Four Continents champion, a three-time Grand Prix Final champion (2006, 2007, 2009), the 2006 World Junior champion, the 2005 Junior Grand Prix Final champion, and a six-time South Korean national champion (2003–2006, 2013, 2014).

Kim never finished off the podium in her competitive career, becoming the first South Korean figure skater to medal at the Olympic Games, World Championships, ISU Grand Prix, and ISU Junior Grand Prix. She won every major international competition in the course of her career and is a former record holder in all three competition segments in women's singles under the ISU Judging System having broken world records 11 times. She was the first woman to score above 150 points in the free skating segment and 200 points in the combined total score. Kim is noted for her rivalry with three-time World champion Mao Asada from Japan, with whom she headlined women's skating for two Olympic cycles until the 2014 Winter Olympics in Sochi.

After her retirement from competitive figure skating in 2014, Kim was instrumental in the successful bid to bring the 2018 Winter Olympics to her home country in Pyeongchang. She also had a successful professional skating career, producing and appearing in several ice shows such as All That Skate. With her various sponsorships, Kim remained one of the highest-paid athletes in South Korea even well into her retirement. She was included in the Time magazine's annual list of the World's 100 Most Influential People in 2010 and in several Forbes lists.

== Early life ==
Kim was born on September 5, 1990, in Gyeonggi Province, South Korea, in the northern part of the country. A more standard transliteration of her name is "Yeon-a"; when Kim applied for a passport, the official misspelled her given name as "Yu-na" (유나) instead of "Yeon-a" (연아). Since her competitive days, she has asked international media to refer to her as "Yuna Kim" instead of "Kim Yu-na".

Kim was born to business owner Kim Hyeon-seok and his wife, Park Mi-hee. She has one older sister. Her mother, whom The Korea Times called "indisputably the No. 1 contributor to Kim's phenomenal success", took an active role in her daughter's skating career from the beginning, driving her to the ice rink each day, attending all of her practices, and acting as her coach, manager, spokesperson, and mentor. She played English cassette tapes in the car to help Kim improve her English skills. Kim's family often struggled to fund her skating expenses; when her father's business was not doing well enough to pay for her lessons, they put up their house as collateral for a bank loan. Kim's father chose to remain out of media attention, choosing to watch her skate on television along with her sister instead of accompanying Kim to international competitions. Both parents, however, attended the 2010 Winter Olympics in Vancouver. Kim credited both of them with her success as a figure skater. She also named American figure skaters Michelle Kwan and Sasha Cohen as well as Brian Joubert, Stéphane Lambiel, and Tomáš Verner as her influences.

Kim began skating at the age of five at a local rink with her sister. Former ice dancer Ryu Jong-hyun coached Kim between the ages of seven and ten, and former single skater Shin Hea-sook, who competed for South Korea at the 1980 Winter Olympics, guided her between 10 and 12 years old. Kim later said that Ryu and Shin both helped her, from the start of her skating career, to become who she was both technically and spiritually. Ryu suggested to Kim's mother, who noticed early on that there was something special about her daughter's skating, that Kim may receive formal training in figure skating. In an interview from 2011, she gave credit to her coaches for noticing and developing her aptitude for skating, who also told her that "her muscles and body structure are perfect for skating". Kim herself added, "I was born with a good instrument, maybe more so than the talent". Ryu cited Kim's work ethic, especially her hard work, dedication, and commitment to practice for her success. She landed her first triple toe loop jump at the age of 10 and, except for the triple Axel, she was able to perform all types of triple jumps cleanly two years later. During her middle school years, her boots often did not fit her as she matured, suffering many injuries, including a period when she had to rest for a month after a pelvic-muscle injury.

== Competitive skating career ==
=== Early career ===
In 2002, Kim competed internationally for the first time at the Triglav Trophy in Slovenia, where she completed five triple jumps and won the gold medal in the novice competition, the first international victory for a Korean woman. A year later, at age 12, she won the senior title at the South Korean Championships, becoming the youngest skater ever to do so, a record not broken until 2016 by 11-year-old You Young. She also placed first at the 2003 Golden Bear of Zagreb, a novice competition. Kim won three consecutive South Korean championships between 2003 and 2006.

=== Junior career ===
==== 2004–05 season: Junior debut ====
In the 2004–05 season, Kim competed as a junior during the ISU Junior Grand Prix. She won a gold medal at the 2004 JGP Hungary, her first international competition, and became the first Korean skater to win a Junior Grand Prix event. She placed first in both competition segments, the short program and the free skating program, scoring a combined total of 148.55 points. At her second competition, the 2004 JGP China, Kim was in fourth place after making four errors in her short program, but rebounded in the free skate to take second place overall with 131.22 points. She qualified for the 2004–05 Junior Grand Prix Final, where she won the silver medal with an overall score of 137.75 points. It was the first time that a Korean skater had won a medal at the event.

At the 2005 South Korean Championships, she won her third consecutive gold medal. In her free skate, she successfully executed a combination of two triple jumps for the first time but fell on her triple Lutz. She was ineligible to compete at the World Championships, because she did not meet the required age minimum of 15 years old. She won the silver medal at the 2005 World Junior Championships with 158.93 points overall. Coming from behind after the short program, where she had finished in sixth place, she scored 110.26 points in her free skate, with her "secret weapon" of a triple-triple jump combination. It was the first time that a Korean skater had won a medal at the Junior World Championships and the Junior Grand Prix Final.

==== 2005–06 season: World Junior champion ====
Kim lacked the corporate sponsorship to pay for her training and participation costs, so she experienced financial difficulties; the Korea Skating Union promised to underwrite her expenses so she could train out of the country. She was not old enough to compete at the 2006 Olympics; instead, she participated in the Olympic torch relay and the 2005–06 Junior Grand Prix, winning both of her competitions in Slovakia and Bulgaria. At the 2005 JGP Slovakia, she finished in first place with 168.83 points overall. At the 2005 JGP Bulgaria, despite a great deal of pain caused by the new skates that she had purchased shortly before the competition, she finished in first place after the short program with 53.45 points. She also came in first place in the free skate, with 99.98 points, and won the gold medal, with 153.43 points overall. At the 2005–06 Junior Grand Prix Final, when she was first in the junior-level ranking and where she was the youngest skater to compete, she earned 57.51 points in the short program despite a minor landing error during her final spin movement. She earned 116.61 points in the free skating program and won the gold medal with an overall score of 174.12 points.

At the 2006 South Korean Championships, Kim finished in first place with an overall score of 165.52 points. At the 2006 World Junior Championships, she was the first Korean skater to win the gold medal, scoring 177.54 points overall. Overcoming a ligament injury in her right ankle, Kim finished in first place after the short program with 60.86 points. Kim captivated the audience and won the free skate with 116.68 points, earning 177.54 points overall She was the only skater in the competition who surpassed 100 points in her free skate. This marked the first time a Korean skater had won the Junior Grand Prix Final and the World Junior Championships. It was also the eighth consecutive competition where Kim had finished in either first or second place since 2004 and raised expectations for Korea's chances of winning a gold medal at the 2010 Winter Olympics.

=== Senior career ===
==== 2006–07 season: Senior debut and World medal ====
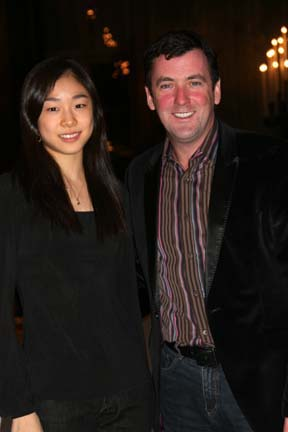
Kim and her coach, Brian Orser (right), in 2007

To prepare for her senior debut in the 2006–07 season, Kim began training with Brian Orser at the Toronto Cricket, Skating and Curling Club during the summer of 2006 after working there with choreographer David Wilson. According to International Figure Skating, she had lost her confidence and was ready to quit the sport due to her recurring knee injuries and boot problems, so her coach suggested that she train in Toronto. After three months, she decided to make Toronto her permanent base of training, living with her mother in a Korean neighborhood. At first, Orser was reluctant to agree to train her, but he identified with her competitive spirit and felt he could not turn down the challenge. According to International Figure Skating, Kim's move was controversial and her former coach publicly criticized it. Orser reported that one of his goals as her coach was to make her laugh and that he was instructed by Korean skating officials to "make Kim a happier skater". She was Orser's first real student.

Kim made her senior international debut and Orser made his coaching debut at the 2006 Skate Canada International, where she became the first Korean skater to place at a senior Grand Prix event by winning a bronze medal, placing first in the short program and fourth in the free skate, with a total overall score of 168.48 points. At the 2006 Trophée Éric Bompard, Kim became the first Korean skater to win a senior Grand Prix competition, placing first in both the short program and free skate, with a total of 184.54 points, her personal best up to that point.

Her Grand Prix performances qualified Kim for her first Grand Prix Final, in Saint Petersburg, Russia. She became the first Korean skater to both medal at and win a Grand Prix Final. She placed third in the short program and first in the free skate, earning a total of 184.20 points and defeating silver medalist Mao Asada. After the short program, Kim admitted that she was worried about her performance due to some back pain, but that she was satisfied with her results. After the free skate, she told reporters that she was surprised by the outcome and was pleased to compete with the Japanese skaters present, calling them "strong competitors".

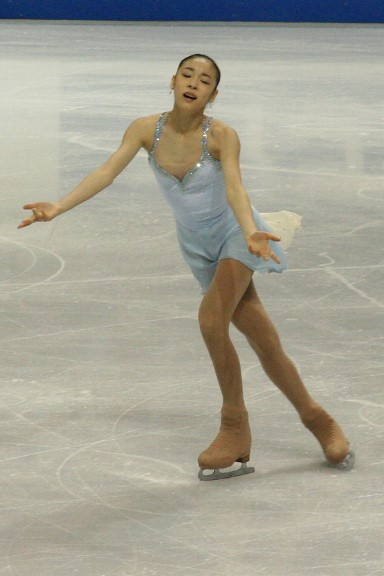
Kim performing her free skate to The Lark Ascending at the 2006 Skate Canada

Kim withdrew from the 2007 South Korean Championships, because she was diagnosed in January 2007 with the early stages of lumbar disc herniation, involving the fourth and fifth lumbar vertebrae in her waist. According to her doctor, the vertebrae pushed back and touched her nerve and the disc between her first coccyx and fifth lumbar vertebrae, which was swollen and ready to develop into a hernia. He also said that two-to-four weeks of physical therapy would successfully treat it. She began treatment, which focused on reinforcing her waist muscles and maintaining her body balance, in Seoul immediately after her diagnosis. She was unable to train during and afterwards her treatment. Kim was scheduled to compete at the 2007 Asian Winter Games, but had to withdraw.

Kim was selected to compete at the 2007 World Championships in Tokyo. Despite being on pain killers for chronic back pain and with little treatment, she won the short program with 71.95 points, setting the highest short program score ever under the ISU Judging System. Rosaleen Kaye of Golden Skate stated that Kim performed her short program "with an intensity and maturity far above her years". Kim told reporters that it was not one incident that exacerbated her back pain, although her short program put burden on her lower back. She also was nursing a tailbone injury. Kim opened her short program with a triple flip-triple toe loop combination with enough speed to carry her out of both jumps.

According to Kaye, "Elegance and superior skating skills were brilliantly displayed" during Kim's free skate at the World Championships. She accomplished her triple flip-triple toe loop combination "with wonderful flow as well as with a big smile" and her straight line footwork sequence was "light and lyrical". Kim also fell on both of her triple Lutz jumps and she performed a triple Salchow-double toe loop combination which received no credit because the judges considered it as a fourth combination jump. She finished fourth in the segment, with 114.19 points, and third overall, with a total of 186.14 points. Despite her mistakes, Kim later said that she had learned a great deal from her fellow skaters and during her first season as a senior skater. She said, after winning the gold medal at the 2009 World Championships, that even though she did her personal best in the short program in 2007, she did not do as well in the free skate.

==== 2007–08 season: Second world medal ====
At the beginning of the 2007–08 season, Orser created a team of specialists to work with Kim, including three-time Dutch national champion Astrid Jansen, who became her spin coach, and former Canadian ice dancer Tracy Wilson, who helped Kim develop her all-around skating quality, her stroking skills, and her expression. David Wilson also became Kim's full-time choreographer. Her team focused on her triple loop jump, which Orser called her "nemesis jump". Orser was impressed with Kim's skating abilities, her ability to learn choreography quickly and well, her creativity, and her openness to learning new skills. International Figure Skating reported that Kim had a positive influence and was a good role model for the younger skaters who trained with her in Toronto. Kim reported that training in Toronto was an escape from the great fame and "media circus" she faced daily in Korea.

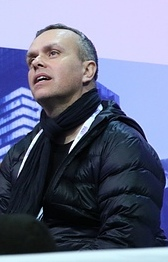
Choreographer David Wilson, 2016

Kim began the season by becoming the first Korean skater to win the 2007 Cup of China, with a total score of 180.68 points. In the short program, she landed a triple Lutz, a double Axel, and successfully performed three spins, but a failed triple flip-single toe loop combination caused her to finish the segment in third place. Golden Skate reported that her disappointment was clear as she entered the kiss-and-cry and that she later admitted that she was nervous after popping her jump. In the free skate, Kim landed a triple flip-triple toe loop combination, a triple loop, triple Lutz-double toe loop combination, and a double Axel-triple toe loop combination. She scored 122.36 points and was the only skater in the competition who received no deductions for the free skate. Kim later admitted that she was not satisfied with her free skate and vowed to work on it before her next competition. Kim became the first Korean skater to win a gold medal at the 2007 Cup of Russia. She called the competition at Cup of Russia "very strong". She won the short program, scoring 63.50 points, which was a new season best for her; reporter Anna Kondkova called it "a nearly flawless performance". Kim successfully executed her triple flip-triple toe loop combination, but struggled landing her triple Lutz and singled her double Axel. Despite the errors, she "expressed an excellent waltz character." She later said that she was pleased with her result. Kim also won the free skate with 133.70 points, finishing first overall with 197.20 points, and set a world record for the free skate score under the ISU Judging System. She later said that her jumps felt shaky and that she felt that she had elements she could improve and vowed to work on them.

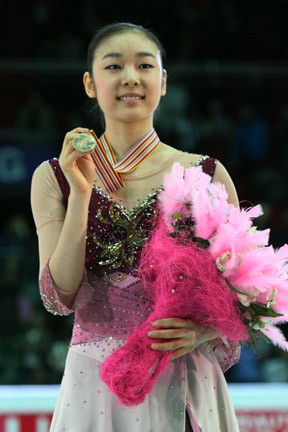
Kim on the podium at the 2008 World Championships

Kim qualified for the 2007–08 Grand Prix Final in Turin, Italy; she and Mao Asada had both earned the maximum 30 points to advance. She won the short program with 64.62 points, a season's best score. Skating last, she "performed nearly perfect, except the failure of her starting jump". She lost her balance during the first jump of her triple flip-triple toe loop combination, forcing her to touch both her hands on the ice and singling out her subsequent jumps in the combination. Despite the one error, she cleanly skated the rest of her program. The Korea Times called Kim's spiral sequences "superb" and reported that she also completed a double Axel and all her spins "without flaw". Kim placed second in the free skate with 132.21 points; Asada came from behind from sixth place in the short program to first place in the free skate and won her second consecutive silver medal at the finals. Kim fell early in her routine, but was able to successfully land six triple jumps. With a total score of 196.83 points, Kim swept the Grand Prix series and won her second consecutive Grand Prix Final, the youngest skater in the world to do so.

Kim was not required to compete in the 2008 South Korean Championships, because she had already qualified for the World Championships and the Four Continents Championships, although a hip injury and chronic hip pain prevented her from competing at Four Continents. Even though she had to take pain killers, Kim competed at the World Championships in Gothenburg, Sweden. She was placed fifth in the short program with 59.85 points, but rebounded in the free skate to win the program with 123.38. Despite seriously considering dropping out of the competition several times, she scored 183.23 points overall, and won her second consecutive bronze medal at the World Championships. In her free skate, she landed several combination jumps; her only error was during her second Lutz jump. She later told reporters that she planned on taking the next two months to rest and take care of her injury, and then return to training in Canada. It was the first time a Korean skater had repeated as a medalist at the World Championships.

==== 2008–09 season: First World title ====
Kim was assigned to the 2008 Skate America and the 2008 Cup of China for the 2008–09 Grand Prix season. The week before competing at Skate America, Kim was accepted into Korea University. Going into Skate America, she said that she felt healthy; according to figure skating reporter Lynn Rutherford, she showed no signs of the injuries that plagued her during the previous season. Both Orser and Kim reported that she was healthy and had a new physical therapist and a new trainer. Kim told reporters that her goal for the season was to remain healthy and that she had learned how to both recover from her injuries and prevent them from happening. After the 2008 World Championships, Kim's coaching team decided it was time for her to have more input in her program music, crediting their rapport and good communication as helping with the process. Orser felt she had "come into her own in terms of maturity and development".

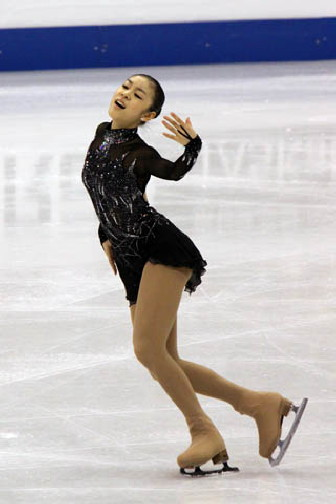
Kim performing her short program to Danse Macabre at the 2009 World Championships

After Wilson and choreographer Shae-Lynn Bourne made several proposals for her short program music, Kim used Danse Macabre by Camille Saint-Saëns. For her free skate, she chose music from Nikolai Rimsky-Korsakov's Scheherazade after seeing another skater use it four years earlier. Kim placed first in the short program at Skate America with a score of 69.50, despite trouble with her double Axel. Rutherford reported that Kim "sparkled" during her practices. She was the only competitor in the short program to skate a clean triple-triple combination jump and scored 10.70 points on her triple flip-triple toe combination jump, her first jump of the program; all eight of her elements, except her double Axel, earned her positive GOEs.

Kim captured the gold medal, winning the free skate with a score of 123.95, and earning 193.45 points overall. According to The Korea Times, Kim "pulled off a series of near-perfect jumps and an eloquent spiral sequence" in her free skating program. She landed six triple jumps, including her opening triple flip-triple toe jump combination, the only triple-triple jump combination in the competition not downgraded by the judges. She later expressed appreciation to the large Korean contingent in the audience.

Kim won the 2008 Cup of China, where she received a score of 63.64 in the short program and 128.11 in the free skate, placing first in both. Kim made errors in her short program; she two-footed and under-rotated her triple Lutz, which was downgraded to a double jump. In Kim's free skate, she demonstrated an "iron will" and successfully executed five clean triple jumps, including her trademark triple flip-triple toe loop. She stepped out of her first triple Lutz, which she did not think affected her score, so she added a double toe jump to the end of her second triple Lutz. Kim returned to Toronto to rest and to further improve her programs; she later admitted that she was "quite exhausted" after the Cup of China.

With the highest qualifying score, Kim qualified for the 2008 Grand Prix Final, which was held in Goyang, the first time the event was held in South Korea. She arrived in Goyang feeling a great deal of pressure, but told reporters that she was looking forward to skating in her home country. Tickets for the event sold out minutes after they were placed on sale. Kim placed first in the short program with 65.94 points, well below her personal best, and second in the free skate where she earned 120.41 points. After placing first place at the finals the previous two seasons, she won the silver medal with a total score of 186.35 points. She landed a "beautiful" triple flip-triple toe loop combination jump at the start of her short program, flubbed her planned triple Lutz, and then successfully completed a double Axel. She later admitted that the timing on her Lutz "wasn't so great", but she was satisfied with her other elements and said that since last season, she had learned to recover from her errors. Kim opened her free skating program with a strong triple flip-triple toe loop combination, which she followed up with a double Axel-triple toe loop combination. She flubbed her planned triple Lutz and fell on her triple Salchow, but was able to land her double Axel at the end of the program. She later complained of suffering from a cold and although she enjoyed skating in Korea, she spoke of feeling the pressure of competing there.

Kim then competed at the 2009 Four Continents Championships in Vancouver, Canada. She set a new world record of 72.24 points in the short program with a clean performance. Asada finished a "shocking" sixth place after the short . Opening with a "beautiful" triple flip-triple toe loop combination jump, Kim was the only one of the top six women in the competition to get credit for a triple-triple combination. According to Laurie Nealin of Ice Network, "Kim skated without evident flaw, sailing through jump after jump and igniting the audience". She scored 116.83 in the free skating program, keeping the lead with 189.07 points overall and winning the gold medal. Kang Seung-woo from The Korea Times stated that Kim's success "brightened prospects for a first figure skating medal for the Far East nation in the Winter Games". Kim was happy with her free skating performance, despite falling after her triple loop jump, a jump she had not been able to successfully accomplish all season. She was able to land her triple Lutz-double toe loop-double loop combination jump, which was downgraded, and completed her double Axel-triple toe loop combination jump.

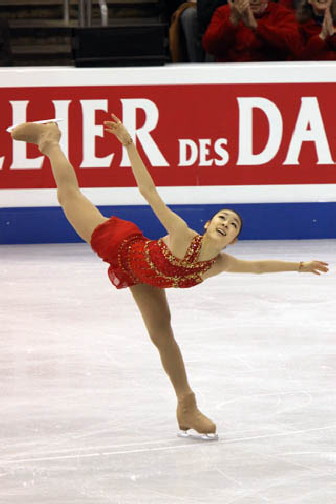
Kim performing her free skate at the 2009 Worlds Championships

During the 2009 World Championships in Los Angeles, Kim set another new world record of 76.12 points in the short program, surpassing her previous record by four points. Orser, who later said that Kim was well-trained, stated about Kim's short program, "I think this was one of those moments people will always remember, especially those judges". She began her program with her triple flip-triple toe loop combination jump, which Yoon Chul of The Korea Times called "undoubtedly perfect", and a triple Lutz, which was followed by "a superb" spiral sequence. Chul reported that Kim skated with energy and confidence and that the audience gave her a standing ovation. She later expressed her appreciation for her Korean fans in the audience during her short program.

Kim won the free skate, and set a new world record total score of 207.71, winning her first World Championship title, as well as becoming the first female skater to surpass 200 points under the ISU Judging System. Her win also established her as a contender for the 2010 Winter Olympics. Juliet Macur of The New York Times stated about Kim's free skate, "For the second night in a row, Kim performed yet another elegant, effortless routine that enthralled the crowd and the judges". She successfully executed five triple jumps, three in combination, which included a triple flip-triple toe loop combination at the start of the program. She chose to replace her triple loop with an Ina Bauer going into a double Axel because although triple loops were worth more points, errors that resulted in a loss of points were more common. The addition of the Ina Bauer also increased her component scores. Kang Seung-woo of The Korea Times stated, "She performed a remarkably charismatic dance, demonstrating flexibility and powerful energy before an awestruck crowd". The Associated Press (AP) reported that Kim's footwork was "exquisite" and that she "skated with the elegance of a queen". The audience began their standing ovation for Kim before the end of her free skate; the AP called her performance "magical" and added that by the end, the audience had forgotten her errors. She later said that winning the World Championships was the fulfillment of a dream and that she wanted to win because it was the last World Championships before the Olympics. According to Orser, Kim gained a new confidence after winning her first World title. Macur reported that it was the biggest goal of Kim's career thus far.

==== 2009–10 season: First Olympics ====
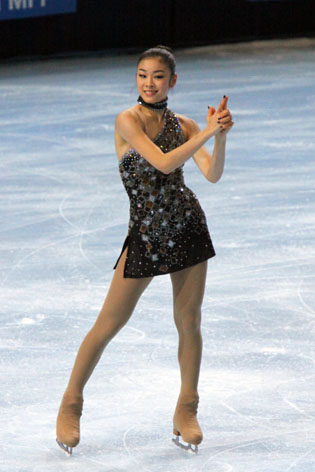
Kim performing her short program to a James Bond medley at the 2009 Trophée Éric Bompard

Kim's goal for the 2009–10 season was to develop her programs, as well as her expression, character, and makeup, in order to demonstrate more maturity. Juliet Macur from The New York Times stated that Kim's short program, which depicted her "as a sexy, confident Bond girl," "sizzled" and that Kim performed her free skating program "with the grace of a prima ballerina".

Kim was assigned to the 2009 Trophée Éric Bompard and the 2009 Skate America for the 2009–10 ISU Grand Prix season. At the Trophée Éric Bompard, she placed first in the short program with a score of 76.08 points. After her performance, she pumped her fists and waved to the audience. She won the event with 210.03 points. Kim broke her own world records for both the free skate and the overall score.

At the 2009 Skate America, Kim placed first again after the short program with a score of 76.28, ahead of her closest competitor Rachael Flatt from the United States. Kim set a new world record for the short program, marking the fourth straight competition in which she broke world records. As Lynn Rutherford stated in Ice Network, "None of her world records are safe. She'll break them again and again". Kim later said that every competition was important to her and she considered them practice for the Olympics. After her short program, Kim told reporters that she was not sure about using music from the Bond films, but eventually came around to the idea because she liked the choreography created by Wilson and felt that it was a good choice for an Olympic year. Orser told reporters that even with Kim's multiple wins, he was "taking nothing for granted". Kim placed second in the free skate with a score of 111.70 points, but won the event with 187.98 points. The South Korean newspaper The Chosun Ilbo called Kim "the clear favorite for the gold" in Vancouver and "in a league of her own".

Kim's victories at both Grand Prix events qualified her for the 2009–10 Grand Prix Final in Tokyo, Japan, in December 2009, with a total of 30 points, the highest score of all the qualifiers. She placed second in the short program with 65.64 points. The next day, she won the free skate with 123.22 points. As a result, Kim won every competition she had entered in 2009 and her third Grand Prix Final title with a total of 188.86 points. In mid-December, she was chosen to carry the Olympic torch for the second time, running about 300 meters in downtown Hamilton, an hour's drive from where she trained in Toronto.

In February 2010, Kim competed in the women's event at the 2010 Winter Olympics, where she won Olympic gold. In March 2010, Kim competed at the 2010 World Championships in Turin, Italy. Kim said she had struggled with finding the motivation to compete at the World Championships after winning the gold medal at the Olympics. Kim placed seventh in the short program with 60.30 points, the third-worst lowest score of her career and the first time she did not place into the top five. She rebounded in the free skate to win the program with 130.49 points, and won the silver medal with a total of 190.79 points. Kim later admitted that Worlds were mentally difficult for her and that she had seriously considered pulling out of the competition.

===== 2010 Winter Olympics: Gold medal =====
In February 2010, Kim competed in the women's event at the 2010 Winter Olympic Games, held in Vancouver, Canada. She entered the Games as a strong favourite to win the gold. The New York Times reported on the great amount of pressure Kim felt going into the Olympics, but told the newspaper that she was "prepared for anything". Kim chose to stay at an inexpensive hotel instead of at the Olympic Village; her mother, Orser, and David Wilson also stayed in the same hotel.

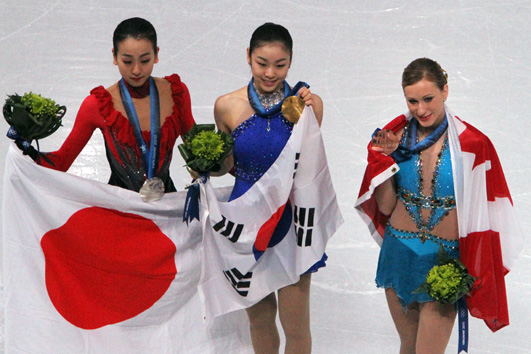
At the 2010 Winter Olympics, with Mao Asada (on the left) and Joannie Rochette (on the right)

In the short program, Kim executed a triple Lutz-triple toe loop combination jump, which reporter Philip Hersh called "stratospheric", a triple flip, and a double Axel. Kim scored 78.50 points. Kim accomplished her best score in the short program, breaking her own world record by over two points. She later told reporters that she felt no pressure going into the free skate. On February 25, Kim won the free skate, which Agence France-Presse called "a stunning performance" and "spellbinding", with 150.06 points, setting a new world record for the free skate. Overall, Kim totaled 228.56 points, breaking her own personal best and previous world record. Philip Hersh stated that her Olympic free skate was "of transcendent brilliance that brought her immortality in South Korea". She won the gold medal, becoming the first South Korean skater to medal in any discipline of figure skating at the Olympic Games. She defeated silver medalist Mao Asada by 23.06 points, the greatest margin recorded in women's singles at the Olympics or World Championships since the introduction of the ISU Judging System.

Kim's short program, free skate, and combined total scores at the 2010 Winter Olympics were the highest scores since the creation of the ISU Judging System, and were registered in the Guinness World Records. Dorothy Hamill, the 1976 Olympic champion, said that Kim had "jaw-dropping magnificence", adding "The height of her jumps, the power, and the fluid beauty of her skating are like magic". Jacques Rogge, then-president of the International Olympic Committee, stated that Kim's performance "touched me in a way that I haven't been touched since Torvill and Dean in Sarajevo". U.S. Secretary of State Hillary Clinton, who met with and congratulated South Korean Foreign Minister Yu Myung-hwan the following day, also praised Kim's performance, calling it "extraordinary". In South Korea, the stock market halted all business during Kim's performances. She and Orser flew immediately to Seoul after the Olympics to meet with South Korean president Lee Myung-bak at his official residence. Christopher Clarey from The New York Times reported that Kim considered retiring from competition at the end of the season.

==== 2010–11 and 2011–12 seasons: Coaching change and hiatus ====
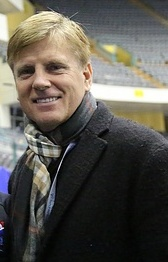
Coach Peter Oppegard, 2016

In August 2010, Kim and Brian Orser parted ways. According to the Associated Press, it was "a move that has taken many by surprise—Orser included" and according to Reuters, no reason was given for the decision. Orser stated that his firing was "out of the blue". David Wilson called the split "like a nightmare". The Toronto Star reported that later that same month, Orser leaked, without permission, the music Kim had planned to use for her free skating program during the upcoming season, something frowned upon in figure skating. At first, Kim continued to train in Toronto without a coach and no plans to hire one. By the fall of 2010, she began training in Artesia, California, at the East West Ice Palace, a rink owned and operated by Michelle Kwan's family. In October, after her camp asked Wilson to coach her, an offer he refused, she hired Peter Oppegard and continued to work with Wilson as her choreographer.

Kim was assigned to the 2010 Cup of China and to the 2010 Cup of Russia for the 2010–11 ISU Grand Prix season. However, she chose not to compete in the Grand Prix series to focus on the 2011 World Championships in Moscow, her only competition of the season and her first competition in over a year. American coach Frank Carroll, while recognizing the difficulty of competing after such a long period, stated that she had "the guts and the strength of character to do it". She told CNN that her focus, instead of being on the results, was to enjoy and show a different side of herself. Kim also chose not to compete at the 2011 Four Continents Championships, because the previous Olympics had sapped her energy.

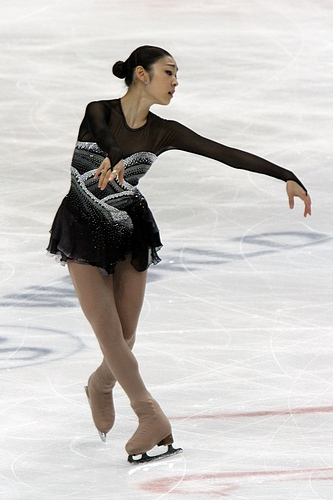
Kim performing her free skate to "Homage to Korea" at the 2011 World Championships

A large contingent of reporters from South Korea and Japan were at the World Championships, but Kim did not experience as much pressure compared to the Olympics. Skating to music from Giselle, she placed first in the short program, with 65.91 points. She stumbled out of her triple Lutz, so she was unable to include her planned triple-triple combination jump, but she added a double toe loop to her planned triple flip in order to fulfill the combination jump requirement. Oppegard later told reporters that he thought that Kim was nervous because it was her first competition in a year. Kim told reporters that getting back into training was difficult and that she often lacked the motivation to continue. Kim came in second in the free skate with 128.59 points and won the silver medal, with a total score of 194.50 points. Skating to Korean music, which she called "a love letter to my country", Kim landed her opening triple Lutz-triple toe loop combination jump and landed another triple Lutz and two triple Salchows, but she flubbed her flip jump. Golden Skate reported that Kim "continued her impressive record" of earning a medal in every competition she had entered since the Junior Grand Prix in 2005.

Kim said she might miss the next Grand Prix series due to her work promoting South Korea's successful bid for the 2018 Winter Olympics. On October 18, 2011, she officially announced she would be sitting out the entire 2011–12 season, the first time in her junior and senior careers. She later said that she took the break due to the high expectations and pressure she felt going into the Vancouver Olympics.

==== 2012–2013 season: Second World title ====
In July 2012, Kim announced her intention to skate competitively in the 2012–13 season, with the ultimate goal of skating at the 2014 Winter Olympics in Sochi, Russia. She later told Nancy Armour of the Associated Press that she was "determined not to be suffocated by the pressure again". She said that returning to competition after winning the Olympics and after a long break was difficult, but that she felt less pressure because she was not as desperate to win. She told reporters that she had no regrets for taking so much time off from competitive skating and although she recognized she had her work cut out for her, she considered Sochi an opportunity to start over. She also told reporters that she found inspiration from younger Korean skaters while training at home during her break. Despite her past successes, however, Kim was not invited to skate in the 2012–13 Grand Prix circuit, so she chose to compete in minor events to score enough technical points to qualify for the 2013 World Championships.

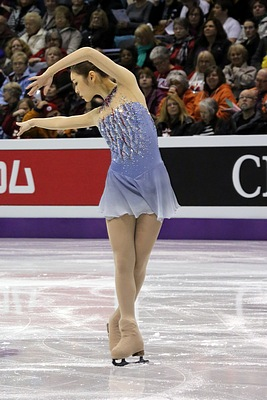
Kim performing her short program at the 2013 World Championships

Kim left Oppegard and began training with her childhood coaches Shin Hea-sook and Ryu Jong-hyun. Her coaches reported that Kim's technique was no problem, even after her long break, but that they were working on her stamina in training. Shin was in charge of Kim's overall training and Ryu was in charge of her fitness training and conditioning. Kim chose music from the 1963 film Kiss of the Vampire for her short program and selections from the musical Les Misérables for her free skate. She used movie and musical soundtracks because she wanted to use something new.

Kim's first competition of the season was the 2012 NRW Trophy in Dortmund, Germany. It was the first time she had competed since 2011. Reporter Moon Gwang-lip called it "an impressive comeback". Tickets to the NRW Trophy sold out in six hours and instead of the few media outlets that would usually attend this event, over fifty credentials, which included several news outlets, were issued. Although it was not important for her to win the competition, she placed first in the short program with a score of 72.27 points and also won the free skate with 129.34 points to claim the gold medal. Klaus-Reinhold Kany of Ice Network pointed out that because the NRW Trophy was a minor international competition, the ISU did not include Kim's short program score in its list of the season's best rankings, even though her score was the highest recorded that season. She needed to earn 48 points in her technical element scores during her free skate in order to qualify for the 2013 World Championships, which she easily did. She had applied to compete at the Golden Spin of Zagreb, in case she did not earn enough points, but withdrew her application after the NRW Trophy.

Kim later admitted that she felt nervous during the warm-up before her free skate, but she kept her nerves under control and considered skating at a minor competition a positive experience. She also stated that she concentrated on her elements, but intended to improve upon her free skate's choreography and emotional aspect and was looking towards the South Korean Championships and the 2014 Olympics. Moon reported that Kim began her free skate "with indelible poise and sublime grace... launching herself fearlessly into jumps and landing with implausible softness". Kany called Kim's opening triple Lutz-triple toe loop combination jump "brilliant"; Kim also successfully executed a triple flip that earned her a +2 GOE, two additional triples, and a double Axel coming out of an Ina Bauer, although she singled her first Axel, turned her two planned double toe loops into single jumps, and fell during her triple Salchow-double toe combination jump. Kany stated, however, that although she appeared tired towards the end, the rest of her program was "solid". With the technical qualifications met, Kim's agency said she would focus on the 2013 South Korean Championships and the 2013 World Championships. Kim also told reporters that she was enjoying her reunion with Shin and Ryu, and that she had missed training at home in Korea.

Kim was a strong favourite to win the South Korean Championships. She skated a clean short program, placing first with a score of 64.97. She also won the free skate with a score of 145.80 points and 210.77 points overall. She won her fifth national title and qualified to compete in the World Championships. Koh Dong-wook of Yonhap News Agency, who called Kim's free skate a "flawless performance", reported that even though she felt nervous going into the free skate because of a fall during practice, she completed her program with no errors.

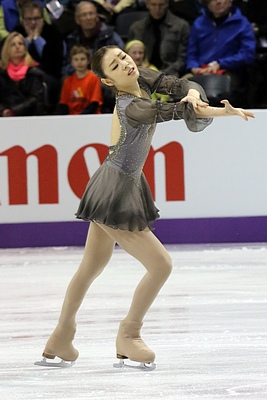
Kim performing her free skate to Les Misérables at the 2013 World Championships

At the 2013 World Championships and looking to win her second World title, Kim placed first in the short program with a score of 69.97 points. She completed a triple Lutz-triple toe loop combination jump, a triple flip, which was downgraded due to her take-off on the wrong edge of her skate, and a double Axel. According to The Korea Herald, she also "performed flawless spins and step sequences the rest of the way". She later told reporters that she was disappointed with her score, but had no regrets about her short program. She also said that she enjoyed skating "in the middle of the pack" because skating later on made her more nervous.

Kim also won the free skate after executing a clean program that earned her 148.34 points. With 218.31 points overall, Kim claimed her second world title, surpassing the rest of the competitors by 20.43 points, the largest difference between gold and silver in the nine years the ISU Judging System had been used in the World Championships. Her free skate included a "string of perfectly executed triple-triple combinations". As Nancy Armour of the Associated Press said, Kim "could have stood at center ice for the second half of her program and still won". Kim, who told reporters that she felt less pressure, also seemed "able to enjoy the moment". Armour speculated that if Kim continued to skate like that in Sochi, she would be hard to beat at the Olympics. Kim received a standing ovation for her free skate, which Philip Hersh of the Chicago Tribune called "an ethereal free skate of surpassing brilliance". Last to skate, her free skate included six "flawless" jumps, one of which was in combination. Kim said later that she felt happy with her free skate; she also said that it was the first time she no longer focused on the results, but had been able to enjoy both skating and competing. Up to that point, Kim had earned medals at all 30 of her international competitions, both at the junior and senior levels, and had won gold medals at 19 of them.

==== 2013–2014 season: Olympic silver medal and retirement from competition ====
For the 2013–14 ISU Grand Prix season, Kim was assigned to compete in the 2013 Skate Canada International and in the 2013 Trophée Éric Bompard. However, on September 26, it was announced that Kim would not compete in the Grand Prix series due to a metatarsal injury to her right foot (bruised bones) from excessive training, with recovery expected to take up to six weeks.

Kim competed in the 2013 Golden Spin of Zagreb, her first competition in nine months. She placed first in the short program with a score of 73.37 points and won the free skate with 131.12 points. Yoo Jee-ho of Yonhap News Agency stated that Kim's choice of music for her short program, "Send in the Clowns", was a departure from her recent choices, which tended to be set to "more powerful tunes" and could have fallen flat in its choreography, but that Kim made up for it with "a series of exquisite steps and spins". She earned the highest short program component scores of her career and the highest short program score in the Grand Prix that season. Her overall score was the fifth-best of her career and the third consecutive time she scored over 200 points.

In early January, Kim competed in the 2014 South Korean Championships. She finished first after the short program with 80.60 points, which was her personal best score, and won the free skate, which was called "flawless", with 147.26 points. Kim won her sixth national title with a total score of 227.86 points, the second-highest score ever earned. Yonhap News Agency stated that Kim's victory raised expectations for winning a second gold medal at the Olympics.

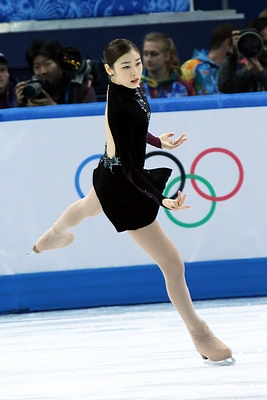
Kim performing her free skate to Adiós Nonino at the 2014 Sochi Olympics

In February 2014, Kim competed at the 2014 Winter Olympic Games, seeking to become the first woman to win back-to-back Olympic gold medals since Katarina Witt and with the intention of retiring from competitive skating afterwards. According to Moon Gwang-lip of Korea JoongAng Daily, she did not want to not feel burdened or pressured and wished to finish her career with no regrets. She narrowly came in first place after the short program with 74.92 points. Kim skated earlier than the other favorite competitors, due to her lower international standing, although she later said that it lessened her pressure. She skated last in the free skate. Kim later admitted that she was not as motivated as she was in Vancouver. Her overall score was 219.11 points, 5.5 points less than Sotnikova's score. Her silver medal win was, as Graham called it, "controversial", and said that it "strikes a blow to the artistry that sets figure skating apart from all other sports—and to many, seems to stink of corruption". Graham cited Sotnikova's free skate score, 149.95 points, which was 40 points higher than her average score over the previous year and less than one point than Kim's free skating score in Vancouver, as well as impropriety about two judges, as the reasons for the controversy. Kim declined to comment on the controversy at the press conference after the Olympics and told Philip Hersh in 2020 that her feelings about it had not changed.

In 2023, the Korean Sport & Olympic Committee requested that the International Olympic Committee (IOC) re-investigate the results of the women's figure skating competition in Sochi after Sotnikova admitted to failing her first doping test earlier that year, but the IOC refused. As anticipated, Kim announced that the 2014 Olympics would mark the end of her competitive skating career and that she would not compete at the 2014 World Championships. During an interview in 2016, David Wilson expressed his "great disappointment" about her retirement.

=== Coaches ===
- Shin Hea-sook (2012–2014)
- Ryu Jong-hyun (2012–2014)
- Peter Oppegard (2010–11)
- Brian Orser (2006–2010)
- Kim Se-yol
- Chi Hyun-jung
- Ryu Jong-hyun (2000–2002)
- Shin Hea-sook (1997–2000)

== Professional skating career ==
Kim participated in the South Korean ice show, Superstars on Ice, in 2006, shortly before her senior debut, and in the Japanese show Dreams on Ice the following year. Between 2008 and 2010, she performed in Festa on Ice, produced by her agency, IB Sports. She hosted a charity ice show, Angels on Ice, on December 25, 2008, in Seoul, appearing alongside 2008 World bronze medallist Johnny Weir and ten young South Korean figure skaters. Kim stated she wanted to show her gratitude to local fans for their support. In April 2009, she headlined three shows in Korea. IB Sports produced another ice show, Ice All Stars, which took place in Seoul on August 14–16, 2009. Michelle Kwan also performed.

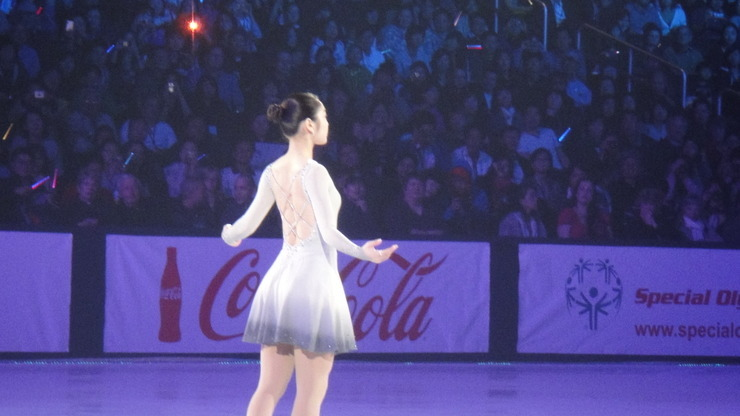
Kim performs her exhibition to "Méditation" at the 2010 All That Skate LA

In April 2010, Kim left IB Sports and with her mother, set up her own management agency called All That Sports Corporation (AT Sports). They organized an ice show, All That Skate, which as of 2020, was held annually. In October 2010, AT Sports debuted All That Skate LA, an American version of their Korean ice show brand, at the Staples Center in Los Angeles. The show, directed by David Wilson, featured Kwan, the reigning Olympic champions from three skating disciplines including Kim, and many world champions. It received positive reviews from both figure skating fans and critics for bringing a new style of skating show to the U.S. and for overall high production quality.

In June 2012, Kim took part in Artistry on Ice in China. According to Li Sheng, president of SECA, the host of the show, it took two years to attract Kim. He added, "It's a breakthrough in Artistry on Ice, and even in China's figure skating history, although she only took part in the Shanghai stop". Kim held farewell ice shows in Seoul following her retirement from competition in 2014. In 2018, she made a special appearance in an All That Skate show, performing on the ice for the first time in four years. She skated to the song "House of Woodcock" from the soundtrack of the film Phantom Thread, which she thought was not flashy or dramatic and suited her well. She worked with David Wilson in Canada to develop the program, even though they had not spoken in four years. Kim also mentored younger skaters who appeared in the show. Kim did not include any jumps in her show program, but wanted a program that was "pure and beautiful, not dramatic". She "enthralled the crowd" with her signature Ina Bauer and Yuna camel, as well as a new twizzle spin. The audience gave her a standing ovation. Also in 2018, she appeared in the Spanish ice show Revolution on Ice, hosted by Javier Fernández. She donated her skater's fee to UNICEF. In 2019, Kim performed again in All That Skate, using music from Variations from the Russian song "Dark Eyes" and the 2017 Julia Michaels song "Issues". Wilson and Sandra Besic created the program's choreography.

In 2010, Kim told Susannah Palk of CNN that the tickets to the shows she headlined sold out a few minutes after going on sale. She also said that her fellow performers wanted to return to her shows because of the audience's responses. In 2009, Canadian singles skater Patrick Chan said that he and other skaters, including Canadian ice dancers Tessa Virtue and Scott Moir, enjoyed performing at Kim's ice shows because of the enthusiastic reactions from the audiences.

== Skating technique and style ==
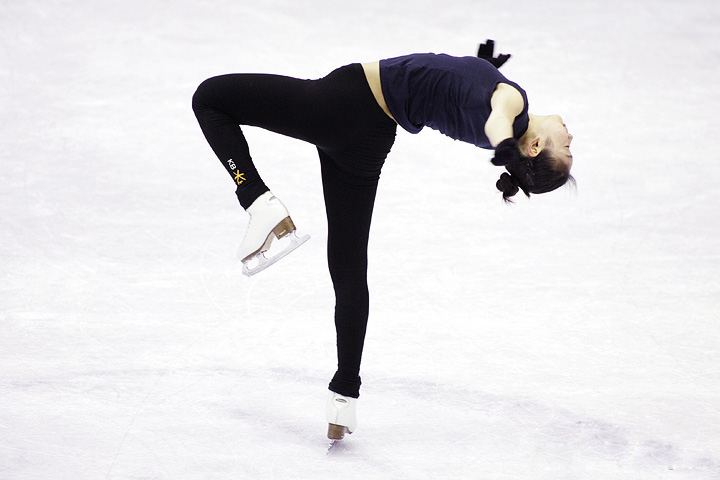
Kim performs a bent-leg layover camel spin during practice at the 2008–2009 Grand Prix Final

Kim was known for the "lighter-than-air grace in her movements on the ice", her jumps, her speed, and her grounding in the demands of the ISU judging system. According to Michelle Kwan, Kim was what competition judges were looking for, "when it comes to jump quality, spin quality and edges". She was known for her execution of her triple Lutz-triple toe loop combination jump, and her "signature" layover spin, also called the "Yuna Camel". In 2009, the Associated Press praised Kim's ease, lightness, speed, power, strength, and landings. In 2020, Scott Hamilton stated that Kim was the best model of how to earn the most points under the IJS, especially her component scores and praised her speed, technique, and spiral sequences.

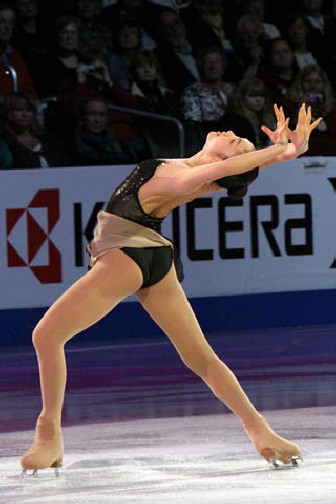
Kim performs a layback Ina Bauer at the 2009 World Championships

During Kim's junior years, South Korea had limited facilities for figure skaters, which impacted Kim's training. Early in Kim's skating career, her parents were her most important financial support for her career, although the South Korean skating community provided her with grants to pay for her training expenses. One of Kim's first coaches in South Korea, Ryu Jong-hyun, considered the injuries Kim struggled with early on "almost routine"; Korean news outlet KBS Global considered her 2005 Junior Grand Prix Final win an example of Kim's ability to overcome obstacles and her "invincible determination". In the summer of 2006, Kim relocated to Toronto to work with choreographer David Wilson and her coach, Brian Orser. Juliet Macur of The New York Times called it "the turning point of her career". Her team of specialists worked with her on her presentation skills, on her interpersonal skills, and the treatment and prevention of her injuries. In 2010, Orser said that Kim was able to lead a more "normal life" in Toronto, without the great fame she experienced in South Korea. In 2009, she told Golden Skate that she liked to be "perfectly prepared", and that when she was, she felt that she was able to give a better performance.

According to Bae Young-eun of The Dong-a Ilbo, Kim had "no rival in terms of artistry". Music was as important a part of her skating as her elements were and was part of the reason for her success. Despite the pressure she felt as a skater, she did not compete to win competitions or for her country, but that she did it for herself. Kim was highly praised for her skating and presentation skills. Philip Hersh of the Los Angeles Times said about Kim, after the Vancouver Olympics, "Never have athlete and artist been more perfectly balanced than they are with Kim. Never has a skater with both those qualities displayed them so flawlessly in the sport's most important competition". Frank Carroll, who was Michelle Kwan's coach, said that Kim was able to combine athletics and creativity, despite it being "almost impossible" under the new judging system.

=== Collaboration with David Wilson ===
David Wilson initially began working with Kim as her choreographer prior to the 2006–07 season, shortly after her 2006 Junior World Champion title. He choreographed all of Kim's competitive programs from the 2007–08 season to her retirement in 2014. Wilson later said that it was a challenge to connect with her because she expressed very little emotion and spoke almost no English and that he spent the first three months getting Kim to smile and to laugh. Eventually Kim relaxed and learned to use facial expressions to win over both her audiences and the judges. Wilson praised Kim's work ethic, noting that she "took everything [he] said to heart" and said that she believed in him, which was fulfilling, adding that she had never been rude or temperamental with him. He called her "an absolute dream" to work with. He also praised her integrity as a person.

== Legacy and impact ==
=== Impact on figure skating ===
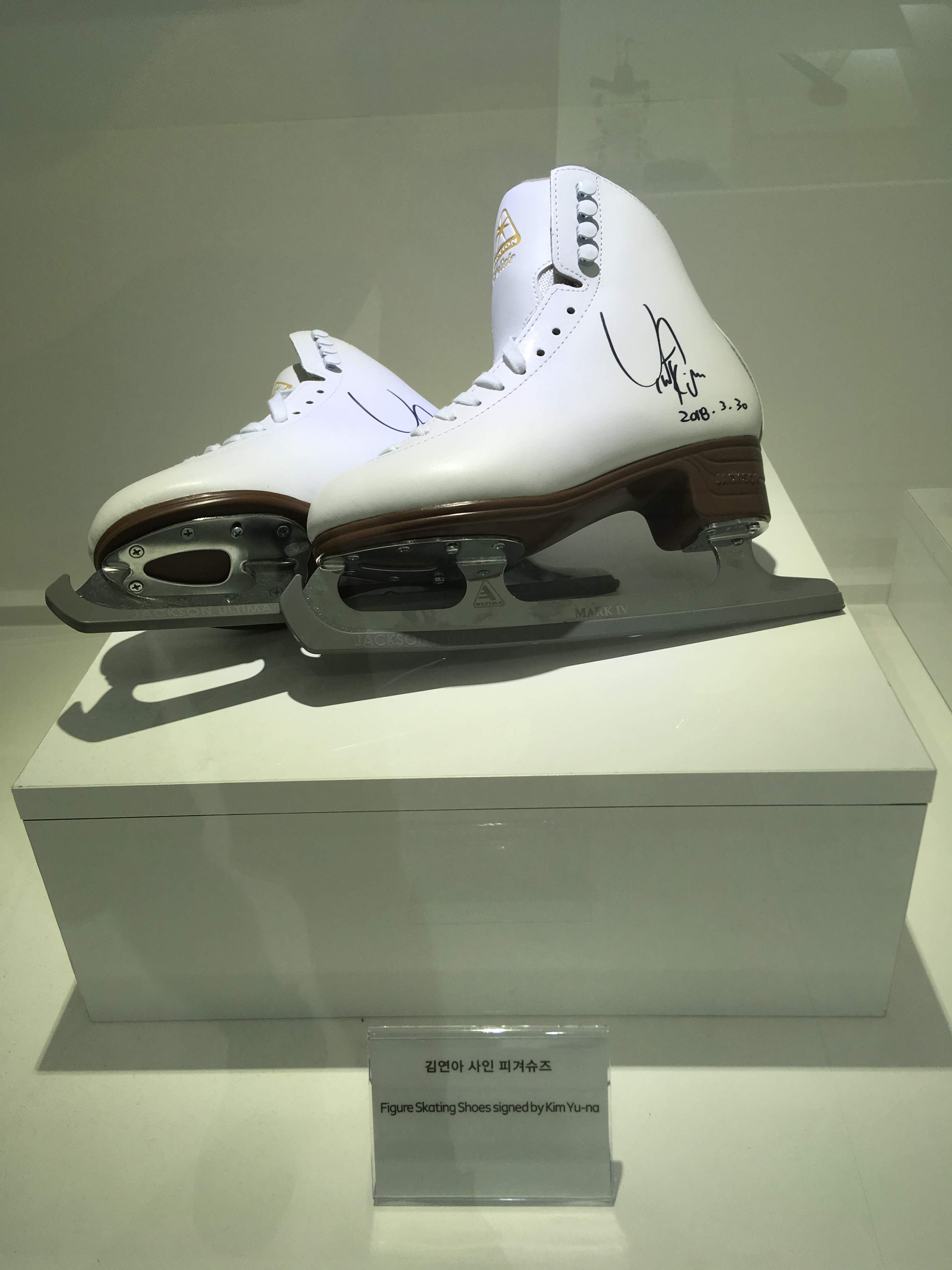
Figure skating shoes signed by Kim at the Gangneung Olympic Museum

As early as 2005, it was reported that Kim's success boosted the popularity of figure skating in South Korea, where she was called "Queen Yuna". As Philip Hersh stated shortly before the 2010 Olympics, no other figure skater was as celebrated as Kim was in her country. Former skater and Kim's coach in 2005, Chi Hyun-jung, stated that Kim's success served as a turning point for skating in South Korea and expressed the hope that it would produce more competitors there. In 2020, her coach, Brian Orser, said that Kim's performances at the 2010 Olympics were among the greatest ever and that she inspired thousands of South Korean girls to take up figure skating. International Figure Skating magazine stated in 2009 that some felt that she was the invigoration figure skating needed. In 2010, according to Forbes magazine, she was one of the highest paid athletes in the world.

Kim and Japanese skater Mao Asada were called rivals since they competed as juniors. In 2009, when Kim won the Worlds Championships and Asada came in second place, the Associated Press called their rivalry "the best thing going in skating these days" and stated that it was the reason for their fame in their respective countries.

=== Olympic ambassador ===
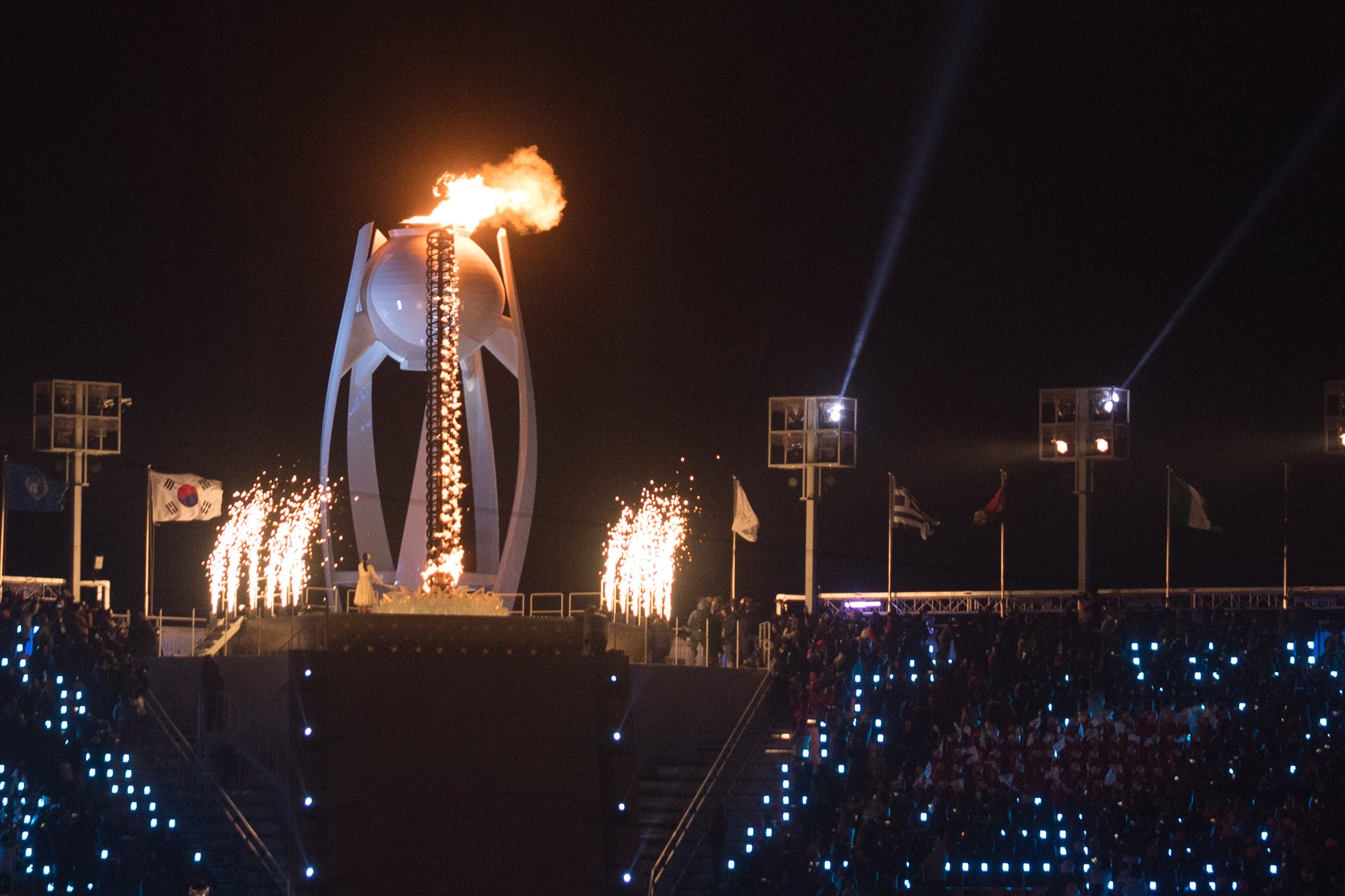
2018 Olympics opening ceremony, after Kim lit the Olympic cauldron

In 2005, Kim was appointed a public relations ambassador by the South Korea Olympic Committee's unsuccessful bid to host the 2014 Olympics. In 2010, she was one of 24 Korean athletes chosen to a committee to promote their bid for the 2018 Olympics. She was later credited with helping Korea win the bid. In October 2011, Kim was appointed a member of the 2018 Pyeongchang Olympic Winter Games Organising Committee and was named an official ambassador for the 2018 Olympics. She appeared as the final torch bearer and lit the Olympic flame in the Opening Ceremony. In February 2022, she was named the honorary ambassador for the 2024 Winter Youth Olympics in Gangwon, South Korea. She was also appointed a member of the Organising Committee.

=== Media image ===
Kim has been active in a variety of fields, including music, television, and fashion. In 2021, it was reported that due to her sponsorships, she was one of highest-paid athletes in South Korea, well into her retirement. In early 2023, when she donated 127 million Korean won (US $100,000) to aid earthquake recovery efforts in Turkey and Syria, Kim's "history of philanthropy" was reported. In 2010, she was named as a goodwill ambassador for UNICEF.

== Awards and honours ==
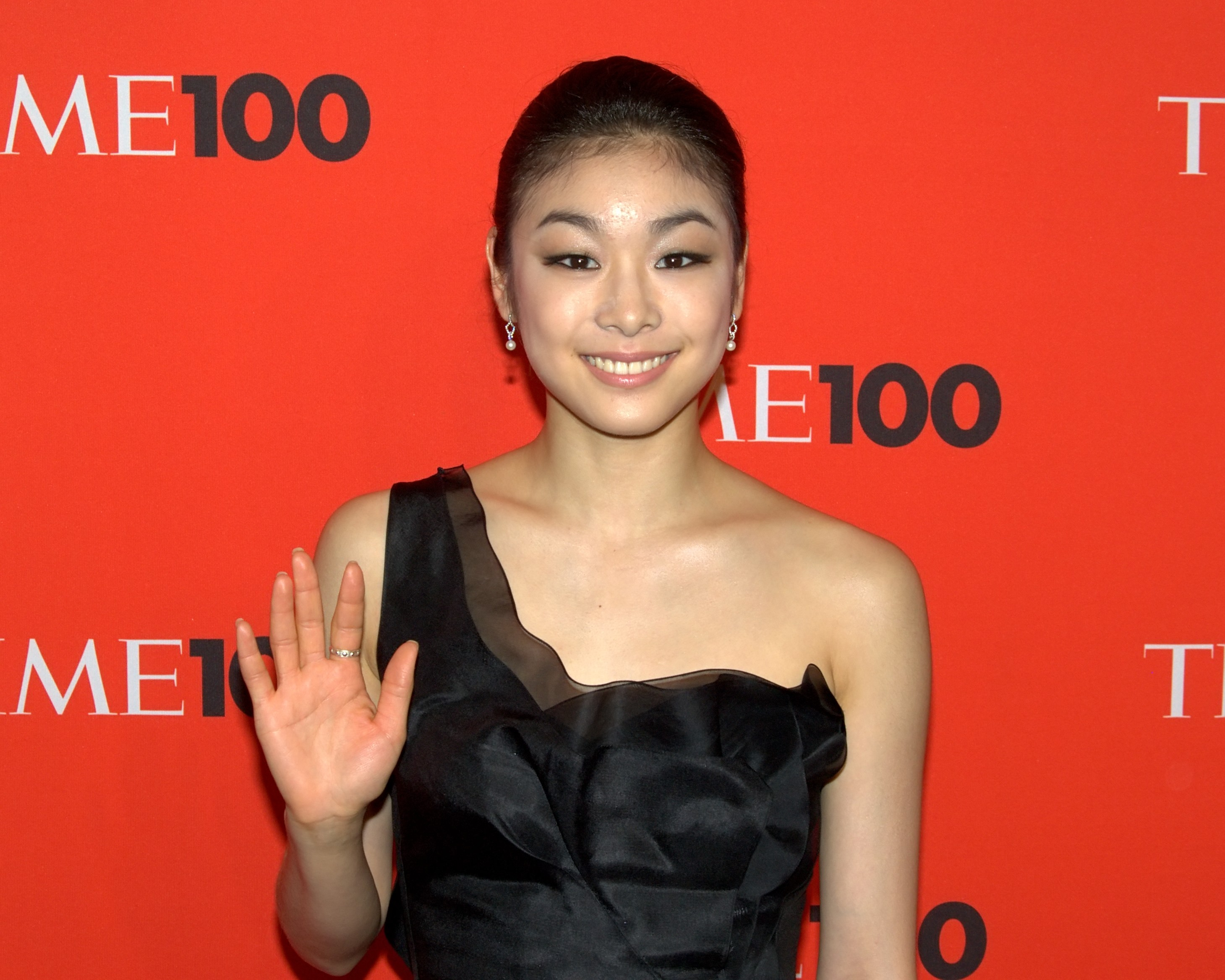
Kim at the 2010 Time 100 Gala

Kim has received many awards and honours during her career and afterwards in South Korea and from around the world. In 2008 and 2009, a major Korean newspaper named her Korea's "person of the year" and Gallup polls named her South Korea's top athlete in the three years preceding the 2010 Olympics. In August 2010, the city of Los Angeles designated August 7 as "Yu-Na Kim Day" and granted her honorary citizenship. She has been featured in various lists, including the Time 100 (2010) and several Forbes lists (2016).

== Personal life and education ==
Kim went to Dojang Middle School, though she stopped attending classes after joining the national team, and later Suri High School in Gunpo. As of 2009, she had applied as a physical education major and was a graduate of Korea University (KU) in 2013. In 2014, she applied to the university's graduate program in physical education, after taking a break to compete at the Sochi Games. She was initially attracted to KU because she wanted to attend a college that would understand and accommodate her needs as an athlete, which included taking a year off to compete in the Olympics, and because of their sports facilities, which included an ice rink.

Kim, along with her mother, became a Roman Catholic in 2008 after they came in contact with local nuns and Catholic organizations through her attending physician at a sport clinic in Seoul, a devout Catholic who was treating her for knee injuries. Her confirmation name is Stella from Stella Maris in Latin, meaning Our Lady, Star of the Sea, an ancient title of The Blessed Virgin Mary. In 2014, National Catholic Register called her "an example of how to live the faith publicly" and reported that she would pray while on the ice during the Vancouver Olympics and other competitions, when she would make the sign of the cross and when she bowed her head before competing. In 2010, she joined with the Korean bishops in a national campaign that explained the Rosary to the public; she wore a rosary ring, which many fans mistook for an engagement ring. She also made charitable donations and volunteered at Catholic hospitals, universities, and organizations.

By 2020, Kim was "very protective" about her private life, making infrequent posts on Instagram and no Twitter posts since 2018. On July 25, 2022, it was confirmed that Kim would marry singer Ko Woo-rim of Forestella, with whom she had been in a relationship for three years. They had met at the 2018 All That Skate show, where Forestella performed. They married in a private ceremony on October 22, 2022, at Hotel Shilla in Seoul.

== Records and achievements ==
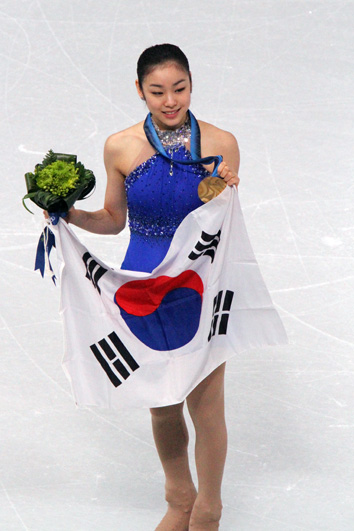
Kim after winning the gold medal at the 2010 Winter Olympics

- Former world record holder for the women's combined total score, short program score and free skate score.
- First Korean female skater to win an international event (Triglav Trophy, Slovenia, 2002).
- First Korean female skater to win a Junior Grand Prix event (Budapest, 2004).
- First Korean skater to place at and win a Junior Grand Prix Final (2005, 2006).
- First Korean skater to place at and win a Junior World Championships (2005, 2006).
- First Korean skater to place at and win a Senior Grand Prix event (2006 Skate Canada, 2006 Trophée Eric Bombard).
- First Korean skater to place at and win a Senior Grand Prix Final (2006).
- First female figure skater to have never finished off the podium in her entire career (as of 2014).
- Youngest skater to win back-to-back Grand Prix Finals (2006, 2007).
- First Korean skater to place at a World Championship (2007).
- First Korean skater to place at and win the Winter Olympics (2010).
- First female skater to win the Grand Prix Final, Four Continents Championships, World Championships, and Winter Olympic Games.
- First figure skater to win all major ISU championship titles including the Junior Grand Prix Final, World Junior Championships, Grand Prix Final, Four Continents Championships, World Championships, and Winter Olympic Games.
- First female skater, under the International Judging System, to break the 200-point and 220-point mark in the women's combined total in international competition (2009 World Championships, 2010 Winter Olympics).
- First female skater to break the 150-point mark in the women's free skate total in international competition (2010 Winter Olympics).

=== World record scores ===
Kim has broken world records 13 times in her career in the +3/-3 GOE System, including two historical junior records.

- J – Junior world record

Chronological list of world record scores in the +3/-3 GOE System
Date	Score	Segment	Event	Notes
Sep 4, 2004	101.32	Free skating (J)	2004 JGP Budapest	The record was broken by Mao Asada on December 5, 2004.
Mar 11, 2006	60.86	Short program (J)	2006 World Junior Championships	The record was broken by Caroline Zhang on March 1, 2008.
Mar 23, 2007	71.95	Short program	2007 World Championships	
Nov 24, 2007	133.70	Free skating	2007 Cup of Russia	
Feb 4, 2009	72.24	Short program	2009 Four Continents Championships	
Mar 27, 2009	76.12	Short program	2009 World Championships	
Mar 28, 2009	207.71	Combined total	2009 World Championships	Kim became the first woman to score above 200 points.
Oct 17, 2009	133.95	Free skating	2009 Trophée Éric Bompard	
Oct 17, 2009	210.03	Combined total	2009 Trophée Éric Bompard	
Nov 14, 2009	76.28	Short program	2009 Skate America	
Feb 23, 2010	78.50	Short program	2010 Winter Olympics	The record was broken by Mao Asada on March 27, 2014.
Feb 25, 2010	150.06	Free skating	2010 Winter Olympics	Kim became the first woman to score above 150 points in free skating. The record was broken by Evgenia Medvedeva on April 2, 2016.
Feb 25, 2010	228.56	Combined total	2010 Winter Olympics	Kim became the first woman to score above 220 points. The record was broken by Evgenia Medvedeva on January 27, 2017.

== Programs ==
=== Programs as a competitive skater ===
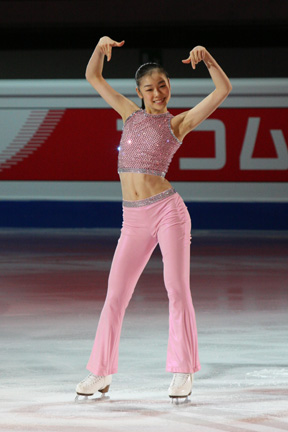
Kim performing her exhibition program to No Doubt's "Just a Girl" at the 2007 Grand Prix Final

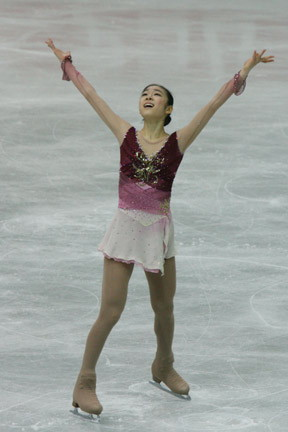
Kim performing to Miss Saigon at the 2008 World Figure Skating Championships

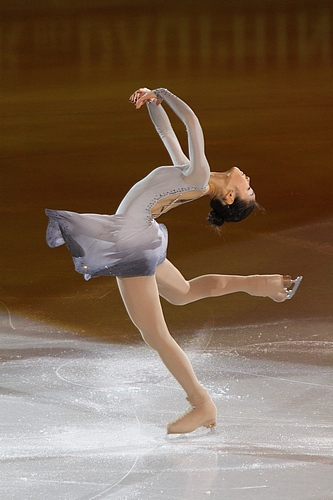
Kim performing to "Méditation" from Thaïs at the 2010 World Championships

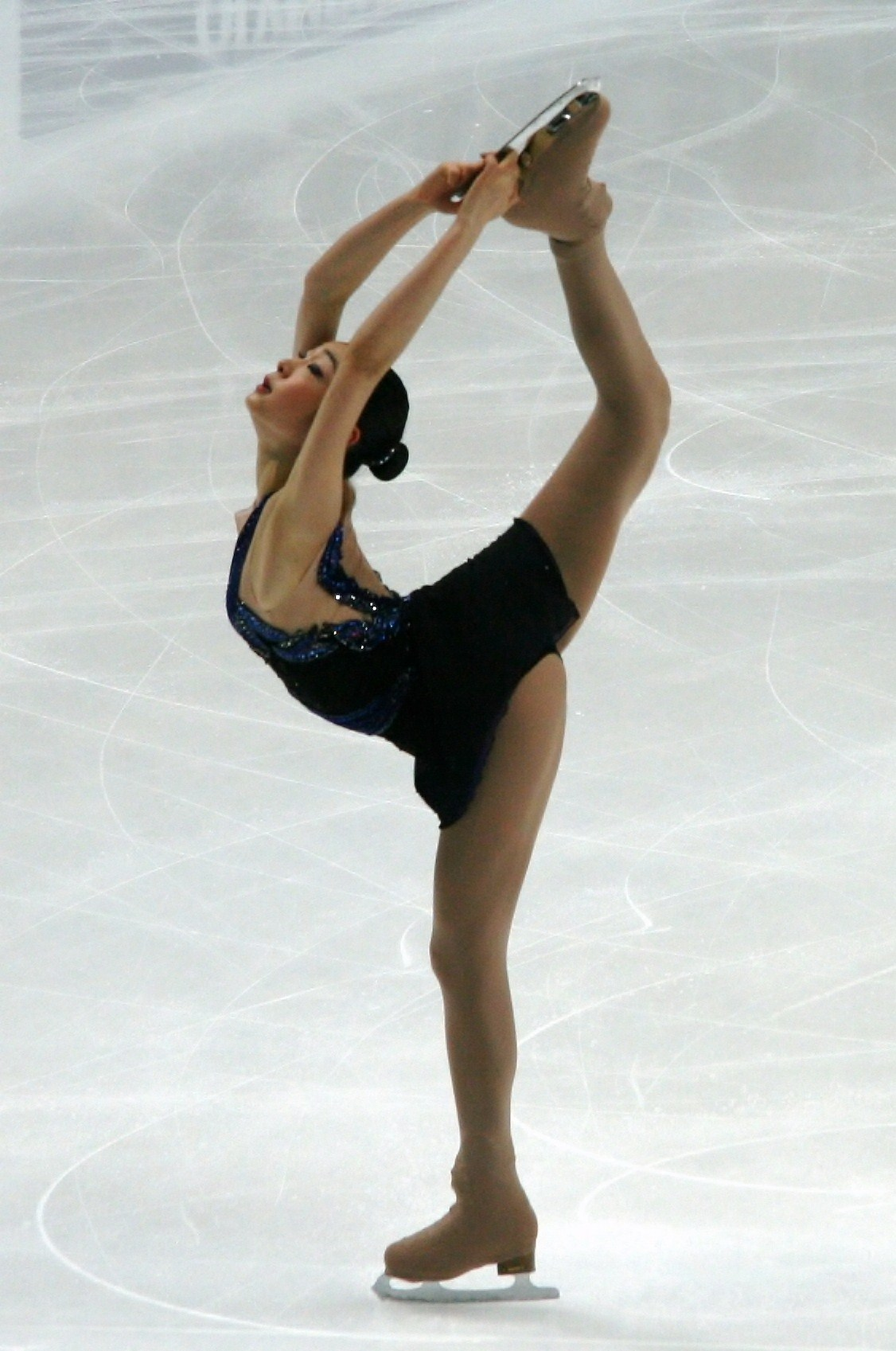
Kim performing to Giselle at the 2011 World Championships

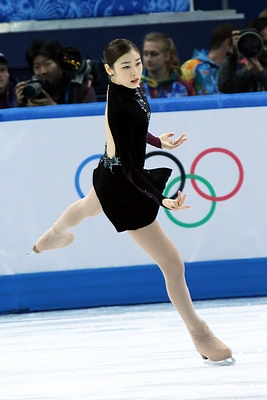
Kim performing to Adiós Nonino at the 2014 Winter Olympics

- Program details mentioned at first occurrence
- Olympic seasons highlighted in blue
- Programs performed at the Winter Olympics highlighted in **bold**

Competition and exhibition programs by season
Season	Short program	Free skate program	Exhibition program
2001–02	Can-can: From Orphée aux enfers; Composed by Jacques Offenbach; Choreo. by Catarina Lindgren	The Carnival of the Animals: Composed by Camille Saint-Saëns; Choreo. by Garnet	—N/a
2002–03	Can-can	Carmen Fantasy: Composed by Pablo de Sarasate; Choreo. by Catarina Lindgren	—N/a
2003–04	"Snowstorm": Composed by Georgy Sviridov; Choreo. by Catarina Lindgren	Carmen Fantasy	—N/a
2004–05	"Snowstorm"	"Papa, Can You Hear Me?": From Yentl; Composed by Michel Legrand; Choreo. by Jeffrey Buttle, Jadene Fullen	"Ben": Performed by Michael Jackson; Choreo. by Chi Hyun-jung, Yuna Kim
2005–06	"El Tango de Roxanne": From Moulin Rouge!; Composed by Sting, Mariano Mores; Performed by José Feliciano, Ewan McGregor, Jacek Koman; Choreo. by Tom Dickson	"Papa, Can You Hear Me?"	"One Day I'll Fly Away": From Moulin Rouge!; Composed by Will Jennings, Joe Sample; Performed by Nicole Kidman; Choreo. by Kim Se-yol, Yuna Kim
2006–07	"El Tango de Roxanne"	The Lark Ascending: Composed by Ralph Vaughan Williams; Choreo. by David Wilson	"Reflection": From Mulan; Performed by Christina Aguilera; Choreo. by Brian Orser
2007–08	Die Fledermaus: Composed by Johann Strauss II; Choreo. by David Wilson	Miss Saigon: Composed by Claude-Michel Schönberg; Choreo. by David Wilson	"Only Hope": From A Walk to Remember; Performed by Mandy Moore; Choreo. by David Wilson
2007–08	Die Fledermaus: Composed by Johann Strauss II; Choreo. by David Wilson	Miss Saigon: Composed by Claude-Michel Schönberg; Choreo. by David Wilson	"Once Upon a Dream": From Jekyll & Hyde; Performed by Linda Eder; Choreo. by David Wilson
2007–08	Die Fledermaus: Composed by Johann Strauss II; Choreo. by David Wilson	Miss Saigon: Composed by Claude-Michel Schönberg; Choreo. by David Wilson	"Just a Girl": Performed by No Doubt; Choreo. by David Wilson
2008–09	Danse macabre: Composed by Camille Saint-Saëns; Choreo. by David Wilson	Scheherazade: Composed by Nikolai Rimsky-Korsakov; Choreo. by David Wilson	"Only Hope"
2008–09	Danse macabre: Composed by Camille Saint-Saëns; Choreo. by David Wilson	Scheherazade: Composed by Nikolai Rimsky-Korsakov; Choreo. by David Wilson	"Gold": From Camille Claudel; Performed by Linda Eder; Choreo. by David Wilson
2009–10	**James Bond**: Composed by John Barry, David Arnold, Monty Norman; Choreo. by David Wilson	**Concerto in F**: Composed by George Gershwin; Choreo. by David Wilson	"**Méditation**": From Thaïs; Composed by Jules Massenet; Choreo. by David Wilson
2009–10	**James Bond**: Composed by John Barry, David Arnold, Monty Norman; Choreo. by David Wilson	**Concerto in F**: Composed by George Gershwin; Choreo. by David Wilson	"Don't Stop the Music": Performed by Rihanna; Choreo. by Sandra Bezic
2010–11	Giselle: Composed by Adolphe Adam; Choreo. by David Wilson	Homage to Korea (incl. "Arirang", 아리랑): Choreo. by David Wilson	"Bulletproof": Performed by La Roux; Choreo. by David Wilson
2011–12	—N/a	—N/a	"Fever": Performed by Beyoncé; Choreo. by David Wilson
2012–13	Kiss of the Vampire: Composed by James Bernard; Choreo. by David Wilson	Les Misérables: Composed by Claude-Michel Schönberg; Choreo. by David Wilson	"El Tango de Roxanne"
2012–13	Kiss of the Vampire: Composed by James Bernard; Choreo. by David Wilson	Les Misérables: Composed by Claude-Michel Schönberg; Choreo. by David Wilson	"Someone like You": Performed by Adele; Choreo. by David Wilson
2013–14	"**Send In the Clowns**": From A Little Night Music; Composed by Stephen Sondheim; Choreo. by David Wilson	**Adiós Nonino**: Composed by Astor Piazzolla; Performed by Lisandro Adrover; Choreo. by David Wilson	"Nessun dorma": From Turandot; Composed by Giacomo Puccini; Choreo. by David Wilson
2013–14	"**Send In the Clowns**": From A Little Night Music; Composed by Stephen Sondheim; Choreo. by David Wilson	**Adiós Nonino**: Composed by Astor Piazzolla; Performed by Lisandro Adrover; Choreo. by David Wilson	"**Imagine**": Composed by John Lennon; Performed by Avril Lavigne; Choreo. by David Wilson

=== Programs as a professional skater ===
Show programs as a professional skater by year
Year	Program	Event
2014	"Send In the Clowns"	All That Skate
2014	"Nessun Dorma"	All That Skate
2018	"House of Woodcock": Composed by Jonny Greenwood; Choreo. by David Wilson	All That Skate
2018	"House of Woodcock"	Revolution on Ice
2018	Charlie Chaplin medley: Performed live with Javier Fernández; Choreo. by Sandra Bezic, David Wilson	Revolution on Ice
2019	Variations on "Dark Eyes": Performed by Lara St. John, Ilan Rechtman; Choreo. by Sandra Bezic, David Wilson	All That Skate
2019	"Issues": Performed by Julia Michaels; Choreo. by Sandra Bezic, David Wilson	All That Skate

== Competitive highlights ==
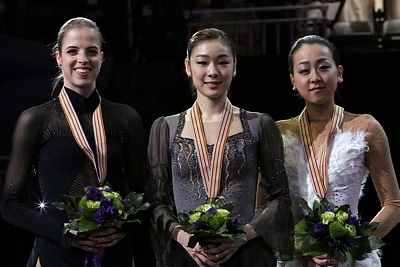
Kim on the podium with Carolina Kostner (left) and Mao Asada (right) at the 2013 World Championships

- GP – Event of the ISU Grand Prix Series
- JGP – Event of the ISU Junior Grand Prix Series

Competition placements at senior level
Season	2006–07	2007–08	2008–09	2009–10	2010–11	2012–13	2013–14
Winter Olympics				1st			2nd
World Championships	3rd	3rd	1st	2nd	2nd	1st	
Four Continents Championships			1st				
Grand Prix Final	1st	1st	2nd	1st			
South Korean Championships						1st	1st
GP Cup of China		1st	1st				
GP Cup of Russia		1st					
GP Skate America			1st	1st			
GP Skate Canada	3rd						
GP Trophée Éric Bompard	1st			1st			
Golden Spin of Zagreb							1st
NRW Trophy						1st	

Competition placements at junior level
Season	2001–02	2002–03	2003–04	2004–05	2005–06
World Junior Championships				2nd	1st
Junior Grand Prix Final				2nd	1st
South Korean Championships	1st J	1st S	1st S	1st S	1st S
JGP Bulgaria					1st
JGP China				2nd	
JGP Hungary				1st	
JGP Slovakia					1st

== Detailed results ==
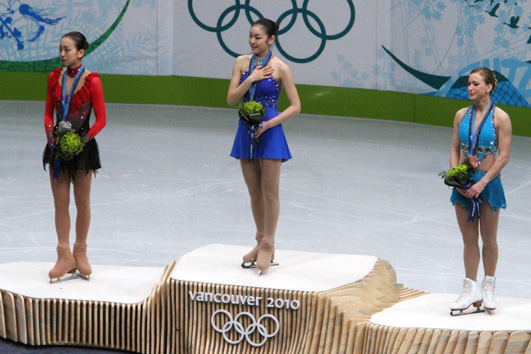
The women's podium at the 2010 Winter Olympics From left: Mao Asada (2nd), Yuna Kim (1st), and Joannie Rochette

ISU personal best scores in the +3/-3 GOE System
Segment	Type	Score	Event
Total	TSS	228.56	2010 Winter Olympics
Short program	TSS	78.50	2010 Winter Olympics
Short program	TES	44.70	2010 Winter Olympics
Short program	PCS	35.89	2014 Winter Olympics
Free skating	TSS	150.06	2010 Winter Olympics
Free skating	TES	78.30	2010 Winter Olympics
Free skating	PCS	74.50	2014 Winter Olympics

=== Senior level ===
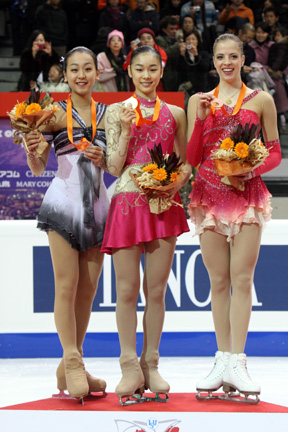
The women's podium at the 2007–08 Grand Prix of Figure Skating Final From left: Mao Asada (2nd), Yuna Kim (1st), and Carolina Kostner (3rd)

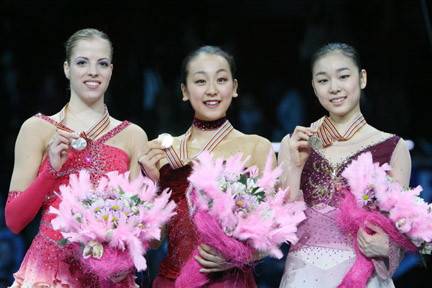
The women's podium at the 2008 World Figure Skating Championships From left: Carolina Kostner (2nd), Mao Asada (1st), and Yuna Kim (3rd)

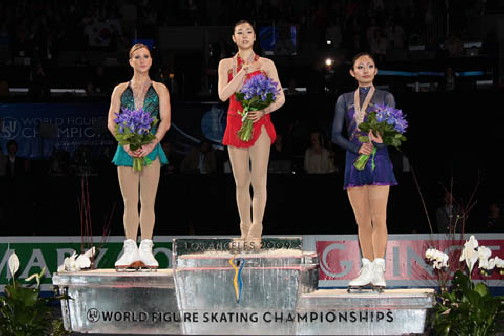
The women's podium at the 2009 World Figure Skating Championships From left: Joannie Rochette (2nd), Yuna Kim (1st), and Miki Ando (3rd)

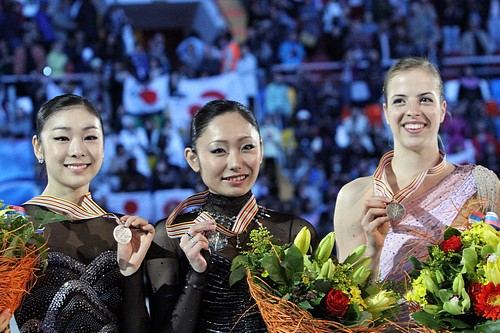
The women's podium at the 2011 World Figure Skating Championships From left: Yuna Kim (2nd), Miki Ando (1st), and Carolina Kostner (3rd)

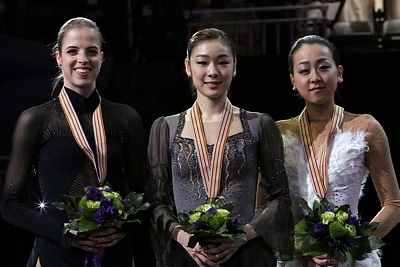
The women's podium at the 2013 World Figure Skating Championships From left: Carolina Kostner (2nd), Yuna Kim (1st), and Mao Asada (3rd)

- Small medals for the short program and free skating are only awarded at ISU Championships.

Results in the 2006–07 season
Date	Event	SP		FS		Total	
Date	Event	P	Score	P	Score	P	Score
Nov 2–5, 2006	2006 Skate Canada International	1	62.68	4	105.80	3	168.48
Nov 16–19, 2006	(France) 2006 Trophée Éric Bompard	1	65.22	1	119.32	1	184.54
Dec 14–17, 2006	(Russia) 2006–07 Grand Prix Final	3	65.06	1	119.14	1	184.20
Mar 19–25, 2007	(Japan) 2007 World Championships	1	71.95	4	114.19	3	186.14

Results in the 2007–08 season
Date	Event	SP		FS		Total	
Date	Event	P	Score	P	Score	P	Score
Nov 8–11, 2007	2007 Cup of China	3	58.32	1	122.36	1	180.68
Nov 22–25, 2007	2007 Cup of Russia	1	63.50	1	133.70	1	197.20
Dec 13–16, 2007	(Italy) 2007–08 Grand Prix Final	1	64.62	2	132.21	1	196.83
Mar 17–23, 2008	(Sweden) 2008 World Championships	5	59.85	1	123.38	3	183.23

Results in the 2008–09 season
Date	Event	SP		FS		Total	
Date	Event	P	Score	P	Score	P	Score
Oct 23–26, 2008	(United States) 2008 Skate America	1	69.50	1	123.95	1	193.45
Nov 6–9, 2008	2008 Cup of China	1	63.64	1	128.11	1	191.75
Dec 10–14, 2008	(South Korea) 2008–09 Grand Prix Final	1	65.94	2	120.41	2	186.35
Feb 2–8, 2009	(Canada) 2009 Four Continents Championships	1	72.24	3	116.83	1	189.07
Mar 23–29, 2009	(United States) 2009 World Championships	1	76.12	1	131.59	1	207.71

Results in the 2009–10 season
Date	Event	SP		FS		Total	
Date	Event	P	Score	P	Score	P	Score
Oct 15–18, 2009	(France) 2009 Trophée Éric Bompard	1	76.08	1	133.95	1	210.03
Nov 12–15, 2009	(United States) 2009 Skate America	1	76.28	2	111.70	1	187.98
Dec 3–6, 2009	(Japan) 2009–10 Grand Prix Final	2	65.64	1	123.22	1	188.86
Feb 14–27, 2010	(Canada) 2010 Winter Olympics	1	78.50	1	150.06	1	228.56
Mar 22–28, 2010	(Italy) 2010 World Championships	7	60.30	1	130.49	2	190.79

Results in the 2010–11 season
Date	Event	SP		FS		Total	
Date	Event	P	Score	P	Score	P	Score
Apr 24 – May 1, 2011	(Russia) 2011 World Championships	1	65.91	2	128.59	2	194.50

Results in the 2012–13 season
Date	Event	SP		FS		Total	
Date	Event	P	Score	P	Score	P	Score
Dec 5–9, 2012	(Germany) 2012 NRW Trophy	1	72.27	1	129.34	1	201.61
Jan 2–6, 2013	(South Korea) 2013 South Korean Championships	1	64.97	1	145.80	1	210.77
Mar 10–17, 2013	(Canada) 2013 World Championships	1	69.97	1	148.34	1	218.31

Results in the 2013–14 season
Date	Event	SP		FS		Total	
Date	Event	P	Score	P	Score	P	Score
Dec 5–8, 2013	(Croatia) 2013 Golden Spin of Zagreb	1	73.37	1	131.12	1	204.49
Jan 1–5, 2014	(South Korea) 2014 South Korean Championships	1	80.60	1	147.26	1	227.86
Feb 6–22, 2014	(Russia) 2014 Winter Olympics	1	74.92	2	144.19	2	219.11

=== Junior level ===
- Results of qualification rounds are listed in brackets below the results of the main event in the respective competition segment.
- The 2005 South Korean Championships were judged in the old 6.0 system, recording only placements.

Results in the 2004–05 season
Date	Event	SP		FS		Total	
Date	Event	P	Score	P	Score	P	Score
Sep 1–5, 2004	2004 JGP Hungary	1	47.23	1	101.32	1	148.55
Sep 16–19, 2004	2004 JGP China	4	38.87	1	92.35	2	131.22
Dec 2–5, 2004	(Finland) 2004–05 Junior Grand Prix Final	2	51.27	3	86.48	2	137.75
Jan 1–4, 2005	(South Korea) 2005 South Korean Championships (Senior)	1	–	1	–	1	–
Feb 28 – Mar 6, 2005	(Canada) 2005 World Junior Championships	6	48.67	2 (1)	110.26 (102.98)	2	158.93

Results in the 2005–06 season
Date	Event	SP		FS		Total	
Date	Event	P	Score	P	Score	P	Score
Sep 1–4, 2005	2005 JGP Slovakia	1	58.63	1	110.20	1	168.83
Sep 29 – Oct 2, 2005	2005 JGP Bulgaria	1	53.45	1	99.98	1	153.43
Nov 24–27, 2005	(Czech Republic) 2005–06 Junior Grand Prix Final	1	57.51	1	116.61	1	174.12
Jan 5–8, 2006	(South Korea) 2006 South Korean Championships (Senior)	1	61.44	1	104.08	1	165.52
Mar 6–12, 2006	(Slovenia) 2006 World Junior Championships	1	60.86	1 (1)	116.68 (107.52)	1	177.54

Olympic Games
Preceded by (Brazil) Vanderlei Cordeiro de Lima	Final Olympic torchbearer PyeongChang 2018	Succeeded by (Japan) Naomi Osaka
Preceded by (Russia) Vladislav Tretiak and Irina Rodnina	Final Winter Olympic torchbearer PyeongChang 2018	Succeeded by (China) Dinigeer Yilamujiang and Zhao Jiawen
