= Concerto in F (Gershwin) =

Composition by George Gershwin

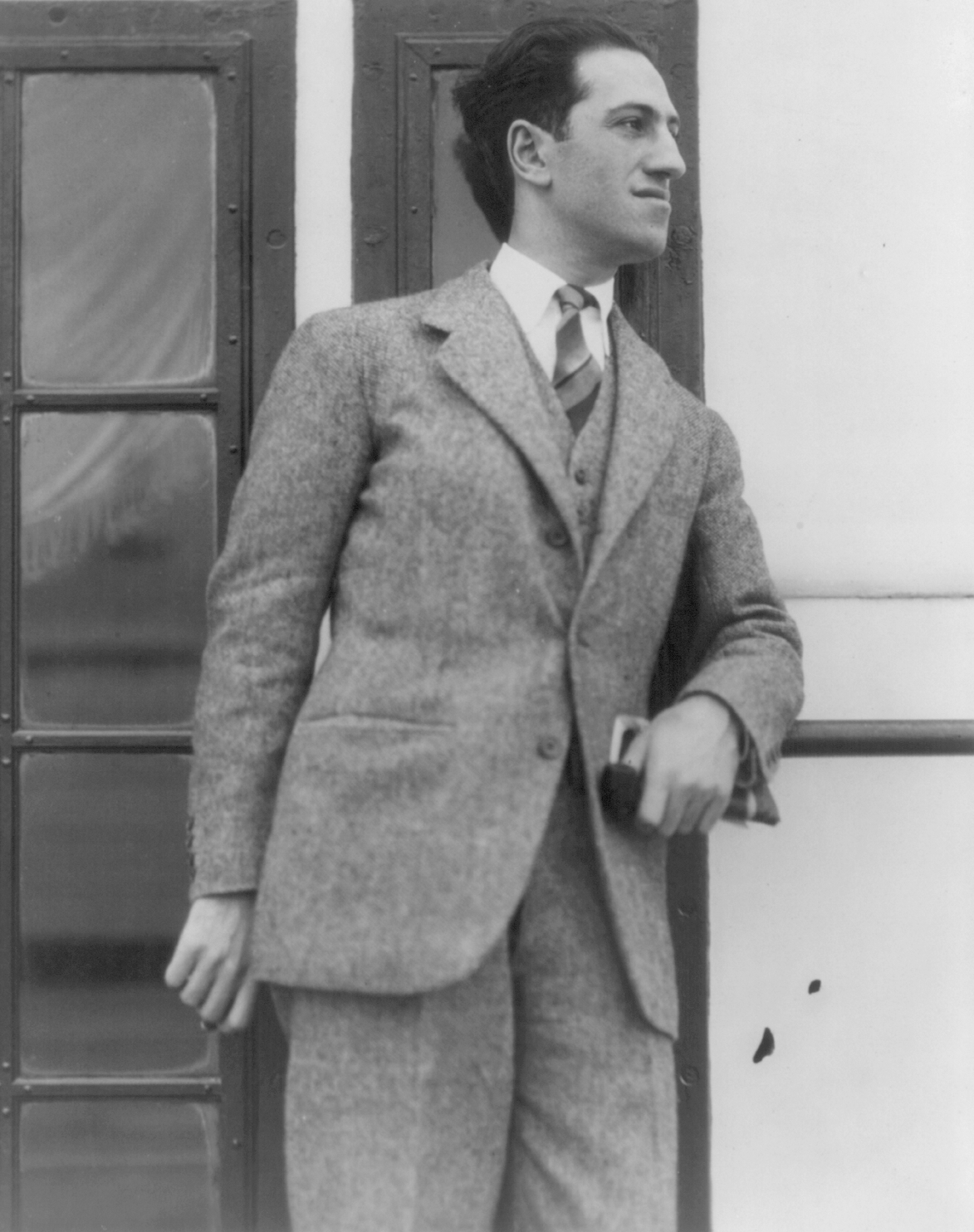
George Gershwin c. 1920s

Concerto in F is a composition by George Gershwin for solo piano and orchestra which is closer in form to a traditional concerto than his earlier jazz-influenced Rhapsody in Blue. It was written in 1925 on a commission from the conductor and director Walter Damrosch. A full performance lasts around half an hour.

== Genesis of the concerto ==
Damrosch had been present at the February 12, 1924, concert arranged and conducted by Paul Whiteman at Aeolian Hall in New York City titled An Experiment in Modern Music which became famous for the premiere of Gershwin's Rhapsody in Blue, in which the composer performed the piano solo. The day after the concert, Damrosch contacted Gershwin to commission from him a full-scale piano concerto for the New York Symphony Orchestra, closer in form to a classical concerto and orchestrated by the composer.

Because of contractual obligations for three different Broadway musicals, he was not able to begin sketching ideas until May 1925. He began the two-piano score on July 22, after returning from a trip to London, and the original drafts were entitled "New York Concerto". The first movement was written in July, the second in August, and the third in September, much of the work being done in a practice shack at the Chautauqua Institution. This had been arranged through the Australian composer and teacher Ernest Hutcheson, who offered seclusion for Gershwin at Chautauqua, where his quarters were declared off limits to everyone until 4 p.m. daily. Thanks to this, Gershwin was able to complete the full orchestration of the concerto on November 10, 1925. Later that month, Gershwin hired a 55-piece orchestra, at his own expense, to run through his first draft at the Globe Theatre. Damrosch attended and gave advice to Gershwin, who made a few cuts and revisions.

According to a newspaper reporter in attendance, the pipe "wandered in and out of his mouth all through the rehearsal. In particular, he used it to point accusingly at members of the orchestra who were not solving their jazz problems successfully."

The Concerto in F shows considerable development in Gershwin's compositional technique, particularly because he orchestrated the entire work himself, unlike the Rhapsody in Blue which was scored by Ferde Grofé, Paul Whiteman's section pianist and principal orchestrator. The English composer and orchestrator William Walton commented that he adored Gershwin's orchestration of the concerto.

== Instrumentation ==
In addition to the solo piano, the work calls for 2 flutes, piccolo, 2 oboes, English horn, 2 clarinets in B♭, bass clarinet, 2 bassoons, 4 horns in F, 3 trumpets in B♭, 3 trombones, tuba, timpani, 3 percussionists (first player: bass drum, glockenspiel, xylophone and triangle; second player: snare drum, woodblock, whip; third player: cymbals, (crash & suspended), triangle and gong), and strings.

== Form ==
The concerto is in the traditional three movements:

1. Allegro (F major)
2. Adagio – Andante con moto (D♭ major)
3. Allegro agitato (G minor → F minor → F major)

There are strong thematic links among the three movements, all of which are heavily influenced by jazz. However, there exists, in each movement, a very subtle structural integrity that, while perhaps not immediately apparent to the listener, is rooted in the classical tradition.

The first movement begins with blasts from the timpani, introducing elements of the main thematic material. After an extended orchestral introduction, the piano enters with a solo section, introducing another melody found throughout the movement. From here, the music alternates with contrasting sections of grandiosity and delicacy. The climax is reached at the Grandioso, in which the orchestra resounds the piano's original melody, accompanied by a large triplet figure in the soloist. There is a cadenza of quick triplet ostinatos which leads to the final section: speeding octaves and chords, culminating in a large run of the triplet ostinato up the keyboard along an F Major 6 chord, bringing the movement to a close.

The second movement is reminiscent of the blues - beginning with an elegant melody in a solo trumpet accompanied by a trio of clarinets. A faster section featuring the piano follows, building gradually until near the end, at which point the piece deceptively pulls back to the original melody, now given to the flute. The movement ends in a peaceful, introspective cadence.

The final movement is pulsating and energetic with several references to ragtime, featuring both new material and melodies from the previous movements. A false climax is found in a Grandioso section identical to that of the first movement, which in turn evolves into another build to the true pinnacle of the concerto, again dominated by the F Major 6 chord, bringing the piece to a close.

In his own words Gershwin wrote a description of the concerto:

The first movement employs the Charleston rhythm. It is quick and pulsating, representing the young enthusiastic spirit of American life. It begins with a rhythmic motif given out by the kettle drums…. The principal theme is announced by the bassoon. Later, a second theme is introduced by the piano. The second movement has a poetic, nocturnal atmosphere which has come to be referred to as the American blues, but in a purer form than that in which they are usually treated. The final movement reverts to the style of the first. It is an orgy of rhythms, starting violently and keeping to the same pace throughout.

=== I. Allegro ===
The first movement weaves together three rhythms and themes: Charleston, pentatonic runs and sultry. The timpani begins the movement with wham-bok beats, then the orchestra introduces a pentatonic melody accompanied by the Charleston in the horns and percussion. Thirty seconds in, the timpani and orchestra alternate wham-bok beats with the pentatonic melody. After the strings lull, the piano introduces the main sultry theme used throughout the piece. It is repeated again with an orchestral counter-melody played by the cellos and strings at the same time, followed by pentatonic runs in the piano and continuing accompaniment in the orchestra. It climaxes to a chromatic scale run in the piano and resolves with Spanish-sounding syncopation in the orchestra. Piano Charleston syncopation reintroduces the sultry theme heard at the beginning of the piece. This time the piano plays the counter-melody while the orchestra plays the sultry theme. A "micro-cadenza" of arpeggios in the piano bridges the sultry in the orchestra with another variation of Charleston accompaniment and pentatonic melody. Gershwin plays with this variant of the sultry in E major as he leads the listener to a climax of the piece. After the climax, Gershwin combines Charleston, pentatonic melody and fast-paced triplets to modulate from one key to another before reintroducing another sultry variation in D-Flat major. Charleston rhythms transition from the sultry to the "Grandioso" climax followed by triplet ostinatos, fast-paced chords, more ostinatos and a C dominant 7 scale. A coda ends the last two minutes with Charleston and sultry in the orchestra and pentatonic lines in the piano before finally ending the movement with an F Major 6 chord.

=== II. Adagio – Andante con moto ===
In the second movement, Gershwin uses two blues themes, similar to the theme from the first movement and foreshadows the theme of the third movement in a faster theme played between the two blues melodies. A blues chord progression opens the movement, and a solo trumpet plays the first blues theme. The theme is introduced by alternating major seconds in the French horns, then a trumpet solo. By the first minute, the trumpet solo sounds very similar to the sultry theme heard in the first movement. Gershwin continues with improvised and variant themes of the blues melody. The trumpet then repeats the theme played at the beginning. When the trumpet solo ends, the piano enters with a pentatonic variant of the first theme before transitioning into a faster, upbeat second theme. This theme foreshadows the melody of the third movement- through repeated notes. This theme is also a variant of the one heard in the first movement. A violin solo bridges this theme and reintroduces the first theme played at the beginning. The piano then takes over with another variation in a cadenza of both the theme and accompanying arpeggios. After the cadenza, Gershwin passes the original theme to the orchestra, then back to the piano and a flute. He then builds to the climax of the piece, alternating between the piano and the orchestra. The movement ends with the piano playing the theme from the beginning, soft flute and string accompaniment, and a D-Flat Major cadence.

=== III. Allegro agitato ===
The third movement is a fast-paced rondo and reintroduces the theme heard in the first movement, at a more vigorous tempo. The orchestra begins by playing the main theme of the movement in g minor and then the piano repeats the theme in f minor. As the piano continues to play the fast-paced notes, the orchestra plays a counter-melody. A glissando from the piano reintroduces the theme from the first movement played in the orchestra before transitioning back to the main theme. The orchestra then plays a second theme with soft piano accompaniment. Variants of the main and secondary themes return. After a modulation into B-Flat major, the orchestra plays the second blues theme heard in the second movement and the piano responds with the secondary theme. The rat-a-tat rhythm returns, bridging the blues theme and the repeated note melody from the second movement, played by the orchestra. The movement's secondary theme returns in the piano before playing a chord progression heard in the first movement. A series of fast-paced octave scales crescendo into the same "grandioso" heard in the first movement. The rat-a-tat theme returns for the final time in the movement; pentatonic chord progressions and a final F Major 6 tremolo and F major chord finish the piece.

== Release and reception ==
The work was premiered by the New York Symphony Orchestra with Damrosch conducting (three years later the orchestra would merge with the Philharmonic Symphony Society into the New York Philharmonic Orchestra) at Carnegie Hall in New York on December 3, 1925, and featured the composer as the soloist. The same forces presented several performances very soon after—two more in New York, and one each in Philadelphia, Baltimore, and Washington, preceding another at the Brooklyn Academy of Music on 16 January 1926. The concert was sold out and the concerto was very well received by the general public. However, the reviews were mixed, with many critics unable to classify it as jazz or classical. Indeed, there was a great variety of opinion among Gershwin's contemporaries. Sergei Prokofiev found it "amateurish". Arnold Schoenberg, one of the most influential composers at the time, praised Gershwin's concerto in a posthumous tribute in 1938:

Gershwin is an artist and a composer – he expressed musical ideas, and they were new, as is the way he expressed them. … An artist is to me like an apple tree. When the time comes, whether it wants to or not it bursts into bloom and starts to produce apples. … Serious or not, he is a composer, that is, a man who lives in music and expresses everything, serious or not, sound or superficial, by means of music, because it is his native language. … What he has done with rhythm, harmony and melody is not merely style. It is fundamentally different from the mannerism of many a serious composer [who writes] a superficial union of devices applied to a minimum of ideas. … The impression is of an improvisation with all the merits and shortcomings appertaining to this kind of production. … He only feels he has something to say and he says it.

Damrosch himself provided a note praising Gershwin's work:

Various composers have been walking around jazz like a cat around a plate of soup, waiting for it to cool off so that they could enjoy it without burning their tongues, hitherto accustomed only to the more tepid liquids distilled by cooks of the classical school. Lady Jazz . . . has danced her way around the world ... but for all her travels and sweeping popularity, she has encountered no knight who could lift her to a level that would enable her to be received as a respectable member of musical circles. George Gershwin seems to have accomplished this miracle ... boldly by dressing his extremely independent and up-to-date young lady in the classic garb of a concerto. ... He is the Prince who has taken Cinderella by the hand and openly proclaimed her a princess to the astonished world, no doubt to the fury of her envious sisters.

== Performance in film ==
A performance of the 3rd movement of the concerto is featured during a humorous fantasy sequence in the film An American in Paris (1951). In one of the film's many musical numbers, Oscar Levant's character Adam Cook, a struggling pianist, daydreams that he is performing the concerto for a gala audience in a concert hall. As the scene progresses, Adam fantasizes that he is also every other member of the orchestra, as well as the conductor, and even envisions that he is applauding himself from the audience at the concerto's conclusion.

There is also a performance of an excerpt in the Gershwin biopic Rhapsody in Blue (1945) where it is partially played onscreen by Robert Alda (dubbed by Oscar Levant), and then at the film's conclusion by Levant himself. It is heard at especially poignant moments, once when Gershwin stumbles over the notes because of the effects of his fatal brain tumor, and once more in the scene in which Gershwin's death is announced.

Levant's performance of the concerto in An American in Paris is noteworthy because Levant was himself an accomplished concert pianist and composer who had befriended Gershwin in 1928. A 2003 filming on DVD features the Marcus Roberts Trio with Seiji Ozawa conducting the Berliner Philharmoniker at Waldbühne, Berlin.

== Notable recordings ==
The first recording was made in 1928 by Paul Whiteman and his Concert Orchestra, with Roy Bargy at the piano, in an abridged arrangement for jazz band by Ferde Grofé, for Columbia Records. Others include:

- Oscar Levant and Andre Kostelanetz with the Philharmonic Symphony Orchestra of New York (May 4, 1942)
- Oscar Levant and Arturo Toscanini with the NBC Symphony Orchestra (from the 1944 NBC radio broadcast)
- Leonard Pennario and William Steinberg with the Pittsburgh Symphony from 1953 on Capitol. (During his life, Pennario was considered THE "go-to" interpreter of Gershwin's music. He recorded everything that Gershwin wrote for piano.)
- Stanislav Knor and Václav Neumann with the Prague Symphony Orchestra (June 1961)
- Alec Templeton and Thor Johnson with the Cincinnati Symphony Orchestra
- Earl Wild and Arthur Fiedler with the Boston Pops Orchestra
- Eugene List and Howard Hanson with the Eastman-Rochester Orchestra
- Lazar Berman and Gennady Rozhdestvensky with Moscow Philharmonic Orchestra
- André Previn and Andre Kostelanetz and his orchestra (Previn has made two further recordings, both conducting from the keyboard, with the London Symphony Orchestra and with the Pittsburgh Symphony)
- Garrick Ohlsson and Michael Tilson Thomas with the San Francisco Symphony
- Philippe Entremont and Eugene Ormandy with the Philadelphia Orchestra
- Hélène Grimaud and David Zinman with the Baltimore Symphony
- Werner Haas and Edo de Waart with Orchestre National de l'Opéra de Monte-Carlo
- Lorin Hollander and James Levine with the Chicago Symphony (1976)
- Jerome Lowenthal and Maurice Abravanel with the Utah Symphony
- Bonnie Gritton and Susan Duehlmeire (two-piano version)
- Jon Nakamatsu and Jeff Tyzik with the Rochester Philharmonic Orchestra.
- Katia and Marielle Labèque (two-piano version)
- Cristina Ortiz and André Previn with the London Symphony Orchestra
- Jean-Yves Thibaudet and Marin Alsop with the Baltimore Symphony (jazz band version orchestrated by Ferde Grofé)
- Peter Jablonski and Vladimir Ashkenazy with the Royal Philharmonic Orchestra, Decca - 1991
- Sviatoslav Richter and Christoph Eschenbach with the Stuttgart Radio Symphony Orchestra (live from the 1993 Schwetzingen Festival)
- Marc-André Hamelin and Leonard Slatkin with Netherlands Radio Philharmonic Orchestra (live from Concertgebouw, Amsterdam, 2005)
- Stefano Bollani and Riccardo Chailly with Leipzig Gewandhaus Orchestra (live from Gewandhaus, Leipzig, 2010)
- Jeffrey Siegel and Leonard Slatkin with the St. Louis Symphony (The Complete Gershwin: Works for Orchestra, Piano and Orchestra)
- Kathryn Selby and Richard Hayman with Slovak Radio Symphony Orchestra

== Radio broadcast ==
Although Gershwin never recorded the concerto, he was invited by Rudy Vallee to play the third movement from the concerto on an NBC radio broadcast in 1931, which was preserved on transcription discs and later issued on both LPs and compact discs. Vallee used a special arrangement prepared for his studio orchestra. Gershwin also played a few of his popular songs on the broadcast.

== Popular culture ==
Figure skater Yuna Kim of South Korea skated to a four-minute edited version of this piece at the 2010 Winter Olympics in Vancouver, as well as 2009 Trophée Éric Bompard, 2009 Skate America, and 2009–10 Grand Prix Final, winning the gold medal for ladies' figure skating and breaking the world record score for the women's long program. When she competed in the 2010 World Championships, she won the silver medal totaling 190.79 points.
