= 2009 Trophée Éric Bompard =

- Type: Grand Prix
- Date: October 15 – 18
- Season: 2009–10
- Location: Paris
- Host: Federation Française des Sports de Glace
- Venue: Palais Omnisports de Paris-Bercy

Champions
- Men's singles: (Japan) Nobunari Oda
- Ladies' singles: (South Korea) Kim Yuna
- Pairs: (Russia) Maria Mukhortova / Maxim Trankov
- Ice dance: (Canada) Tessa Virtue / Scott Moir
- Previous: 2008 Trophée Éric Bompard
- Next: 2010 Trophée Éric Bompard
- Previous GP: –
- Next GP: 2009 Rostelecom Cup

The 2009 Trophée Éric Bompard was the first event of six in the 2009–10 ISU Grand Prix of Figure Skating, a senior-level international invitational competition series. It was held at the Palais Omnisports de Paris-Bercy in Paris on October 15–18. Medals were awarded in the disciplines of men's singles, ladies' singles, pair skating, and ice dancing. Skaters earned points toward qualifying for the 2009–10 Grand Prix Final. The compulsory dance was the Golden Waltz.

== Results ==
=== Men ===
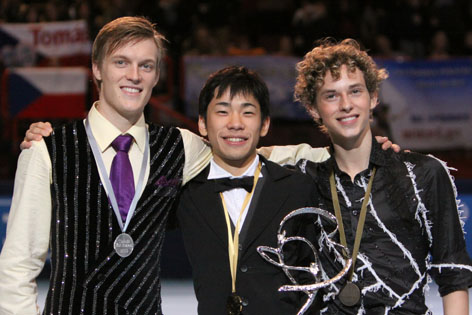
The men's podium

Rank	Name	Nation	Total points	SP		FS	
1	Nobunari Oda	Japan	242.53	2	79.20	1	163.33
2	Tomáš Verner	Czech Republic	229.96	1	81.00	2	148.96
3	Adam Rippon	United States	219.96	3	75.82	3	144.14
4	Brian Joubert	France	207.39	6	72.15	4	135.24
5	Yannick Ponsero	France	205.74	5	72.50	5	133.24
6	Sergei Voronov	Russia	204.45	4	72.80	6	131.65
7	Alban Préaubert	France	189.63	7	66.49	7	123.14
8	Yang Chao	China	178.63	9	60.72	8	117.91
9	Ryan Bradley	United States	177.65	8	65.21	10	112.44
10	Peter Liebers	Germany	176.52	11	60.31	9	116.21
11	Javier Fernández	Spain	170.16	10	60.56	11	109.60
12	Vaughn Chipeur	Canada	155.43	12	51.45	12	103.98

=== Ladies ===
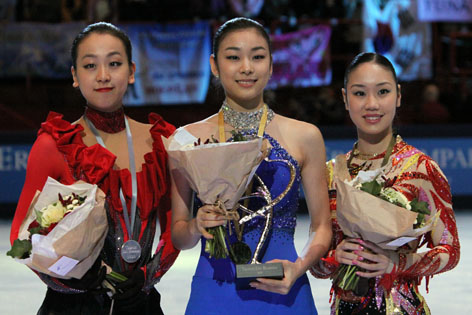
The ladies' podium

Kim Yuna set a new free skating world record of 133.95 and a new combined total world record of 210.03.

Rank	Name	Nation	Total points	SP		FS	
1	Kim Yuna	South Korea	210.03	1	76.08	1	133.95
2	Mao Asada	Japan	173.99	3	58.96	2	115.03
3	Yukari Nakano	Japan	165.70	2	59.64	3	106.06
4	Caroline Zhang	United States	153.15	5	57.26	5	95.89
5	Alexe Gilles	United States	151.92	4	58.22	7	93.70
6	Carolina Kostner	Italy	147.63	7	51.26	4	96.37
7	Elene Gedevanishvili	Georgia	143.43	8	48.68	6	94.75
8	Kiira Korpi	Finland	138.83	6	54.20	8	84.63
9	Gwendoline Didier	France	118.07	10	41.96	9	76.11
10	Anna Jurkiewicz	Poland	115.06	9	43.86	10	71.20

=== Pairs ===
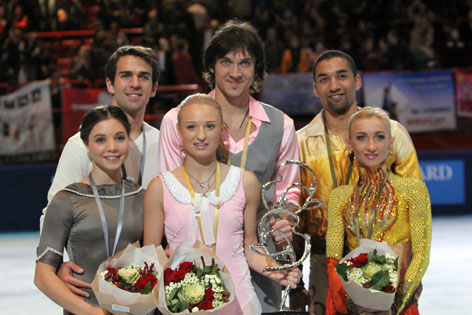
The pairs' podium

Rank	Name	Nation	Total points	SP		FS	
1	Maria Mukhortova / Maxim Trankov	Russia	192.93	2	66.88	1	126.05
2	Jessica Dubé / Bryce Davison	Canada	180.97	3	64.54	2	116.43
3	Aliona Savchenko / Robin Szolkowy	Germany	174.42	1	72.98	4	101.44
4	Rena Inoue / John Baldwin	United States	158.36	5	55.06	3	103.30
5	Adeline Canac / Maximin Coia	France	150.18	4	55.96	6	94.22
6	Dong Huibo / Wu Yiming	China	144.45	6	49.70	5	94.75
7	Marissa Castelli / Simon Shnapir	United States	133.01	7	49.50	7	83.51
8	Vanessa James / Yannick Bonheur	France	118.66	8	38.96	8	79.70

=== Ice dancing ===
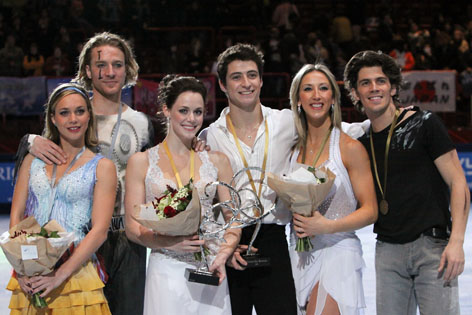
The ice dancing podium

Rank	Name	Nation	Total points	CD		OD		FD	
1	Tessa Virtue / Scott Moir	Canada	197.71	1	38.41	1	61.91	1	97.39
2	Nathalie Péchalat / Fabian Bourzat	France	181.64	3	35.53	2	56.34	2	89.77
3	Sinead Kerr / John Kerr	United Kingdom	177.11	2	36.13	3	54.73	3	86.25
4	Emily Samuelson / Evan Bates	United States	158.07	4	31.11	6	46.55	5	80.41
5	Ekaterina Rubleva / Ivan Shefer	Russia	155.54	8	27.12	5	47.12	4	81.30
6	Kimberly Navarro / Brent Bommentre	United States	150.29	6	29.19	4	48.17	7	72.93
7	Kristina Gorshkova / Vitali Butikov	Russia	145.96	5	29.56	7	45.58	8	70.82
8	Madison Hubbell / Keiffer Hubbell	United States	143.28	7	27.17	10	43.07	6	73.04
9	Pernelle Carron / Lloyd Jones	France	140.27	9	26.28	8	45.18	10	68.81
10	Zoé Blanc / Pierre-Loup Bouquet	France	138.12	10	24.08	9	44.24	9	69.80
