= Bids for the 2022 Winter Olympics =

Bids for the 2022 Winter Olympics and Paralympics
Overview
- XXIV Olympic Winter Games; XIII Paralympic Winter Games
- Winner: Beijing; Runner-up: Almaty

Details
- Committee: IOC
- Election venue: Kuala Lumpur; 127th IOC Session

Map of the bidding cities

Important dates
- Bid: 14 November 2013
- Shortlist: 7 July 2014
- Decision: July 31, 2015

Decision
- Winner: Beijing (44 votes)
- Runner-up: Almaty (40 votes)

A total of six bids were initially submitted for the 2022 Winter Olympics. Four of the bids were subsequently withdrawn by 1 October 2014, citing either the high costs of hosting the Games or the lack of local support, leaving Almaty, Kazakhstan and Beijing, China as the only two remaining candidate cities. Beijing was then elected as the host city at the 128th IOC Session in Kuala Lumpur, Malaysia, on 31 July 2015.

== Bidding calendar ==
On 3 October 2012, the IOC announced in a letter to the NOCs the bidding calendar for the 2022 Winter Olympics:

- 3 October 2012 – First information circular letter to NOCs
- 6 June 2013 – IOC officially invites bid applicants from NOCs and publishes the 2022 Applicant City Questionnaire
- 14 November 2013 – Deadline for NOCs to submit the name of an applicant city
- 4–6 December 2013 – Applicant city seminar at the IOC headquarters in Lausanne, Switzerland
- 7–23 February 2014 – Olympic Winter Games Observer Programme
- 14 March 2014 – Submission of the application file
- 7 July 2014 – Selection of candidate cities by the IOC Executive Board
- 7 January 2015 – Submission of candidature files and guarantees
- 14–18 February 2015 in Almaty – IOC Evaluation Commission visits
- 24–28 March 2015 in Beijing – IOC Evaluation Commission visits
- 1–2 June 2015 – Evaluation Commission report
- 9–10 June 2015 – Candidate City briefing to IOC members
- 31 July 2015 – Host city election at the 128th IOC Session in Kuala Lumpur, Malaysia

== Candidate cities venues list ==
Note that the selected candidate cities have slightly changed venues plan in the final proposal to the IOC. Almaty moved technical alpine skiing events from Shymbulak to Tau, and completely removed both Kok Zhaylau and Ak-Bulak ski resorts, previously proposed for snowboarding and freestyle skiing events. Beijing dropped both Taiwu and Wanlong ski resorts, and proposed hosting snowboarding and freestyle skiing events in the two venues (A and B) in Genting Snow Park.

Event	Almaty	Beijing
Event	KAZ	CHN
Olympics dates	4 Feb – 20 Feb	
Paralympics dates	4 Mar – 13 Mar	
Opening and closing ceremonies	Almaty Central Stadium	Beijing National Stadium
Alpine skiing	1) Shymbulak (downhill, super-G, super combined); 2) Tau Park Alpine (slalom, giant slalom)	Xiaohaituo Alpine Skiing Field (Yanqing)
Cross-country skiing	Ak Bulak Nordic Arena	Guyangshu Biathlon Field (Zhangjiakou)
Ski jumping	Sunkar Jumping Hills	Guyangshu Ski Jumping Field (Zhangjiakou)
Nordic combined	Sunkar Skiing Centre	Guyangshu Biathlon Field (Zhangjiakou)
Biathlon	Ak Bulak Nordic Arena	Hualindong Ski Resort (Zhangjiakou)
Freestyle skiing	1) Tabagan Snow Park (aerials, moguls, half-pipe); 2) Tau Park Snowboard Freestyle (ski-cross, slopestyle)	1) Genting Snow Park A (Zhangjiakou; half-pipe, slopestyle, ski cross); 2) Genting Snow Park B (moguls, aerials)
Snowboarding	1) Tabagan Snow Park (half-pipe); 2) Tau Park Snowboard Freestyle (parallel slalom, parallel giant slalom, snowboard cross, slopestyle)	Genting Snow Park A (Zhangjiakou)
Ice hockey Main Venue	Almaty Ice Palace	Wukesong Arena (Beijing)
Ice hockey	Baluan Sholak Sports Palace	Beijing National Indoor Stadium
Speed skating	Medeo	Beijing National Speed Skating Oval
Figure skating, short track	Almaty Olympic Ice Arena	Capital Indoor Stadium (Beijing)
Curling	Halyk Arena	Beijing National Aquatics Centre
Bobsleigh, luge, skeleton	Sunkar Sliding Centre	Yanqing National Sliding Centre (Yanqing)

=== Withdrawn candidate city ===
Event	Oslo
Event	NOR
Olympics dates	11 Feb – 27 Feb
Paralympics dates	11 Mar – 20 Mar
Opening and closing ceremonies	Bjerke Travbane
Alpine skiing	1) Kvitfjell (downhill, super-G, combined); 2) Hafjell (slalom, giant slalom)
Cross-country skiing	Holmenkollen
Ski jumping	1) Holmenkollbakken; 2) Midtstubakken
Nordic combined	Holmenkollen
Biathlon	Grønmo
Freestyle skiing	1) Wyller (ski cross, half-pipe, slopestyle); 2) Grefsen (moguls, aerials)
Snowboard	Wyller
Ice hockey 1	Stubberud
Ice hockey 2	Jordal Amfi
Speed skating	Valle Hovin
Figure skating Short track	Fornebu Arena
Curling	Lørenskog
Bobsleigh, luge, skeleton	Lillehammer Track

== Candidate cities comparison ==
All data comes from applicant cities' bid books. Candidate cities' public support data has been updated.

Category	Details	Almaty	Beijing
Category	Details	KAZ	CHN
Population (2014)	City	1,600,000	19,612,368
Population (2014)	Country	17,736,896	1,350,695,000
Air Quality Score	Environmental Performance Index (2014)	95.92	18.81
Public opinion, support	City	85% (July 2015)	88% (July 2015)
Public opinion, support	Country	87% (July 2015)	92% (July 2015)
Bid budget (mln USD)	Applicant phase	4.5	11.25
Bid budget (mln USD)	Candidature phase	30	18.75
Main airport (2014 / 2022)	Name	Almaty International	Beijing Capital and Daxing (in project)
Main airport (2014 / 2022)	Distance (km)	9.4	25/46
Main airport (2014 / 2022)	Capacity per hour	1600 / 4000	9900 / -
Longest distance (airports excluded)	km	47	257
Longest distance (airports excluded)	min	55	178
Accommodation (number of rooms)	Existing	36,573	109,940
Accommodation (number of rooms)	Planned	7,597	5,718
Accommodation (number of rooms)	Additional	13,503	-
Accommodation (number of rooms)	Total	57,673	115,658
Proposed sport venues (opening/closing ceremony venues excluded)	Existing (no permanent works required)	7	4
Proposed sport venues (opening/closing ceremony venues excluded)	Existing (permanent works required)	1	3
Proposed sport venues (opening/closing ceremony venues excluded)	Planned (irrespective of the games)	3	-
Proposed sport venues (opening/closing ceremony venues excluded)	Additional (games dependent)	2	6

=== Withdrawn candidate city ===
Category	Details	Oslo
Category	Details	NOR
Population (2014)	City	634,463
Population (2014)	Country	5,136,700
Air Quality Score	Environmental Performance Index (2014)	98.33
Public opinion, support	City	41% (Mar 2014)
Public opinion, support	Country	35% (Mar 2014)
Bid budget (mln USD)	Applicant phase	27
Bid budget (mln USD)	Candidature phase	25
Main airport (2014 / 2022)	Name	Oslo-Gardermoen
Main airport (2014 / 2022)	Distance (km)	50
Main airport (2014 / 2022)	Capacity per hour	4200 / 5300
Longest distance (airports excluded)	km	228
Longest distance (airports excluded)	min	165
Accommodation (number of rooms)	Existing	23,474
Accommodation (number of rooms)	Planned	142
Accommodation (number of rooms)	Additional	1,000
Accommodation (number of rooms)	Total	24,616
Proposed sport venues (opening/closing ceremony venues excluded)	Existing (no permanent works required)	1
Proposed sport venues (opening/closing ceremony venues excluded)	Existing (permanent works required)	7
Proposed sport venues (opening/closing ceremony venues excluded)	Planned (irrespective of the games)	-
Proposed sport venues (opening/closing ceremony venues excluded)	Additional (games dependent)	5

== Evaluation of the applicant cities ==
Each cell of the table provides a minimum and a maximum figure obtained by the applicant city on the specific criteria. These figures are to be compared to a benchmark which has been set at 6.

Table of scores given by the IOC Working Group to assess the quality and feasibility of the 2022 Applicant cities
Criteria	Oslo		Almaty		Beijing	
Criteria	NOR		KAZ		CHN	
Criteria	Min	Max	Min	Max	Min	Max
Games concept and competition venues	7.0	9.0	6.0	8.5	5.5	7.5
Olympic Village(s)	6.0	9.0	4.5	8.0	6.5	8.0
International Broadcast Centre/Main Press Centre	6.0	9.0	5.5	8.0	7.0	8.5
Sports experience	9.0	10.0	4.5	7.0	6.5	8.0
Environment and meteorology	8.5	9.5	5.0	6.0	5.0	7.0
Accommodation	7.0	8.0	5.0	6.5	7.0	8.5
Transport	7.5	8.5	6.0	8.0	5.0	7.5
Doping control	9.0	10.0	6.0	7.0	7.0	8.0
Safety and security	8.0	9.0	5.0	7.0	8.0	9.0
Telecommunications	8.0	9.0	5.0	7.0	7.0	9.0
Energy	8.5	9.5	4.0	6.0	6.0	8.5
Legal aspects, customs and immigration formalities	7.0	9.0	6.0	8.0	7.0	9.0
Government and public support	5.0	7.0	6.5	8.0	8.0	9.0
Finance and marketing	6.5	8.5	5.0	6.5	7.5	9.0

== Candidate cities overview ==
On 15 November 2013, the IOC announced the list of the six applicant cities. On 7 July 2014, the IOC announced that there were three remaining applicant cities that would move on to the candidate phase; these were Almaty, Beijing and Oslo.

On 1 October 2014, Oslo withdrew its application after one of the country's governing political parties Høyre decided not to support the application. The remaining two candidate cities were therefore Almaty and Beijing.

Both of the candidate cities suggested hosting the Games between February 4–20, 2022. The Paralympics will be held from March 4–13. Oslo suggested hosting the Games between February 11–27, 2022. The Paralympics will be held from March 10–20.

=== Almaty ===
Almaty
- Overview

Details
- Votes: 40
- Country: Kazakhstan

Since 2011, the National Olympic Committee of the Republic of Kazakhstan has been considering a bid for the 2022 games in Almaty, the former longtime capital city and still the largest city and financial centre of the country. Kazakhstan hosted the 2011 Asian Winter Games. Almaty will host 2017 Winter Universiade. The current Kazakh capital Astana considered to joint bid with Almaty but the idea was later declined. On 17 August 2013, Almaty announced they were bidding for the 2022 Games. Under the slogan "Keeping it Real", Almaty has emphasized her traditional winter setting with tall mountains and plenty of natural snow coverage as well as compactness — most venues are within half an hour's travel through Alpine scenery.

Presenting Kazakhstan's bid at the final event in Kuala Lumpur, Prime Minister of Kazakhstan Karim Massimov made a speech with the key message that Almaty was "not a risk choice for 2022", but "a golden opportunity to prove that smaller advancing nations can successfully host the winter games". He called to the IOC core values saying that letting Almaty host the Games was "a golden opportunity to showcase the real long-term power of Olympic legacy for a region that has never hosted the Games". In the final voting Almaty lost to Beijing by only 4 votes.

=== Beijing ===
Beijing
- Overview

Details
- Votes: 44
- Country: China

On 5 November 2013, the Chinese Olympic Committee announced that it would submit a bid for Beijing to host the 2022 Winter Olympics. Beijing (where the indoor ice sports and the ceremonies would take place), was the host city of the 2008 Summer Olympics. Zhangjiakou would host the outdoor snow events.

Before the final voting in Kuala Lumpur Beijing's bid was presented by Yang Lan, a renowned former CCTV host, who said sports and fitness were becoming a new fashion trend in China. In her speech she focused on China's economy and its ability to support every commitment it made "protecting long time financial viability and the reputation of the Games".

=== Oslo ===
Oslo
- Overview

Details
- Votes: Withdrew bid
- Country: Norway

On 6 November 2013, the Norwegian Olympic and Paralympic Committee and Confederation of Sports announced that Oslo would be submitted as the Norwegian candidate for the 2022 Winter Olympic Games. Oslo last hosted the 1952 Winter Olympics, and Norway last hosted the 1994 Winter Olympics in Lillehammer. On 1 October 2014 the Conservative Party decided that they would not support a bid for the games citing costs and lack of public support. A vast number of polls were conducted, and since April 2014 support had varied between 24% and 37%. The days leading up to the deliberation in the Conservative Party had consisted of a series of negative developments for the bid. Those negative developments included the Centre Party saying "no" through a grass root vote, a poll showing that even within the Norwegian Confederation of Sports the majority of members opposed the bid, an external revision which clarified that the newly suggested cheaper budget was unrealistic and public scrutiny on IOC´s 7000 pages of demands.

Norway rejected the Olympic committee's application for government funding to hold the event in Norway after the private organization IOC made a large number of demands which caused a scandal in Norway. The demands notably included "diva-like demands for luxury treatment" for the IOC members themselves, such as special lanes on all roads only to be used by IOC members, a cocktail reception at the Royal Palace with drinks paid for by the royal family, car and drivers for all IOC members, adjusted traffic lights, free cell phones, seasonal fruits, and all "OL-shaped" and "Olympic Appearance” furniture. The IOC also demanded "control over all advertising space throughout Oslo during the Games, to be used exclusively by official sponsors." Several commentators pointed out that such demands were unheard of in a western democracy; Slate described the IOC as a "notoriously ridiculous organization run by grifters and hereditary aristocrats."

== Applicant cities overview ==
- Kraków, Poland

On 7 November 2013, the Polish Olympic Committee announced they submitted a bid to the IOC for the 2022 Winter Olympics, together with Zakopane, Poland, and Jasná, a village in central Slovakia, near the Polish border. If the bid had been successful, it would have been the first time either Poland or Slovakia hosted the Olympics. Zakopane previously bid to host the 2006 Winter Olympics but failed to become a candidate. Kraków's bid was submitted to a local referendum held on 25 May 2014, which had a negative result. After that Kraków discontinued the application on 26 May 2014.

- Lviv, Ukraine

The National Olympic Committee of Ukraine officially submitted a bid for Lviv to host the 2022 Winter Olympic Games on 5 November 2013. On 30 June 2014, however, the IOC announced that Lviv would "turn its attention to an Olympic bid for 2026, and not continue with its application for 2022." This decision was taken as a result of the "political and economic circumstances in Ukraine".

- Stockholm, Sweden

On 11 November 2013, the Swedish Olympic Committee announced that it had submitted a bid, but on 17 January 2014, Stockholm dropped the bid due to lack of political support. Åre, about 610 km (380 mi) from Stockholm, was scheduled to host the alpine skiing events. Stockholm previously hosted the 1912 Summer Olympics and hosted equestrian events of the 1956 Summer Olympics, but this was the first time the Swedish capital had bid for the Winter Olympics. Had it won, it would have been the first city to host both the Summer Olympics and the Winter Olympics, a distinction that ultimately went to Beijing.

== Voting results for the 2022 Winter Olympics and Paralympics ==
Beijing was selected as host city of the 2022 Winter Olympics and Winter Paralympics after beating Almaty by just four votes. Beijing received one more vote than the 43 needed for majority.

2022 Winter Olympics bidding results
City	NOC	Votes
Beijing	China	44
Almaty	Kazakhstan	40

== Previously interested in bidding ==
- Tyrol–South Tyrol–Trentino Euroregion, Austria/Italy

The former parts of the County of Tyrol, Tyrol in Austria, South Tyrol and Trentino in Italy were considering a joint bid as the Euroregion Tyrol–South Tyrol–Trentino for the 2022 Olympics. The capital of Tyrol, Innsbruck, has already hosted Olympic Winter Games twice, in 1964 and 1976 as well as the 2012 Winter Youth Olympics. However, the common legislative assembly of Tyrol, South Tyrol and Trentino rejected the proposal during its session on 30 March 2011.

- Sarajevo, Bosnia and Herzegovina

After the announcement that Sarajevo would host the 2017 European Youth Winter Olympic Festival, Fahrudin Radončić, President of the Union for a Better Future of Bosnia and Herzegovina, a political party, said that Bosnia and Herzegovina would apply to host the 2022 Winter Olympics in Sarajevo, which hosted the 1984 Winter Olympics when it was part of Yugoslavia.

- Quebec City, Canada

Quebec City initially expressed interest in bidding. In September 2011, Quebec City mayor Régis Labeaume ruled out bidding for 2022. However, the city may bid for another Winter Games in the future. Former IOC President Jacques Rogge stated that he believes that the 2026 Winter Olympics would be a realistic option for the city to organize the games. Quebec has a problem finding a mountain for the downhill event, as the planned location Le Massif was not approved.

- Santiago, Chile

After an interview with then International Olympic Committee president Jacques Rogge during the 2012 Olympic Games in London discussions were started about how to organize Winter Olympics in the Southern Hemisphere for the first time. During the interview conditions in the Andes were highlighted as very suitable to stage snow sports events but a lack of existing venues for the ice sport events was identified as well.

- Nice, France

After Nice's failure to secure the French nomination for the 2018 Winter Olympics, mayor of Nice Christian Estrosi announced in 2011, and again during the 2012 Summer Games, that his city remained interested in bidding. The French Olympic Committee will make a decision after they get an autumn report about the failure of previous Olympic bids by France, but the president of the Committee also said that the probability of bidding for 2022 is weak.

- Tahko, Kuopio, and Helsinki, Finland

During the 2010 Winter Olympics in Vancouver, Jouko Purontakanen, the Secretary General of the Finland Olympic Committee, said Finland could host the games alone in Tahko, Kuopio, and Helsinki, if the project for artificial heightening of the Tahko hill progresses. Stefan Wallin, Finland's Minister for Culture and Sports, has also suggested that Finland should bid for the 2022 games with other Nordic countries after Finland's NOC discusses with them in Vancouver. Nothing followed from these suggestions: the heightening of Tahko hill did not progress since 2010 due to environmental concerns, and no Nordic countries indicated an interest to bid with Finland since the discussions in Vancouver.

- Munich, Germany

Following Munich's failed bid to host the 2018 Winter Olympics, plans for a second attempt were made. On 30 September 2013, Deutscher Olympischer Sportbund (the German National Olympic Committee) announced its intention to submit a bid for Munich to host the 2022 Winter Olympics. However, these plans were cancelled on 10 November 2013 when a majority of residents in the Munich area opposed the bid in referendums held in Munich, Garmisch-Partenkirchen and the Bavarian districts of Berchtesgadener Land and Traunstein (where the competitions would have taken place). In each locality, a majority had voted against bidding: 51.2% in Munich, 51.6% in Garmisch-Partenkirchen, 54.0% in Berchtesgadener Land, and 59.7% in Traunstein. Opponents pointed to the high costs for hosting the Olympics, environmental issues, and criticism of commercialization of sports, particularly the IOC.

In order to address concerns voiced about the 2018 bid, the 2022 Games would have been located at four different places. Only Alpine Skiing and Ski Jumping competitions would have been held at Garmisch-Partenkirchen (the host city of the 1936 Winter Olympics), whilst Nordic Skiing and Biathlon events would have taken place at existing facilities at Ruhpolding, thus minimizing the land use. The Königssee bobsleigh, luge, and skeleton track would have become another important venue. Indoor ice skating events and ski/snowboard half-pipe competitions would have been held at the Olympiapark in Munich, the main site of the 1972 Summer Olympics; and the Olympic Stadium would have been used for the opening and closing ceremonies.

- Queenstown—Christchurch, New Zealand

Queenstown, New Zealand's main winter sports centre, has toyed with the idea of bidding for hosting rights of the Winter Olympics in the past, notably a 2007 report suggesting a bid (co-hosting with Dunedin) for the 2018 games. A proposal to bring the games to the Southern Hemisphere for the first time in 2022, to be jointly held in Queenstown and Christchurch, has been mooted by a private group, but does not have general support among the country's Olympians and is seen as unlikely to proceed.

- Brașov and Prahova Valley, Romania

The mayor of Brașov, George Scripcaru, said in September 2011 that his city would be interested to bid if the 2013 European Youth Winter Olympic Festival is a success. In 2007, former Romanian Prime Minister Călin Popescu Tăriceanu announced that the country was considering a bid for the Prahova Valley. Instead of bidding for 2022, Brașov's mayor, George Scripcaru, announced in November 2013 that Brașov will be bidding to host the 2020 Winter Youth Olympics.

- Barcelona, Spain

Barcelona, which hosted the 1992 Summer Olympics, considered a bid for the 2022 Olympics, but on 25 October 2013, mayor Xavier Trias announced that "the conditions" would not exist yet. Instead, one "must concentrate to reach the Olympic target by 2026". On 13 January 2010, then mayor of Barcelona Jordi Hereu had first announced plans to host the 2022 Winter Olympics. The proposed "two cluster system" would have seen the Games being shared with La Molina, a ski resort in the Pyrenees. Indoor sports (as well as the opening, closing and medal ceremonies) would have taken place in Barcelona. On 17 June 2015, mayor Ada Colau announced Barcelona would not be bidding for the 2026 either, stating it is not a priority project for the city.

- Zaragoza, Spain

The Zaragoza-Pyrenees 2022 bid was withdrawn on 7 November 2011 and left Barcelona as sole candidate from Spain to host the 2022 Winter Olympics. Officials insisted that Barcelona never regarded Zaragoza as "a rival, but rather the opposite. Both of us championed the Pyrenees brand in our projects and that's why I believe Aragon will also benefit if Barcelona goes ahead with this bid, because it will have a positive effect on the whole Pyrenees".

- Östersund, Sweden

Ostersund was interested in a potential 2022 bid, but the Swedish Olympic Committee decided not to move forward with bidding due to a lack of financial guarantees from the government. The SOC chairman said that future applications were unlikely because of the government policy. However Sweden has applied with Stockholm as main city, with more arenas and hotels already available, therefore lower cost. Östersund previously bid for the 1994, 1998, and 2002 Winter Olympics but lost to Lillehammer, Nagano, and Salt Lake City respectively.

- Graubünden (St. Moritz/Davos), Switzerland

The intention to bid was approved in November 2010. On 24 January 2011, the Swiss Olympic Association, announced that five areas across Switzerland had shown interest in bidding to host the 2022 Winter Olympics: Geneva, Valais, Graubünden, Lucerne/Central Switzerland and Bern. After a withdrawal from Central Switzerland, the Swiss Olympic Association received four bids by 31 March 2011 deadline. The executive committee of the Swiss Olympic Association decided on 11 August 2011 to put forward a bid of the St.Moritz/Davos-area to host the 2022 Olympic Winter Games. St. Moritz hosted the Winter Olympics in 1928 and 1948.

St. Moritz/Davos presented a project that will host all events in the surrounding area of Davos and St. Moritz; generally speaking, "ice events" in Davos and "snow events" in St. Moritz. However, Davos has a hosting tradition in cross-country skiing and snowboarding, and so one would expect Davos venues for those competitions. After the decision on 11 August 2011 a feasibility study for the Games was announced including the possibility to extend ice events to Zürich. The organizers decided during a session on 22 December 2011 to go forward with "St. Moritz 2022" as the official corporate name of the bid. However at a plebiscite in Graubünden about the bid on 3 March 2013, the public voted with 41'758 to 37'540 votes (52.66% to 47.43%) against a credit for the 2022 Olympic Games, meaning that the bid will have to be dropped.

- Multiple cities, United States

Multiple cities in the United States—such as Bozeman, Montana; Denver, Colorado; Reno, Nevada; Salt Lake City, Utah —initially expressed interest in bidding for the 2022 Games, but the U.S. Olympic Committee instead opted to bid for the 2024 Summer Olympics or the 2026 Winter Olympics.

- Vancouver, Canada

After Oslo withdrew from hosting the 2022 Games, a replacement host was probably needed instead of awarding to one of the two remaining bidders which would have meant two consecutive Winter Olympics to be held in Asia. The host of the 2010 Winter Olympics, Vancouver would be a possible option. Instead, they decided to consider bidding for the 2030 Winter Olympics.
