= Almaty bid for the 2022 Winter Olympics =

Unsuccessful bid by Almaty, Kazakhstan

Bids for the 2022 Winter Olympics and Paralympics
Overview
- XXIV Olympic Winter Games; XIII Paralympic Winter Games
- Winner: Beijing; Runner-up: Almaty

Details
- City: Almaty, Kazakhstan
- NOC: National Olympic Committee of the Republic of Kazakhstan (KAZ)

Previous Games hosted
- None • Bid for 2014

Decision
- Result: 40 votes (Second place)

Almaty 2022 (Kazakh: Алматы 2022) was an unsuccessful bid for the 2022 Winter Olympics by the city of Almaty and the National Olympic Committee of the Republic of Kazakhstan. The IOC selected the host city for the 2022 Winter Olympics at the 128th IOC Session in Kuala Lumpur, Malaysia on July 31, 2015, in which Beijing won. Under the slogan “Keeping it Real,” Almaty had emphasized their traditional winter setting with tall mountains and plenty of natural snow coverage as well as compactness — most venues are within half an hour’s travel through Alpine scenery. Almaty was the only contender to have never hosted the Olympics before. Almaty previously hosted the 2017 Winter Universiade.

== History ==
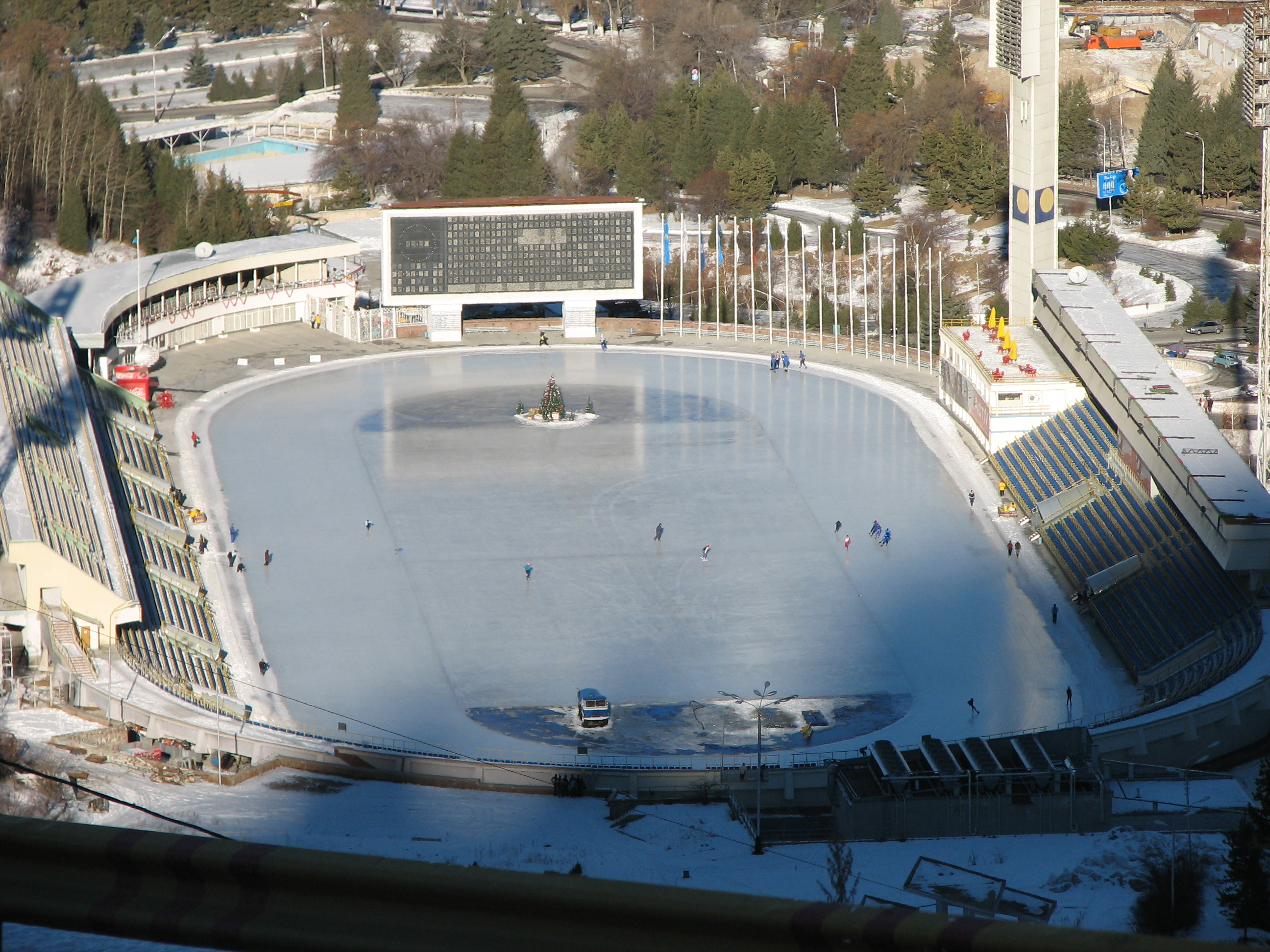
Medeo, a probable location near Almaty for skating.

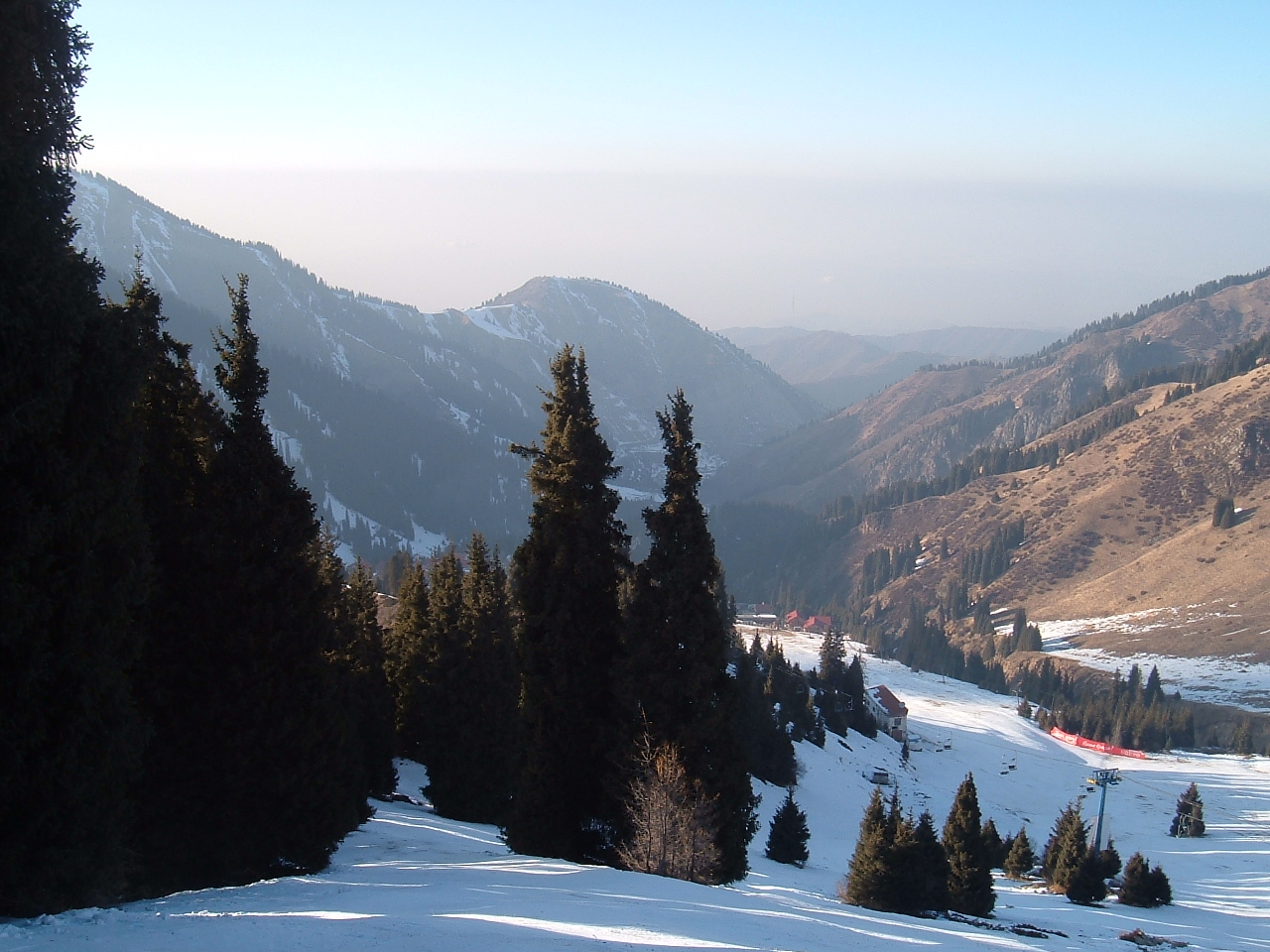
Shymbulak, planned venue for alpine skiing.

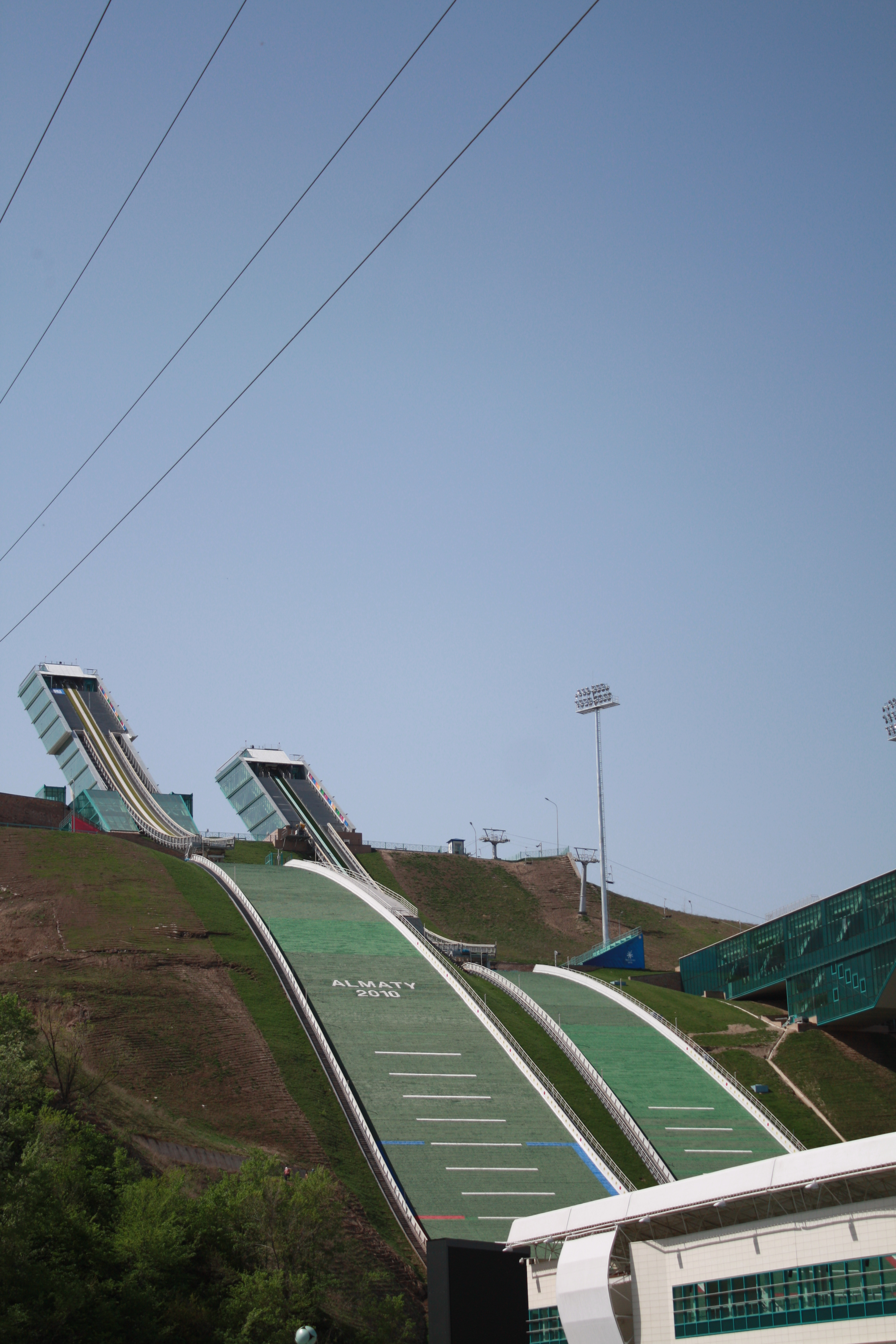
Sunkar Ski Jumping Hills Complex.

On 29 November 2011, Almaty was chosen to host the 2017 Winter Universiade. The city also co-hosted the 2011 Asian Winter Games with the capital, Astana. It can be seen as preparation for hosting the Winter Olympic Games in the future.

Kazakhstan had been considering a bid for these games since 2011. On 17 August 2013, Almaty, the former capital city and still the largest city and financial centre of the country, confirmed their bid for the 2022 Winter Olympic Games. They were the first city to do so.

=== Previous bids ===
Almaty bid to host the 2014 Winter Olympics but failed to become a candidate city. Sochi was ultimately elected as the host city on July 4, 2007. Almaty bid to host the 2022 Winter Olympic Games, but lost to previous host city Beijing.

== Venues ==
The venue plan comprises:

=== City venues ===
==== Olympic City ====
- Almaty Olympic Ice Arena - Figure skating, short track
- Non-competitive venues: Olympic Village, Main Press Centre, International Broadcast Centre, Media Village, Olympic Family Accommodations

==== Central Cluster ====
- Almaty Central Stadium - Opening and closing ceremonies
- Baluan Sholak Sports Palace - Ice hockey (women)
- Independence Square - Medal ceremonies

===== Sunkar Precinct =====
- Sunkar Jumping Hills - Ski jumping, Nordic combined
- Sunkar Skiing Centre - Nordic combined
- Sunkar Sliding Centre - Bobsleigh, luge, skeleton

==== Stand-alone venues ====
- Almaty Ice Palace - Ice hockey (men)
- Curling Arena - Curling

=== Mountain venues ===
==== Ak–Bulak Cluster ====
- Ak Bulak Nordic Arena - cross-country, biathlon
- Non-competitive venues: Olympic Village

==== Medeu Cluster ====
- Medeu - speed skating
- Shymbulak ski resort - alpine skiing (downhill, super g, super combined)
- Tau Park Snowboard Freestyle - freestyle (ski-cross, slopestyle), snowboarding (parallel slalom, parallel giant slalom, snowboard cross, slopestyle)
- Non-competitive venues: Olympic Village, Mountain Media Sub Centre

==== Tabagan Cluster ====
- Tabagan Ski Park - freestyle (aerial, mogul, half-pipe), snowboarding (half-pipe)
- Tau Park Alpine - alpine skiing (slalom, giant slalom)
