= Beijing bid for the 2022 Winter Olympics =

Bids for the 2022 Winter Olympics and Paralympics
Overview
- XXIV Olympic Winter Games; XIII Paralympic Winter Games
- Winner: Beijing; Runner-up: Almaty

Details
- City: Beijing, China
- NOC: Chinese Olympic Committee (CHN)

Previous Games hosted
- 2008 Summer Olympics; Bid for 2000 Summer

Decision
- Result: 44 votes (Winner)

Beijing 2022 was a successful bid by Beijing, China and the Chinese Olympic Committee for the 2022 Winter Olympics. The IOC selected the host city for the 2022 Winter Olympics at the 128th IOC Session in Kuala Lumpur, Malaysia on July 31, 2015, which Beijing won.

== History ==
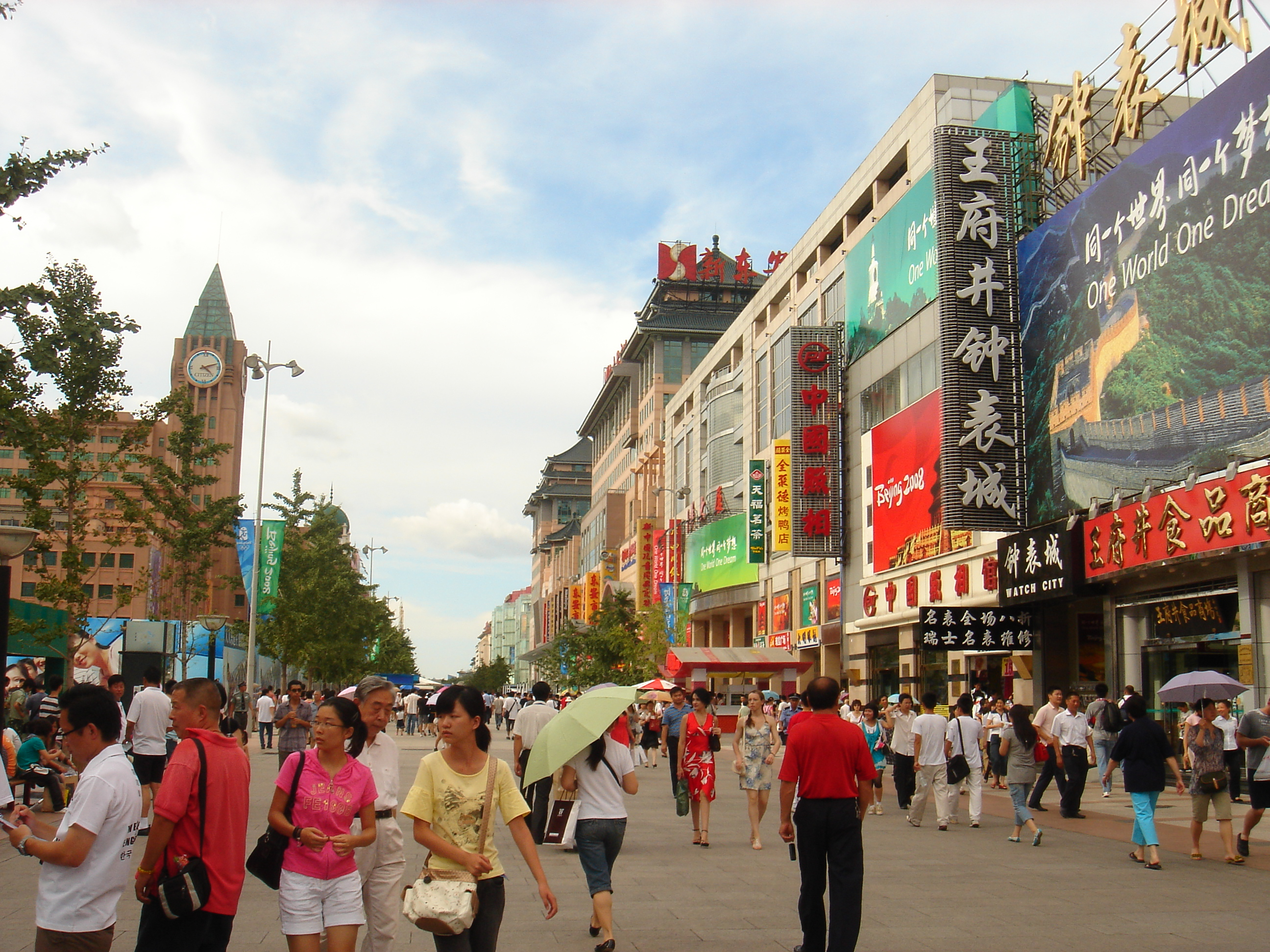
Beijing's Wangfujing Street during the 2008 Summer Olympics

The Chinese Olympic Committee nominated Beijing as the candidate city for the 2022 Winter Olympics on November 3, 2013. In addition, Zhangjiakou is the joint city for the bidding. Zhangjiakou is located 190 kilometres (120 mi) northwest of Beijing.

== Previous bids ==
Beijing bid to host the 2000 Summer Olympics, but lost out to Sydney. Beijing went on to successfully bid for and host the 2008 Summer Olympics.

=== Previous bids from other Chinese cities ===
Harbin bid to host the 2010 Winter Olympics but failed to become a candidate city. Vancouver was ultimately awarded the 2010 Winter Olympics. Harbin also bid to host the 2012 Winter Youth Olympics but failed to become a candidate. Innsbruck ultimately won the right to host the 2012 Winter Youth Olympics.

Nanjing successfully bid to host the 2014 Summer Youth Olympics.

== Venues ==
The Beijing Olympic Games Bidding Committee unveiled the gymnasium layout plan for the 2022 Winter Olympic Games on 20 February 2014: five ice events will be held at the Olympic center, the Capital Indoor Stadium and the Beijing Wukesong Sports Center. Competitions for luge, bobsleigh and alpine skiing will be held in Xiaohaituo Mountain area northwest of Beijing, 90 kilometers away from downtown. All other skiing events will be held in Taizicheng Area in Chongli District, Zhangjiakou, 220 kilometers away from downtown of Beijing and 130 kilometers away from Xiaohaituo Mountain Area.

=== Beijing Cluster ===
- Beijing National Stadium – opening and closing ceremony
- Capital Indoor Stadium – figure skating, short track
- Wukesong Sports Centre – main ice hockey venue
- National Indoor Stadium – second ice hockey venue
- Water Cube – curling
- National Speed Skating Oval – speed skating

=== Yanqing Cluster ===
- Xiaohaituo Alpine Skiing Field – alpine skiing
- Xiaohaituo Bobsleigh and Luge Track – bobsleigh, luge and skeleton

=== Zhangjiakou Cluster ===
- Kuyangshu Biathlon Field – cross-country skiing, Nordic combined
- Kuyangshu Ski Jumping Field – ski jumping, Nordic combined
- Hualindong Ski Resort – biathlon
- Genting Ski Resort – snowboarding (slopestyle, halfpipe), freestyle skiing
- Taiwu Ski Resort – snowboarding (cross), freestyle skiing
- Wanlong Ski Resort – snowboarding (parallel slalom)

== Pollution issue ==
The issue of air pollution, which was widely discussed during the 2008 Summer Olympics, was cited as a likely factor in Beijing's bid. Beijing and Zhangjiakou suffer from severe air pollution which is worse during the winter. As of February 26, 2014, Beijing hit a dangerous particulate concentration of 537. A rate of 301-500 is marked as hazardous. An anti-pollution body expressed a concern that Beijing companies failing to meet regulations were moving their factories to Tianjin and Hebei.

== Lack of snow issue ==
The lack of snow is cited by the IOC as an issue in Beijing's bid. The average snow depth in Yangqing, where the ski competitions would be held, is five centimeters.

== Human rights issue ==
A study at the University of Chicago analyzed the progress of the IOC's Agenda 2020 to demand that host countries have equitable labor laws. It concluded that the acceptance of Beijing's bid undermined this initiative.
