= 2022 Winter Olympics =

Multi-sport event in Beijing, China

XXIV Olympic Winter Games
- Emblem of the 2022 Winter Olympics
- Location: Beijing, China
- Motto: Together for a Shared Future; (一起向未来; Yīqǐ xiàng wèilái)
- Nations: 91 (including the ROC team)
- Athletes: 2,880
- Events: 109 in 7 sports (15 disciplines)
- Opening: 4 February 2022
- Closing: 20 February 2022
- Opened by: Chinese leader Xi Jinping (Note: Xi Jinping is China's nominal state representative, serving as the Chinese president. Xi is also the general secretary of the Communist Party, the most powerful position, serving as the de facto leader.)
- Closed by: IOC president Thomas Bach
- Cauldron: Dilnigar Ilhamjan and Zhao Jiawen
- Stadium: Beijing National Stadium

The 2022 Winter Olympics, officially called the XXIV Olympic Winter Games (Chinese: 第二十四届冬季奥林匹克运动会; pinyin: Dì Èrshísì Jiè Dōngjì Àolínpǐkè Yùndònghuì) and commonly known as Beijing 2022 (北京2022), were an international winter multi-sport event held from 4 to 20 February 2022, in Beijing, China, and surrounding areas with competition in selected events beginning 2 February 2022. It was the 24th edition of the Winter Olympic Games. These were the final winter games to take place under the IOC presidency of Thomas Bach.

Beijing was selected as the host city on 31 July 2015, during the 128th IOC Session in Kuala Lumpur, Malaysia, marking its second time hosting the Olympics and the last of three consecutive Games held in East Asia, following the 2018 Winter Olympics in Pyeongchang County, South Korea, and the 2020 Summer Olympics in Tokyo, Japan, held six months earlier after being postponed by a year due to the COVID-19 pandemic. Having previously hosted the 2008 Summer Olympics, Beijing became the first city to have hosted both the Summer and Winter Olympics. The venues for the Games were concentrated around Beijing, its suburb Yanqing District, and Zhangjiakou, with some events (including the ceremonies and curling) repurposing venues originally built for Beijing 2008 (such as Beijing National Stadium and the Beijing National Aquatics Centre).

The Games featured a record 109 medal events across 15 disciplines. Seven new medal events were introduced, including big air freestyle skiing and women's monobob as well as several new mixed-team competitions in freestyle skiing aerials, ski jumping, snowboard cross, and short track speed skating. A total of 2,880 athletes representing 91 teams competed in the Games, with Haiti and Saudi Arabia making their Winter Olympic debut.

Similar to the 2008 Games, Beijing's hosting of the 2022 Games was subject to various concerns and controversies including those related to human rights violations in China, such as the persecution of Uyghurs in China, which led to calls for a boycott of the Games. Out of 91 NOCS, 10 countries had diplomatically boycotted and sent athletes but no government officials, while most other countries did not join the boycott. The Games took place over two years into the COVID-19 pandemic, following the preceding 2020 Tokyo Summer Olympic Games and most events were closed to the public, with only selected events open to invited guests at a reduced capacity. To minimize the risk of virus transmission, China implemented strict health and safety measures, including a closed-loop system, frequent testing, and quarantine protocols for participants. Consequently, no major outbreaks were reported during the Games.

Norway finished at the top of the medal table for the third successive Winter Olympics, winning a total of 37 medals, of which 16 were gold, setting a new record for the largest number of gold medals won at a single Winter Olympics. Germany finished second with 12 gold and 27 medals overall. The United States finished third with 9 gold and 25 medals overall, and the host nation China finished fourth with nine gold medals and also eleventh place by total medals won (15), marking its most successful performance in Winter Olympics history. Sweden finished fifth with 8 gold and 18 medals overall, which was that nation's most successful Winter Olympics of all time in terms of both gold and total number of medals. The Russian delegation competing as the ROC ended up with the second-largest number of medals won at the Games, 32, but finished ninth on the medal table, as only five gold medals were won by the delegation. Although traditional Winter powerhouse Canada won 26 medals, only four of them were gold, resulting in a finish outside the top ten in the medal table for the first time since 1988 (34 years).

== Bidding process ==
The bidding calendar was announced by the International Olympic Committee (IOC) in October 2012, with the application deadline set for 14 November 2013. The IOC executive board reviewed the bids from all applicant cities on 7 July 2014, and selected three cities, Oslo (Norway), Almaty (Kazakhstan), and Beijing (China), as the final candidates.

Several bid cities withdrew their bids during the process, citing high costs or the lack of local support and funding for hosting the Games. The Oslo bid, considered the frontrunner, was canceled in the wake of a series of revelations about the IOC's demands for luxury treatment of IOC members that strongly turned public opinion and the parliamentary majority against the bid. The city withdrew its application for government funding after a majority of the Norwegian parliament had stated their intention to decline the application. In the days before the decision, Norwegian media had revealed the IOC's "diva-like demands for luxury treatment" for the IOC members themselves, such as special lanes on all roads only to be used by IOC members and cocktail reception at the Royal Palace with drinks paid for by the royal family. The IOC also "demanded control over all advertising space throughout Oslo" to be used exclusively by IOC's sponsors, something that is not possible in Norway because the government does not own or control "all advertising space throughout Oslo" and has no authority to give a foreign private organization exclusive use of a city and the private property within it. Several commentators pointed out that such demands were unheard of in a western democracy; Slate described the IOC as a "notoriously ridiculous organization run by grifters and hereditary aristocrats." Ole Berget, deputy minister in the Finance Ministry, said "the IOC's arrogance was an argument held high by a lot of people." The country's largest newspaper commented that "Norway is a rich country, but we don't want to spend money on wrong things, like satisfying the crazy demands from IOC apparatchiks. These insane demands that they should be treated like the king of Saudi Arabia just won't fly with the Norwegian public."

Beijing was selected as the host city of the 2022 Winter Olympics after beating Almaty by four votes on 31 July 2015, at the 128th IOC Session in Kuala Lumpur, Malaysia.

2022 Winter Olympics bidding results
City	Nation	Votes
Beijing	China	44
Almaty	Kazakhstan	40

== Impact of the COVID-19 pandemic ==
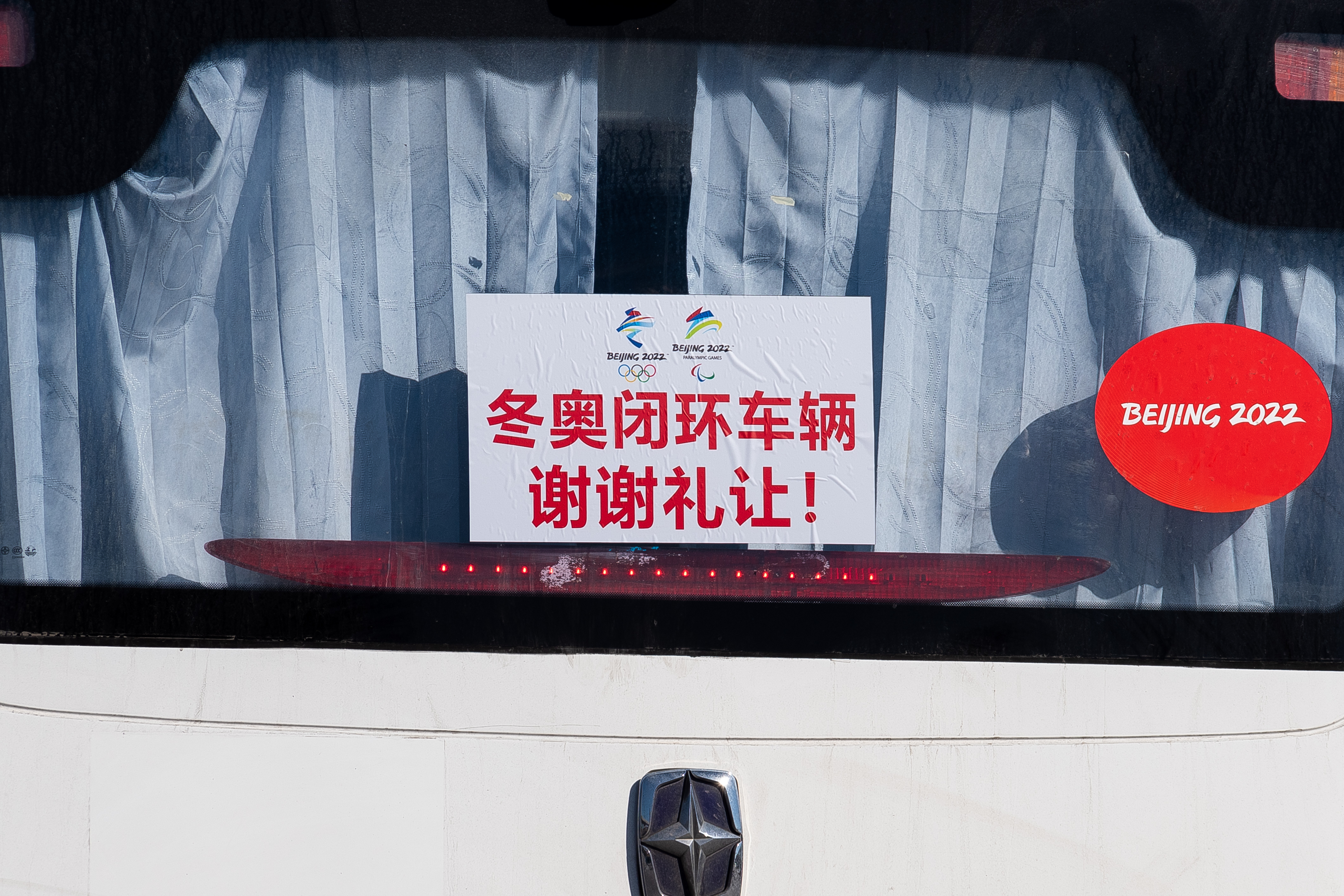
Buses serving the Olympic bubble have red stickers on front and rear

Like the 2020 Summer Olympics, the 2022 Winter Games was notable in having strict protocols to prevent a disruptive outbreak while hosting competitive events. These included mandatory health monitoring apps and daily checks for all journalists and athletes and a "closed loop" system that segregated participants from the general public. There were mixed reactions toward the necessity of the measures being used to contain COVID-19 at the Games. The Times reported that many athletes had welcomed the infection control protocols, but some athletes had pushed back. Overall, the event had a 0.01% infection rate and was able to successfully keep Omicron variant at bay. Among athletes who had tested positive, many were able to recover in the loop and compete, but a few were unable to. Due to the measures, there were no outbreaks at the Games.

The pandemic resulted in changes in the qualifying process for curling and women's ice hockey due to the cancellation of tournaments in 2020. Qualification for curling was based on placement in the 2021 World Curling Championships and an Olympic Qualification Event that completed the field (in place of points earned across the 2020 and 2021 World Curling Championships). The IIHF based its qualification for the women's tournament upon existing IIHF World Rankings, without holding the 2020 Women's World Championship.

On 29 September 2021, the IOC announced biosecurity protocols for the Games; all athletes were required to remain within the bio-secure bubble (referred to as a "closed-loop management system") for the duration of their participation, which included daily COVID-19 testing, and only being allowed to travel to and from Games-related venues. Unless they were fully-vaccinated or had a valid medical exemption, all athletes were required to quarantine for 21 days upon their arrival. Mirroring a protocol adopted for the 2020 Summer Olympics before they were moved behind closed doors, the IOC also announced that only residents of the People's Republic of China would be permitted to attend the Games as spectators.

On 23 December 2021, North America's National Hockey League (NHL) and its labor union, the National Hockey League Players' Association (NHLPA), announced that they had agreed to withdraw their players' participation in the Games' men's hockey tournament, citing concerns over COVID-19 and the need to make up games that had been postponed due to COVID-19 outbreak. As part of their latest collective agreement with the NHLPA, the NHL had agreed to accommodate a break for the Olympics and player participation for the first time since 2014.

On 17 January 2022, amid increasing lockdowns across China and the first detected case of the Omicron variant in Beijing, it was announced that ticket sales to the general public were cancelled, and that limited numbers of spectators would be admitted by invitation only. These, therefore, became the second Olympics in a row that were closed to the general public. In the lead-up to the Games, organizers stated that they had aimed for at least 30% capacity at each venue, divided equally between spectators from within the "closed loop" (including dignitaries, delegations, and the press), and invited guests from outside of it (including local residents, school students, winter sports enthusiasts, and marketing partners). At least 150,000 spectators from outside the "closed loop" were expected to attend. Spectators were only present at events held in Beijing and Zhangjiakou; all events in Yanqing were held behind closed doors with no spectators permitted.

Everyone present at the Games, including athletes, staff, and attendees, were required to use the My2022 mobile app as part of the biosecurity protocols, which was used for submissions of customs declarations and health records for travel to the Games, daily health self-reporting, and records of COVID-19 vaccination and testing. The app also provided news and information relating to the Games, and messaging functions. Concerns were raised about the security of the My2022 app and how information collected by it would be used, so several delegations advised their athletes to bring burner phones and laptops.

Because of the strict COVID-19 protocol, some top athletes, considered to be medal contenders, were not able to travel to China after having tested positive, even if asymptomatic. The cases included Austrian ski jumper Marita Kramer, the leader of the World Cup ranking, and Russian skeletonist Nikita Tregubov, silver medalist of the 2018 Winter Olympics.

== Development and preparations ==
=== Venues ===
Location of the three Beijing 2022 clusters

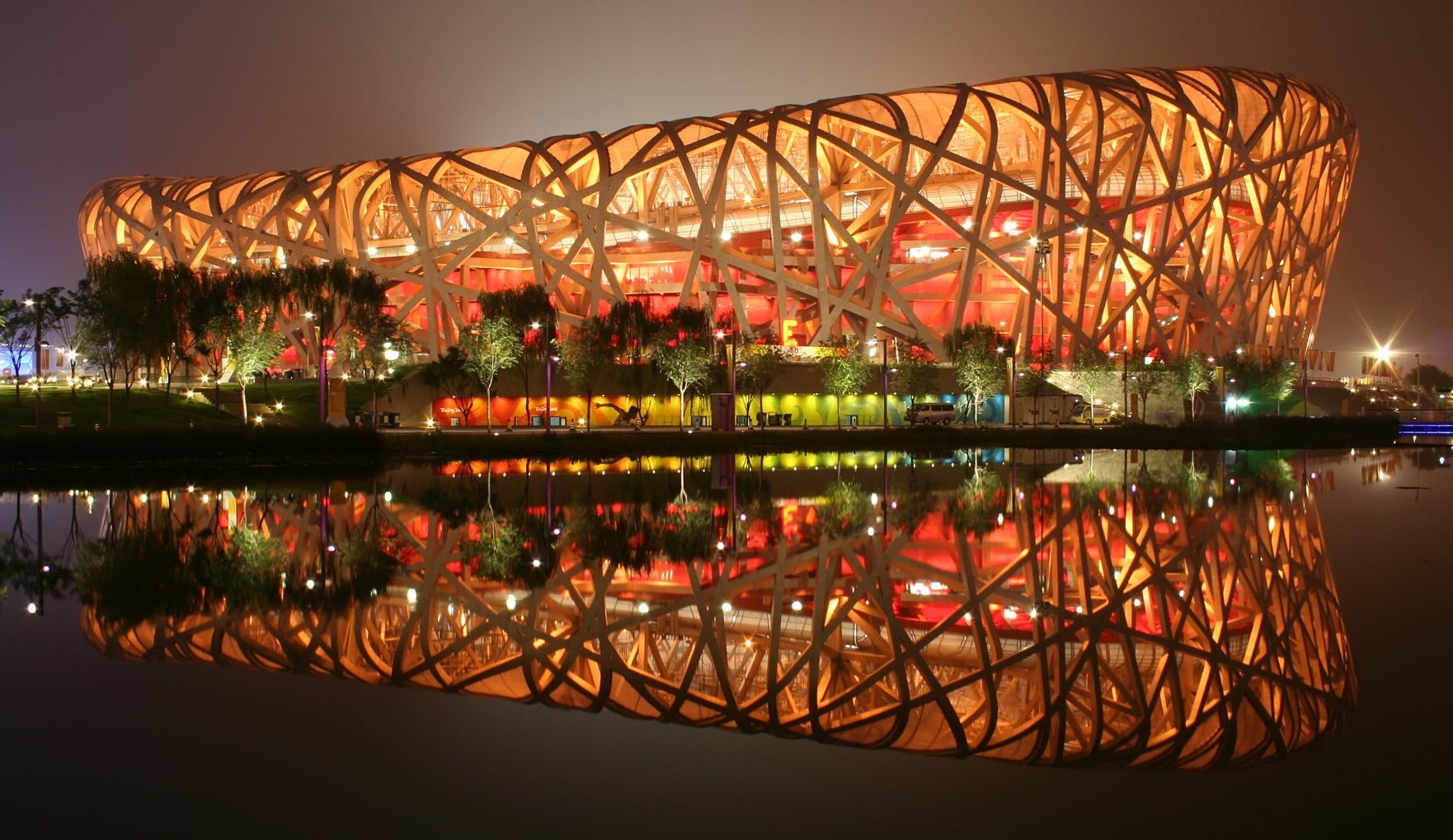
Beijing National Stadium

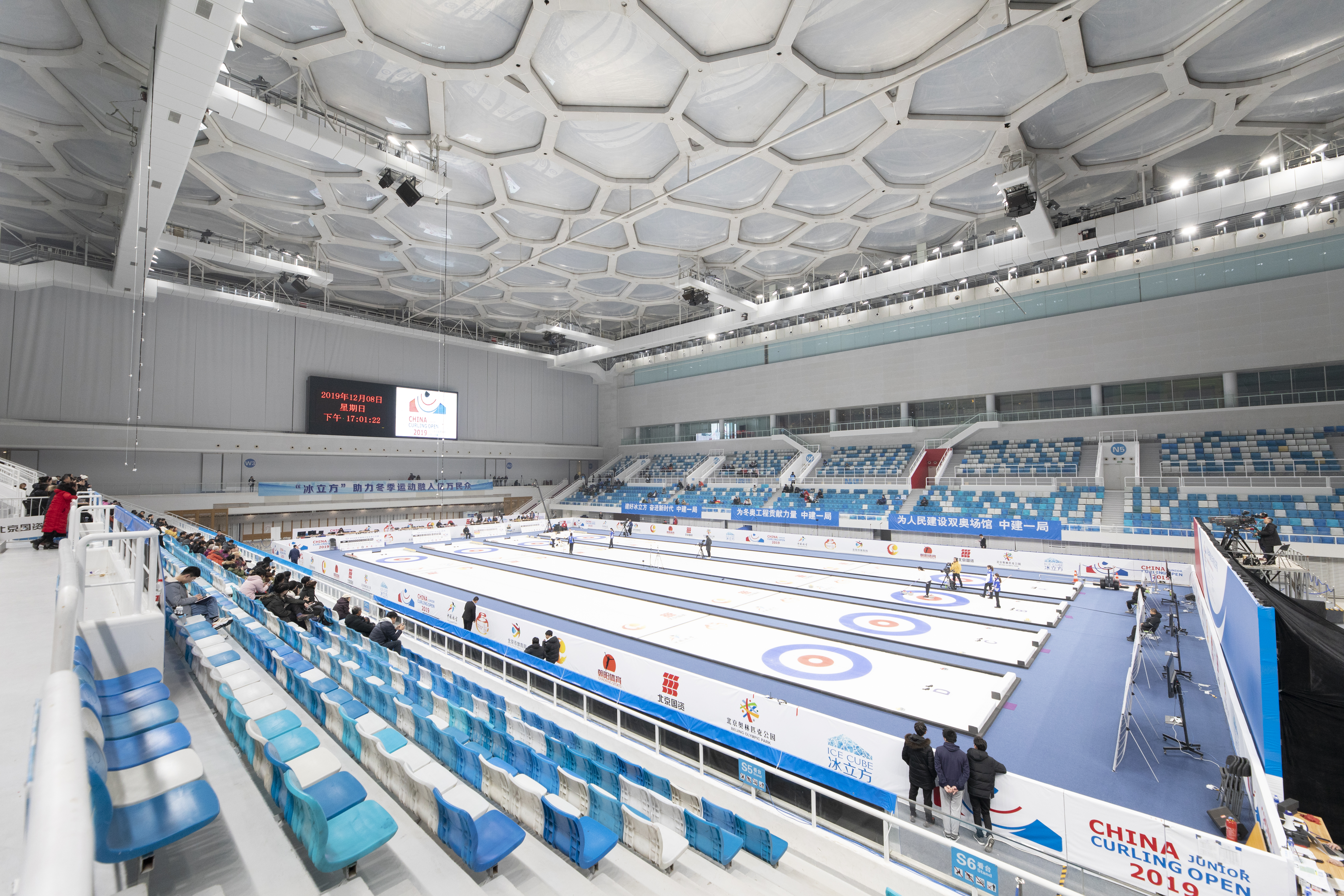
National Aquatics Center

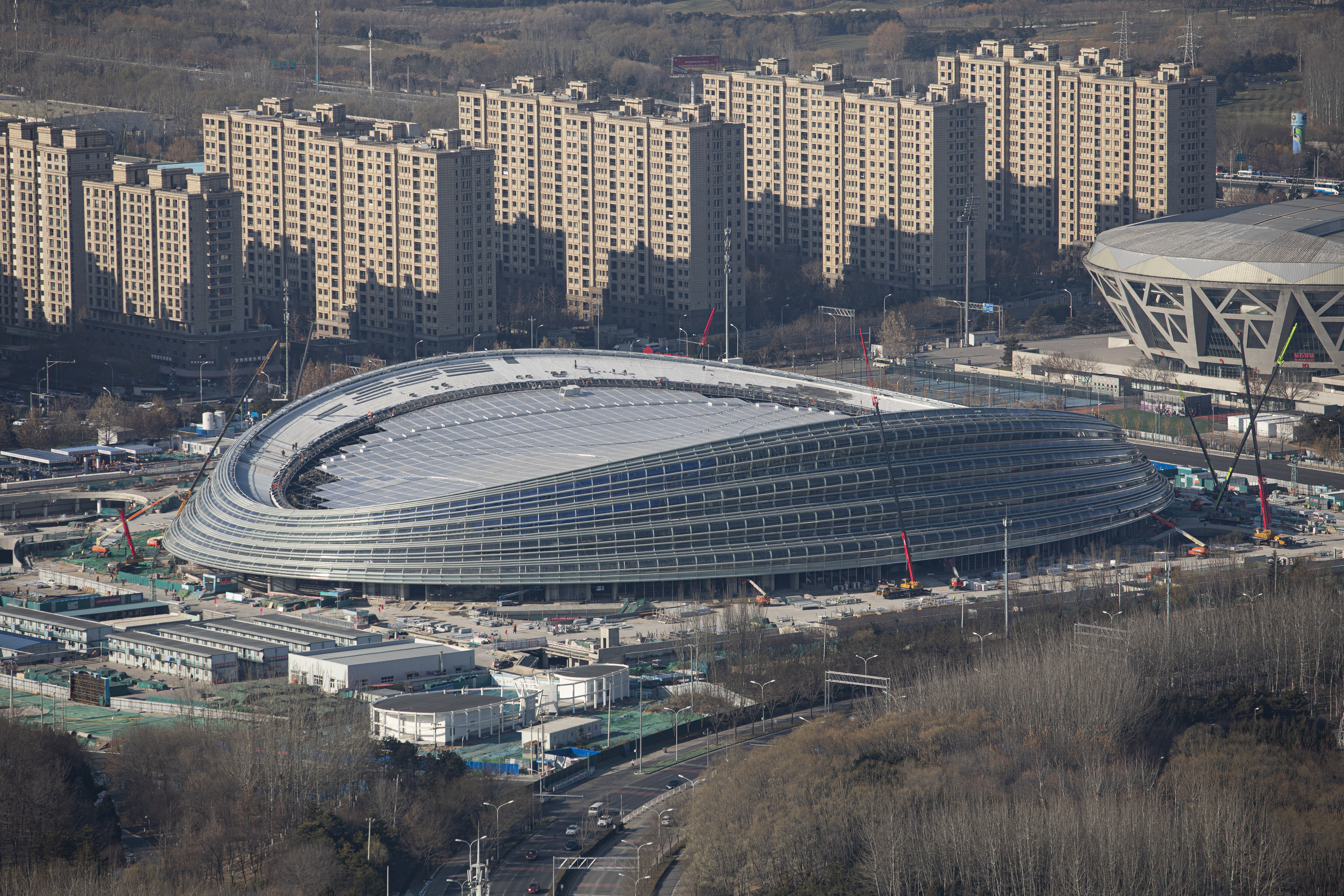
Beijing National Speed Skating Oval

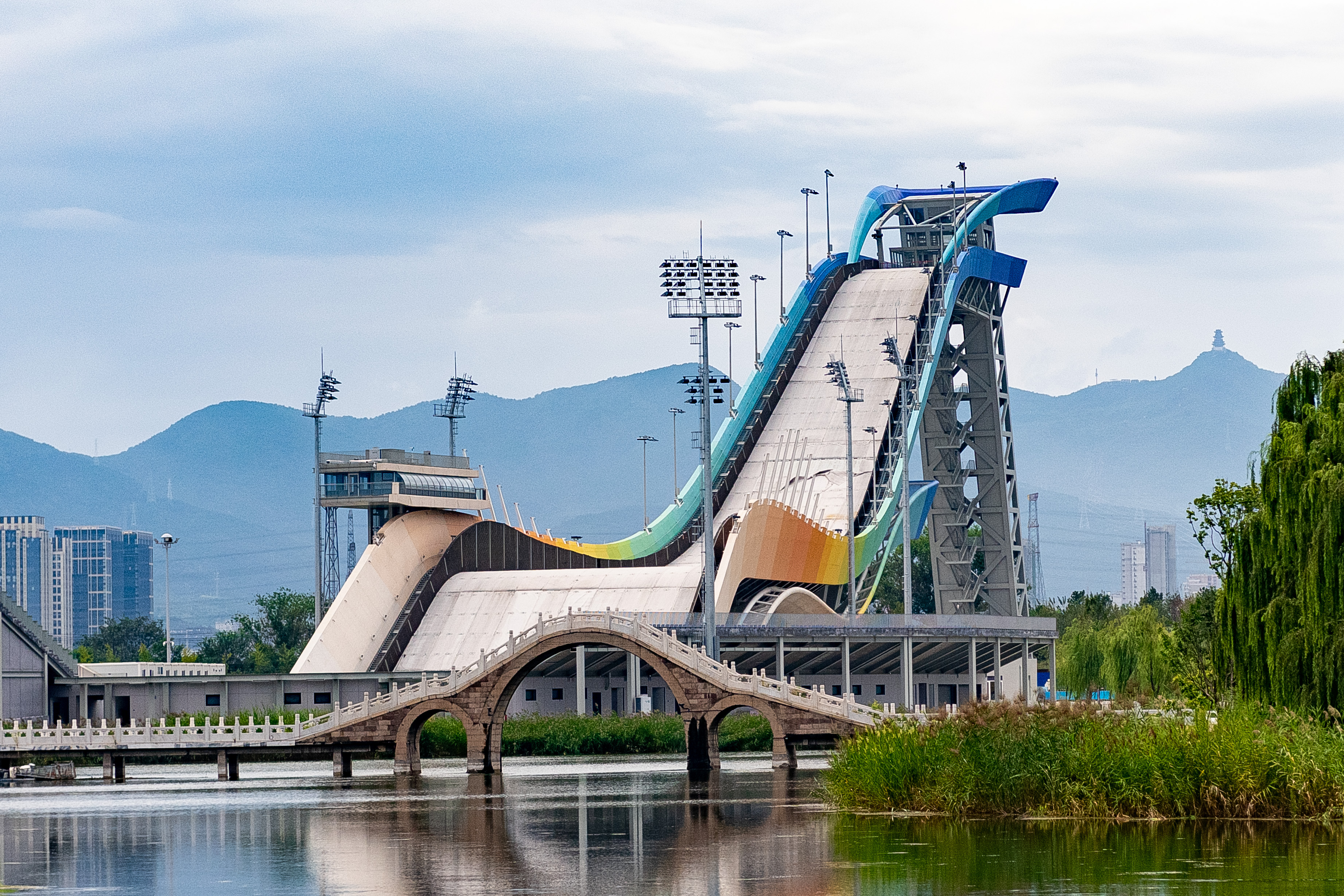
Shougang Big Air Venue

In February 2021, Beijing announced that the 26 venues (including training venues) for these sports would be running on entirely renewable energy.

There were three different clusters of venues designed and constructed for the 2022 Winter Olympics, each respectively known as the Beijing Zone, the Zhangjiakou Zone, and the Yanqing Zone.

==== Beijing Zone ====
Venues in the Beijing Zone existed in different conditions; some were recently constructed exclusively for the 2022 games, while the rest were renovated from the 2008 Summer Olympics or other existing sites. The Beijing Zone of the 2022 Winter Olympics consisted of six competition venues and was where the opening and closing ceremonies, for both the 2022 Winter Olympics and 2008 Summer Olympics, took place.

Five ice events were held at the Olympic Green, the Capital Indoor Stadium, and the Beijing Wukesong Sports Center, which had been some of the main venues of the 2008 Summer Olympics. The Big Air snowboarding and freestyle skiing events were held in a former industrial area in the Shijingshan District, in the Western Hills area. Since the end of 2009, the Beijing Olympic Village apartments on the Olympic Green had been transformed into a residential area. There was therefore a need to build another Olympic Village on a smaller scale for the Winter Olympics. These new buildings were located in the southern area of Olympic Green on the neighborhood of the National Olympic Sports Center and served as a Chinese Olympic Committee residential complex for athletes who underwent training at the nearby venues.

The Beijing National Stadium (Chinese: 国家体育场) is an iconic venue in the Beijing Zone, also known as the Bird's Nest (鸟巢). The Beijing National Stadium was the site that hosted the opening and closing ceremonies for the 2022 Winter Olympics, but it did not host any competition in 2022.

The National Aquatics Center (国家游泳中心), also known as the Water Cube (水立方), was the venue for Curling competition. In the 2022 Winter Olympics, the National Aquatics Center became the first Olympic venue to have curling ice sheets atop a swimming pool.

The Shougang Big Air (首钢滑雪大跳台中心) was newly constructed for the 2022 Winter Olympics. The Shougang Big Air hosted the freestyle skiing and snowboarding events.

The Wukesong Sports Centre (五棵松体育馆) was under an eight-month renovation for the 2022 Winter Olympics. In February 2022, the Wukesong Sports Centre hosted the 2022 Winter Olympics Men's and Women's ice hockey tournaments.

The National Indoor Stadium (国家体育馆) was the second venue for the ice hockey tournament for the 2022 Winter Olympics, besides the Wukesong Sports Centre.

The National Speed Skating Oval (国家速滑馆) has the nickname "Ice Ribbon" due to its exterior design. The National Speed Skating Oval was the venue for speed skating in the 2022 Winter Olympics.

The Capital Indoor Stadium (首都体育馆), also known as the Capital Gymnasium, was a venue adapted from the 2008 Summer Olympics and was reconstructed for short-track speed skating and figure skating competitions in the 2022 Winter Olympics.

- Beijing National Stadium – opening, awarding and closing ceremonies / 80,000 existing
- Beijing National Aquatics Centre – curling / 3,795 renovated
- Beijing National Indoor Stadium – ice hockey / 19,418 existing
- Beijing National Speed Skating Oval – speed skating / 11,950 new
- Capital Indoor Stadium – figure skating, short track speed skating / 13,289 existing
- Wukesong Sports Centre – ice hockey / 15,384 existing
- Big Air Shougang – snowboarding (Big Air), freestyle skiing (Big Air) – 4,912 new
- Beijing 2022 Winter Olympic Village – new

Yanqing District is a suburban district localized at the Beijing's far north. Competitions for luge, skeleton, bobsleigh, and alpine skiing were held in Xiaohaituo Mountain area in the West Dazhuangke village (Note: Originally simply Zhuangke. It is said that the village Dazhuangke has been officially renamed Xidazhuangke/West Dazhuangke to avoid confusion with the other Dazhuangke, also in Yanqing District. Zhuangke (庄窠) approximately means peasant dwellings/households in certain dialects of Jin Chinese; Zhuangke (庄科) is a Mandarin corruption of Jin Chinese Zhuangke (庄窠).) of Zhangshanying in Yanqing District, northwest of the urban area of Beijing, 90 kilometres (56 miles) away from the city center of Beijing and 17.5 kilometres (10.9 miles) away from the town of Yanqing, using artificial snow because of the rarity of natural snow in this region.

- National Alpine Ski Centre (Rock, Ice River) – alpine skiing 4,800 new
- National Sliding Centre – bobsleigh, luge, skeleton / 7,400 new
- Yanqing Olympic Village / new

==== Zhangjiakou Zone ====
All other skiing events were held in Taizicheng Area in Chongli District, Zhangjiakou city, Hebei province. It is 220 km (140 mi) from downtown Beijing and 130 km (81 mi) away from Xiaohaituo Mountain Area. The ski resort earned over ¥1.54 billion (US$237.77 million) in tourism during the 2015–16 winter season for a 31.6% growth over the previous season. In 2016, it was announced that Chongli received 2.185M tourists, an increase of 30% from the previous season, during the first snow season after winning the Olympic bid. The snow season lasted for five months from November, during which Chongli hosted 36 competitions and activities, such as Far East Cup and Children Skiing International Festival. A total of 23 skiing camps have also been set up, attracting the participation of 3,800 youths. All the venues construction started in November 2016, were finished in the first half of 2021, and passed testing by November 2021.

- Snow Ruyi – ski jumping, Nordic combined (ski jumping) 6,000
- National Biathlon Centre – biathlon 6,024
- Genting Snow Park
  - Park A – Ski and snowboard cross 1,774
  - Park B – Halfpipe and Slopestyle (freestyle skiing and snowboard) 2,550
  - Park C – Aerials and Moguls 1,597
- National Cross-Country Centre – Nordic combined (cross-country), cross-country 6,023
- Zhangjiakou Olympic Village
- Zhangjiakou Medals Plaza

=== Medals ===
The design for the Games' medals was unveiled on 26 October 2021. The concept was based on the 2008 Summer Olympics medals and Chinese astronomy and astrology, as the games were held coinciding with the Chinese New Year festivities.

The uniforms for medal presenters at medal ceremonies were unveiled in January 2022. The uniforms had been designed in a joint project by the Central Academy of Fine Arts and Beijing Institute of Fashion Technology.

=== Torch relay ===
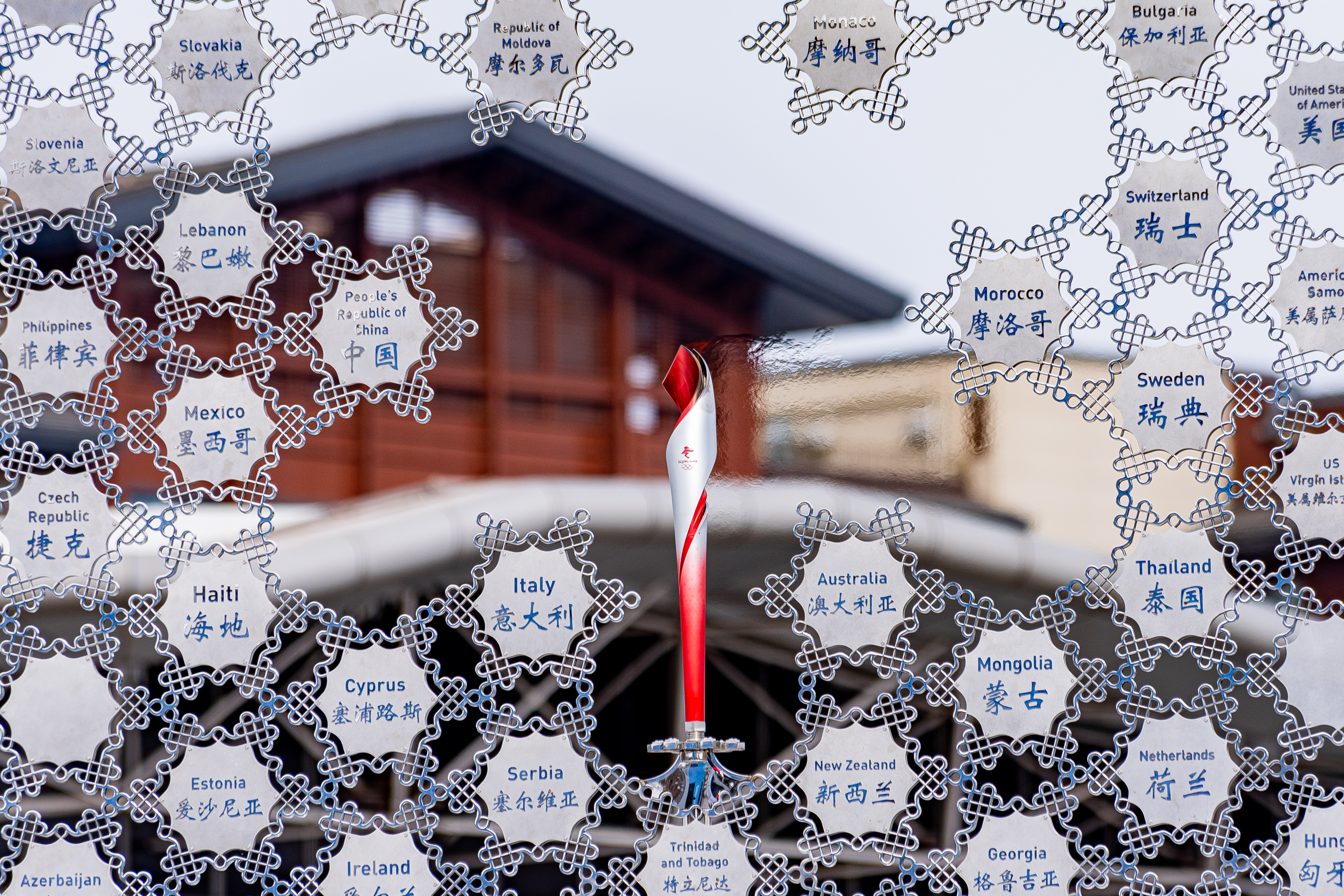
A torch serves as the cauldron in Yanqing

The torch relay started on 18 October 2021, in Greece. On 20 October 2021, it was announced that the local leg would start on 2 February and end on 4 February 2022, during the opening ceremonies. The local leg only visited two cities: Beijing and Zhangjiakou. Activists staged a protest at the Olympic torch lighting ceremony in Greece.

The inclusion and television appearance of Qi Fabao, a People's Liberation Army commander well known in China for his involvement in the 2020–2021 China–India skirmishes, as one of 1,200 torchbearers have been controversial, with India launching a diplomatic boycott of the Games as a result.

=== Transportation ===
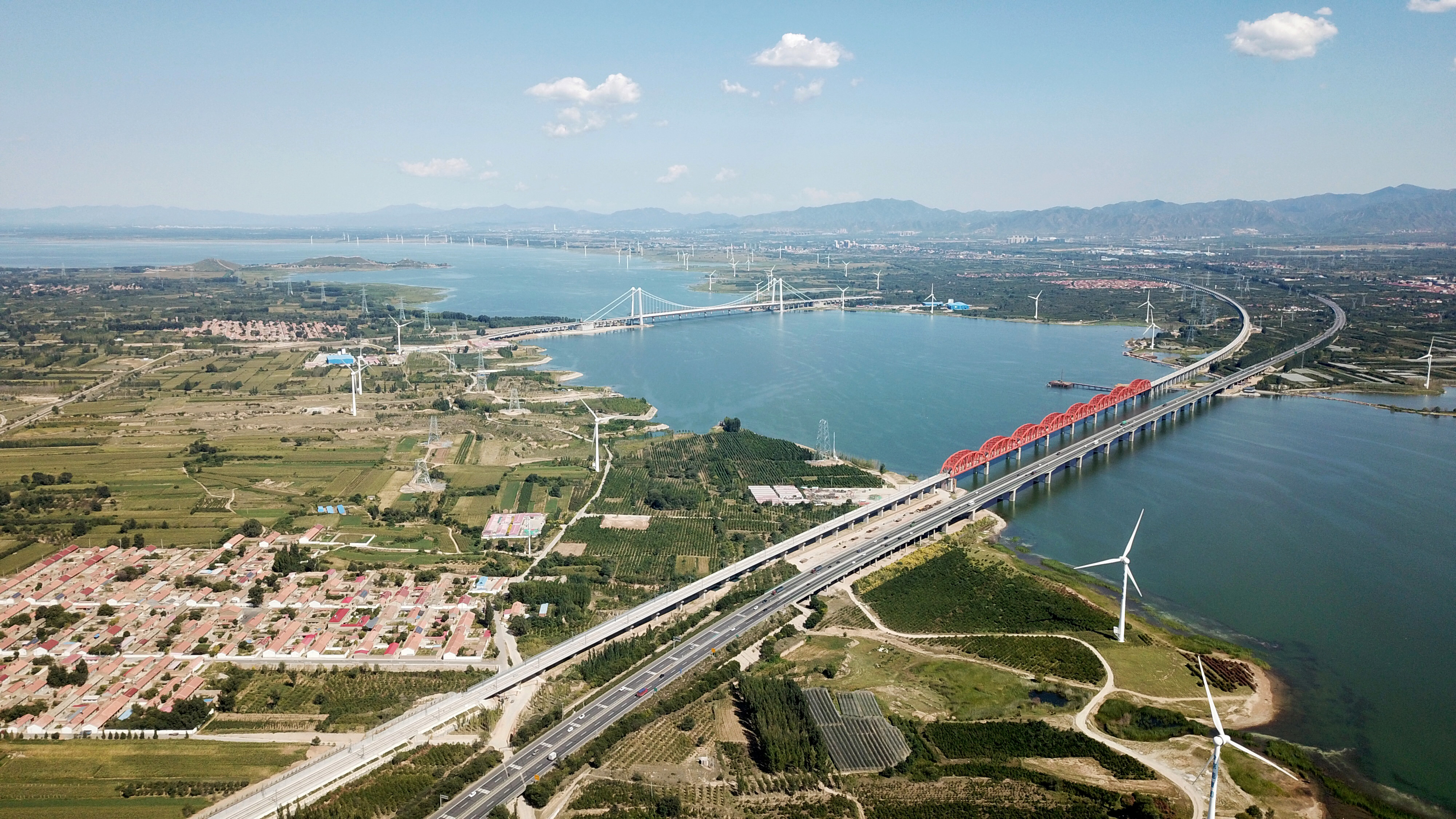
G6 Beijing–Lhasa Expressway and Beijing–Zhangjiakou intercity railway connect Beijing with Zhangjiakou.

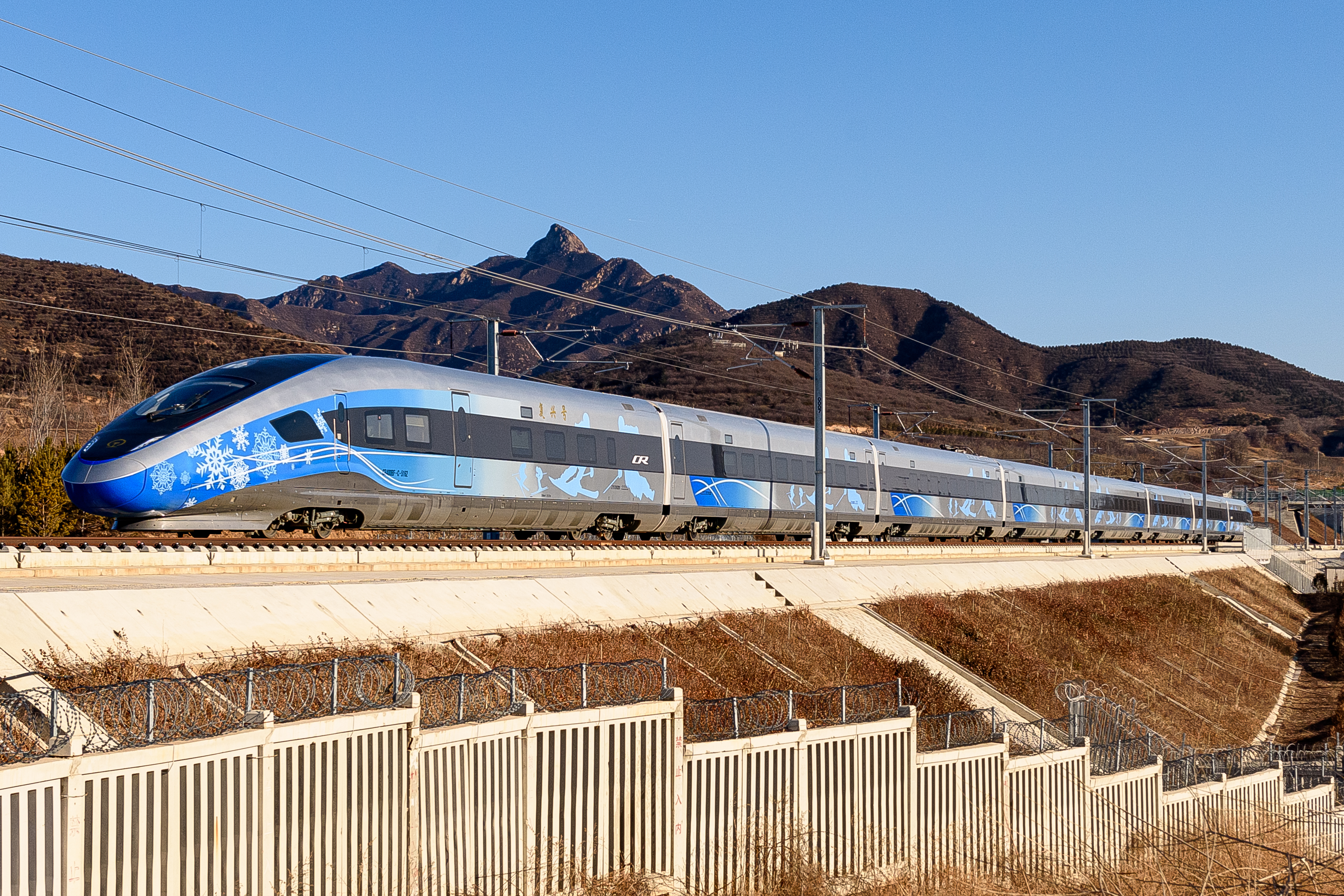
CR400BF-C-5162 had been converted to a dedicated train for the Winter Olympics.

The new Beijing–Zhangjiakou intercity railway opened in late 2019, starting from Beijing North railway station and ending at Zhangjiakou railway station. It was built for speeds of up to 350 km/h (220 mph); with this new road system, the travel time from Beijing to Zhangjiakou was decreased to around 50 minutes. A dedicated train for the Winter Olympics began to run on this line in January 2022, featuring a mobile television studio that supported live broadcast on the train.

On 31 December 2021, the Beijing Subway reached the planned 783 km (487 mi) at the bid book.

Planned before the city was awarded the rights to the Games, the Beijing Daxing International Airport opened in 2019, and due to the strategic location, it would be the main focus for the arrival and entry of delegations on Chinese soil. Chinese officials had hoped this airport would replace Beijing Capital International Airport as the country's main hub for arrivals and departures between its opening and the Winter Games and reduce the international and domestic demands of the older airport. This airport replaced the old Beijing Nanyuan Airport, which was out of date and was on the list of the most dangerous airports in the world because of its location and since its opening, it has been sharing the local and international demands of the city and the country with the older Beijing Capital International Airport. However, according to the COVID-19 pandemic security protocol manual issued by BOCWOG and International Olympic Committee, all foreign delegations could only enter and leave Beijing via the Capital International Airport due to its smaller size, closer proximity to the city center and Olympic Green, specific isolation areas, and better health protocols.

=== Budget ===
The original estimated budget for the Games was US$3.9B, less than one-tenth of the $43B spent on the 2008 Summer Olympics. Although there were reports that the Games might cost more than US$38.5B, the final official budget was US$2.24B and turned a profit of $52M, of which the International Olympic Committee (IOC) donated $10.4M of that surplus to the Chinese Olympic Committee (COC) to help with the development of sport in China.

=== Carbon Neutrality ===
The 2022 Winter Olympics was promoted as a carbon neutral Games that had a 100% green energy policy, where all competition venues were to be powered entirely by renewable energy, delivered through the specially constructed Zhangbei direct current (DC) grid, that transferred wind and solar energy from Zhangjiakou to Beijing. Five of the seven ice venues had been reused from the previous 2008 Summer Olympics. The 2022 Winter Games was also the first to use natural CO2 refrigerants to reduce carbon emissions from the cooling process to near zero. To offset remaining emissions, 80,000 hectares of forest were planted in Beijing and Zhangjiakou. All passenger cars and 85% of official vehicles were clean energy or fuel efficient, including 816 hydrogen-fueled vehicles.

Some researchers commended Beijing's mitigation of a wide range of emissions, but cautioned that future Olympic Games should rely less on carbon offsetting to risk creating junk assets that cannot be maintained after the games are completed. Critics had argued that the use of afforestation and grid-connected renewable energy projects, might also have existed regardless of the Olympics, and that it was questionable on whether those carbon offsets could be fairly counted as a result of the Winter Olympics and termed it as "green-washing".

== Ceremonies ==
=== Opening ceremony ===
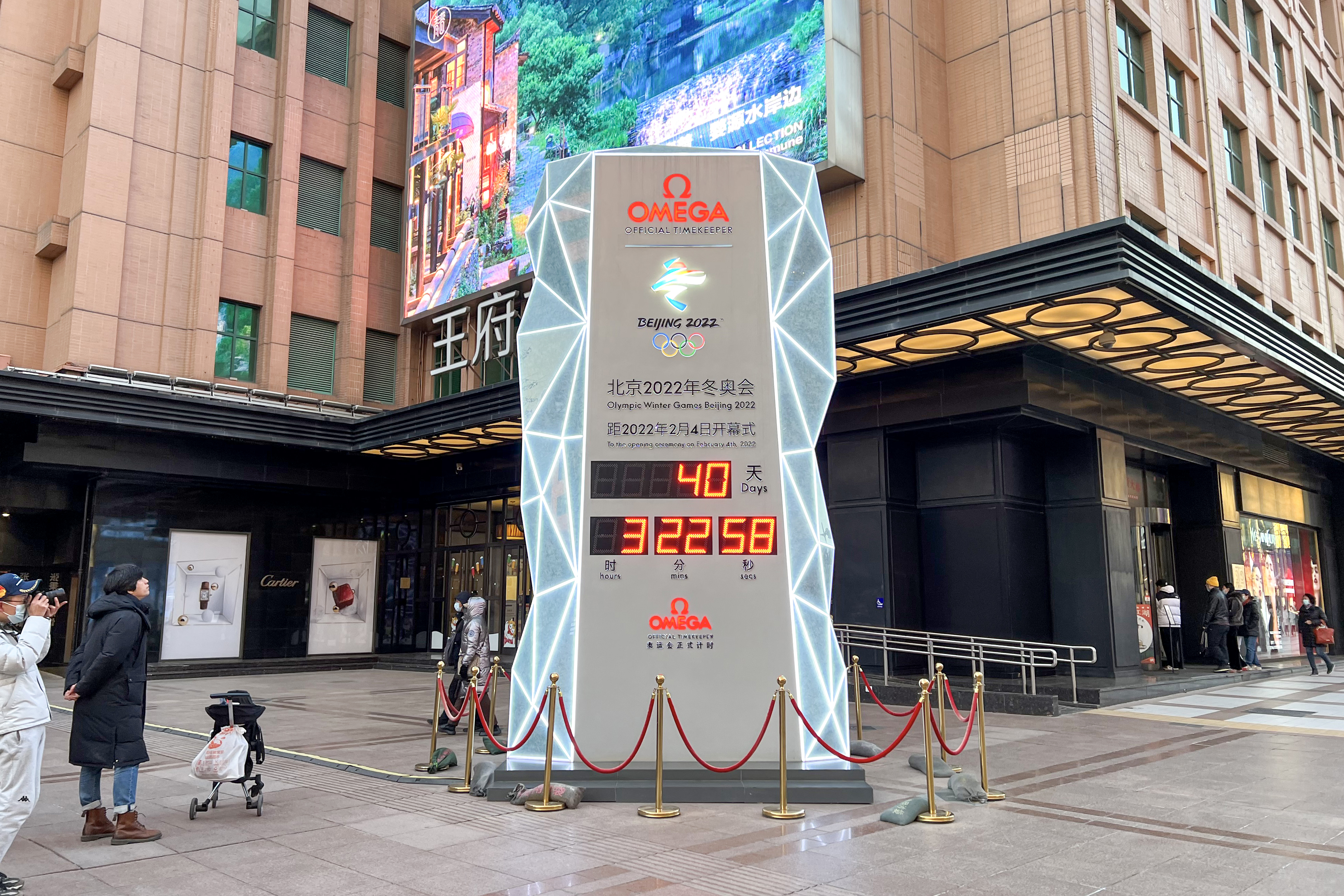
Winter Olympics countdown clock at Wangfujing Dept Store (26 December 2021)

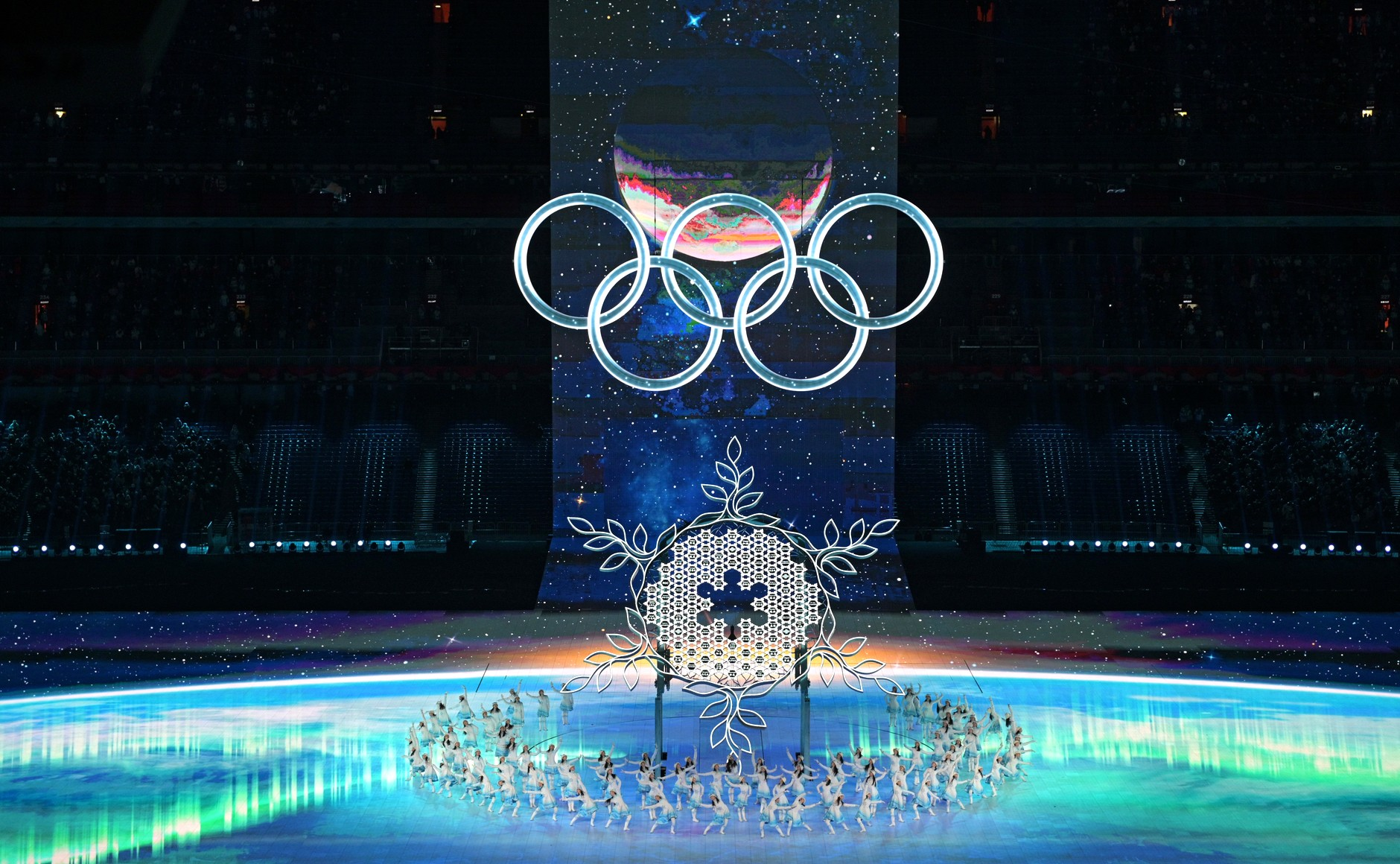
A scene from the opening ceremony; in lieu of a cauldron, the Olympic torch was mounted in the centre of a large snowflake sculpture

The opening ceremony of the 2022 Winter Olympics was held on 4 February 2022, at Beijing National Stadium.

Amid the political controversies and tensions impacting the Games, IOC president Thomas Bach instructed athletes to "show how the world would look like, if we all respect the same rules and each other", and pledged that "there [would] be no discrimination for any reason whatsoever."

The final seven torchbearers reflected multiple decades of Chinese athletes, beginning with the 1950s and concluding with two skiers competing in the Games: 21-year-old skier Zhao Jiawen from Shanxi (the first Chinese athlete to compete in Nordic combined), and 20-year-old Dinigeer Yilamujiang from the Xinjiang autonomous region (cross-country, and the first Chinese cross-country skier to win a medal in an ISF event).

For the first time in Olympic history, the final torchbearers did not light a cauldron: instead, they fitted the torch into the centre of a large stylised snowflake, constructed from placards bearing the names of the delegations competing in the Games. Three similar snowflakes were also erected as public flames, with one outside of the stadium lit by a volunteer, one in Yanqing District lit by speed skater Yu Jongjun, and the third in Zhangjiakou lit by skier Wang Wezhuo.

=== Closing ceremony ===
The closing ceremony of the 2022 Winter Olympics was held at Beijing National Stadium on 20 February 2022; it included a cultural presentation, closing remarks, and the formal handover to Milan and Cortina d'Ampezzo as co-hosts of the 2026 Winter Olympics.

== Sports ==
The 2022 Winter Olympics included a record 109 medal events over 15 disciplines in seven sports. There were seven new medal events, including men's and women's big air freestyle, women's monobob, mixed-team competitions in freestyle skiing aerials, ski jumping, and snowboard cross, and the mixed relay in short track speed skating.

Numbers in parentheses indicate the number of medal events contested in each discipline.

- Alpine skiing (11)
- Biathlon (11)
- Bobsleigh (4)
- Cross-country skiing (12)
- Curling (3)
- Figure skating (5)
- Freestyle skiing (13)
- Ice hockey (2)
- Luge (4)
- Nordic combined (3)
- Short-track speed skating (9)
- Skeleton (2)
- Ski jumping (5)
- Snowboarding (11)
- Speed skating (14)

=== New events ===
In October 2016, the International Ski Federation (FIS) announced plans to begin permitting women's competitions in Nordic combined, to contest the discipline at the Olympic level for the first time in Beijing. In November 2017, three more events were put forward by the FIS for possible Olympic inclusion: a ski jumping mixed-team competition and men's and women's big air in freestyle skiing. At their May 2018 Congress at the Costa Navarino resort in Messenia, Greece, the FIS submitted several additional events for consideration, including a proposal to make telemark skiing an Olympic discipline for the first time in Beijing, with proposed competitions to include the men's and women's parallel sprint and a mixed-team parallel sprint. The Congress also approved to submit the aerials mixed-team event, and several new snowboarding events: the men and women's snowboard cross team event; a mixed-team alpine parallel event; the men's and women's parallel special slalom; and a mixed-team parallel special slalom event. The individual parallel special slalom events were featured at the 2014 Winter Olympics in Sochi, Russia, but were dropped from the Olympic program in 2018 to make way for the snowboarding big air competitions.

The International Luge Federation (FIL) proposed the addition of six new events, including natural track luge (men's and women's singles), a women's doubles competition on the artificial track, and sprint events (men, women, and doubles) on the artificial track.

The International Skating Union (ISU) continued to campaign for the addition of synchronized skating as a new event within the discipline of figure skating. The ISU also proposed a new mixed-team event in short track speed skating.

In biathlon, a single mixed relay was proposed by the International Biathlon Union (IBU) to complement the four-person mixed relay that featured at the 2018 Winter Olympics. Also, the International Bobsleigh and Skeleton Federation (IBSF) proposed a new team event, but there was no plan to introduce a four-woman bobsleigh event despite the recommendation from the federation's executive board to propose such an event in the interests of gender equality.

In July 2018, the IOC announced changes to the program for the 2022 Winter Olympics as part of a goal to increase women's participation and appeal to younger audiences. Seven new medal events were added (expanding the total program to 109 events), including men's and women's big air freestyle, women's monobob, mixed-team competitions in freestyle skiing aerials, ski jumping, and snowboard cross, and the mixed relay in short track speed skating. Women's Nordic combined was not added; Nordic combined remained the only Winter Olympic sport only contested by men.

== Participating National Olympic Committees ==
On 9 December 2019, the World Anti-Doping Agency (WADA) banned Russia from all international sport for four years, after the Russian government was found to have tampered with lab data that it provided to WADA in January 2019 as a condition of the Russian Anti-Doping Agency being reinstated. As a result of the ban, WADA planned to allow individually cleared Russian athletes to take part in the 2020 Summer Olympics under a neutral banner, as instigated at the 2018 Winter Olympics, but they were not permitted to compete in team sports. WADA Compliance Review Committee head Jonathan Taylor stated that the IOC would not be able to use "Olympic Athletes from Russia" (OAR) again, as it did in 2018, emphasising that neutral athletes cannot be portrayed as representing a specific country. Russia later filed an appeal to the Court of Arbitration for Sport (CAS) against the WADA decision.

After reviewing the case on appeal, CAS ruled on 17 December 2020 to reduce the penalty WADA had placed on Russia. Instead of banning Russia from sporting events, the ruling allowed Russia to participate in the Olympics and other international events, but for two years, the team cannot use the Russian name, flag, or anthem and must present themselves as "Neutral Athlete" or "Neutral Team." The ruling does allow for team uniforms to display "Russia" on the uniform as well as the use of the Russian flag colours within the uniform's design, although the name should be up to equal predominance as the "Neutral Athlete/Team" designation.

On 19 February 2021, it was announced that Russia would compete under the acronym "ROC" after the name of the Russian Olympic Committee although the name of the committee itself in full could not be used to refer to the delegation. Russia would be represented by the flag of the Russian Olympic Committee.

On 8 September 2021, the IOC executive board suspended the Olympic Committee of the Democratic People's Republic of Korea (North Korea) through at least the end of 2022 for violations of the Olympic Charter, over its refusal to send athletes to the 2020 Summer Olympics in Tokyo due to COVID-19 pandemic-related concerns. North Korean athletes would be allowed to participate under the Olympic flag. However, North Korean Ministry of Sports and the National Olympic Committee said in a letter to the 2022 Beijing Winter Olympics Organizing Committee, the Chinese Olympic Committee, and the General Administration of Sport of China on 7 January 2022 that "Due to the "action of hostile forces" and the COVID-19 pandemic, they would not be able to participate in the 2022 Beijing Winter Olympics." In addition, the North Korean Olympic Committee said "supports all the work of our comrades in China to host a grand and wonderful Olympics. The U.S. and its followers are plotting anti-Chinese conspiracies to obstruct the successful hosting of the Olympics, but this is an insult to the spirit of the Olympic Charter and an act to damage China's international image. We firmly oppose and reject these actions."

The following 91 National Olympic Committees have qualified athletes (two fewer than four years earlier), with Haiti and Saudi Arabia making their Winter Olympic débuts. Kenya qualified one athlete, but withdrew.

Participating countries at the 2022 Winter Olympics Countries making their debuts at the Winter Olympics Host city (Beijing)

Country by team size

Participating National Olympic Committees
Albania (1); American Samoa (1); Andorra (5); Argentina (6); Armenia (6); Australia (43); Austria (106); Azerbaijan (2); Belarus (26); Belgium (19); Bolivia (2); Bosnia and Herzegovina (6); Brazil (10); Bulgaria (15); Canada (215); Chile (4); China (182) (Host); Chinese Taipei (4); Colombia (3); Croatia (11); Cyprus (1); Czech Republic (114); Denmark (62); Ecuador (1); Eritrea (1); Estonia (26); Finland (95); France (86); Georgia (9); Germany (149); Ghana (1); Great Britain (50); Greece (5); Haiti (1); Hong Kong (3); Hungary (14); Iceland (5); India (1); Iran (3); Ireland (6); Israel (6); Italy (118); Jamaica (7); Japan (124); Kazakhstan (34); Kosovo (2); Kyrgyzstan (1); Latvia (60); Lebanon (3); Liechtenstein (2); Lithuania (13); Luxembourg (2); Madagascar (2); Malaysia (2); Malta (1); Mexico (4); Moldova (5); Monaco (3); Mongolia (2); Montenegro (3); Morocco (1); Netherlands (41); New Zealand (15); Nigeria (1); North Macedonia (3); Norway (84); Pakistan (1); Peru (1); Philippines (1); Poland (57); Portugal (3); Puerto Rico (2); ROC (212) (Note: Neutral athletes from Russia competed under the flag of the Russian Olympic Committee instead of under the Olympic flag like in 2018.); Romania (21); San Marino (2); Saudi Arabia (1); Serbia (2); Slovakia (50); Slovenia (42); South Korea (64); Spain (14); Sweden (116); Switzerland (167); Thailand (4); Timor-Leste (1); Trinidad and Tobago (2); Turkey (7); Ukraine (45); United States (224); Uzbekistan (1); Virgin Islands (1)
NOCs that participated in 2018, but did not in 2022.	NOCs that participated in 2022, but did not in 2018.
Bermuda; Kenya; North Korea (Note: NOC suspended.); Olympic Athletes from Russia; Singapore; South Africa; Togo; Tonga	American Samoa; Haiti; ROC; Peru; Saudi Arabia; Trinidad and Tobago; Virgin Islands

=== Number of athletes by National Olympic Committee ===
2,871 athletes from 91 NOCs:

Ranking	NOC	Athletes
1	United States	224
2	Canada	215
3	ROC	212
4	China	182
5	Switzerland	167
6	Germany	149
7	Japan	124
8	Italy	118
9	Sweden	116
10	Czech Republic	114
11	Austria	106
12	Finland	95
13	France	86
14	Norway	84
15	South Korea	64
16	Denmark	62
17	Latvia	60
18	Poland	57
19	Great Britain	50
20	Slovakia	50
21	Ukraine	45
23	Australia	43
22	Slovenia	42
24	Netherlands	41
25	Kazakhstan	34
26	Belarus	26
26	Estonia	26
28	Romania	21
29	Belgium	19
30	Bulgaria	15
30	New Zealand	15
32	Hungary	14
32	Spain	14
34	Lithuania	13
35	Croatia	11
36	Brazil	10
37	Georgia	9
38	Turkey	7
38	Jamaica	7
40	Argentina	6
40	Armenia	6
40	Bosnia and Herzegovina	6
40	Ireland	6
40	Israel	6
45	Andorra	5
45	Greece	5
45	Iceland	5
45	Moldova	5
49	Chile	4
49	Chinese Taipei	4
49	Mexico	4
49	Thailand	4
53	Colombia	3
53	Hong Kong	3
53	Iran	3
53	Lebanon	3
53	Monaco	3
53	Montenegro	3
53	North Macedonia	3
53	Portugal	3
61	Azerbaijan	2
61	Bolivia	2
61	Kosovo	2
61	Liechtenstein	2
61	Luxembourg	2
61	Madagascar	2
61	Malaysia	2
61	Mongolia	2
61	Puerto Rico	2
61	San Marino	2
61	Serbia	2
61	Trinidad and Tobago	2
73	Albania	1
73	American Samoa	1
73	Cyprus	1
73	Ecuador	1
73	Eritrea	1
73	Ghana	1
73	Haiti	1
73	India	1
73	Kyrgyzstan	1
73	Malta	1
73	Morocco	1
73	Nigeria	1
73	Pakistan	1
73	Peru	1
73	Philippines	1
73	Saudi Arabia	1
73	Timor-Leste	1
73	Uzbekistan	1
73	Virgin Islands	1
Total		2,871

== Calendar ==
Competition began two days before the opening ceremony on 2 February, and ended on 20 February 2022. Organizers went through several revisions of the schedule, and each edition needed to be approved by the IOC.

All times and dates use China Standard Time (UTC+8)

OC	Opening ceremony	●	Event competitions	1	Event finals	EG	Exhibition gala	CC	Closing ceremony

February 2022	2nd Wed	3rd Thu	4th Fri	5th Sat	6th Sun	7th Mon	8th Tue	9th Wed	10th Thu	11th Fri	12th Sat	13th Sun	14th Mon	15th Tue	16th Wed	17th Thu	18th Fri	19th Sat	20th Sun	Events
Ceremonies			OC																CC	—N/a
Alpine skiing						2	1	1	1	1		1		1	1	1			1	11
Biathlon				1		1	1			1	1	2		1	1		2			11
Bobsleigh												●	1	1			●	1	1	4
Cross-country skiing				1	1		2		1	1	1	1			2			1	1	12
Curling	●	●	●	●	●	●	1	●	●	●	●	●	●	●	●	●	●	1	1	3
Figure skating			●		●	1	●		1		●		1	●		1	●	1	EG	5
Freestyle skiing		●		1	1	●	1	1	1				1	1	2	1	2	1		13
Ice hockey		●	●	●	●	●	●	●	●	●	●	●	●	●	●	1	●	●	1	2
Luge				●	1	●	1	1	1											4
Nordic combined								1						1		1				3
Short track speed skating				1		2		1		1		2			2					9
Skeleton									●	1	1									2
Ski jumping				1	1	1				●	1		1							5
Snowboarding				●	1	1	2	1	2	1	1		●	2						11
Speed skating				1	1	1	1		1	1	1	1		2		1	1	2		14
Daily medal events	0	0	0	6	6	9	10	6	8	7	6	7	4	9	8	6	5	7	5	109
Cumulative total	0	0	0	6	12	21	31	37	45	52	58	65	69	78	86	92	97	104	109	109
February 2022	2nd Wed	3rd Thu	4th Fri	5th Sat	6th Sun	7th Mon	8th Tue	9th Wed	10th Thu	11th Fri	12th Sat	13th Sun	14th Mon	15th Tue	16th Wed	17th Thu	18th Fri	19th Sat	20th Sun	Total events

== Medal table ==
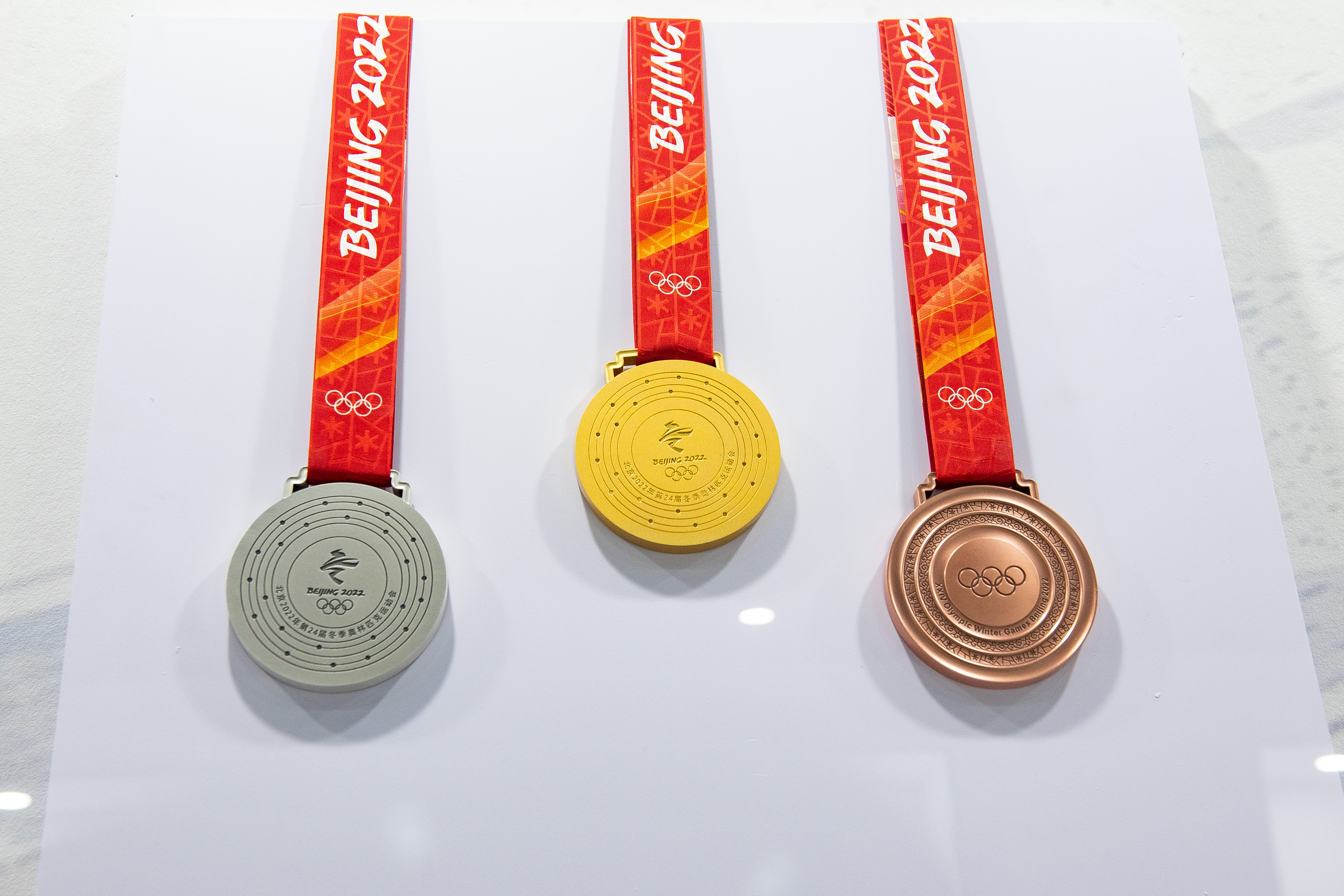
Medals of 2022 Winter Olympics

‡ Change in medal table

* Host nation (China)

2022 Winter Olympics medal table
Rank	NOC	Gold	Silver	Bronze	Total
1	Norway	16	8	13	37
2	Germany	12	10	5	27
3	United States‡	9	9	7	25
4	China*	9	4	2	15
5	Sweden	8	5	5	18
6	Netherlands	8	5	4	17
7	Austria	7	7	4	18
8	Switzerland	7	2	6	15
9	ROC‡	5	12	15	32
10	France	5	7	2	14
11–29	Remaining	23	40	47	110
Totals (29 entries)		109	109	110	328

=== Podium sweeps ===
Date	Sport	Event	Team	Gold	Silver	Bronze	Ref
15 February	Bobsleigh	Two-man bob	Germany	Francesco Friedrich; Thorsten Margis	Johannes Lochner; Florian Bauer	Christoph Hafer; Matthias Sommer	

=== Changes in medal standings ===
On 29 January 2024, CAS disqualified Kamila Valieva, a Russian figure skater, for four years (retroactive to 25 December 2021) for an anti-doping rule violation. On 30 January 2024, the ISU reallocated medals in the figure skating team event to upgrade the U.S. to gold and Japan to silver while downgrading ROC to bronze.

== Marketing ==
=== Emblem ===
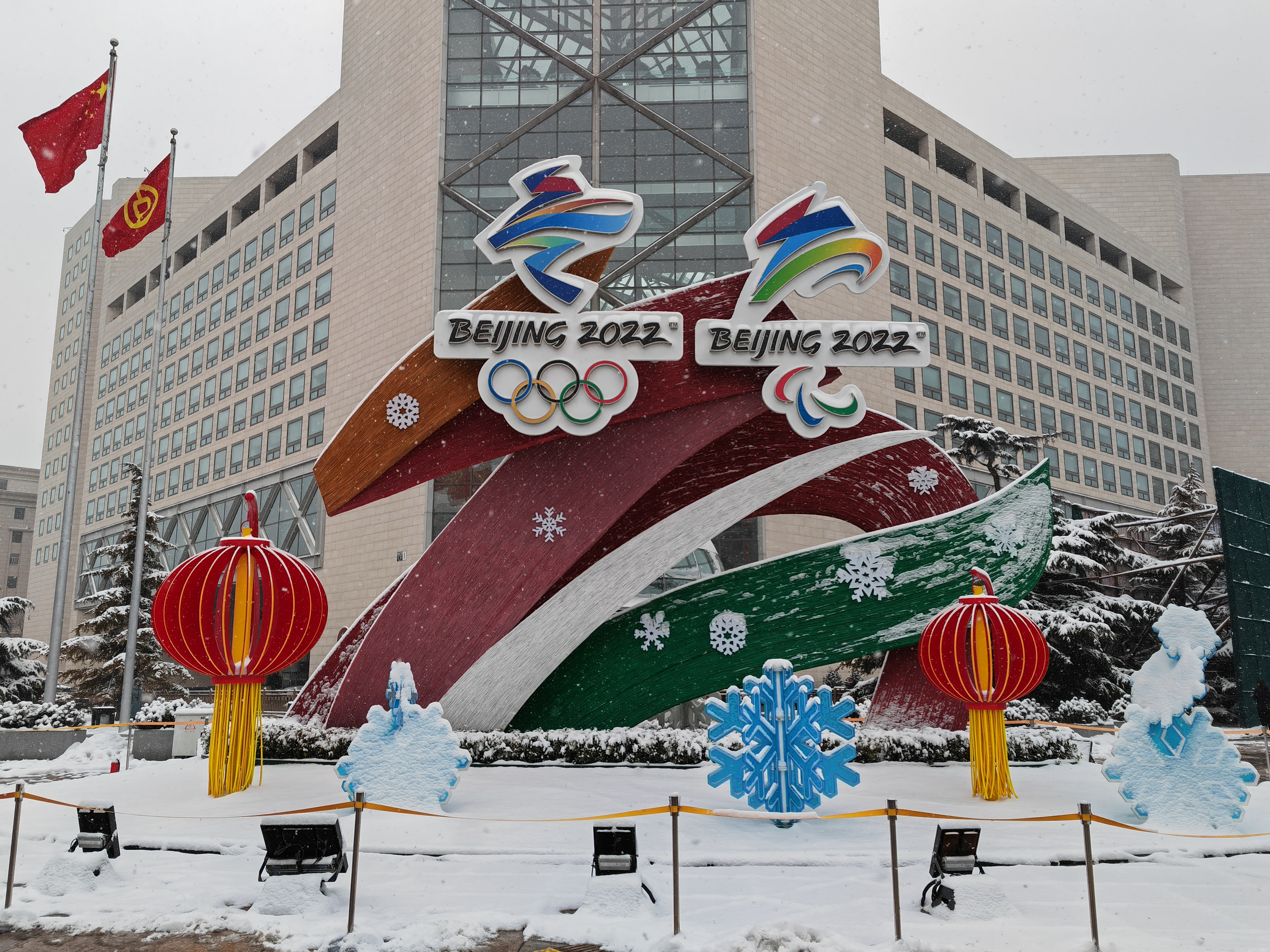
Flower bed along Chang'an Avenue.

The emblem for the 2022 Winter Olympics, "Winter Dream" (冬梦), was unveiled on 15 December 2017 at the Beijing National Aquatics Center. Designed by Lin Cunzhen (who previously designed the emblem of the 2014 Summer Youth Olympics in Nanjing), the emblem is a stylised rendition of the Chinese character for winter (冬) as a multi-coloured ribbon, reflecting upon the landscapes of the host region. The beginning of the ribbon symbolises an ice skater, while the end of the ribbon symbolises a skier. The emblem carries a blue, red, and yellow colour scheme: the latter two colours represent both the flag of China, and "passion, youth, and vitality".

=== Mascot ===
Bing Dwen Dwen was the mascot of the 2022 Winter Olympics. Bing Dwen Dwen was chosen from thousands of Chinese designs in 35 countries worldwide. "Bing" (冰) means ice in Chinese, and was meant to suggest purity and strength. "Dwen Dwen" (墩墩) was meant to suggest robustness, liveliness, and youth. Bing Dwen Dwen's astronaut-like clothes implied that the Winter Olympics embraced new technologies and created possibilities.

=== Slogan ===
The Games' official slogan, "Together for a Shared Future" (Chinese: 一起向未来; pinyin: Yīqǐ xiàng wèilái), was announced on 17 September 2021; organisers stated that the slogan was intended to reflect "the power of the Games to overcome global challenges as a community".

The slogan was compared in media with Chinese leader Xi Jinping's policy slogan: 'Building the Common Future of Humanity'.

== Viewership ==
- Independent research conducted on behalf of the International Olympic Committee (IOC) recorded 2.01B viewers across television and digital platforms.
- A total of 713B minutes of coverage was watched on various Olympic Media Rights Partners' channels, which represents an 18% increase when comparing with the last Winter Olympics.

== Broadcasting ==
In China, domestic rights to these Games were owned by China Media Group (CMG), with rights being sublicensed by China Mobile's Migu streaming service.

These Games confirmed an ongoing trend in U.S. viewership of the Olympics; while television viewership had seen a further decline, they were offset by increases in social media engagement and streaming viewership of the Games. Similar trends were seen in Europe, where amidst falling TV ratings Eurosport reported an eight-fold increase in streaming viewership on its platforms and Discovery+ over Pyeongchang 2018.

== Concerns and controversies ==
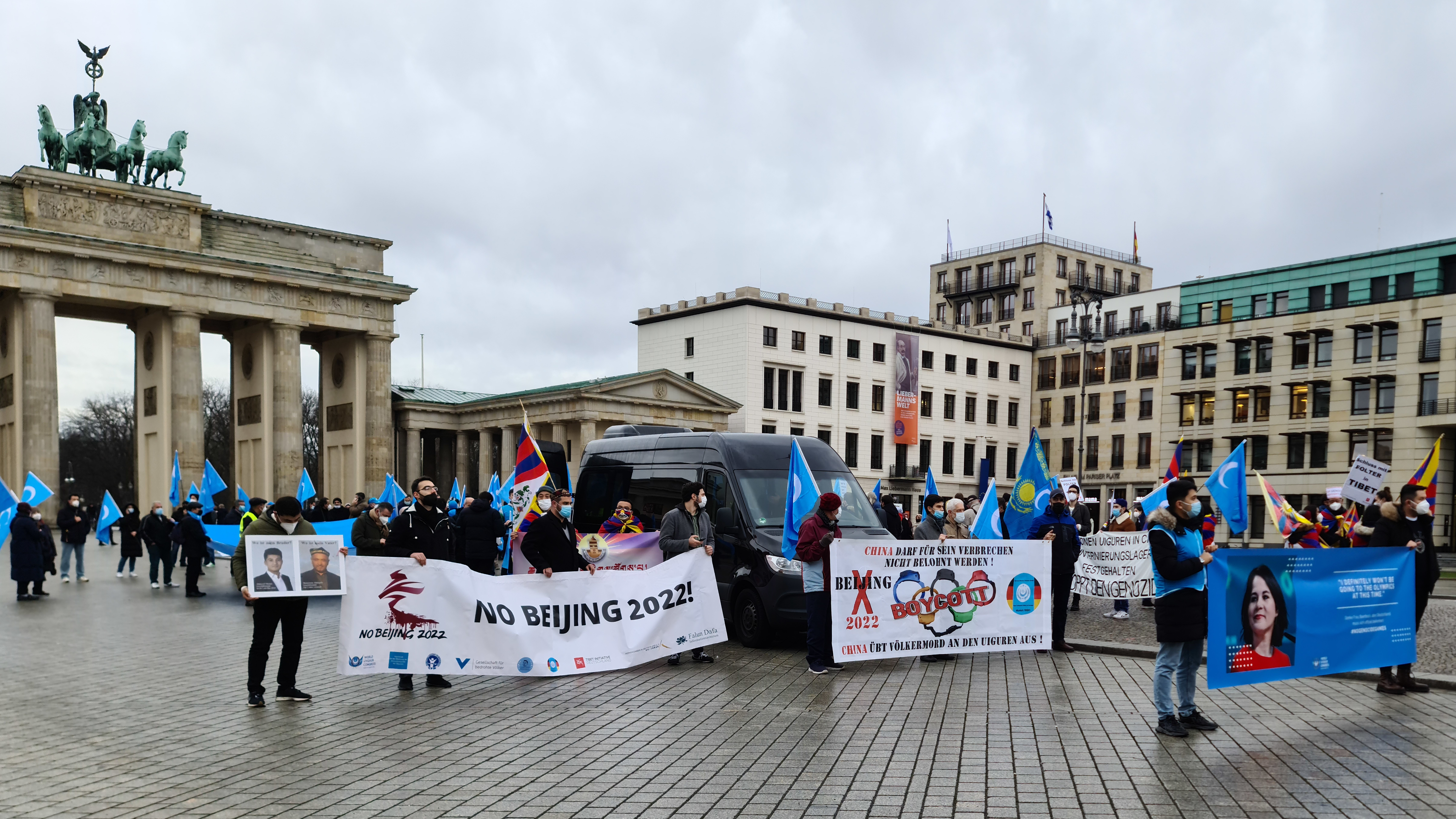
Demonstration of Tibetans and Uyghurs in front of the Brandenburg Gate in Berlin against the Olympic Games in Beijing 2022

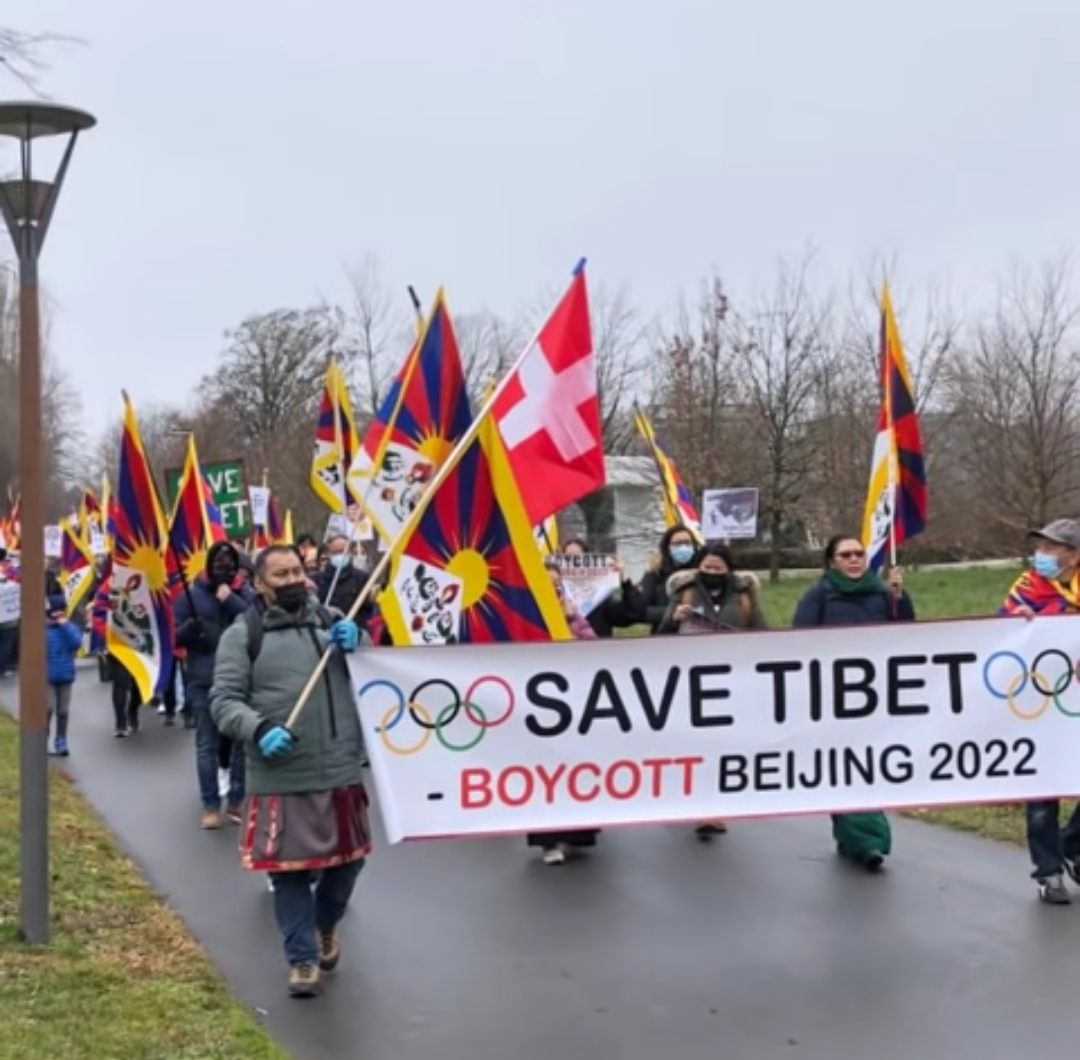
Protest by Tibetan independence groups against Chinese Winter Olympics (2022) held in Lausanne at the headquarters of the IOC

During the bidding process, critics questioned the Beijing bid, arguing that the proposed outdoor venue sites do not have reliable snowfall in winter for snow sports. Concerns have been raised that snow may need to be transported to the venues at great cost and with uncertain environmental consequences.

Additional concerns about weather conditions were raised during certain events. Swedish athlete Frida Karlsson nearly collapsed after the women's skiathlon due to low temperatures. Afterwards, the Swedes considered putting in a request for races to be moved to earlier in the day, stating that the afternoons and early evenings scheduled for European TV audiences were hurting the performance of the athletes.

As in 2008, activists, human rights groups, and diplomats made calls to boycott the Olympic Games when hosted by China. In the aftermath of the 2019 leak of the Xinjiang papers, the 2019–2020 Hong Kong protests, and the persecution of Uyghurs in China, calls were made for a boycott of the 2022 Games. Because of these issues, the selection of an athlete from Xinjiang as part of the final torchbearers received a mixed reaction.

In February 2021, the Chinese Communist Party-owned tabloid Global Times warned that China could "seriously sanction any country that follows a boycott." In March 2021, Chinese spokesperson Guo Weimin stated that any attempt to boycott the Olympics would be doomed to fail. China's Foreign Minister Wang Yi also told the EU's foreign policy chief Josep Borrell that they should attend the games to "enhance exchanges on winter sport", and to "foster new highlights" in bilateral cooperation.

The IOC stated that it remains neutral in all global political issues and that the award of hosting the games does not signal agreement with the host country's political or social situation or its human rights standards. The committee's response to Agence France-Presse read: "We've repeatedly said it: the IOC isn't responsible for the government. It only gives the rights and opportunity for the staging of the Olympic Games. That doesn't mean we agree with all the politics, all the social or human rights issues in the country. And it doesn't mean we approve of all the human rights violations of a person or people." The statement attracted criticism, with Pacific University professor Jules Boykoff accusing the IOC of "hypocrisy".

On 19 November 2021, a group of 17 members of the Lithuanian national parliament Seimas released an official letter encouraging Lithuania to withdraw from the 2022 Winter Olympics due to human rights violations in China. On 3 December 2021, Lithuania was the first nation to announce a diplomatic boycott of the games.

After the Russian invasion of Ukraine in late February 2022, The New York Times published a report alleging that China requested Russia to delay the invasion until after the Olympics to avoid damaging the Games' public image. Russia invaded Ukraine just four days after the Games' Closing Ceremony. Liu Pengyu, spokesperson for the Chinese Embassy in Washington, has rejected the claims as "speculations without any basis, and intended to blame-shift and smear China".

=== American diplomatic boycott ===
The U.S. boycott of China's Winter Olympics was predominantly due to China's human rights issues on topics such as the systematic oppression of the Uyghurs, Tibetans and the protests in Hong Kong in 2019. The Chinese government implemented many coercive activities in those regions, such as the re-education camps, mass detention camps of allegedly over a million Uyghurs, and restricted access to social media.

==== Key event timeline ====
In October 2018, American senator Marco Rubio, Senator Jeff Merkley, and Congressmen Jim McGovern and Chris Smith sent a letter, on behalf of the Congressional-Executive Commission on China (CECC), to the International Olympic Committee (IOC) requesting the revocation of China's host right on the 2022 Winter Olympics. The letter stated that "no Olympics should be held in a country whose government is committing genocide and crimes against humanity."

In November 2021, President Biden proposed "a diplomatic boycott of the 2022 Beijing Winter Olympics." The U.S. was aware of the prospective harsh punishment of being suspended by the National Olympic Committee and was careful regarding the scale and severity of the boycott.

In December 2021, the Biden administration officially initiated a diplomatic boycott of the Beijing 2022 Winter Olympics, restricting U.S. government officials' presence at the games. The attendance of Team USA athletes was not affected by the diplomatic boycott.

==== Reactions ====
The IOC remained relatively neutral regarding the letter from CECC or the boycott. The IOC negotiated with the Chinese government on specific protocols to ensure the Olympic Games ran smoothly, such as providing unrestricted internet access to foreign journalists.

From China's perspective, the U.S.was "politicizing sports" with the Biden administration's boycott of the 2022 Beijing Winter Olympics. The Chinese Ministry of Foreign Affairs spokesperson, Zhao Lijian, accused the U.S. of violating the spirit of political neutrality endorsed in the Olympic Charter, emphasising that an Olympic game should not be a place for political posturing and manipulation. China announced that the U.S. was not yet officially invited by the host committee; thus, the U.S. should not have initiated the boycott in the first place.

Following the U.S.'s announcement of a diplomatic boycott, a number of countries, including Britain, Australia, Canada, Belgium, Denmark, Lithuania, India, Estonia, and Kosovo, also participated. Meanwhile, Austria, Latvia, Slovenia, Sweden, and the Netherlands opted not to send government officials to the event but did not explicitly cite human rights concerns. Instead, they attributed their decisions to factors such as COVID-19 precautions. However, several U.S. allies, including South Korea, Germany, Italy, and France, did not join the boycott.

Unlike the U.S. and other boycotting countries, the Japanese government did not use the term "diplomatic boycott" but announced it would not send any senior officials or Cabinet ministers. Japanese Olympic and Paralympic Committee leaders, along with senior lawmaker Seiko Hashimoto, however attended in non-governmental capacities. China welcomed the representatives, and Tokyo's decision was seen as a compromise to balance domestic and international considerations, including appeasing conservative lawmakers and allies in Washington.

==== Effect during the Games ====
According to analysis by CNN's Beijing Bureau, no athletes or attendees publicly protested China's human rights record during the Games. Susan Brownell, a scholar of Chinese sports and the Olympics at the University of Missouri–St. Louis, said, "You can't write stories about people who aren't in Beijing - that's the problem with the diplomatic boycott. There's no story once the Games start." She added that she had anticipated political controversies would fade into the background as sporting events took prominence, which she notes what "has largely happened."

=== Environmental impact ===
An estimated 49 million US gallons (190,000,000 L; 41,000,000 imp gal) of water was expected to be used to create snow at the various venues. Pyeongchang, South Korea, which held the previous Winter Olympics, also had a cold but similarly arid climate that required vast quantities of artificial snow. Professor Carmen de Jong, a geographer at the University of Strasbourg, argued that these would be the "most unsustainable" Winter Olympics in history. The IOC stated that "a series of water-conserving and recycling designs have been put into place to optimise water usage for snowmaking, human consumption, and other purposes.

Artificial snow forms a harder piste compared to real snow. It is often favoured by professionals for being fast and "hyper-grippy" but also raises their fear of falling on it. American snowboarder Jamie Anderson compared it to "pretty bulletproof ice" while her teammate Courtney Rummel compared it to the man-made snow in Wisconsin.

According to Jules Boykoff in February 2022, Beijing's electricity came largely from coal and this coal power was what supported the construction of some Olympic venues. To offset emissions from construction and air travel, China had planted roughly 60M trees.

=== Sporting controversies ===
There were concerns about decisions and disqualification in several events during the games. These issues included the following:

- An official appeal to the Court of Arbitration for Sport over the disqualification of two South Korean athletes from the men's 1000 metres short track speed skating event was filed by the Korean Sport & Olympic Committee after having their protests rejected by the International Skating Union.
- Controversy surrounding a ruling of an obstruction in the 5000 metres relay event.
- A potential missed call by judges during the men's snowboard slopestyle and men's half pipe event events.
- A ruling of a false start in the men's 500 metres speed skating event.
- The disqualification of racers for their uniforms during the mixed team normal hill event of ski jumping.
- The continued participation of the figure skater Kamila Valieva in the women's singles competition after a preliminary positive drug test from a sample two months prior.
- Three athletes failed the doping test during the Olympics and were suspended: Iranian alpine skier Hossein Saveh-Shemshaki, Ukrainian cross-country skier Valiantsina Kaminskaya, and Ukrainian bobsledder Lidiia Hunko. The positive test of the Spanish figure skater Laura Barquero was announced after the Olympics.
- U.S. skater Joey Mantia alleged that South Korean skater Lee Seung-hoon made contact with him and pulled him back, preventing him from winning a bronze medal in the Mass Start final. Mantia lost by a 0.002-second margin. Team USA challenged the result, but Lee was awarded the bronze medal.

=== Athlete and officials complaints ===
The food and overall conditions in quarantine hotels given to athletes testing positive for COVID-19 were criticised early on. Team officials from delegations including Belgium, Germany, Poland, Finland and the Russian Olympic Committee all brought up issues their athletes faced in quarantine hotels, among them were the lack of internet connections, low-quality food, insufficient facilities and no training equipment.

With China's Zero-COVID policy, there were issues raised about the process of quarantine at the games. On 2 February, Belgian skeleton athlete Kim Meylemans posted on social media and was in tears about the conditions she faced while in quarantine. According to Newsweek and Time, the hotels' conditions appeared to have improved after the athletes' complaints were made public.

There were some complaints about the food served outside of quarantine. Germany's alpine coach Christian Schweiger called the catering "extremely questionable" for not having hot meals but he echoed athletes from several nations that the food at the nearby Athletes' Village was great. The U.S. and South Korean teams elected to bring their own food. Austrian skier Matthias Mayer said that Kitzbuehel would have offered "the best of the best" but also that a hot meal right before a race might not bring out top performances.

Other complaints included low temperatures and related safety concerns. Sweden's Frida Karlsson nearly collapsed at the conclusion of the women's skiathlon cross-country race. Afterwards, her team considered requesting that races held in afternoons and evenings for European TV audiences be moved to earlier during the day. Some athletes resorted to putting tape on their faces and noses to protect them from the bitter cold. Heavy snowfall disrupted a number of competition and training events on 13 February. Thirty-three skiers did not finish their first run of the men's giant slalom. Henrik Kristoffersen of Norway said that he "couldn't see shit." Switzerland's Loic Meillard said, "It's not what I was hoping for but it's part of the game ... we've raced in conditions like that before."

== See also ==
- 2022 Winter Paralympics
- Olympic Games held in China
  - 2008 Summer Olympics – Multi-sport event in Beijing, China
  - 2014 Summer Youth Olympics – Multi-sport event in Nanjing, China
- List of IOC country codes
- List of Olympic Games boycotts

== Notes ==
Winter Olympics
Preceded by Pyeongchang	XXIV Olympic Winter Games; Beijing; 2022	Succeeded by Milan-Cortina d'Ampezzo
