= Oslo bid for the 2022 Winter Olympics =

Bids for the 2022 Winter Olympics and Paralympics
Overview
- XXIV Olympic Winter Games; XIII Paralympic Winter Games

Details
- City: Oslo, Norway
- Chair: Stian Berger Røsland (President); Eli Grimsby (CEO)
- NOC: Norwegian Olympic and Paralympic Committee and Confederation of Sports (NOR)

Previous Games hosted
- Hosted the 1952 Winter Olympics

Oslo 2022 Winter Olympics was a campaign by the private organization Norwegian Olympic and Paralympic Committee and Confederation of Sports for the right to host the 2022 Winter Olympics in Oslo, although in Norway it was primarily viewed as an application by the Olympic movement for government funding of an Olympic Games that would ultimately be decided by the Norwegian Parliament. The Olympic organisations had already indicated a strong desire that Norway would host the games and provide the necessary funding. Oslo was described as the clear favourite to host the games in international media and was widely expected to be awarded the games, provided that the Norwegian Parliament granted the necessary funding.

Public opinion was strongly against granting government funding to an Olympics after a series of demands by the International Olympic Committee for luxury treatment of the committee members themselves were revealed in Norwegian media. The demands included special lanes on roads only to be used by IOC members and cocktail reception at the Royal Palace with drinks paid for by the royal family. The IOC also "demanded control over all advertising space throughout Oslo" to be used exclusively by IOC's sponsors, something that is not possible in Norway because Norway is a liberal democracy where the government doesn't own or control "all advertising space throughout Oslo" and has no authority to give a foreign private organization exclusive use of a city and the private property within it. Several commentators pointed out that such demands were unheard of in a western democracy; Slate described the IOC as a "notoriously ridiculous organization run by grifters and hereditary aristocrats."

The Olympic movement's bid for government funding was cancelled on October 1, 2014, after the parliamentary caucus of the Conservative Party had voted to decline the application for funding. Already, the Progress Party, Centre Party and Socialist Left Party were opposed to the bid. Thus, it was no longer possible to get a parliamentary majority for a state guarantee. Ole Berget, deputy minister in the Finance Ministry, said "the IOC's arrogance was an argument held high by a lot of people." The country's largest newspaper commented that "Norway is a rich country, but we don't want to spend money on wrong things, like satisfying the crazy demands from IOC apparatchiks. These insane demands that they should be treated like the king of Saudi Arabia just won't fly with the Norwegian public."

The IOC selected Beijing as the host city for the 2022 Winter Olympics from the two remaining bids at the 128th IOC Session in Kuala Lumpur, Malaysia on July 31, 2015.

== Background ==
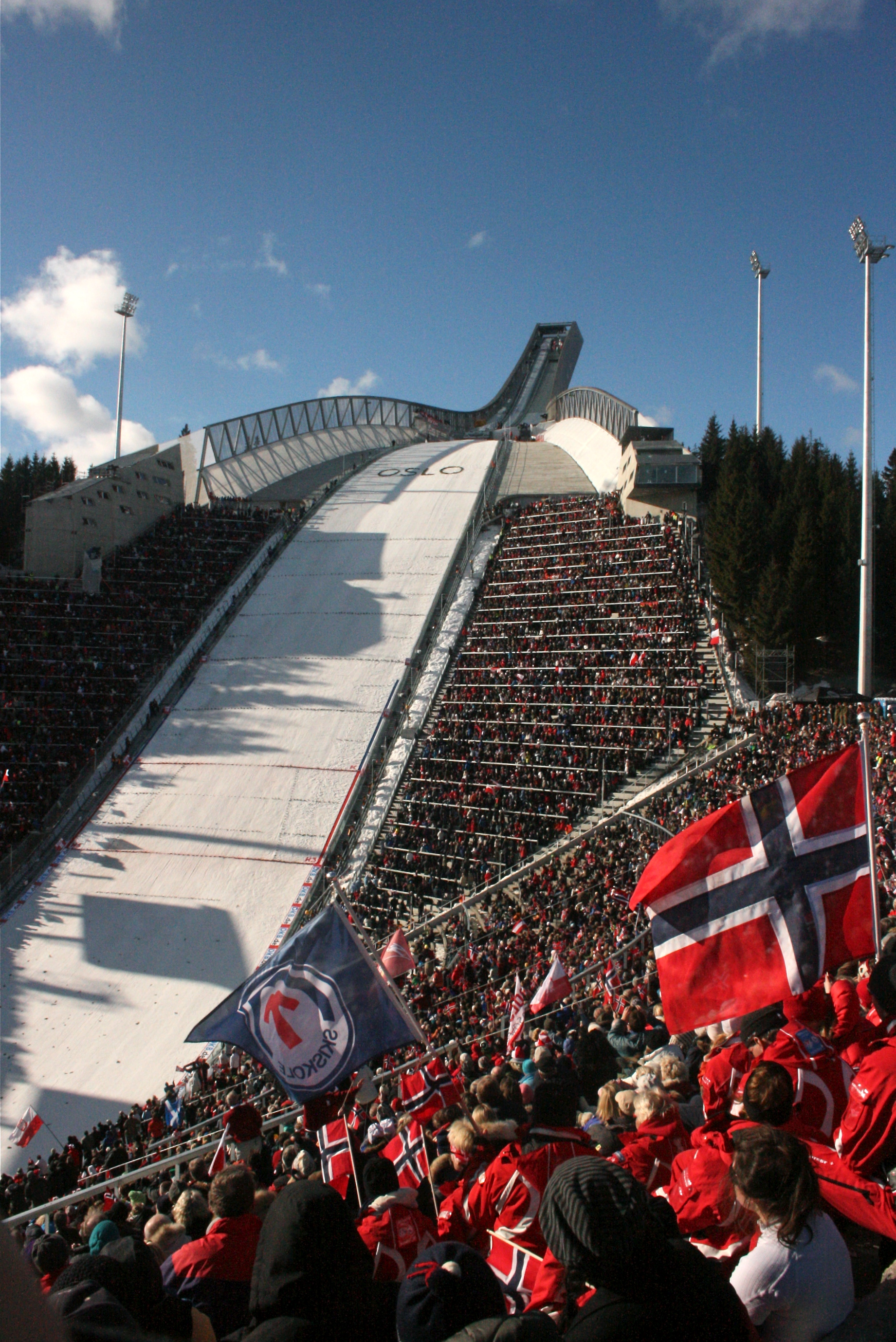
Holmenkollbakken, Oslo

The Norwegian Olympic and Paralympic Committee and Confederation of Sports, a private organization, originally planned a bid for the 2018 Winter Olympics. Three cities announced interest: Tromsø, Trondheim and Oslo. After assessing the plans and a technical evaluation, the NOC board voted 7–6 in favor of Tromsø. However, 30 September 2008 an external revision demonstrated the games would cost far more than originally suggested, the total public net cost being estimated at 19,1 billions NOK. This prompted the Norwegian Olympic Committee to withdraw the bid 6 October 2008, citing inter alia responsibility to avoid unwarranted public spending. The decision caused strong negative reactions. Then board member and later president, Børre Rognlien, recognized in 2014 that citing responsibility of public spending was unwise.

In January 2010, Gerhard Heiberg, IOC member from Norway, announced that the IOC would welcome a bid from Norway to host the Winter Olympic Games. Lillehammer, host of the 1994 Winter Olympics, and the area Stavanger-Bergen-Voss were considered contenders. Tromsø also showed interest. However, Oslo was selected without much public deliberation in October 2011 after the seven major winter sports organizations decided to back the capital. There were negative reactions from several supporters of the Tromsø 2018 bid. MP Anne Marit Bjørnflaten suggested that Tromsø 2018 was cancelled not due to timing or costs, but geography. On 9 June 2012, the annual assembly of the Norwegian Confederation of Sports voted in favor of the Oslo 2022 bid with a majority of 142–15.

Oslo City Council decided to hold a local public referendum on whether or not the city would move forward with the bid. This was held in Oslo on 9 September 2013. The bid was supported by a majority of 55%. Around the same time, the Socialist Left decided not to back the bid, the first political party to adopt a position on a national level.

== Application for state funding and financial guarantee ==
The pivotal issue in pushing the bid forward was obtaining state funding and an unlimited state financial guarantee, as required by the Olympic Charter. 19 June 2013, the Norwegian Olympic Committee and Oslo had put forward their application for funding and guarantee to the Ministry of Culture (Norway). Eventually the cabinet would have to present the issue to the Norwegian parliament, Storting, as the constitution gives the parliament power of the budget. The application for state funding was put through a legally required quality assurance review. DNV GL conducted the assessment. On December 20, 2013, they presented their conclusion in which they concluded that the bid was without significant weaknesses, and that the public net costs would probably end on 21,7 billion NOK, and with 85% certainty below 25,8 billion NOK. The next step following the review of DNV GL was to have the Ministry of Culture forward the application to the parliament. Before this was executed, the bid had been withdrawn.

== Applicant city phase ==
On 12 November 2013, Oslo sent their formal letter to be an "applicant city" in the bidding for the 2022 games. Oslo was joined by five other cities: Beijing, Almaty, Stockholm, Kraków and Lviv. However, Stockholm dropped out of the race two months later due to lack of local political support.

Børre Rognlien had initially stated that the Norwegian Olympic Committee required public support of 60% of the population to move forward with the bid. This was also presented as a requirement from IOC. However, building public support proved hard. Just prior to the 2014 Winter Olympics in Sochi, support was lagging at 38%. Despite being a success for Norway in terms of medals, the Sochi games presented a further hit to the Oslo bid. Controversies around the IOC reprimanding the Norwegian cross country skiers for wearing mourning bands, as well as general criticism concerning costs and other issues, made support drop even further. Shortly after Sochi, a poll suggested that support had dropped to 32.6%.

On 9 March 2014, former leader of the Norwegian Confederation of Sports Hans B. Skaset explained how the Olympic Charter secured IOC control of the event, while leaving the financial risk with the host city. The minister of culture, Thorhild Widvey, responded by declaring that the Norwegian government would reserve itself against the relevant provisions of the Olympic Charter. Oslo sent the candidate application file on 14 March 2014. Widvey did not – as the IOC requires – provide a full guarantee of respect for the Olympic Charter. Instead, Widvey wrote that their guarantee should "not be understood to mean that the Government has agreed to comply with all provisions of the Olympic Charter". However, this was withdrawn by the end of April after a short exchange of letters with the IOC, who rejected such a reservation.

4 May 2014, the Progress Party (junior coalition partner in government) voted no to provide a state financial guarantee for the Olympic bid at their annual conference. Prime Minister Erna Solberg declared the following day that this did not affect the government's assessment of whether or not to support the bid. In response to the decision of the Progress Party, Thorhild Widvey went public with her support of the bid on 15 May 2014. By summer, two other applicant cities (Kraków and Lviv) had withdrawn their bids, leaving Oslo, Beijing and Almaty as the only applicant cities.

== Candidate city phase and rejection of the Olympic organizations' application ==
Oslo, Beijing and Almaty were accepted as Candidate Cities by the IOC on 7 July 2014. The IOC's working group report gave Oslo the highest technical ratings of the three cities. The Norwegian capital led in eight of the 14 categories and was tied with Beijing in three.

With pollings in June 2014 running as low as 29% and 24%, the requirement of 60% support, which Børre Rognlien had previously set, was retracted. During the summer, the bid was able to gain backing from key public figures: the leader of the Norwegian Confederation of Trade Unions, Gerd Kristiansen, as well as the leader of the Confederation of Norwegian Enterprise, Kristin Skogen Lund, both went public with their support of the bid. Oslo 2022 was also supported by the Norwegian Young Conservatives. However, the youth divisions of the other seven major political parties opposed the bid.

Thorhild Widvey had not informed the public that the reservation towards the Olympic Charter had been withdrawn, but this became known at the beginning of August, causing considerable adverse reactions. On 4 September 2014, in an attempt to drum up support both in public and in parliament, Oslo 2022 presented a cheaper option for hosting the Games, which would reduce the net cost to the public purse from 21.7 billion NOK to 17.4 billion NOK. However, Oslo 2022 were still standing by their original proposal and recommendations.

As an alleged strategic move to establish a "yes" vote in the caucus of the Conservative Party, to facilitate the cabinet in supporting the bid, the caucus elected to discuss the bid in early October, prior to the cabinet taking a position. According to several media sources, the parliamentary caucus had a solid majority in favour of the bid at this point. However, in the last couple of days leading up to the deliberation in the Conservative Party, there was a series of negative developments for the bid, including: the Centre Party saying "no" through a grass root vote; a poll showing that even within the Norwegian Confederation of Sports, the majority of members opposed the bid; and an external revision which clarified that the revised cheaper budget was unrealistic. The most damaging development was the public scrutiny of the IOC's 7000 pages of requirements. An exposé by the Norwegian tabloid Verdens Gang allegedly revealed extravagant hospitality demands made by the IOC. They included a cocktail reception with the royal family with drinks paid for by them or the organising committee, the provision of road lanes exclusively for use by IOC members, and priority treatment at airports and hotels being used by IOC members. IOC also "demanded control over all advertising space throughout Oslo" to be used exclusively by IOC's sponsors, something that is not possible in Norway because Norway is a liberal democracy where the government doesn't own or control "all advertising space throughout Oslo" much of which is privately owned and has no authority to give a foreign private organization exclusive use of an entire city and private property within it. Several commentators pointed out that such demands were unheard of in a western democracy, while Slate described them as being "diva-like".

The discussions of the caucus were held in private, after which the parliamentary leader Trond Helleland explained that the caucus was divided roughly down the middle. The conclusion of the caucus was that this was not an adequate basis for moving forward with the bid, hence their recommendation to the cabinet was to reject the application for a state guarantee and state funding. Various members of the Conservative Party cited lack of public support and enthusiasm, high costs and unreasonable IOC demands as the main reasons for the caucus' negative decision. The conclusion meant that a majority of the members of parliament were now opposed to the bid, leading Oslo 2022 to withdraw its application for state funding and financial guarantee. No single party had supported the bid at the national level, but the Labour Party (Norway), Liberal Party (Norway) and Christian Democratic Party (Norway) remained undecided throughout the process.

== Aftermath ==
Immediately following the bid withdrawal, IOC released a statement on Oslo 2022 calling it a "missed opportunity" for Norway. The statement also included strong criticism of the bid leadership and government, claiming that "neither a senior member of the bid team nor a government official" attended a meeting held by IOC to clarify important issues concerning the games. IOC claimed "senior politicians in Norway appear not to have been properly briefed on the process and were left to take their decisions on the basis of half-truths and factual inaccuracies". Bid chair Stian Berger Røsland rejected these claims, calling IOC "arrogant". Thorhild Widvey dubbed the IOC claims as "very sensational", stating that the IOCs claims were not genuine. "We have not been invited to a meeting", Widvey added. Conservative MP Svein Harberg, a prominent supporter of the bid, commented the attack from IOC stating "I was quite shocked about this at first (...) I was angry when I looked at it. But now I realize that it just shows we made the right decision."

The Oslo City Council was presented with an evaluation of the bid process December 2014. CEO of Oslo 2022, Eli Grimsby, presented the evaluation with the main conclusion that the distance between the spirit of the Norwegian people and the Olympic movement was too large. Grimsby further stated that the major challenges were in connection with the Host City Contract, which she labelled unbalanced, and as putting too much a burden on the host city. The Norwegian Confederation of Sports also initiated an evaluation on its own. The results were presented 25 March 2015. The evaluation concluded among other things that the bid suffered from poor communication, bad organization, and lack of support on the grass root level of the sporting confederation.

The DOSB also criticized the withdrawal of candidacy with the following statement:

"We regret that Oslo is no longer eligible for the 2022 Winter Olympics. The city, with its great winter sports tradition, had what we think was a convincing and sustainable concept. With the decision, another excellent candidate for the 2022 Winter Olympics will be lost. Now we are relying on the reform process within the framework of the Olympic Agenda 2020."

== Technical details of the bid ==
=== Financial details ===
In the application for state funding and financial guarantee, Oslo 2022 calculated gross total costs at 33,7 billion NOK. The external quality control review increased the estimate to up to 35,1 billion NOK with 50% certainty, and up to 41,0 billion NOK with 85% certainty. Those numbers may not accurately reflect what would have been the final number. Generally, the Norwegian quality control system have shown a bias at underestimating costs. In addition, a study at Saïd Business School showed that the Olympics had a 100 percent consistency of cost overruns in the period 1960–2012, with the average cost overrun in real terms at 179%. In the period 1999–2012, the average cost overrun is lower, in real terms at 47%.

The 21,7 billion net cost was based on 7 700 million NOK in income, and a total of 29 360 million NOK in public expenditure. The public expenditure included an organizational budget for the organizational committee of 17 510 million NOK, of which 2 800 million NOK was costs of renting the olympic village, media center and media village. 5 070 million NOK were budgeted spent on construction investment. 2 050 million NOK were budgeted in non-organization committee operational costs. 1 330 million NOK were budgeted to cover wage increases, while 3 420 million NOK were set aside to cover uncertainty of cost overruns.

DNV GL also conducted a socio-economical assessment, concluding that for the economy overall the games overall led to a negative net result of 15 890 million NOK in monetary terms. Of the positive non-monetary effects, enjoyable events and the predicted nationwide enthusiasm was considered the most significant. Non-monetary effects aside, the games would leave a legacy with a socio-economical worth of 2,45 billion NOK. This included mainly sporting venues (1 100 million NOK), infrastructure improvement (510 million NOK) and investment in security equipment (660 million NOK). Aside from the legacy, the difference between the public net cost of 21,7 billion NOK and the overall negative net result of 15,89 billion NOK consisted mainly of discounting the future cost to present value (3 930 million NOK) and positive effects for the tourism industry valued at 1 780 million NOK. The review considered the socio-economic costs of tax financing the event to 3 000 million NOK. The effects for the tourism industry were contested in the public debate, as research gives little support of a correlation between hosting the olympics and increased tourism. In the socio-economical assessment, the quality control review removed an alleged 4,9 billion NOK in positive effects of improved health in the population, finding no basis for the claim that hosting the olympics increases physical activity in the population.

=== Venues ===
The Oslo 2022 proposal included existing venues around Oslo itself, with a goal of hosting as many events as possible, including snow events, within Oslo's city limits. Certain Alpine events would be held in Lillehammer, which had hosted the 1994 Winter Olympics. Several new venues would also be constructed, and Valle Hovin would be renovated into an indoor arena. The following is the list of proposed venues for both the "Oslo Zone" and "Lillehammer Zone".

Oslo Area

- Wyllerløypa – snowboarding
- Grefsenkollen – freestyle, snowboarding
- New arena in Stubberud – ice hockey
- Jordal Amfi – ice hockey
- Valle Hovin (renovated) – speed skating
- New arena in Lørenskog – curling
- Telenor Arena – figure skating and short track
- Holmenkollen – Nordic skiing
- Grønmo/Huken – biathlon

Lillehammer Area

- Kvitfjell – alpine skiing
- Hafjell – alpine skiing
- Hunderfossen – bobsleigh, luge, skeleton

=== Accommodation ===
IOC requires 23,300 beds for accredited people (such as participants, leaders, journalists). This requirement is a little more than the hotel overall capacity of Oslo, Lillehammer and their surrounding areas. Since spectators and other Olympic-related visitors would have to be accommodated, more rooms would be needed. As a result, there were plans to arrange for there to be at least 3,000 additional temporary beds for visitors.

=== Transport ===
Olympic visitors would arrive at Oslo Airport, which receives intercontinental flights. Road and rail connections to all venues in the Lillehammer area would be provided, including a four-lane motorway between Oslo and Lillehammer (route E6).

== Previous bids ==
Oslo bid to host the 1932 and 1944 Winter Olympics but lost to Lake Placid and Cortina d'Ampezzo respectively (the 1944 games were cancelled because of World War II). Oslo went on to successfully bid to host the 1952 Winter Olympics. The city later bid to host the 1968 Winter Olympics but lost to Grenoble.

=== Previous bids from other Norwegian cities ===
Lillehammer bid to host the 1992 Winter Olympics but lost to Albertville. Lillehammer successfully bid to host the 1994 Winter Olympics. The city also bid to host the 2012 Winter Youth Olympics but failed to become a candidate (the games were ultimately awarded to Innsbruck). Lillehammer went on to submit an uncontested bid for the 2016 Winter Youth Olympics.
