= Jordal Idrettspark =

Multi-sports complex in Oslo, Norway

Jordal Amfi
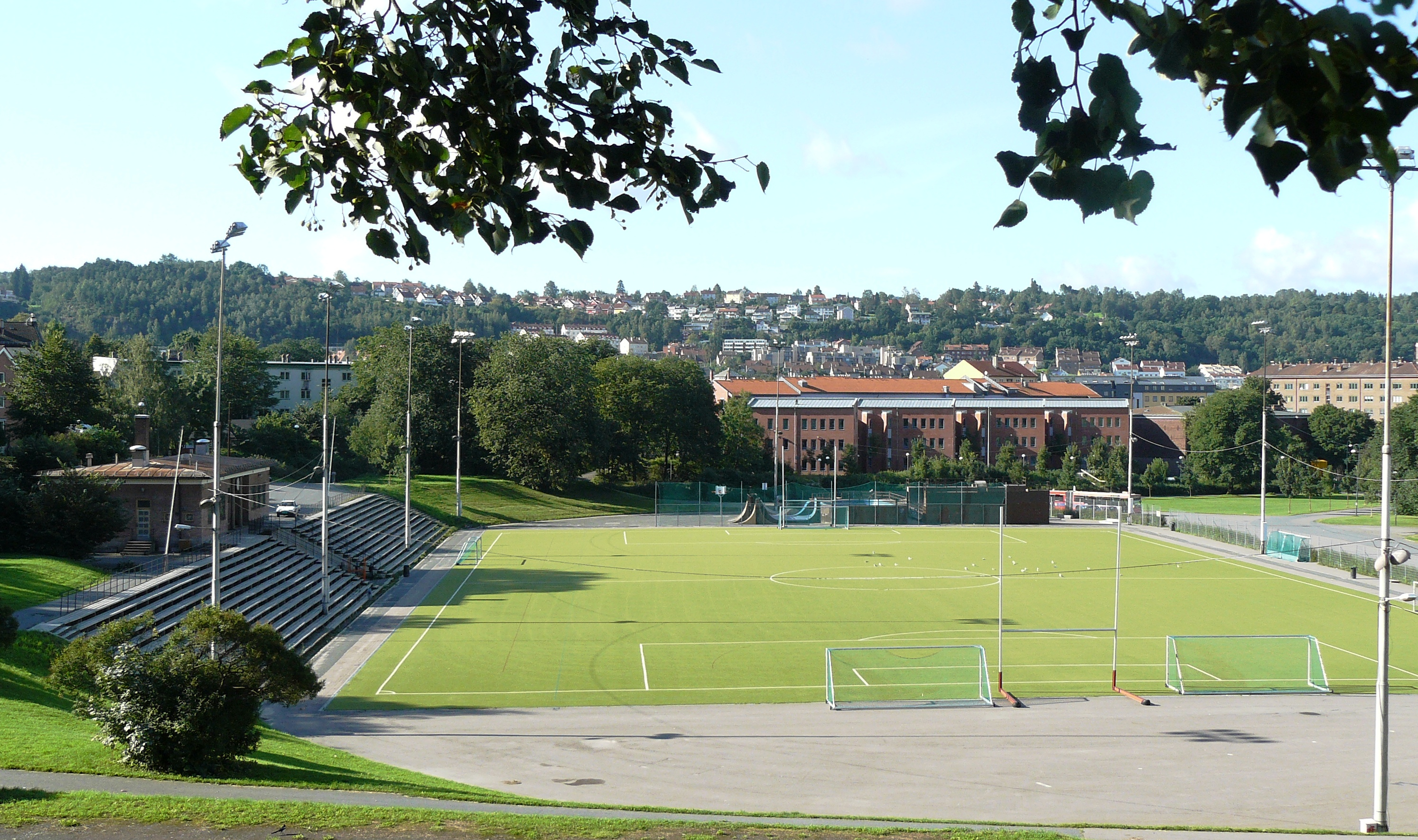
- Interactive map of Jordal Amfi
- Location: Jordal, Oslo, Norway
- Coordinates: 59°54′40.42″N 10°47′2.19″E
- Owner: Oslo Municipality
- Surface: Artificial turf

Construction
- Groundbreaking: 1930
- Opened: 1936

Tenants
- Jordal IF; Vålerenga Ishockey; Vålerenga Trolls

Jordal Idrettspark is a multi-sports complex located at Jordal in Oslo, Norway. Owned by Oslo Municipality, its main tenant is Vålerengens IF. The main components are two ice hockey rinks, Jordal Amfi and Ungdomshallen, and a football stadium, Jordal Stadion.

Jordal Stadion was built between 1930 and 1936. It is currently used for recreational football and American football, although it has previously also been used for speed skating. Jordal Amfi was built for ice hockey at the 1952 Winter Olympics and opened in 1951. The Vålerenga Trolls play American football at the stadium and Vålerenga Ishockey play in the amphitheater.

The track around the football stadium was formerly used for track and field. It was especially prominent in the Workers' Confederation of Sports (AIF), where it was used for national championships for AIF clubs, like Jordal IF. It also hosted the national Workers' Championships in race walking, 5000 metres, in 1937 and 1938. Since 1926, the road race walking events had also been staged from Jordal. After the Workers' Confederation of Sports became defunct, Jordal was also used as a national venue by the Norwegian Walking Association. The local multi-sports club was named Jordal IF.
