= Grefsen =

Neighbourhood in Oslo, Norway

Coordinates: 59°56′N 10°48′E

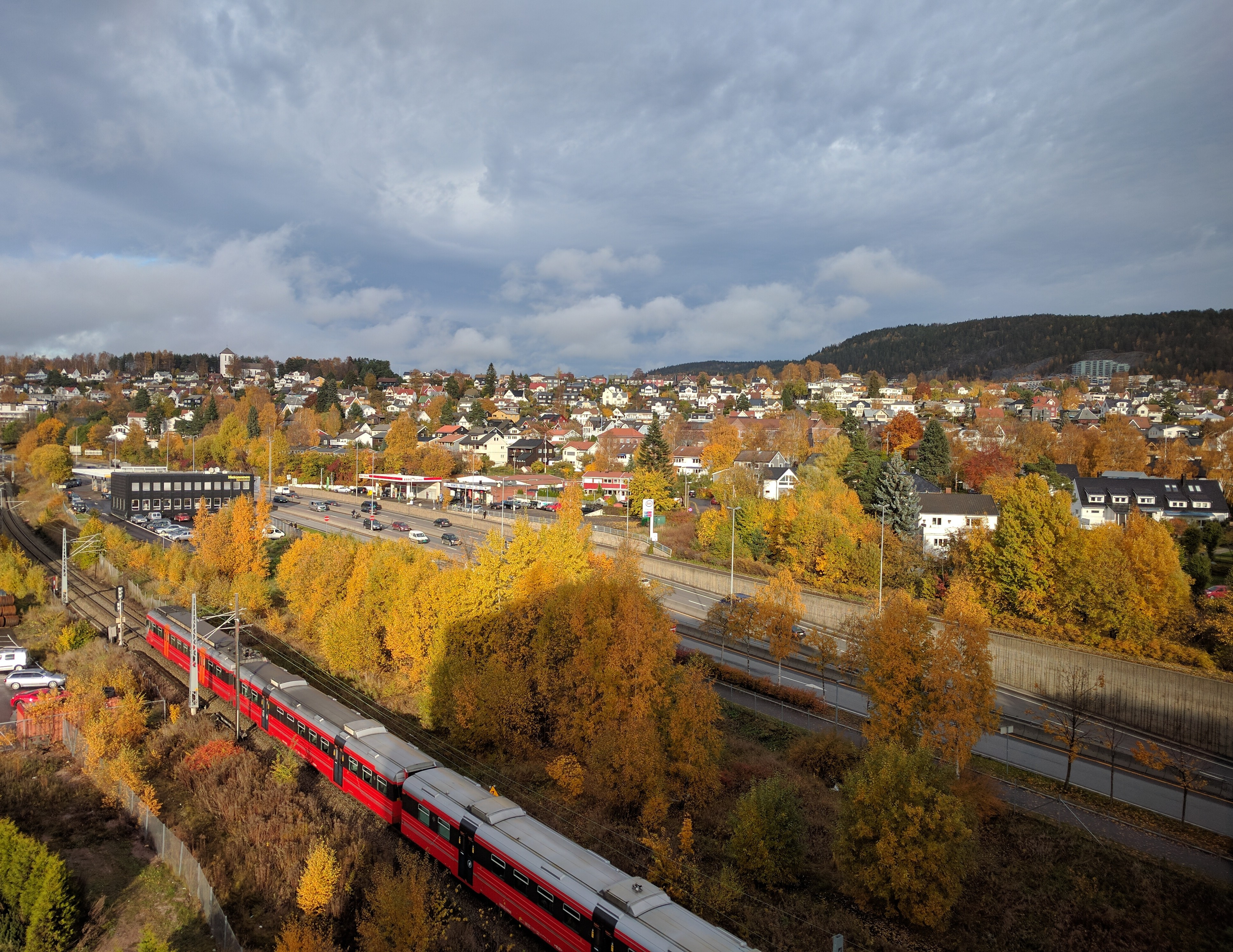
Grefsen is a neighborhood in the borough of Nordre Aker in Oslo

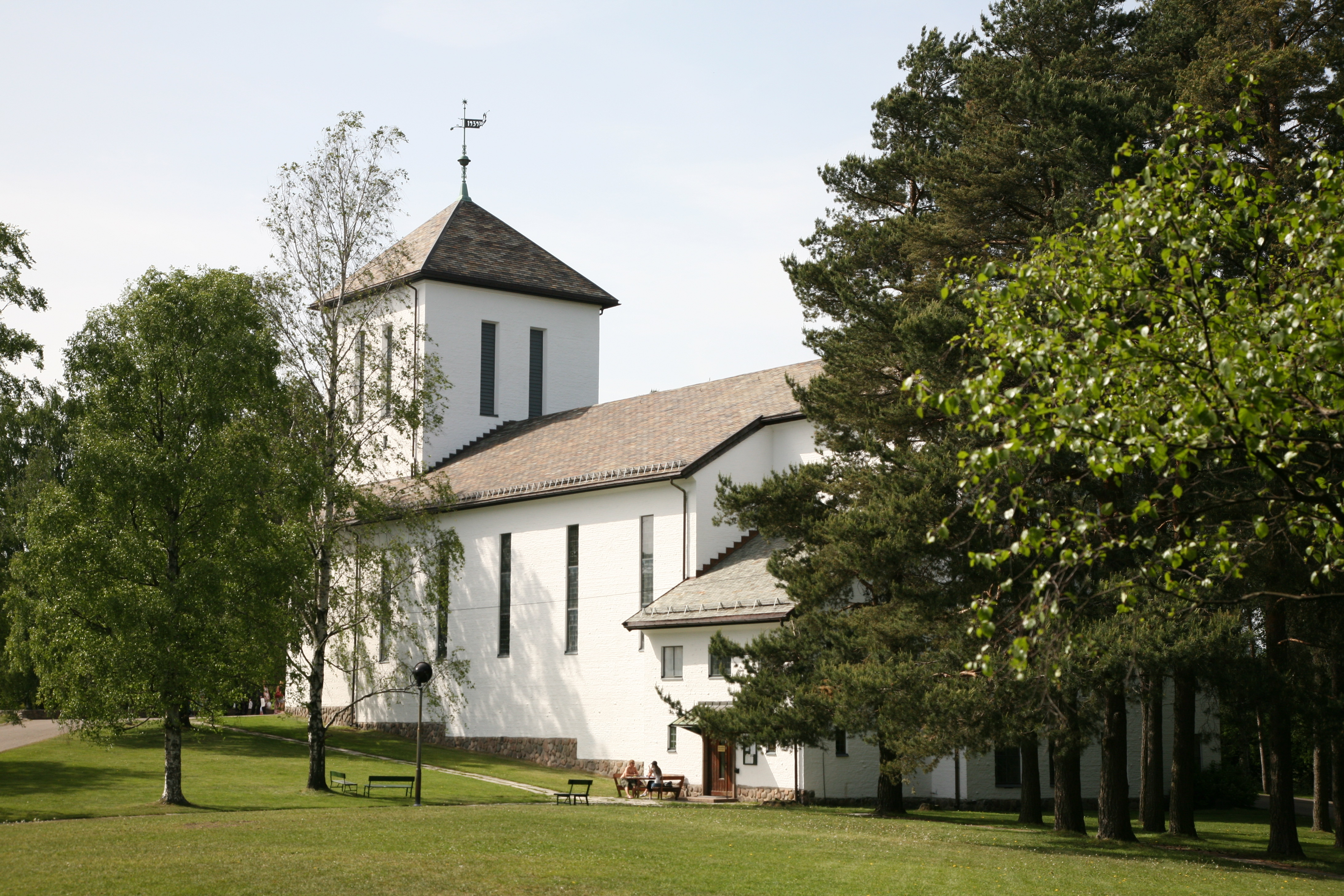
Grefsen Church

Grefsen is a neighbourhood in the city of Oslo, Norway.

Grefsen was a part of the municipality of Aker before the Second World War, later incorporated into Oslo. Together with Kjelsås, Grefsen then formed the borough Grefsen-Kjelsås until 1 January 2004, when they became part of the new borough of Nordre Aker.

The Gjøvik Railway Line goes through the area, but Grefsen Station is actually located closer to the neighbourhood of Disen. The Kjelsås tram line also runs through the area. Sporveien's main depot is also located here. The local sports field Grefsen stadion is the home field of Kjelsås IL.

Grefsen Church (Grefsen kirke) was consecrated in 1940.

== The name ==
The neighbourhood is named after the old farm Grefsen (Norse Grefsin, from Grefsvin). The first element is grefs 'steep hillside' (derived from the verb grafa 'dig (out)'), the last element is vin for 'meadow'. The old farm had Akerselva as its western border, and the hillside/riverside down to the river is very steep. The adjacent hill Grefsenåsen is named after the farm.

== Education ==
There are four schools in the area, Grefsen Elementary School (year 1–7), Engebråten Middle School (year 8–10), Morellbakken Middle School (year 8-10) and Nydalen High School (year 11–13). Nydalen High School was used to be named Grefsen High School until it was renovated and renamed in 2014.

== Notable people ==
- Peter Andreas Morell, campaigned for better education for Grefsen
- Jon Øigarden, Norwegian Actor grew up in Grefsen
