= Oslo bid for the 2018 Winter Olympics =

Bids for the 2018 Winter Olympics and Paralympics
Overview
- XXIII Olympic Winter Games; XII Paralympic Winter Games
- Winner: Pyeongchang; Runner-up: Munich; Shortlist: Annecy

Details
- City: Oslo, Norway
- NOC: Norwegian Olympic Committee

Previous Games hosted
- 1952 Winter Olympics (Oslo); 1994 Winter Olympics (Lillehammer)

Decision
- Result: Discarded by NOC

Oslo–Lillehammer 2018 was a proposal for Oslo and Lillehammer, Norway, to bid to host the 2018 Winter Olympics. Along with the Trondheim and Tromsø bids, it was one of three options for the Norwegian Olympic and Paralympic Committee and Confederation of Sports (NIF), who ultimately chose to not bid for the games. Oslo announced the bid in September 2006, and the official proposal report was published in February 2007.

Compared to the other Norwegian bids, Oslo–Lillehammer presented the best infrastructure, transport and accommodation. The bid called for using existing venues for Alpine, Nordic and freestyle skiing, snowboarding, curling and sliding sports, although new venues would need to be built for ice hockey and skating. Major existing venues which would be used included Holmenkollen National Arena, Tryvann Vinterpark and Jordal Amfi in Oslo, and Hafjell, Kvitfjell and Lillehammer Olympic Bobsleigh and Luge Track in the Lillehammer area. All venues would be accessible by rail, including most of the Oslo venues by the Oslo Metro. The main Olympic Village would be built in Bjørvika and the media center in Lohavn. The bid's major downside was the 240-kilometer (150 mi) distance between Oslo and Kvitfjell. The choice of those venues over Norefjell was subject to criticism and debate. Political support for Oslo was lower than for Tromsø, as the authorities prioritized regional policies in their support for candidates.

== Background ==
Norway has hosted two Winter Olympics, the 1952 Games in Oslo and the 1994 Games in Lillehammer. Oslo has applied four times previously to host the games, in 1932, 1944, 1952 and 1968. A proposal was also made for Oslo to bid for 1980, but the application was never sent. In 2002, the five municipalities that had hosted the 1994 Olympics stated their intent to apply for the 2014 Winter Olympics. They hoped a new Olympics would stimulate the Oppland and Hedmark region, and focused on the reuse of the existing venues. At the same time, officials from Oslo also stated that they intended to bid for the same or later games.

Ahead of the bids for the 2014 Winter Olympics, Tromsø launched a proposal. It was seen both as a possibility to develop Northern Norway, and a way to celebrate the bicentennial of the Constitution of Norway. The proposal was rejected by the Bondevik's Second Cabinet, who stated that there should be more than 20 years between each time Norway hosted the Olympics. They were also concerned about the costs of the project. The opposition supported the Tromsø bid, stated it was important for regional development. Gerhard Heiberg, Norway's representative in the International Olympic Committee (IOC), described the project as unrealistic and that a better application would be needed to compete with bids such as Sochi's. The application was finally dismissed by the NIF board in July 2005.

On 23 June 2006, the NIF board announced that they planned to apply for the 2018 Winter Olympics, and asked for bids from Norwegian cities wanting to host the games. Oslo city councilor Anette Wiig Bryn announced on 25 August that Oslo planned to bid for the 2018 Olympics. It was the third city to announce it would apply to become the Norwegian applicant for the games, after both Tromsø and Trondheim had previously made announcements. The planning was given a municipal grant of 6 million Norwegian krone (NOK). Oslo Mayor Per Ditlev-Simonsen stated that the Oslo bid would include Norefjell rather than the Lillehammer venues. The Oslo and Lillehammer cooperation was announced on 13 September.

== Venues and infrastructure ==
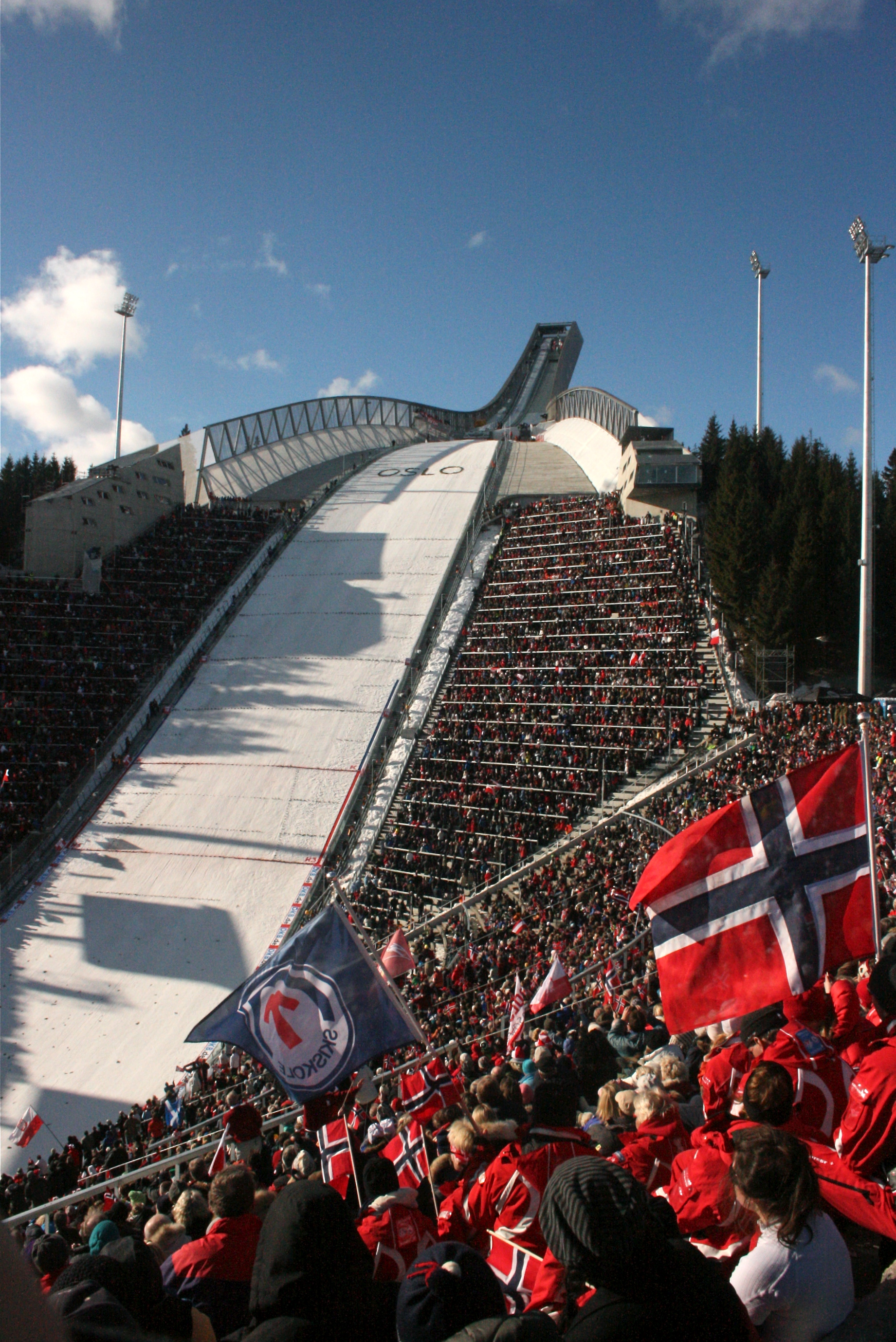
Holmenkollbakken was proposed to be used for ski jumping.

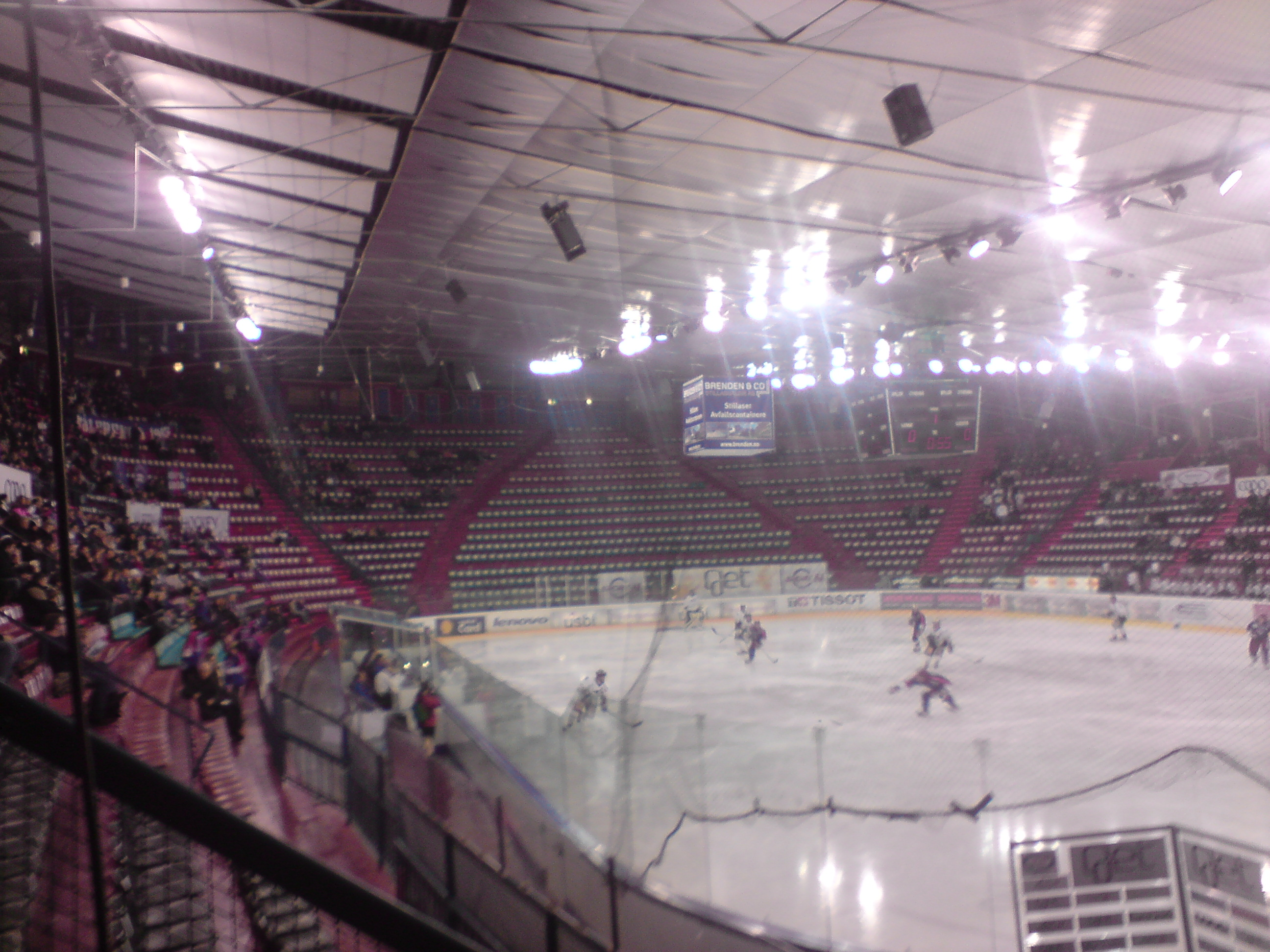
Jordal Amfi, then an outdoor rink, was used during the 1952 Olympics, and was proposed to be used for the curling events in 2018.

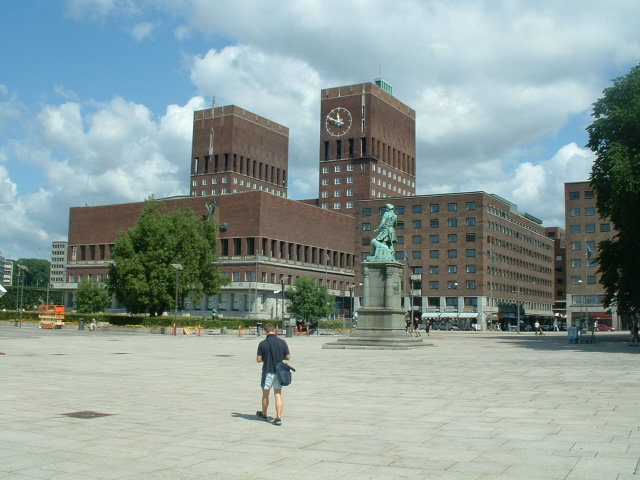
Rådhusplassen, with the Oslo City Hall in the background, was proposed as the venue for the opening, closing and medal ceremonies.

Holmenkollen National Arena was completely rebuilt ahead of the FIS Nordic World Ski Championships 2011. It features the large ski jumping hill Holmenkollbakken and the normal hill Midtstubakken, along with a cross-country skiing stadium. The large hill and the stadium were both used during the 1952 Olympics. Cross-country sprint were planned located at Tøyen Park. Biathlon was planned to be located at Lillomarka, where a multi-sport venue was planned built. The snowboard and freestyle events are planned split between Wyllerløypa, part of Tryvann Vinterpark, and Grefsenkleiva, part of Oslo Skisenter. Both are existing recreational areas for Alpine skiing and snowboard and within the city. Wyllerløypa was used during the 1952 Olympics for slalom.

Jordal Amfi was the only existing ice rink proposed for the Olympics. It was built as an outdoor venue for ice hockey at the 1952 Winter Olympics. The venue would need a major upgrade to be suitable the 2018 Games, for which it was planned to host curling. Valle Hovin was at the time of the application an outdoor speed skating rink. Independent of the Olympic application, plans exist to rebuild it as an indoor venue. Oslo Podium was primarily planned as a national stadium for handball, for which Norway several times has hosted world and European championships, and for which Oslo lacks a suitable venue. It was planned to be located at Hasle and built independent of Oslo hosting the Winter Olympics, but the plans for the venue were canceled in 2009, after the Norwegian Handball Federation had not made up their mind, and Oslo Municipality needed the lot for a school. The venue would have been owned by the federation. Two more new ice rinks were planned, at Stubberud and Mortensrud. The former would feature ice hockey, while the latter would host figure skating and short-track speed skating.

Three venues would be located in the Lillehammer area; all three of them were used during the 1994 Winter Olympics. Hafjell would have hosted the slalom and giant slalom tournaments, while Kvitfjell would feature downhill and super-G. Both are regularly used in the FIS Alpine Ski World Cup and Kvitfjell is part of Club 5+. Kvitfjell would need a new downhill course. If IOC requirements changed so a single arena for all Alpine sports was needed, the technical disciplines could be moved from Hafjell to Kvitfjell. Lillehammer Olympic Bobsleigh and Luge Track, located at Hunderfossen, would feature bobsleigh, luge and skeleton. The track is the only one in Northern Europe.

The main Olympic Village would be located in Bjørvika, on waterfront property in downtown Oslo. In addition, a smaller Olympic village would be built in Hafjell. The Oslo village would have 3,000 rooms and 4,500 beds, while the Hafjell Village would have 700 rooms and 1,000 beds. As of 2007, the Oslo region has 10,500 hotel beds and the Lillehammer area 3,200 beds, most of which would be rented by the organizing committee. Additional accommodation capacity could be generated by using 50,000 beds in cabins and rental apartments in the Lillehammer area and 10,000 hotel beds in a distance of 50 to 100 kilometers (30 to 60 mi) from the venues, and the use of cruise ships docked at the Port of Oslo. The media center and international broadcasting center were to be located at Lohavn, with media accommodation being located at Lohavn and Filipstad. All Oslo accommodation and media facilities are part of the Fjord City project. Opening, closing and medal ceremonies in Oslo would be held at Rådhusplassen, a square in the city center. In Lillehammer, the medal ceremonies would have been located at Stortorget, the main square in the town.

List of venues
Venue	Sports	Status	Previous	Capacity
Grefsenkleiva	Freestyle, snowboard	New	—	14,000
Hafjell	Alpine skiing	Existing	1994	35,000
Holmenkollen National Arena	Nordic skiing	Existing	1952	50,000
Kvitfjell	Alpine skiing	Existing	1994	40,000
Jordal Amfi	Curling	Existing	1952	4,000
Lillehammer Olympic Bobsleigh and Luge Track	Bobsleigh, luge, skeleton	Existing	1994	15,000
Lillomarka	Biathlon	New	—	40,000
Mortensrud	Figure skating, short-track speed skating	New	—	12,000
Oslo Podium	Ice hockey	New	—	10,000
Rådhusplassen	Ceremonies	Existing	–	30,000
Stortorget (Lillehammer)	Ceremonies	Temporary	—	—
Stubberud	Ice hockey	New	–	8,000
Tøyen Park	Cross-country spring	Temporary	—	40,000
Valle Hovin	Speed skating	New	—	10,000
Wyllerløypa	Freestyle, snowboard	Existing	1952	14,000

The location of the venues was such that all sites in Oslo would be located on the Oslo Metro or the Oslo Tramway, and the Lillehammer venues would all be located on the Dovre Line. Athletes, officials and VIPs would be transported using buses and dedicated cars on closed-off roads. Oslo's public transport system transported at the time of the application 500,000 people per day, with large vacant capacity between the rush hours. Transport between Oslo and the Lillehammer area would be done using railway, as well as European Route E6 and National Road 4 In 2007, travel time by train from Oslo to Lillehammer was 125 minutes, to Hafjell and Hunderfossen 140 minutes, and to Kvitfjell 168 minutes. Oslo Airport, Gardermoen is located between Oslo and Lillehammer; the Airport Express Train has a travel time of 19 minutes to Oslo Central Station, while the regional train uses 105 minutes to Lillehammer. Sandefjord Airport, Torp and Moss Airport, Rygge can both be used as reserve airports.

The application states that Oslo plans to build the venues in places were they can be used for recreation after the games. Hafjell, Kvitfjell, Tryvann and Grefsen are privately owned, and for these, commercial operations will resume also after the Olympics. The placement of the venues is part of the municipality's strategy to decrease the differences between the East End and West End of Oslo.

== Evaluation and outcome ==
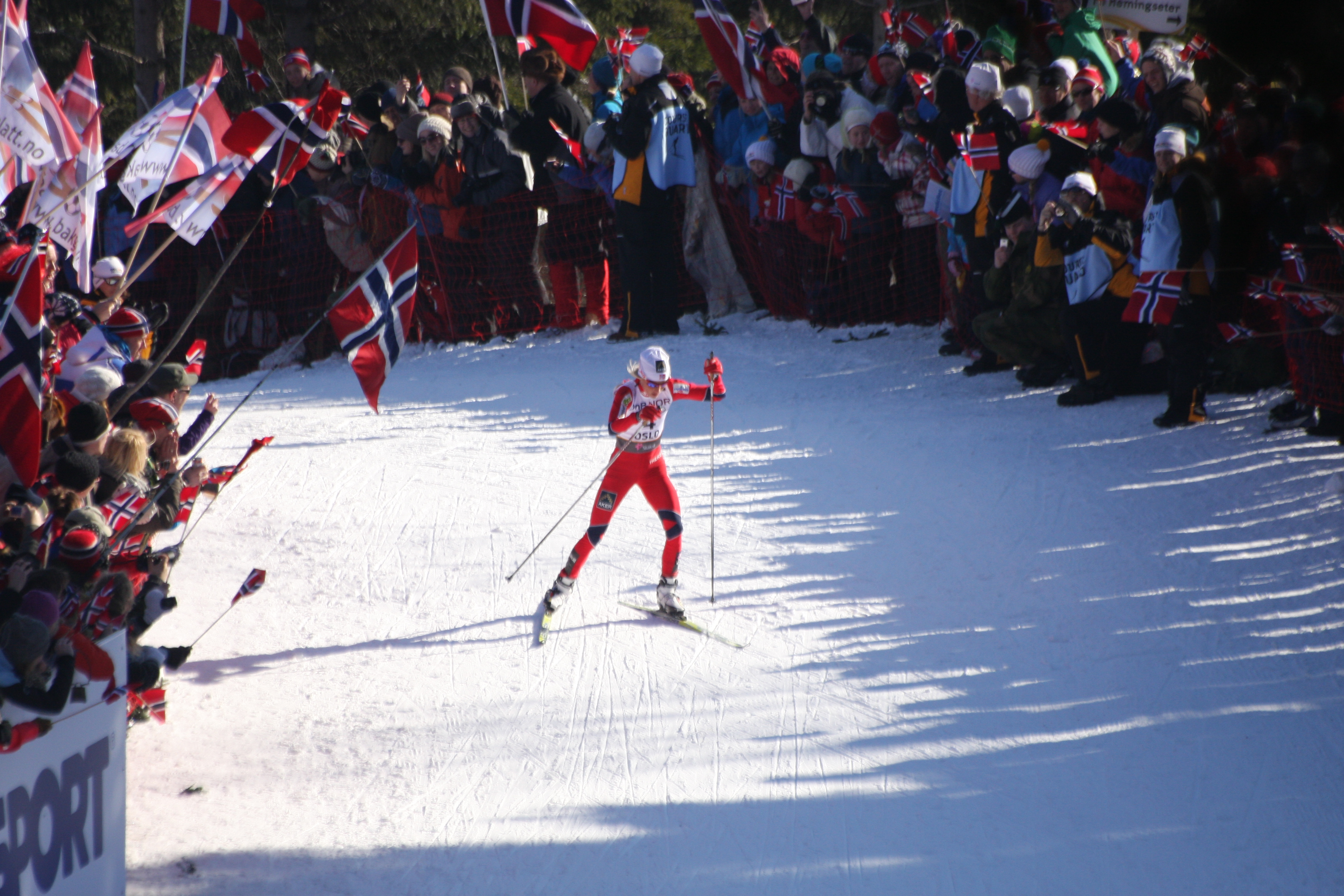
Therese Johaug during the women's 30 km at the FIS Nordic World Ski Championships 2011

The Oslo bid was one of three submitted to NIF, along with Trondheim and Tromsø. The three bids were evaluated, based on the same criteria that IOC uses to evaluate bids, by a committee led by Odd Martinsen. They concluded that Oslo was the most suited, followed by Trondheim and Tromsø. The decision for a Norwegian applicant was taken by the NIF board on 30 March 2007. In the first round of voting, only Geir Kvillum voted for Trondheim. In the following round, both Oslo and Tromsø received six votes, and President Odd-Roar Thorsen received the decisive vote. The bid for Tromsø was later discarded by NIF; three independent reports all concluded that the town was not suited to host the games, in particular because of lack of suitable transport, accommodation and post-Olympic use of venues.

Voting outcome
City	Round 1	Round 2
Tromsø	6	6
Oslo	5	6
Trondheim	1	—

One controversial part of the Oslo bid was the choice of Hafjell and Kvitfjell over Norefjell for Alpine skiing. Norefjell was used for downhill during the 1952 Olympics, and is significantly closer to Oslo than Hafjell and Kvitfjell. Per Ditlev-Simonsen stated that he and the committee originally planned to bid with Norefjell, but that Gerhard Heiberg had recommended that Oslo instead bid with Hafjell and Kvitfjell. IOC President Jacques Rogge later stated that with the distance of 240 kilometers (150 mi) between Oslo and the Alpine venues would make it impossible to be selected. In a documentary made by the Norwegian Broadcasting Corporation, it was stated that Heiberg was in favor of the Tromsø bid, and recommended Oslo to bid with Hafjell and Kvitfjell to reduce their chances of being selected national candidate.

Following the Nordic World Ski Champions held at Holmenkollen in 2011, the debate about Norway hosting the Olympic Games surfaced again. Martin Rimpi, project leader for Tromsø 2018, stated after the world championships that it was unlikely that Tromsø would be a future candidate. He also stated that if a high-speed railway was built between Oslo and Lillehammer, travel time between the towns would be short enough for IOC to accept a bid.
