= Jordal Amfi (1951) =

Indoor ice hockey rink in Oslo, Norway

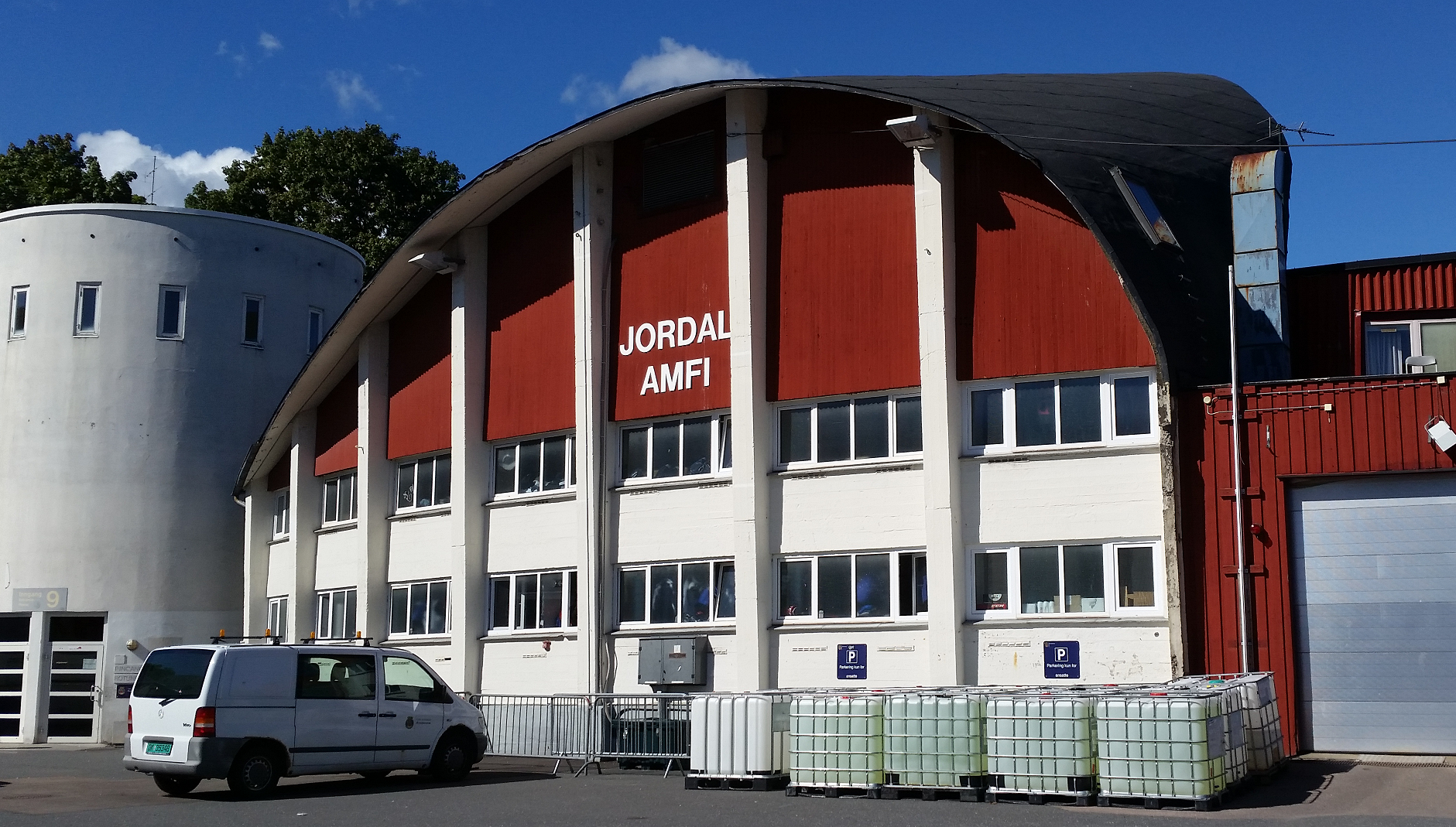
- Jordal Amfi in August 2016
- Interactive map of Jordal Amfi
- Location: Jordal, Oslo, Norway
- Coordinates: 59°54′40.42″N 10°47′2.19″E
- Owner: Oslo Municipality
- Capacity: 10,000 (1951–71); 4,459 (1971–2017)
- Executive suites: 9
- Surface: Artificial ice
- Record attendance: 10,000

Construction
- Groundbreaking: August 1950
- Opened: 12 December 1951
- Renovated: 1971 (roof), 1999
- Closed: 15 January 2017
- Demolished: 2017
- Cost: NOK 4 million
- Architects: Frode Rinnan and Olav Tveten

Tenant
- Vålerenga Ishockey (–1990, 1993–2017)

Jordal Amfi was an indoor ice hockey rink in Oslo, Norway, the first bearing that name. The venue opened in 1951 to host the 1952 Winter Olympics. Jordal was also the site of the 1958 and the 1999 IIHF World Championship. It would in the following decades also serve several boxing matches and concerts.

Jordal Amfi was historically significant for Norwegian hockey and was home to 26 national championships of the GET-ligaen side Vålerenga Ishockey. It also hosted the Norway national ice hockey team. The arena's design by Frode Rinnan and Olav Tveten was characterized by its asymmetrical shape, giving steep and tall stands on the one end and low stands on the other. In 2017, the arena was closed down to be replaced by a new one.

== History ==
When Oslo was awarded the Winter Olympics in 1947, there were no suitable venues to host Olympic ice hockey, as there were no arenas with artificial ice and all ice rinks were part of multi-sports venues. The organizing committee applied for exemption to allow them to use multi-sport venues, but the motion was dismissed. The controversies surrounding ice hockey at the 1948 Winter Olympics, in which two teams arrived in St. Moritz to compete for the United States at the 1948 Winter Olympics, nearly caused the International Olympic Committee to terminate the 1952 competition. However, it was reinstated in 1951.

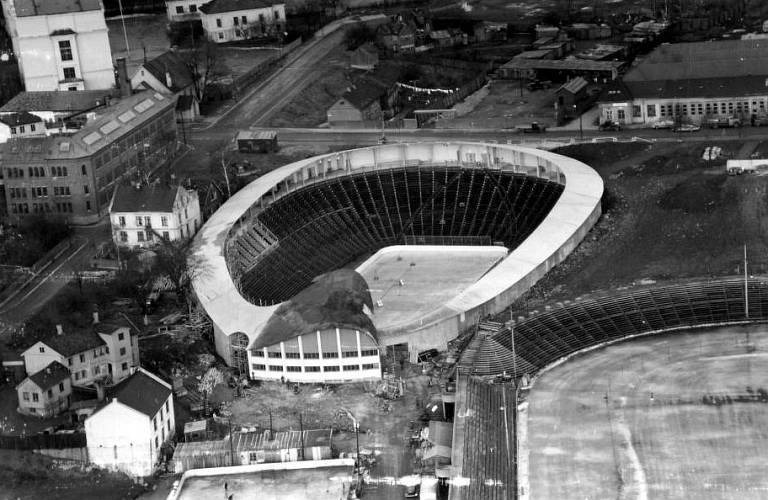
1952 aerial view of Jordal Amfi

The use of artificial ice was at the time not obligatory for Olympic ice competitions. It had only been used once before, at the 1936 Winter Olympics. The city had several incentives for building an artificial rink. In addition to the post-Olympic value of having a quality venue, the committee would not have to designated an out-of-town reserve venue, should there be fair weather during the Olympics. Several locations were considered. The main Jordal proponent was Labor-politician Rolf Hofmo, who was instrumental in deciding on the location, which was at the site of a former brickyard, hence the dug-out hill location. This was also the location of Jordal Stadion, a local stadium built between 1930 and 1936.

The choice of Jordal had the drawback of poor ground conditions and that the site was a hill. This was overcome by the architects Frode Rinnan and Olav Tveten by building the venue into the hill as an amphitheater, hence the name, along with a stage at the low end. Construction was budgeted to cost 2 million Norwegian krone (NOK), but construction cost NOK 4 million. The overruns were largely caused by difficult ground conditions and the hillside location, with a more conventional location estimated to have halved the construction costs. Half a million krone were also spent because the venue used a year to receive a building permit, so the bulk of construction could not start until early 1951, a year after schedule, although preliminary construction started in August 1950. Jordal contributed to more than half the total cost overruns for the 1952 Winter Olympic venues.

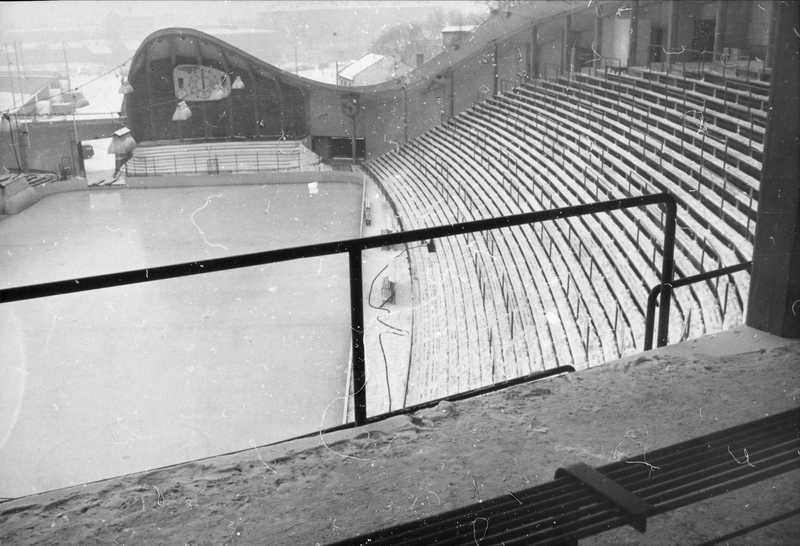
Spectator seating and the stage in 1952

The inaugural configuration had a capacity for 10,000 spectators. For the Olympics there were installed a time-keeping system from Longines, ten commentator and press desks with telephones and two telephone booths. A 60-kilowatt, 400 lux floodlight system was installed. The venue was inaugurated on 12 December 1951 with a hockey match between Norway and Switzerland. Jordal was the first artificial ice rink in the Nordic Countries, and at the time among the most modern hockey rinks in Europe.

In the late 1950s Sonja Henie offered to pay the cost of covering the arena with a roof. This was at the time rejected by the municipality, citing concerns with the venue's architecture being spoiled. However, the lack of a roof placed any event the mercy of the weather, and it gradually became evident that a roof would have to be built. When it was installed in 1971, it was at the cost of the municipality. The stadium was then converted from standing to a seated stands, reducing capacity from 10,000 to under 5,000 spectators. It also saw the removal of the stage. This made it Norway's sixth indoor ice rink. The youth rink, built next to Jordal Amfi, opened in 1989, as the twentieth indoor ice hockey rink in the country. The same year the venue received a series of minor upgrades, followed up with a new ventilation and lighting system in 1993 and a new audio system in 1994.

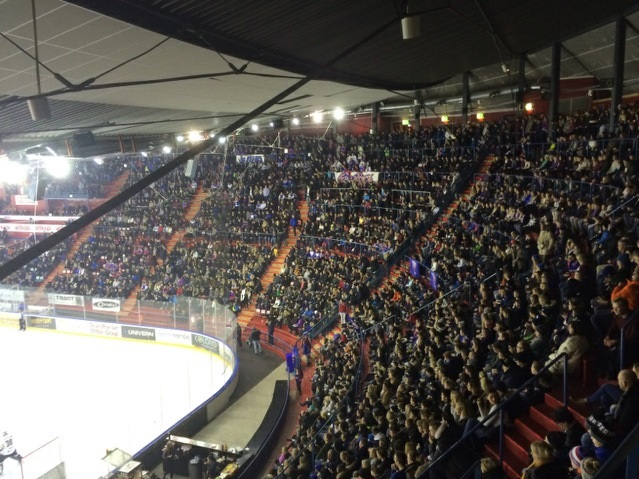
Match between Vålerenga and Stavanger Oilers on 28 December 2015.

Oslo Spektrum opened in 1990 as was planned as the new main venue for ice hockey and handball in Oslo. However, the venue soon turned out to be too expensive for sports, and Jordal soon again became the main ice hockey venue in town. With Norway being awarded the 1999 IIHF World Championships, Oslo Spektrum and its larger capacity were initially considered as the Oslo venue, but was discarded because of the renting cost. Upgrades to Jordal were estimated to cost NOK 25 million and the upgrades were passed by the municipal council in November 1997. The upgrades included four new locker rooms, new seats, upgrades to the technical equipment, a new vestibule, new entrances, better toilets and concessions and the construction of luxury boxes. Construction was heavily delayed; while it was intended to be completed on 8 October 1998, it was finished only days before the opening of the World Championships in May 1999.

== Facilities ==
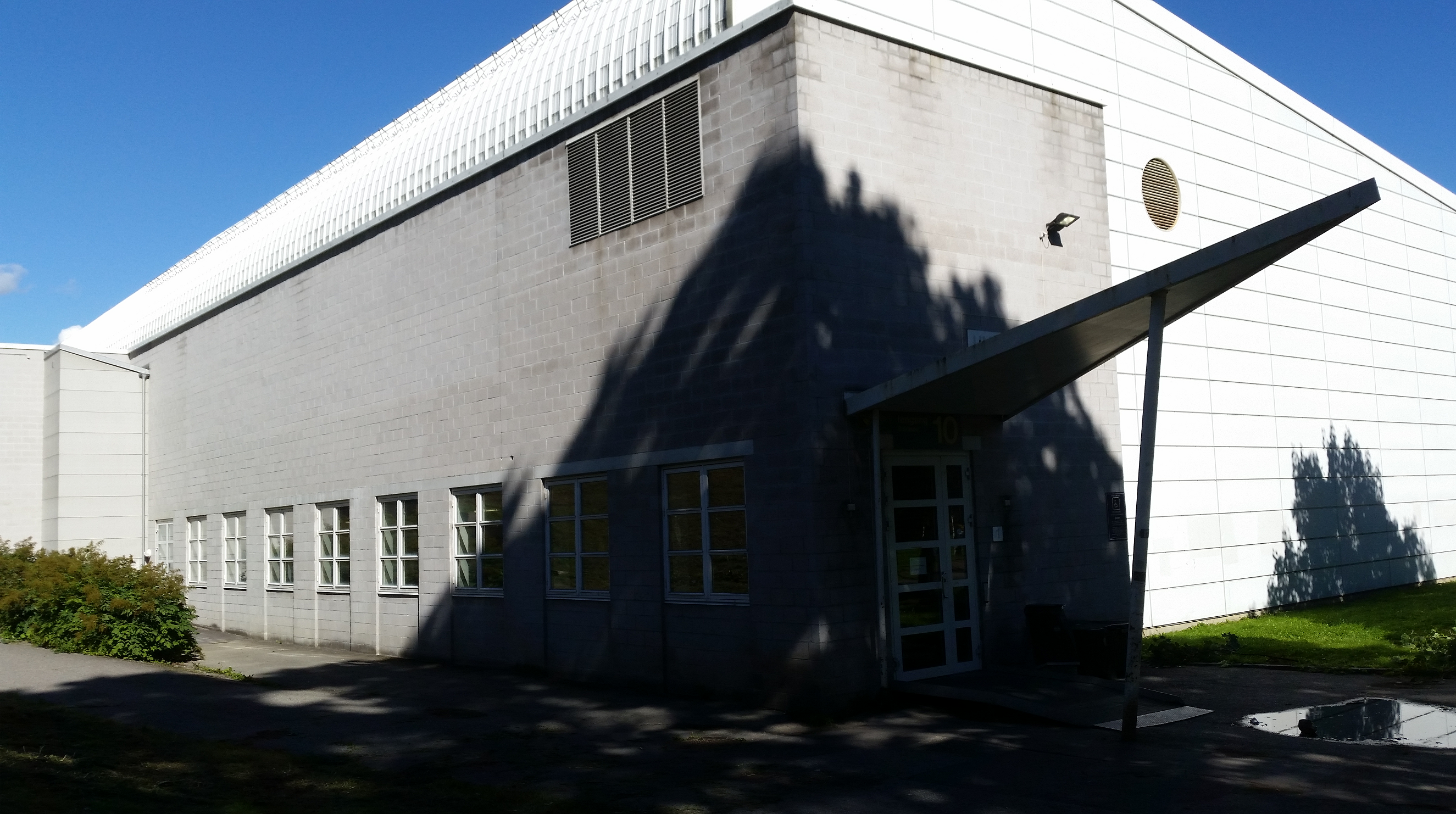
The Youth Rink at Jordal

Being located on the site of an old brickyard, the architecture took advantage of the hillside and dug the venue deep into the hill. This also resulted in the venue having a highly asymmetric shape, with tall spectator stands on the one side and nearly none on the other. The arena had a capacity for 4,450 spectators, of which 3,078 could be seated. It also featured nine luxury suites. The asymmetrical shape and retrofitted roof gave the arena several undesirable traits. The construction of the roof contributed to poor ice quality. During its final years, it was also considered severely outdated. The stands were known to be steep, diminishing accessibility, complicating logistics and hampering even able-bodied spectators.

Jordal Amfi was part of Jordal Idrettspark, a municipal multi-sports complex in the Oslo neighborhood of Jordal.

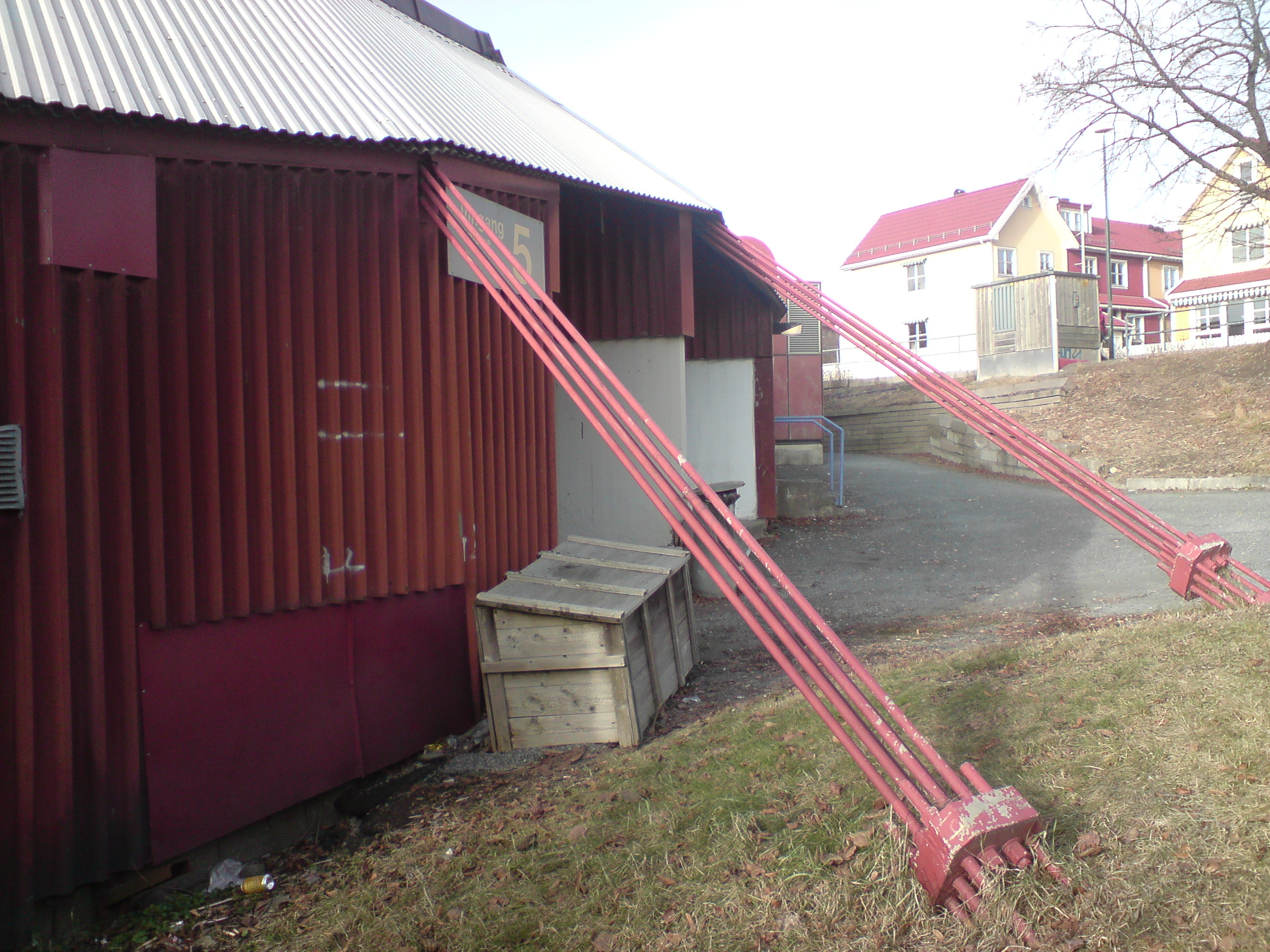
Roof fastening

== Events ==
The ice rink was primarily known as the home venue of Vålerenga Ishockey, the ice hockey division of Vålerengens IF. The venue was also used by Vålerenga Ishockey's academy teams. Other Oslo-based clubs also used Jordal as a home arena for shorter periods during the 20th century.

Jordal was one of five venues used for ice hockey at the 1952 Winter Olympics, along with Dælenenga, Marienlyst, Lillestrøm and Kadettangen. Of 37 matches, 23 were played at Jordal between 15 and 25 February. They were organized as a round-robin tournament with nine participating teams. It doubled as an Ice Hockey World Championships and a European Ice Hockey Championship. The tournament was won by the Edmonton Mercurys, which represented Canada. The figure skating training was originally planned at Jordal Amfi, but was instead moved to Jordal Stadion, to allow the participants to train on natural rather than artificial ice.

The arena as hosted the World Ice Hockey Championships three times. The first, in 1958, consisted of an eight-team round-robin tournament with all games held at Jordal between 28 February and 9 March. The tournament was won by Whitby Dunlops, representing Canada, in a decisive match against the Soviet Union, which drew a crowd of 10,000 spectators. Jordal and Kristins Hall in Lillehammer hosted the B-Group of the 1989 World Ice Hockey Championships, with eighteen matches being hosted in Oslo. The A-Group 1999 edition, played between 1 and 16 May, was contested jointly with Håkons Hall in Lillehammer and Hamar Olympic Amphitheatre. Jordal hosted half the group stage and quarter final matches.

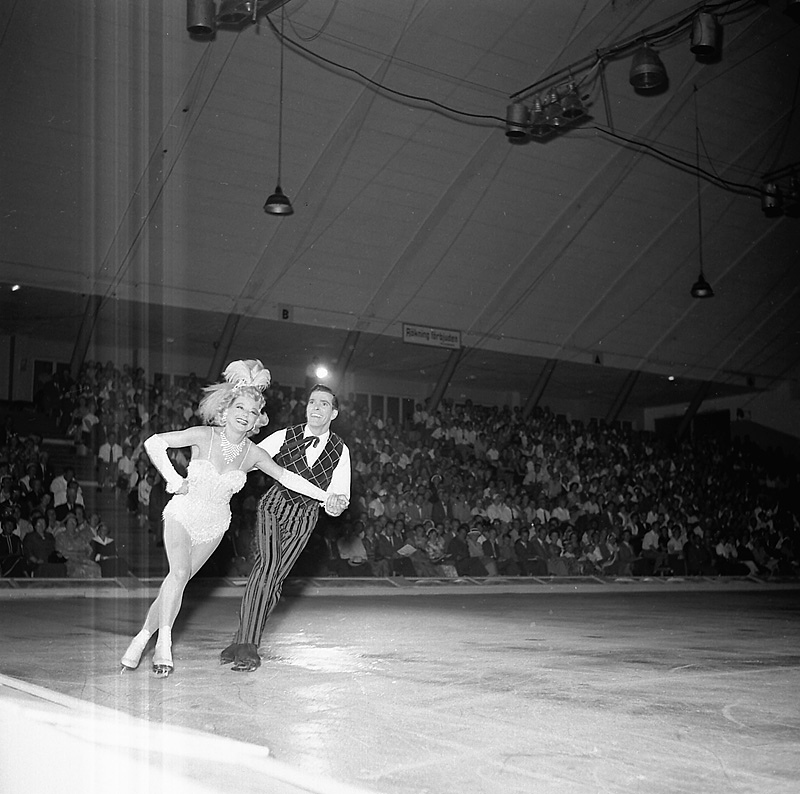
Sonja Henie and Rudy Richards performing at Jordal in 1955

Sonja Henie put on a major figure skating show in 1955, and revisited the venue to hold shows on occasion. During the summer the venue was used to host various events, such as concerts and public meetings. Between 1958 and 1979, Jordal Amfi was regularly used for international professional boxing bouts.

== Final years ==
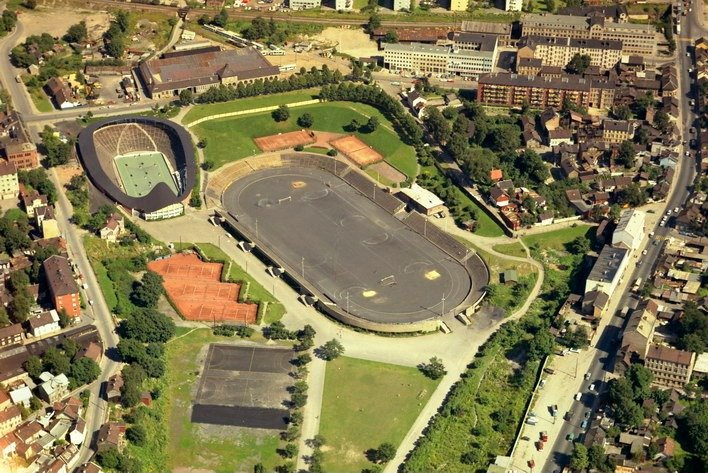
Aerial view of Jordal Idrettspark in 1965

At the time of closure, Jordal Amfi was one of the oldest active ice hockey arenas, and had seen few upgrades since the 1990s, mostly due to the historical value of the arena. However, the arena was largely considered to be unsuited for 21st century arena standards. Talks about building a new arena had been ongoing since the early 2000s, mostly led by the main tenant, Vålerenga Ishockey.

The arena was part of the Oslo bid for the 2018 Winter Olympics, intended to be used for curing events. Jordal Amfi was also being considered for the Oslo bid for the 2022 Winter Olympics. These initially focused on the venue's suitability as a 3,000 or more spectator curling hall. Later the site was instead proposed as a 12,000 seat short track speed skating and figure skating venue. Other plans proposed that a venue at Jordal either could host curling or serve as the smaller ice hockey arena. However, the venue was largely considered unsuitable as an Olympic venue, based on the low ceiling, steep stands, difficult logistics and asymmetrical shape.

The Oslo bid for the 2022 Winter Olympics therefore called for a new venue to be built at the current location of Jordal Stadion, and a new, spectator-free recreational football pitch be built south of the current stadium. This would allow the north-western corner of the multi-sports complex to serve as a site for an all-new hockey venue. It was being considered to be built in two sizes, one with 4,500 seats for curling, or 6,200 seats for hockey. The new venue was estimated to cost NOK 348 million. In addition would come temporary facilities, upgrades to Jordal Amfi and post-Olympic reconstruction, bringing the investment costs to NOK 400 million.

The bid was eventually cancelled, but politicians have since reaffirmed the need for the construction of more hockey halls in Oslo. In June 2016, the city council of Oslo approved the construction of a new arena on the site. Construction started in January 2017. By the time of its demolition, the arena had served continuously for more than 65 years, with minimal renovation. The new arena is projected to be completed in time for the 2018-19 season.

== Bibliography ==
- Andersen, P. Chr. (1952). De olympiske vinterleker Oslo 1952 (in Norwegian). Oslo: Dreyers Forlag.
- Duplacey, James (1998). Total Hockey: The official encyclopedia of the National Hockey League. Total Sports. ISBN 0-8362-7114-9.
- Engh, Pål Henry; Gunnarsjaa, Arne (1984). Oslo en arkitekturguide (in Norwegian). Oslo: Universitetsforlaget. ISBN 82-00-05961-8.
- Kroge, Gunnar (1995). "Jordal Amfi". In Eriksen, Arvid (ed.). Norske idrettsanlegg (in Norwegian). Oslo: Sportsboken. ISBN 82-90773-06-4.
- Organising Committee for the VI Winter Olympic Games (1952). Olympic Winter Games Oslo 1952 (PDF). Oslo. Archived from the original (PDF) on 30 September 2009.
