= Jordal IF =

Norwegian sports club

Jordal Idrettsforening was a Norwegian multi-sports club from the neighborhood of Vålerenga and Jordal in Oslo, founded on 13 June 1921. The club was member of the Workers' Confederation of Sports (AIF) and was an early rival of Vålerengens Idrettsforening.

== History ==
Jordal IF was founded in 1921 as Olymp. The club was not accepted into the Football Association of Norway after applying in both 1921 and 1922. Instead it joined the Workers' Confederation of Sports which had been formed in 1924 as a socialist counterweight to the Norwegian Confederation of Sports. Over the years, the club had sections for association football, athletics, bandy, ice hockey, handball, and volleyball.

Jordal Idrettsforening was dissolved in 2011.
