= Nye Jordal Amfi =

Norwegian indoor ice hockey arena

Jordal Amfi
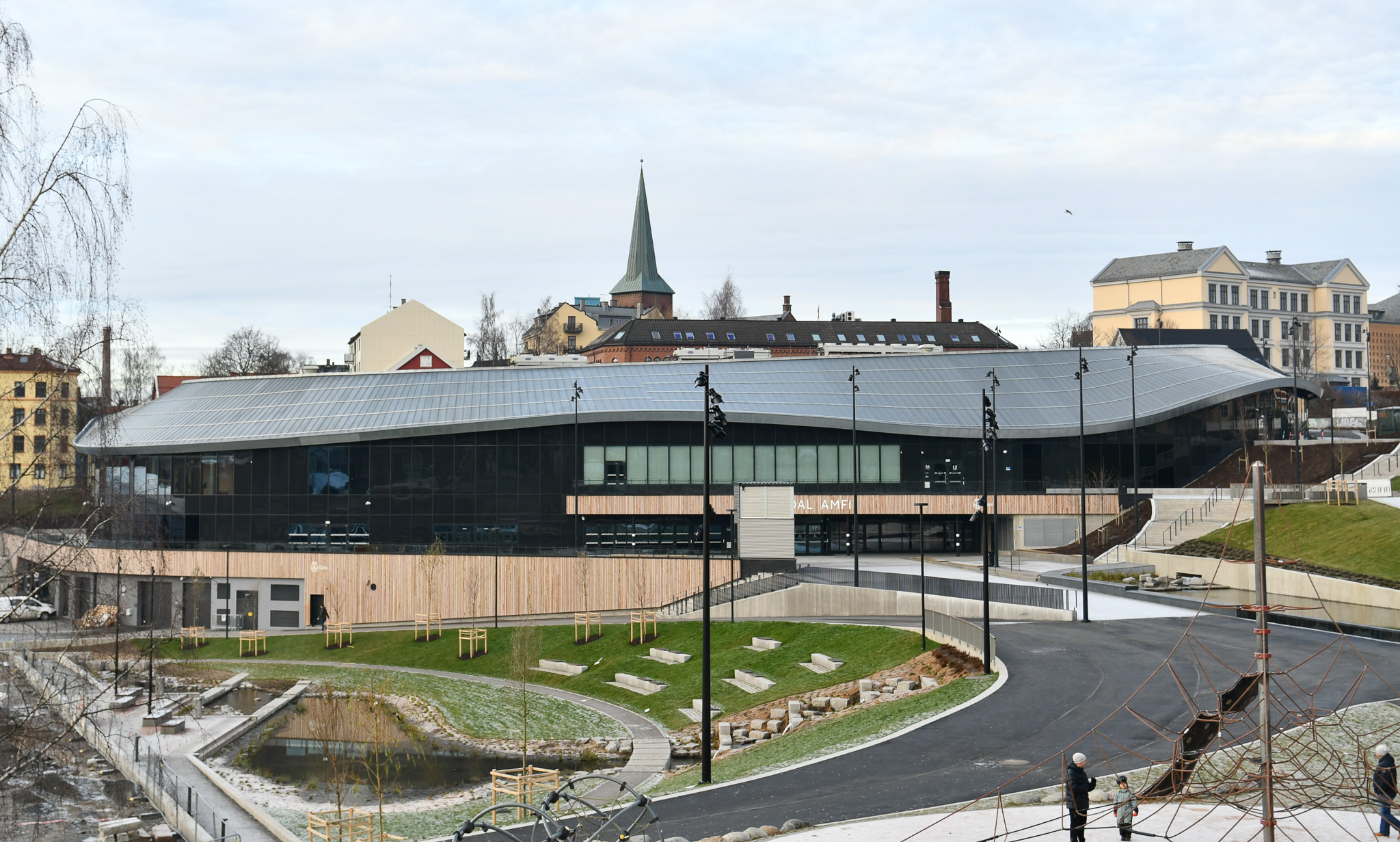
- Interactive map of Jordal Amfi
- Location: Jordal, Oslo, Norway
- Coordinates: 59°54′40.42″N 10°47′2.19″E
- Owner: Oslo Municipality
- Capacity: 5,300
- Executive suites: 22
- Surface: Artificial ice
- Public transit: Metro: Ensjø stasjon Bus: Line 20, 37, 401

Construction
- Groundbreaking: January 2017
- Opened: 25 September 2020
- Cost: NOK 400 million
- Architect: Hille Melbye
- Main contractor: NCC

Tenant
- Vålerenga Ishockey (2020-)

Jordal Amfi (often called Nye Jordal Amfi) is an indoor ice hockey arena, located in the Jordal district of Oslo, Norway. The 5,300-spectator arena is part of the multi-sports complex Jordal Idrettspark and serves as the home of Eliteserien (ice hockey) side Vålerenga Ishockey.

Construction on the new arena started in January 2017, with completion in September 2020.

== History ==
The 2020 Jordal Amfi is the second ice hockey arena to be built on the site. The first arena was completed in 1951, in time for the 1952 Winter Olympics. In June 2016, the city council of Oslo approved the construction of a new arena on the site. Construction work started in January 2017.

The new arena opened 10 October 2020 with a game in which Vålerenga beat Grüner 4–1.

The arena hosted a EuroBasket 2025 qualification match between Norway and Denmark on 3 July 2022.

== See also ==
- List of indoor arenas in Nordic countries
