= Frode Rinnan =

Norwegian architect and politician (1905–1997)

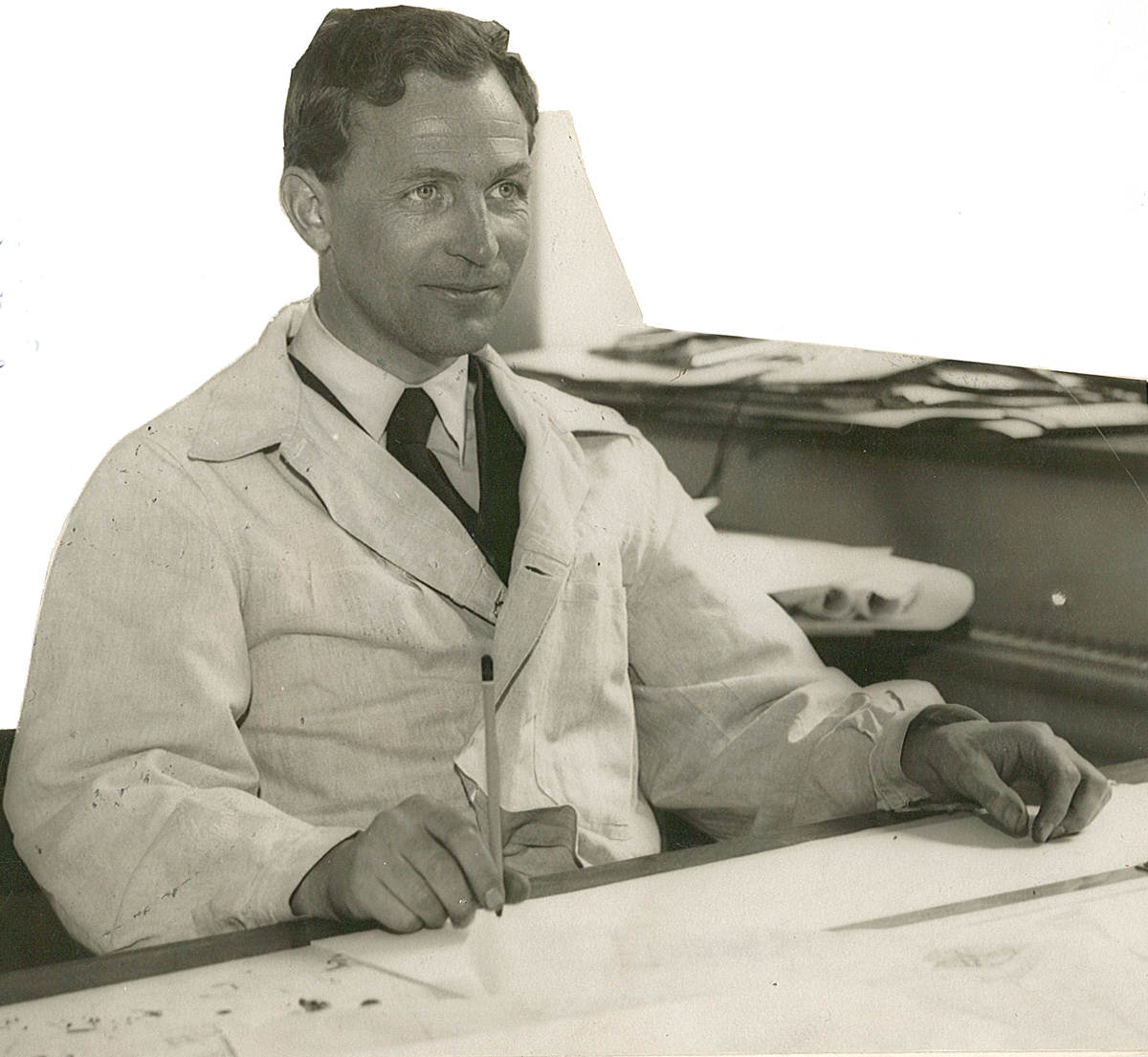
Frode Rinnan (ca 1940)

Frode Rinnan (12 December 1905 – 15 February 1997) was a Norwegian architect and politician for the Labour Party.

== Early career ==
He was born in Trondhjem as a son of ship inspector Carl Julius Rinnan (1881–1963) and his wife Thonny Nielsen (1880–1955). After finishing his secondary education in 1925, he enrolled at the Norwegian Institute of Technology where he graduated in architecture in 1930. He chaired the Student Society in Trondheim in the autumns of 1928 and 1929. He worked as an assistant of architect Ole Øvergaard from 1931 to 1932, before working in the publishing house Fram Forlag for a year. He was a member of the revolutionary socialist group Mot Dag and the pacifist group Clarté. He was also active in Arbeidernes Idrettsforbund with planning of sports venues.

He later worked in HSB in Gothenburg before starting his own architect's office Rinnan og Tveten together with Olav Tveten. During the German occupation of Norway, which started in 1940, Rinnan joined the Norwegian resistance movement. He was arrested on 11 June 1941 for working on an illegal newspaper. He was imprisoned at Møllergata 19 until July 1941, then at Grini concentration camp until April 1942, then at Møllergata again until August 1943, then at Grini again until 30 September 1943. He was then shipped to Sachsenhausen concentration camp, where he was incarcerated until the war's end.

== Post-war career ==
After the war Rinnan became a teacher in the department of architecture at the Norwegian National Academy of Craft and Art Industry (in 1961 the department became the Oslo School of Architecture. Also, he soon became famous for his own works. He was hired by the state to conduct work for the 1952 Winter Olympics, and designed the Holmenkollen ski jump, the speed skating arena Bislett Stadion and the ice hockey arena Jordal Amfi. He was also a consultant for the sports department of Oslo municipality, and designed the swimming arena Frognerbadet and the indoor multi-sports arena Njårdhallen. Holmenkollen and Bislett have since been torn down and rebuilt (2008 and 2004 respectively).

In the 1950s and 1960s Rinnan worked with several grand building projects for Oslo municipality. He planned several entirely new neighborhoods in the city, including Tveita and Lambertseter; the latter called "the first Norwegian dormitory town". For the Oslo Bolig- og Sparelag he and Olav Tveten designed housing co-operatives at Nordre Åsen, Keyserløkka, Valle-Hovin, Teisen, Oppsal, Haugerud, Trosterud and Hovseter between 1948 and 1976. Rinnan also worked with the University of Oslo's expansion at Blindern between 1958 and 1963.

Rinnan also continued the political work. He represented the Norwegian Labour Party in Oslo city council from 1956 to 1963. Together with left-wingers such as Karl Evang, Vilhelm Aubert, Kristian Gleditsch, Johan Vogt and Reidar Aulie, Rinnan discussed starting a new, fortnightly publication to represent the leftist opposition within the Labour Party. It did not happen, but some of the people involved later started Orientering. Rinnan had formerly been an editorial board member of the periodical Plan, from 1933 to 1936. From 1959 to 1963 he presided over the National Association of Norwegian Architects; he became an honorary member here in 1980.

Rinnan was married twice. He died in February 1997 in Oslo.
