= Jordal =

Neighborhood in Oslo, Norway

Coordinates: 59.9103°N 10.7838°E

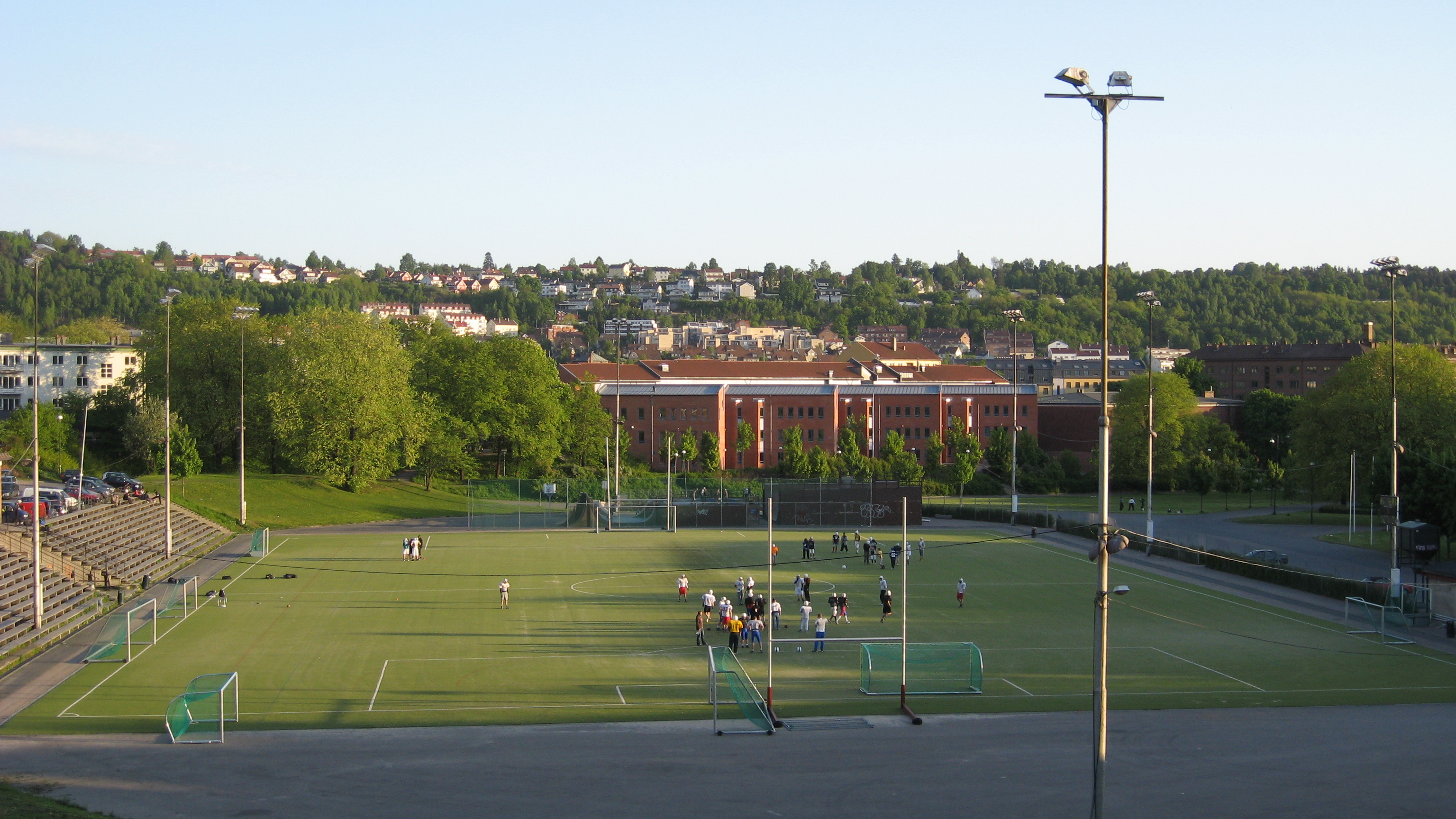
Jordal Idrettspark, with multipurpose association football pitch and American football field

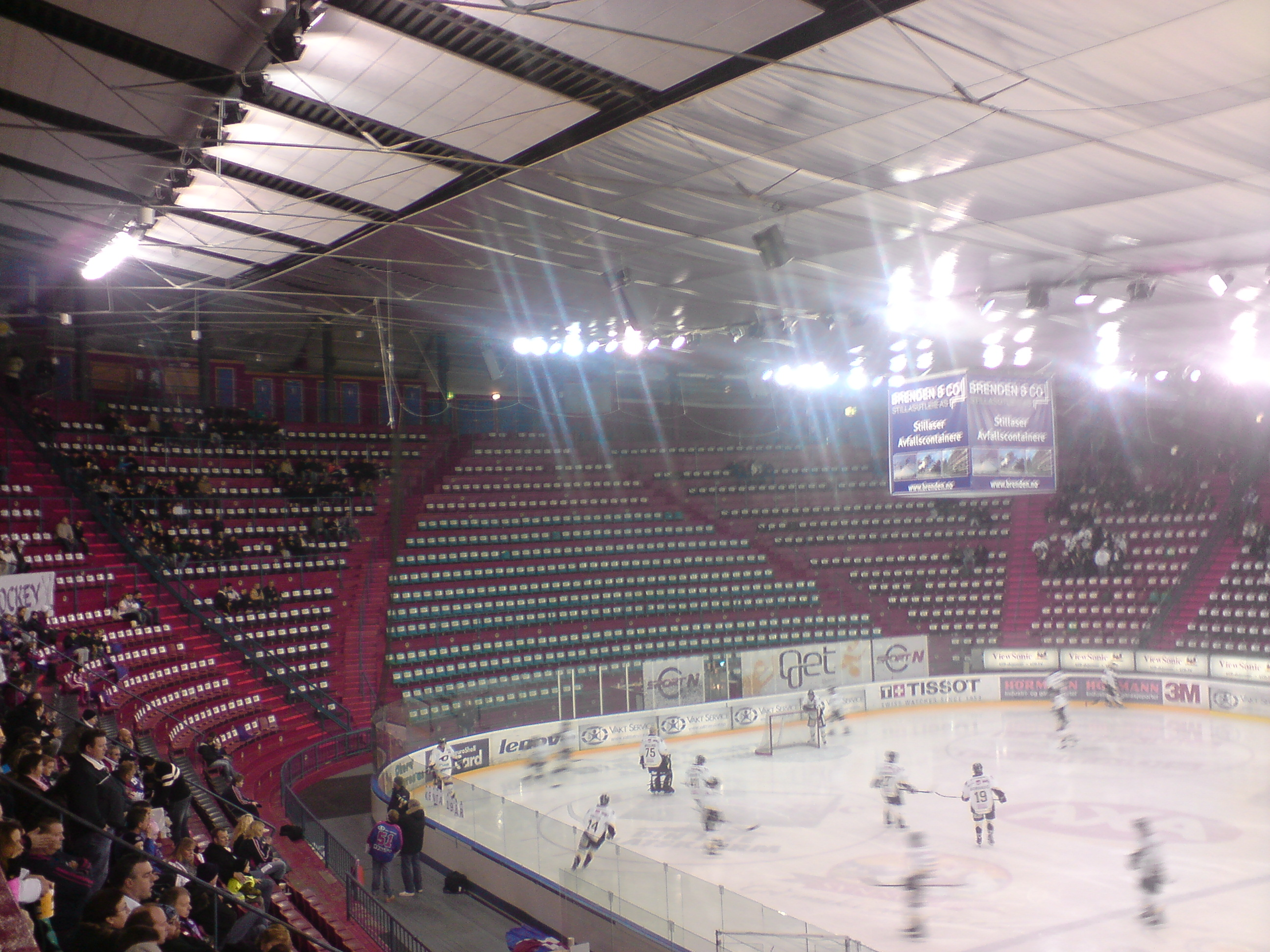
Interior of Jordal Amfi

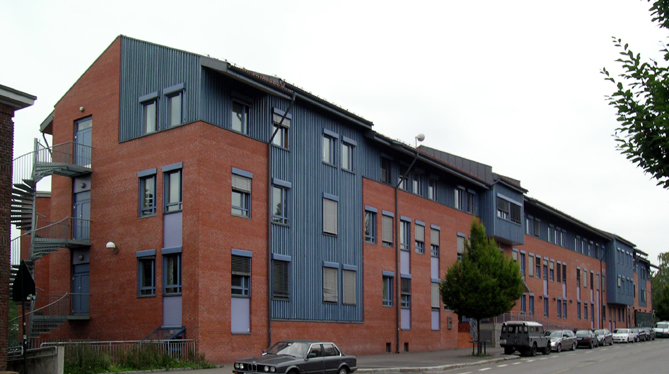
Jordal School

Jordal is a neighbourhood in the borough of Gamle Oslo in Oslo, Norway.

The neighbourhood is in a small valley between Kampen and Vålerenga, on a portion of the land previously occupied by the Nedre Valle farm. The area then became part of the Aker municipality until 1878, when Aker was incorporated into Kristiania (renamed Oslo in 1925). Jordal was known for the Jordal Teglverk brickworks, on the site now occupied by the Jordal Amfi, built as the venue for ice hockey at the 1952 Winter Olympics. The area is served by Ensjø station on the Oslo Metro.

== See also ==
- Jordal Idrettspark
- Jordal IF - a defunct sports club that used the Jordal facilities
- Vålerengens IF - a sports club that uses the Jordal facilities
