= Olav Tveten =

Norwegian architect (1907–1980)

Olav Tveten (5 April 1907 – 19 December 1980) was a Norwegian architect.

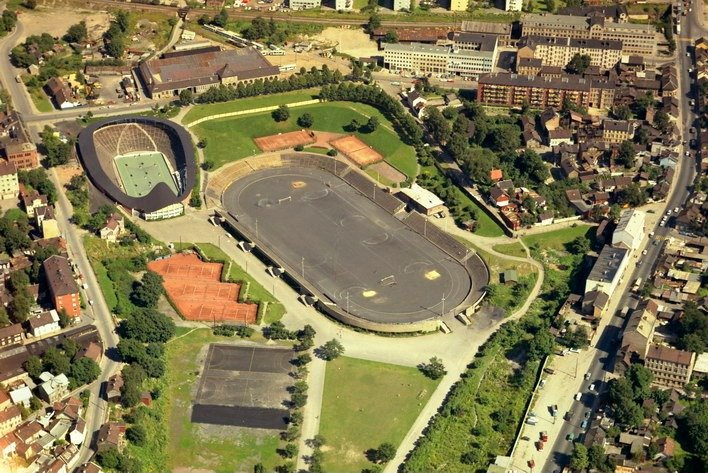
Aerial view of Jordal Idrettspark in 1965

Tveten was born in Bærum in Akershus, Norway. He was the son of Magnus Tveten (1867–1950) and Mathilde Kristine Kirkeby (1867–1944). He finished his education at the Norwegian Institute of Technology in 1932. He was employed as an architectural assistant in Tønsberg in 1933 and with architect Ragnvald Tønsager (1888–1964) in Oslo from 1934 to 1935.

From 1935 he had his own architect's office in Oslo together with Frode Rinnan (1905–1997) . They were known for planning residential areas such as Lambertseter and Tveita in Oslo, as well as sports venues. In connection with the 1952 Winter Olympics in Oslo, he was responsible for rebuilding the facility in Holmenkollbakken, changes at Bislett Stadium ( Bislett stadion) and the entry of Jordal Amfi.
