= Njårdhallen =

Indoor sports arena located in Vestre Aker, Oslo, Norway

Coordinates: 59°56′28″N 10°40′18″E

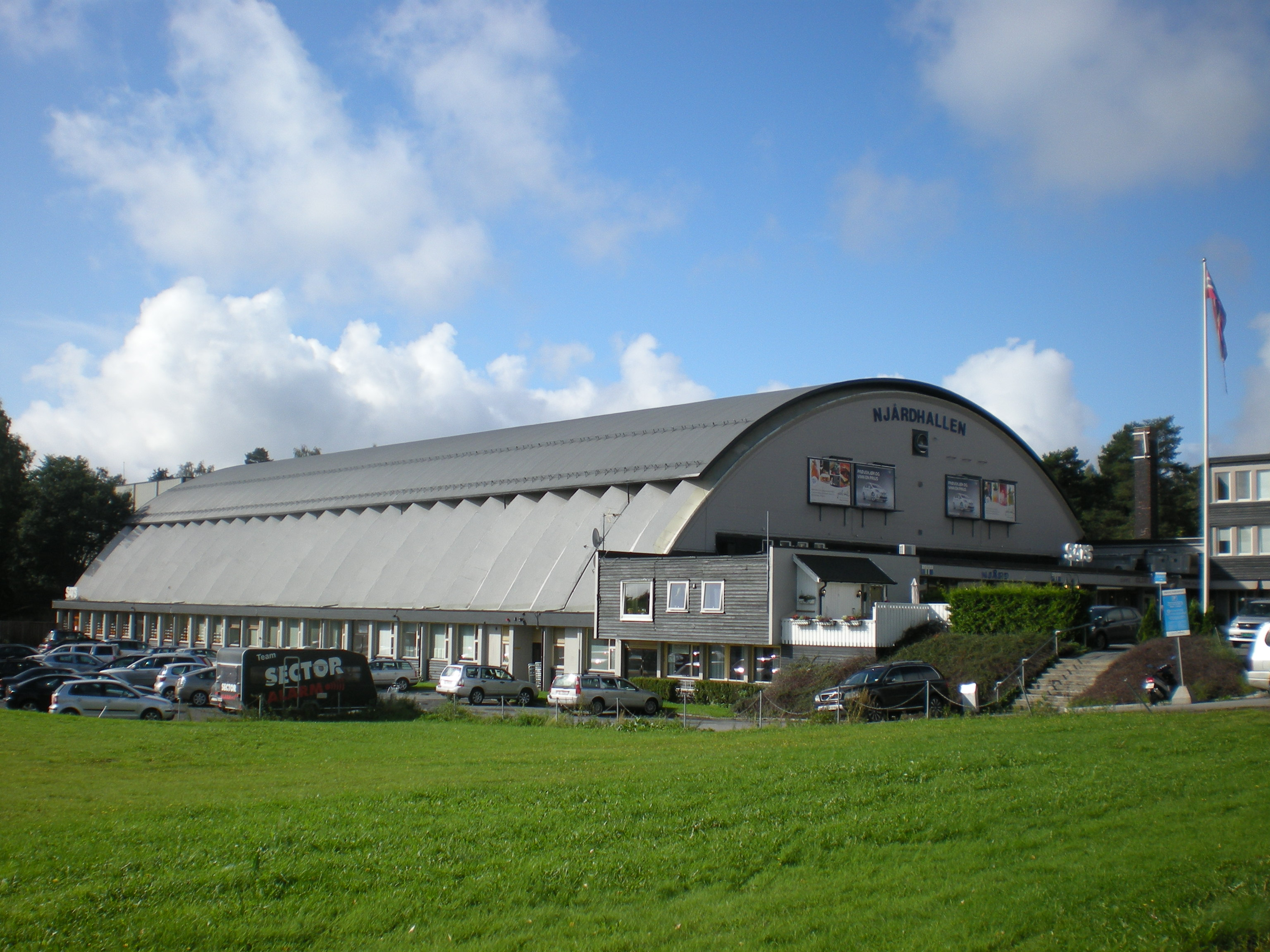
- Interactive map of Njårdhallen
- Location: Vestre Aker, Oslo

Construction
- Opened: 1960
- Architect: Frode Rinnan

Njårdhallen is an indoor sports arena located in Vestre Aker, Oslo, Norway. It was opened in 1960, and designed by Frode Rinnan. It is mainly used by the sports club Njård for indoor sports such as basketball and handball. Formerly, mainly in the 1960s and 1970s, it was used for large meetings and rock concerts. It has also been used as a professional boxing venue.

== Notable concerts in Njårdhallen ==
- 1960 - March 1 – Jazz at the Philharmonic with Ella Fitzgerald
- 1960 - May – Peer Gynt with Riksteatret
- 1961 - February 17 – Louis Armstrong
- 1961 - August 23 – Cliff Richard
- 1963 - October 23 – John Coltrane quartet including McCoy Tyner, Elvin Jones og Jimmy Garrison
- 1964 - April 15 – Jim Reeves, Chet Atkins, Bobby Bare, Anita Kerr Singers.
- 1964 – The Everly Brothers.
- 1967 - January 25 – Duke Ellington
- 1967 - April 7 – Otis Redding, Sam & Dave, Arthur Conley, Eddie Floyd, The Mar-Keys, Booker T. & the M.G.'s.
- 1967 - May 2 – The Who.
- 1969 - March 18 - The Cannonball Adderley Quintet.
- 1969 - March 29 / November 3 – Fleetwood Mac.
- 1969 - June 14 – Blind Faith.
- 1970 - May 13 – Ella Fitzgerald, Count Basie
- 1970 - October 21 – Modern Jazz Quartet including Milt Jackson
- 1970 - October 22 – Charles Mingus sextet, Earl Hines
- 1970 - November 11 – Deep Purple,
- 1972 - January 11 – Jethro Tull
- 1971 - April 22 – Black Sabbath.
- 1971 - April 26 – Deep Purple.
- 1972 - January 10 – Jethro Tull
- 1972 - August 9 – Wings/Paul McCartney.
- 1974 - September 25 – Suzi Quatro.
- 1974 - October 6 – Sweet.
- 1974 - September 18 – Frank Zappa.
- 1974 - December 4 Focus
- 1975 - April 28 – Nazareth.
- 1976 - February 23 – Frank Zappa.
- 1976 - March 28 – 10cc.
- 1976 - December 3 – Nazareth.
