= Stubberud =

Stubberud is a surname. Notable people with the surname include:

- Johannes Stubberud (1891–1942), Norwegian newspaper editor
- Jørgen Stubberud (1883–1980), Norwegian polar explorer
- Jørn Stubberud, (born 1968), Norwegian musician
- Liv Stubberud (1930–1997), Norwegian politician
