= Trondheim bid for the 2018 Winter Olympics =

Bids for the 2018 Winter Olympics and Paralympics
Overview
- XXIII Olympic Winter Games; XII Paralympic Winter Games
- Winner: Pyeongchang; Runner-up: Munich; Shortlist: Annecy

Details
- City: Trondheim, Norway
- Chair: Marvin Wiseth
- NOC: Norwegian Olympic and Paralympic Committee and Confederation of Sports

Previous Games hosted
- None

Decision
- Result: Discarded by NOC

Trondheim 2018 (Southern Sami: Tråante 2018) was a proposed bid for Trondheim, Norway, to host the 2018 Winter Olympics. Along with the Oslo and Tromsø bids, it was one of three options for the Norwegian Olympic and Paralympic Committee and Confederation of Sports, who ultimately chose to not bid for the games.

== Plans ==
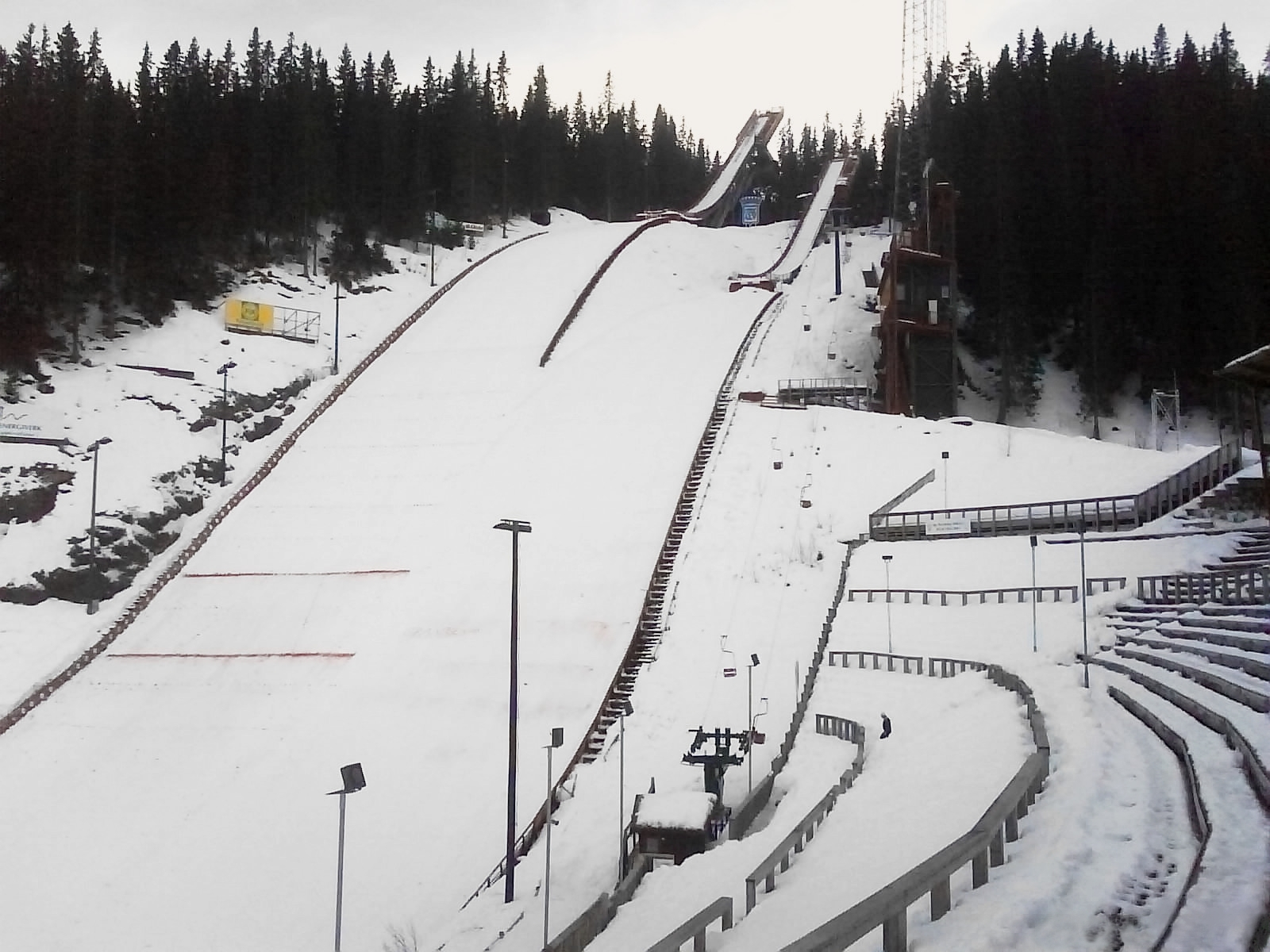
Granåsen was proposed as the venue for Nordic skiing and biathlon

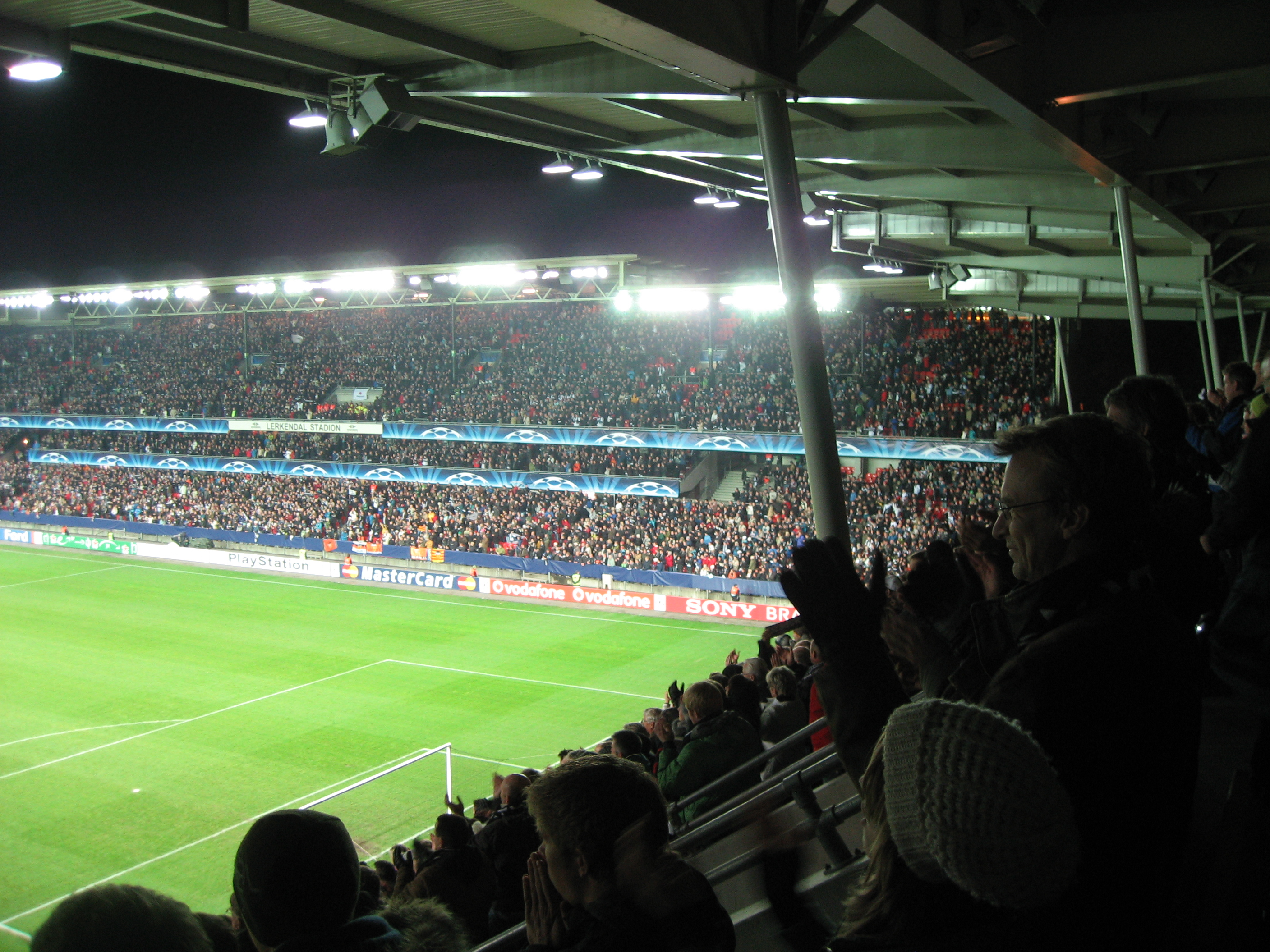
Lerkendal stadion was proposed as the venue for the opening and closing ceremonies

Most of the events would take place in Trondheim Municipality and its suburbs. Nordic skiing and biathlon would have taken place at Granåsen, which previously has hosted the FIS Nordic World Ski Championships 1997. Five competition ice rinks would be built: two at Leangen, for short-track speed skating and figure skating and ice hockey, Tiller for ice hockey, Stjørdal for curling, and Brattøra for speed skating. The latter would be built nearly a sea level, and would have spectators on one end and a glass wall on the other, giving a view of the Trondheimsfjord. Freestyle and snowboarding would be located at Vassfjellet. Alpine skiing and sliding sports would be located in the nearby Oppdal Municipality. With the exception of Brattøra, all venues would have been built in connection with existing venues.

The opening and closing ceremonies would have taken place at Lerkendal Stadion, the home ground of Rosenborg BK. A media center was planned at Lerkendal, which would afterwards be converted to student housing. The Olympic Village would be located at Tempe, and would afterwards be sold as housing. A separate Olympic Village would be built in Oppdal. Medal ceremonies would take place at Torvet in the city center of Trondheim, and Torget in Oppdal. For volunteers, 30,000 beds exist, and another 30,000 beds are available within two hours of Trondheim.

As long as existing plans for transport in the region were followed, only minor upgrades to Trondheim Airport would be needed. The upgrades would allow the transport time along the 116 kilometers (72 mi) Trondheim and Oppdal in 75 minutes. Marvin Wiseth, who was managing director of the project group, stated that Trondheim's goal was to "give the Olympics back to the people". They estimated 2 million spectators at the events. In Norway, regional policy was an important factor in deciding where the applicant city should be; Wiseth stated that with was completely unimportant for IOC, and that Trondheim first and foremost focused on having the best bid in the world, rather than the best bid in Norway.

Location	Municipality	Sport	Capacity	Status
Granåsen	Trondheim	Nordic skiing, biathlon	40,000	Existing
Hovden	Oppdal	Slalom, giant slalom	30,000	Existing
Vassfjellet	Trondheim	Snowboard, freestyle	15,000	Existing
Kinnpiken	Oppdal	Super-G, downhill	40,000	New
Fritidsparken	Oppdal	Bobsleigh, luge, skeleton	15,000	New
Brattøra	Trondheim	Speed skating	6,000	New
Leangen	Trondheim	Figure skating, short track speed skating	12,000	New
Leangen	Trondheim	Ice hocokey	10,000	New
Tiller	Trondheim	Ice hockey	6,000	New
Stjørdalshalsen	Stjørdal	Curling	3,000	New
Lerkendal Stadion	Trondheim	Opening/closing ceremonies	21,423	Existing
Gløshaugen	Trondheim	International broadcasting center	—	Existing
Gløshaugen	Trondheim	Media center	—	Existing

== Evaluation and outcome ==
The Trondheim bid was one of three submitted to the Norwegian Olympic and Paralympic Committee and Confederation of Sports (NIF), along with Oslo and Tromsø. The three bids were evaluated by a committee led by Odd Martinsen, which concluded that Trondheim was the second-most suitable, behind Oslo, based on the same criteria that IOC uses to evaluate bids. The decision for a Norwegian applicant was taken by the NIF board on 30 March 2007. In the first round of voting, only Geir Kvillum voted for Trondheim. In the following round, both Oslo and Tromsø received six votes, and President Odd-Roar Thorsen received the decisive vote.

City	Round 1	Round 2
Tromsø	6	6
Oslo	5	6
Trondheim	1	—
