= Vålerengens IF =

Norwegian sports club

- Full name: Vålerengens Idrettsforening
- Founded: 1913
- Colours: Blue, White, Red
- Website: www.vif.no

Vålerengens Idrettsforening is a Norwegian multi-sports club from the neighbourhood Vålerenga in Oslo, founded on 29 July 1913.

It has sections for football, ice hockey, american football, handball, floorball, baseball and skiing. The football team, ice hockey team and the american football team are all multiple national champions.

Former sports include athletics, bandy, basketball and wrestling. The club became national champions in bandy for women in 1984, 1986, 1987, and 1988.

The board of directors of Vålerengens IF is chaired by Stein Morisse.

== Major clubs ==
=== Vålerenga Ishockey ===
Vålerenga Ishockey is the most successful club in Norway and the ice hockey club in Scandinavia with most titles, with 29 regular season titles and 26 playoff championships. They play their home games at Jordal Amfi, close to the neighborhood where the club was established.

=== Vålerenga Fotball ===
The association football club has won five league titles since the club was founded in 1913. They play their home games at Intility Arena.

== Other clubs ==
=== Vålerenga Trolls ===
Vålerenga Trolls is the American football department of the club. They play their games at Jordal Idrettspark.

=== Vålerenga Sjakklubb ===
Vålerenga Sjakklubb, also known as Vålerenga Sjakk, is the chess department of the club. In March 2018, then-world champion Magnus Carlsen, joined the club. Vålerenga Sjakklubb will participate in the 2018 European Chess Club Cup.

=== Vålerenga Baseball ===
Vålerenga Baseball began play in 2022, going undefeated in the regular season and winning both the Eliteserien and Norwegian Championship in their first season. In 2023, the club recorded a second undefeated regular season, a shared Norwegian Championship and runner-up in the Eliteserien.

In 2024, the club finished second at the WBSC Europe Federation Cup Qualifiers in Slovenia and won the Norwegian Championship.

They play their home games at Rommen Baseball Park in Oslo.
