= Nydalen Upper Secondary School =

Location
- Oslo; Norway
- Coordinates: 59°57′02″N 10°45′46″E

Information
- Opened: 2011
- Website: https://nydalen.vgs.no/

Nydalen Upper Secondary School (Norwegian: Nydalen videregående skole) is an upper secondary school established on 22 August 2011 located at Nydalen in the borough of Nordre Aker in Oslo, Norway. It replaced Grefsen Upper Secondary School and Sandaker Upper Secondary School. The school building was built and is owned by the private company Avantor, and is leased by the municipality for 25 years, with an option for a further 15. The school was scheduled to open in 2011 and to have 900 pupils and 100 employees.
