= Vålerenga =

Neighbourhood in the city of Oslo, Norway

Coordinates: 59°54′29″N 10°47′17″E

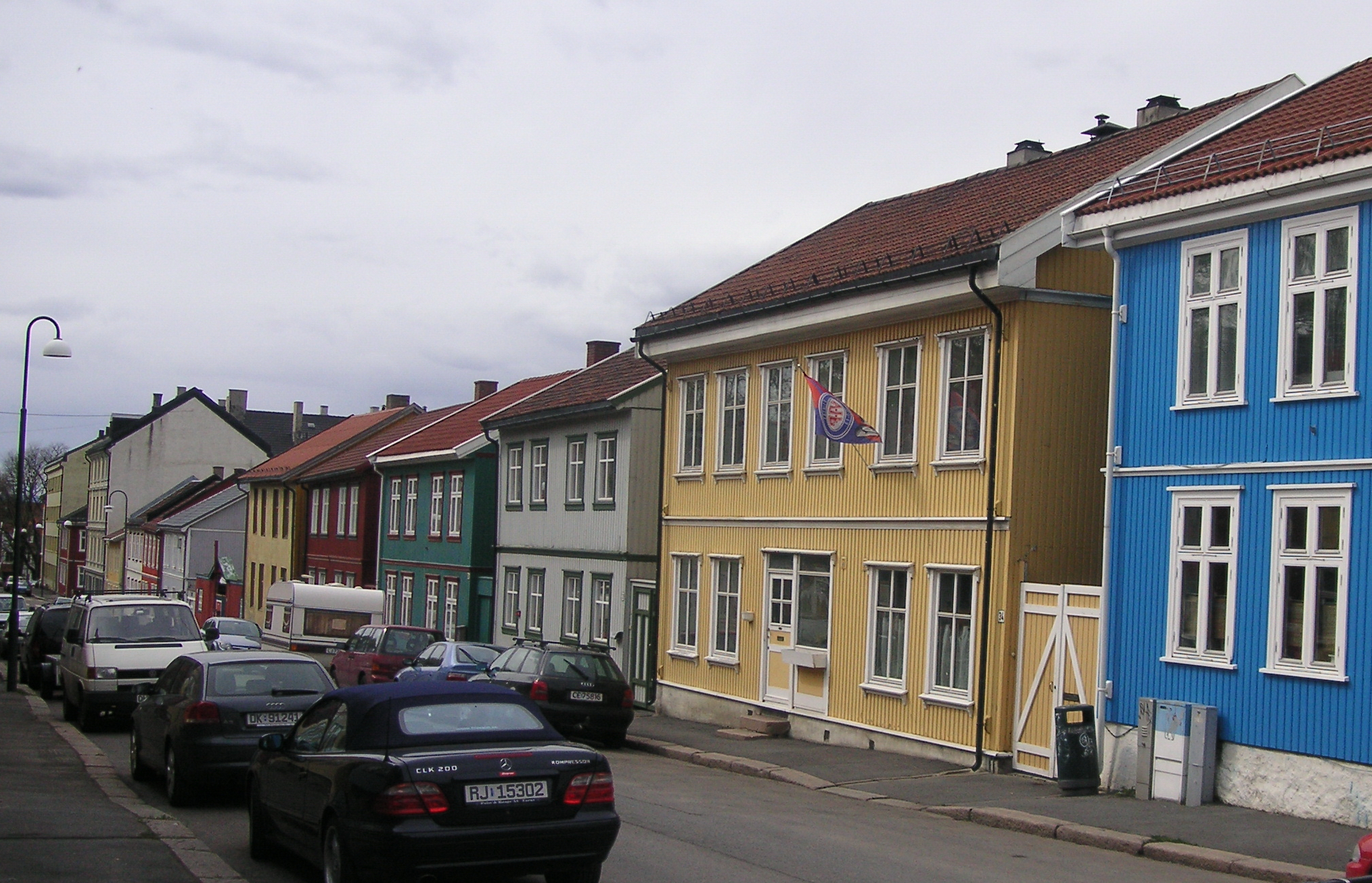
From Danmarks gate, Vålerenga

Vålerenga (Norwegian pronunciation: [ˈvôːɽɛŋɑ]) is a neighbourhood in the city of Oslo, Norway, belonging to the borough of Gamle Oslo. Vålerenga is located between the neighbourhoods of Gamlebyen, Jordal, Ensjø, Etterstad and Lodalen. Vålerenga is in particular known for its traditional, small wooden houses, and for its football and ice hockey-teams: Vålerenga IF Fotball and Vålerenga Ishockey.
