= Vålerenga Trolls =

American football team in Oslo, Norway

Alternate Logo

The Vålerenga Trolls are an American football team located in Oslo, Norway that competes in the Norwegian Federation of American Sports (NAIF). The team was founded in 1983 as the Killer bees but later changed the name to the Oslo Trolls and changed to its current name in 1993. The team won the first Scandinavian Cup in 1984.

The Trolls hold the record for most NoAFF league titles (10), including the first four ever played, and five straight between 1993 and 1997. The Trolls also have more NoAFF Final appearances than any other team with 16.
