= Grefsenåsen =

Hill in Oslo, Norway

Coordinates: 59.959°N 10.8038°E

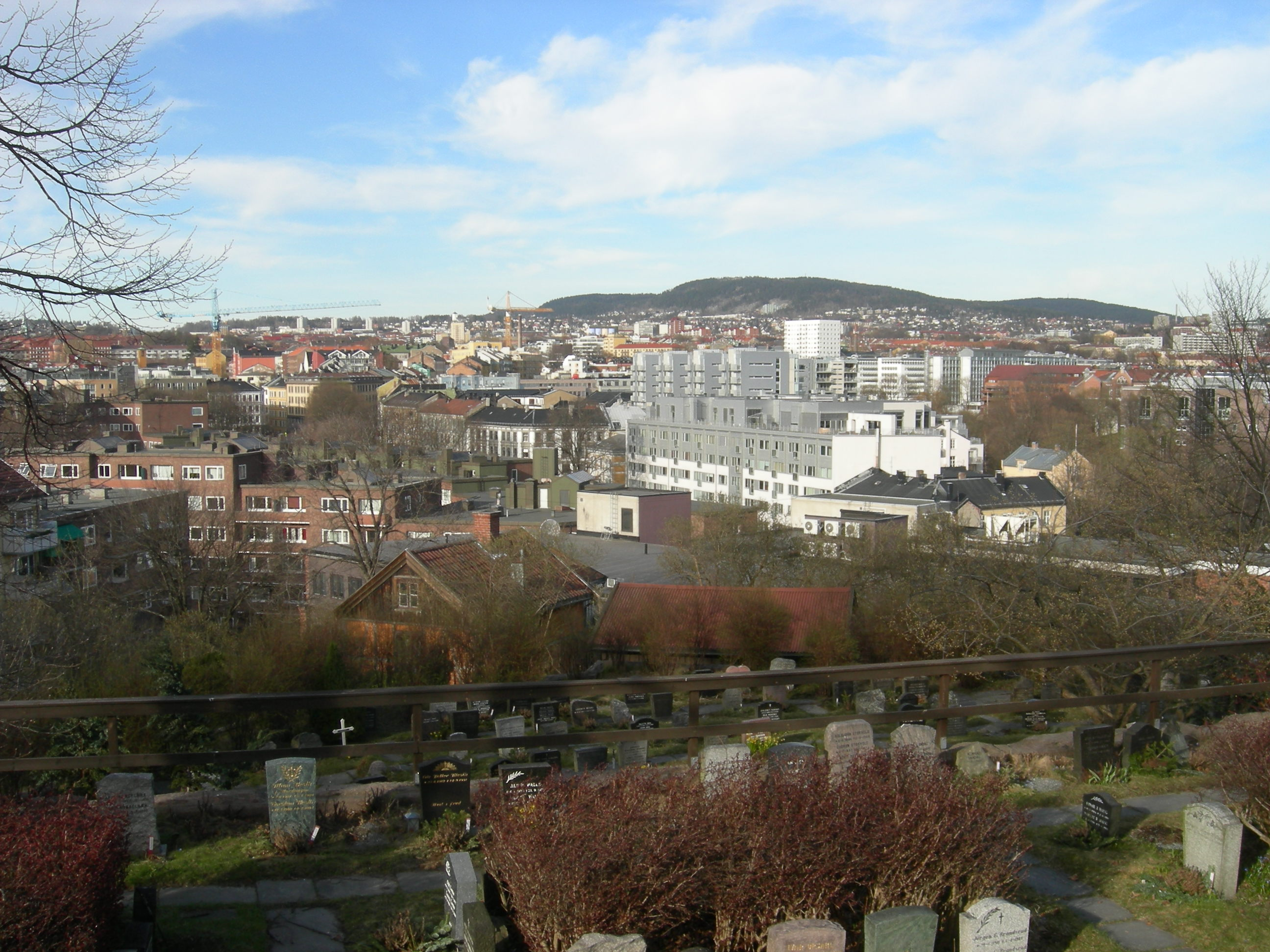
View of Nordre Aker, with Grefsenåsen in the background

Grefsenåsen is a hill in Lillomarka in Oslo, Norway. The height is 377 meter.

The view from the top is magnificent, and the hill has for a long time been a popular resort for day-trippers living in Oslo. A restaurant was built on the top in 1927, and this is still in use.

== The name ==
The hill is named after the old farm of Grefsen, the last element is the finite form of ås m 'mountain ridge'.
