= Bids for the 2014 Winter Olympics =

Olympic selection process

Bids for the 2014 Winter Olympics and Paralympics
Overview
- XXII Olympic Winter Games; XI Paralympic Winter Games
- Winner: Sochi; Runner-up: Pyeongchang; Shortlist: Salzburg

Details
- Committee: IOC
- Election venue: Guatemala City; 119th IOC Session

Map of the bidding cities

Important dates
- First Bid: 28 July 2005
- Second bid: 1 February 2006
- Shortlist: 22 June 2006
- Decision: 4 July 2007

Decision
- Winner: Sochi (51 votes)
- Runner-up: Pyeongchang (47 votes)

Seven applicant cities presented bids to host the 2014 Winter Olympics and Paralympics (formally known as XXII Olympic Winter Games and XI Paralympic Winter Games) to the International Olympic Committee (IOC). The IOC executive board shortlisted three cities—Sochi, Russia; Salzburg, Austria; and Pyeongchang, South Korea—with Sochi winning the IOC's July 2007 final vote.

The three selected candidates, which were chosen on 22 June 2006, delivered to the IOC their Candidature Files (known as bid books) on 10 January 2007. From February to April 2007, an ad hoc committee performed visits to the candidate cities and prepared an evaluation report which was released one month before the election.

The election by exhaustive ballot took place on 4 July 2007 in Guatemala City during the 119th IOC Session; Sochi beat out Pyeongchang by four votes in the second round of voting to win the rights to host after Salzburg had been eliminated in the first round. Pyeongchang could later awarded the 2018 Winter Olympics in 2011, just one year before the 2012 Summer Olympics, and 2024 Winter Youth Olympics in 2020.

== Candidature procedure and timeline ==
Then Russian president Vladimir Putin addresses the IOC session on 4 July 2007 in Guatemala City on behalf of the 2014 Sochi bid.

=== Phase 1: Candidature acceptance procedure ===
Bidding cities had to be approved by their national Olympic committees, which have the right to choose between several cities in their respective countries. The cities had to submit their applications to the IOC by 28 July 2005. The cities were asked to complete a questionnaire, which they had to submit to the IOC by 1 February 2006. An IOC Working Group then studied their answers to help the executive board members select the cities, which became candidate cities and went through to the second phase of the process. The executive board of IOC accepted three bids on 22 June 2006.

=== Phase 2: Candidature procedure ===
The candidate cities were invited to submit their candidature file, which is a detailed description of their Olympic plans, and to prepare for a visit by the IOC Evaluation Commission. This commission undertook a technical analysis of each candidature and produced a report, which was to be published one month before the host-city election and sent to the IOC members for study. The candidature files were submitted on 10 January 2007. The IOC Evaluation Committee visited the candidate cities in February and March 2007, and published its report on 4 June.

During the 119th IOC Session on 4 July 2007 in Guatemala City, Salzburg received 25 votes and was relegated, Pyeongchang received 36 votes, and Sochi received 34 votes in the first round of the IOC voting procedure. In the second and final round, Pyeongchang received 47 votes but Sochi received 51 votes and was therefore chosen as the host of the 2014 Olympics.

== Evaluation of the applicant cities ==
Each cell of the table provides a minimum and a maximum figure obtained by the applicant city on the specific criteria. These figures are to be compared to a benchmark which has been set at 6.

Table of scores given by the IOC Working Group to assess the quality and feasibility of the 2014 Applicant cities
Criteria	Weight	Sochi		Salzburg		Jaca		Almaty		Pyeongchang		Sofia		Borjomi	
Criteria	Weight	RUS		AUT		ESP		KAZ		KOR		BUL		GEO	
Criteria	Weight	Min	Max	Min	Max	Min	Max	Min	Max	Min	Max	Min	Max	Min	Max
Governmental support, legal issues, public opinion	2	6.6	7.5	6.6	7.2	7.3	8.1	4.7	5.9	7.9	8.5	5.1	6.4	4.5	5.6
General infrastructure	5	5.8	6.9	7.8	8.6	4.8	6.0	6.3	7.9	6.4	7.6	4.2	5.3	2.7	4.2
Sport venues	4	5.5	7.1	7.2	8.4	5.0	6.6	4.7	6.9	6.8	8.1	3.6	5.4	3.4	4.9
Olympic Village(s)	3	7.4	8.6	7.9	8.9	4.2	6.5	6.5	8.0	5.2	7.2	4.8	6.5	5.5	7.2
Environmental conditions and impact	2	4.9	6.6	7.8	8.7	5.2	6.6	4.9	6.6	6.4	8.0	2.5	4.5	2.0	4.5
Accommodation	5	7.3	8.3	9.6	9.6	4.3	4.8	4.9	5.9	9.6	9.6	3.9	4.1	3.0	4.1
Transport concept	3	5.9	7.7	7.1	8.6	2.6	4.3	7.6	8.8	6.6	8.0	2.6	4.3	2.2	4.3
Safety and security	3	6.0	6.7	7.6	8.2	6.8	7.3	6.0	6.5	7.4	8.1	4.3	5.3	3.4	4.7
Experience from past sport events	3	5.2	7.2	8.6	9.6	6.8	8.4	3.8	5.4	8.0	9.0	5.4	7.0	2.0	4.0
Finance	3	6.0	6.8	7.0	8.0	6.5	8.0	5.6	6.8	6.2	7.6	4.6	5.8	2.8	3.5
Overall project and legacy	3	5.0	7.0	8.0	9.0	3.0	5.0	4.0	7.0	7.0	8.0	3.0	5.0	2.0	4.0

- Report by the IOC candidature acceptance working group to the IOC Executive Board

== Candidate cities overview ==
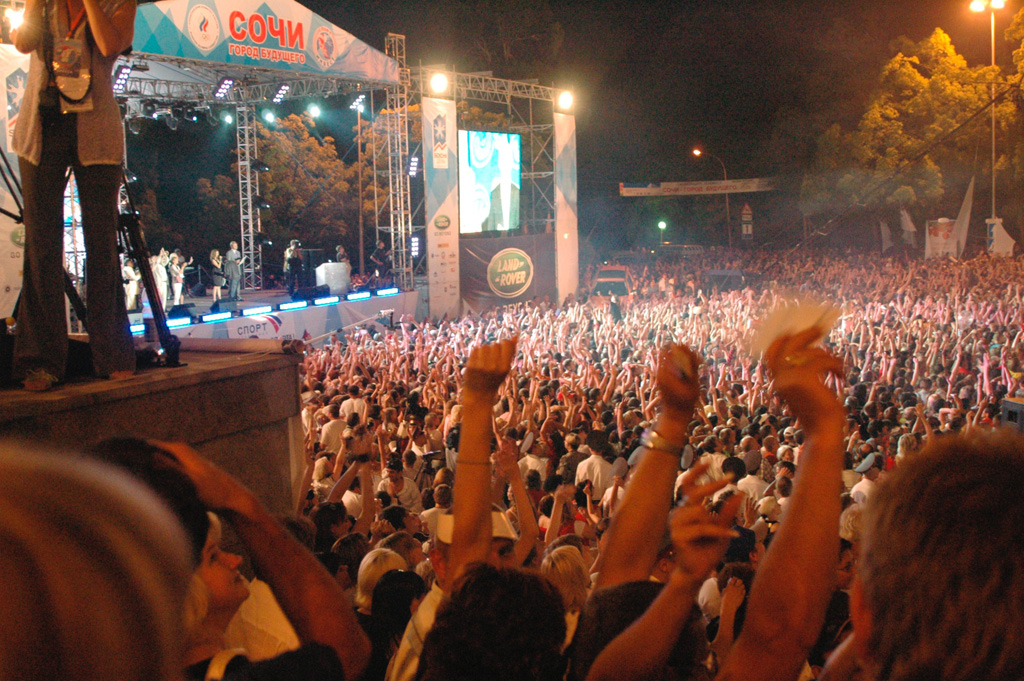
Sochi residents celebrate the IOC's decision to hold the 2014 Winter Olympics in Sochi

All three cities suggested hosting the XXII Olympic Winter Games between 7 and 23 February, and the Paralympics from 7–16 March.

=== Pyeongchang ===
Pyeongchang
- Overview

Details
- Round 1: 36
- Round 2: 47
- Country: South Korea

Pyeongchang was unanimously selected over Muju by the Korean Olympic Committee in December 2004, and was the first city to submit its bid to the International Olympic Committee. The bid launched a full-scale campaign after losing the 2010 race by a mere three votes to Vancouver. The 2014 project concentrated all venues within one hour of Pyeongchang, and called for huge sums of investment into new infrastructure and sporting venues, including the new Alpensia Resort. The sporting event was touted as promoting a message of peace and harmony in the divided country.

Since 2003, the region had been selected to host the 2009 Snowboard World Championships, the 2009 Biathlon World Championships and the 2009 World Women's Curling Championship, and aimed to become the winter sports hub of Asia. Although an IOC evaluation team complimented the area on levels of public support, government support and infrastructure in February 2007, the bid was also criticized because Pyeongchang was not a popular tourist destination, the venue relied heavily on artificial snow due to a dry winter climate, most slopes were relatively short and local amenities were poorly developed. Pyeongchang was eventually chosen to host the 2018 Winter Olympics and the 2024 Winter Youth Olympics.

=== Salzburg ===
Salzburg
- Overview

Details
- Votes: 25
- Country: Austria

The Austrian city was eliminated in the first round in voting during the 2010 competition. The 2014 bid was more compact than the 2010 project due to the elimination of the Kitzbühel, St. Johann and Ramsau venues. The venue for bobsled, skeleton and luge, Schönau am Königssee, was located in Germany.

=== Sochi ===
Sochi
- Overview

Details
- Round 1: 34
- Round 2: 51
- Country: Russia

The Russian Black Sea resort bid for the Winter Olympics for the third time after failing to make the shortlist in 1998 and 2002. The primary venue for outdoor sports was the ski resort in Krasnaya Polyana, which was designed by the same company that worked on ski slopes for the 2010 Winter Olympics, and scheduled to open in 2007. Sochi would host the indoor winter sports. The high number of hotel rooms and strong public and political support from the city were expected to strengthen the bid's chances.

Note: the cities are listed in the presentation order determined by draw during the IOC Executive Board meeting of 26 October 2005.

== Applicant cities overview ==
The following applicant cities were approved by their National Olympic Committees and submitted their applications to the IOC but were not selected as candidates by the executive board. They all sent their respective questionnaire answers by 1 February 2006. These documents were made public in the following days.

2014 non-selected applicant cities
Logo	Name	Country (IOC Country Code)
	Jaca	Spain (ESP)
Jaca has failed four times in bidding for the Winter Olympics—for the 1998, 2002, 2010, and 2014 Olympics. It has previously hosted the 1981 and 1995 Winter Universiades, and hosted the European Youth Olympic Festival in February 2007. Skiing events were proposed to take place at ski resorts of the Pyrenees: Candanchú, Formigal, Astún and Panticosa. Most of the ice events, as well as the opening and closing ceremonies (at La Romareda Stadium), were to take place 142 km (88 mi) south of Jaca in Zaragoza. Preliminary ice hockey competitions were to take place in Jaca and Huesca. Jaca bid for 2002 but missed the short list, which was limited to Östersund (Sweden), Quebec City (Canada), Sion (Switzerland) and Salt Lake City (US), the eventual host. Jaca did not make the short list because the opening and closing ceremonies were not scheduled to take place in Jaca, which is in contradiction with article 34.1 of the Olympic Charter.
	Almaty	Kazakhstan (KAZ)
Main article: Almaty bid for the 2014 Winter Olympics Almaty, Kazakhstan's largest city, submitted its official bid for the 2014 Olympics to the International Olympic Committee. The city had already planned to host the 2011 Winter Asian Games. The National Olympic Committee of the Republic of Kazakhstan cited the city would have used existing indoor sports facilities and the Chimbulak Mountain ski slopes. The bid was quite compact; all of the ice events were to be held in downtown Almaty and the alpine events in nearby Kumbel. The farthest events would have been in the Soldatskoe Valley venue, 45 km (28 miles) away from the center of Almaty and the Olympic Village. The historic Medew ice rink would have been the speed skating venue and would have been covered for the Games. Based on the scores released by the executive committee report, Almaty was placed fourth overall and would have been eligible for the shortlist because it had cleared the benchmark for some categories. However, IOC president Jacques Rogge said in the process of shortlisting to determine an Olympic Host City, what matters is "not quantity, but the quality" of the overall bids. Although Almaty presented a good bid, it was implied it was not at the same standard as the three that were selected to enter the shortlist. After the 2014 setback, Kazakhstan attempts to bid the 2018 Olympics and 2022 Olympics, but was beaten by Pyeongchang, South Korea and Beijing, China in 2011 and 2015.
	Sofia	Bulgaria (BUL)
Sofia submitted its application in the city's third attempt to land the Winter Games after losing the 1992 and 1994 nominations to Albertville and Lillehammer, respectively. The proposed Olympics was based on three main centers; Sofia, Borovets and Bansko. Sofia would have hosted the ice events, bobsleigh and luge events in nearby Vitosha natural park. The ambitious, multi-million-euro Super Borovets 70 kilometres (43 miles) away expansion project would have hosted cross-country skiing, freestyle skiing and snowboarding events. Near Sofia is the fast-developing resort Bansko 159 km (99 miles). Bansko, the site of the 2007 European biathlon championship, would have hosted the biathlon and alpine skiing events. The city's bid also gained significant political support within the country and sent in its application early on 17 April 2004. Sofia missed the 2014 shortlist on 22 June 2006. According to experts, the main reason for the 2014 elimination was the lack of detailed information provided in the reply to the IOC's questionnaire.
	Borjomi	Georgia (GEO)
Despite the lack of sports infrastructure, Georgia reportedly had the money and the will to host the Winter Olympics. The Games were proposed to be held in two locations: Borjomi and Tbilisi, which are about 200 km (120 miles) apart. Borjomi was the proposed venue for the outdoor sports disciplines (Alpine Skiing, Biathlon, Bobsleigh, Cross Country Skiing, Freestyle Skiing, Luge, Nordic Combined, Skeleton, Ski Jumping and Snowboard), while Tbilisi was expected to host the indoor sports disciplines (Curling, Figure Skating, Ice-Hockey, Short Track Speed Skating and Speed Skating). The opening and closing ceremonies were expected to take place in the natural amphitheatre in the center of Bakuriani, a suburb of Borjomi. Bakuriani would also have been the venue for the cross-country and freestyle skiing.

Note: the cities are listed in the presentation order determined by draw during the IOC Executive Board meeting of 26 October 2005.

== Applicant cities comparison ==
2014 applicant cities
Category	Details	Sochi Russia	Salzburg Austria	Jaca Spain	Almaty Kazakhstan	Pyeongchang Korea	Sofia Bulgaria	Borjomi Georgia
Population	City (2005)	333,267	149,997	12,322	1,185,696	45,482	1,090,295	13,725
Population	Country (2005)	143,420,309	8,184,691	40,341,462	15,185,844	48,294,134	7,450,349	4,677,401
Public opinion, support	City	84%	60%	91%	83%	97%	81%	
Public opinion, support	Country	53%	72%		85%	92%	74%	86%
Bid budget (million US$)	Phase I	10.0	2.7	1.3	4.0	5.0	0.5	2.2
Bid budget (million US$)	Phase II	17.5	5.1	10.7	16.0	16.0	12.5	5.0
Main airport, 2005/2014	Name	Sochi International	Salzburg Airport	Zaragoza Airport	Almaty International	Incheon International	Sofia International	Tbilisi International
Main airport, 2005/2014	Distance (km)	6	5	156	22	241	10	203
Main airport, 2005/2014	Runways	2/2	1	2	1/2	2/3	1	2/2
Main airport, 2005/2014	Terminals	1/2	2		1/2		1/2	
Main airport, 2005/2014	Gates	8/27	18	3		44/74	7	2/6
Main airport, 2005/2014	Cap./year			215,213	1,650,000/3,000,000		2,000,000/4,000,000	
Main airport, 2005/2014	Cap./day		40,000					24,000/48,000
Main airport, 2005/2014	Cap./hour	1,200/2,500				12,000/17,253		/2,000
Longest distance*	km	86	83	180	61	124	156	199
Longest distance*	min	94	65	150	93	76	135	196

*Airports not included

Note: the cities are listed in the presentation order defined by the IOC during its Executive Board of 26 October 2005.

== Applicant cities venues list ==
These venues are from the applicant cities' mini bid books. Note that the selected candidate cities, and in particular Sochi, changed their venues plan afterwards in the final proposal to the IOC.

2014 applicant cities
Event	Sochi	Salzburg	Jaca	Almaty	Pyeongchang	Sofia	Borjomi
Dates	7 February; 23 February	7 February; 23 February	31 January; 16 February	7 February; 23 February	7 February; 23 February	10 February; 26 February	7 February; 23 February
Opening and closing ceremonies	Fisht Olympic Stadium	Wals Siezenheim Stadium	La Romareda, Zaragoza	Almaty Central Stadium	Alpensia	Vasil Levski National Stadium	Ceremony Plaza (Bakuriani)
Alpine skiing speed M	Roza Khutor Alpine Resort	Flachauwinkl	Formigal	Shymbulak	Jungbong Alpine Skiing Area	Shiligarnik (Bansko)	Borjomi Didveli; Sakvelo Track
Alpine skiing speed W	Roza Khutor Alpine Resort	Altenmarkt / Zauchensee	Formigal	Shymbulak	Jungbong Alpine Skiing Area	Shiligarnik (Bansko)	Borjomi Didveli; Sakvelo Track
Alpine skiing technical M	Roza Khutor Alpine Resort	Flachau	Candanchú	Shymbulak	Yongpyong Resort	Banderishka Poliana (Bansko)	Borjomi Didveli
Alpine skiing technical W	Roza Khutor Alpine Resort	Flachau	Candanchú	Shymbulak	Yongpyong Resort	Banderishka Poliana (Bansko)	Borjomi Didveli
Cross country skiing	Psekhako Ridge	Radstadt / Altenmarkt	Candanchú	Soldatskoe Valley Cross Country Skiing and Biathlon Stadium	Alpensia	Borovetz	Bakuriani Iagora Valley
Nordic combined C-C	Psekhako Ridge	Bischofshofen	Candanchú	Sunkar International Ski Jumping Complex	Alpensia	Borovetz	Borjomi Kokhtadziri
Freestyle skiing	Laura River Valley Resort	Flachauwinkl	Astún	Shymbulak	Bokwang Phoenix	Cherveno Zname (Borovetz)	Bakuriani Kokhta 2 Tatra Pom
Biathlon	Psekhako Ridge	Radstadt / Altenmarkt	Candanchú	Soldatskoe Valley Cross Country Skiing and Biathlon Stadium	Alpensia	Banderishka Poliana (Bansko)	Borjomi Iagora Valley
Ski jumping	Esto Sadok	Bischofshofen	Canfranc-Estación Jumping Centre	Sunkar International Ski Jumping Complex	Alpensia	Borovetz	Borjomi Kokhtadziri
Snowboard	Alpika Service	Altenmarkt / Zauchensee; Flachau	Panticosa	Shymbulak	Sungwoo Resort	Cherveno Zname (Borovetz)	Bakuriani Kokhta 2 Tatra Pom
Ice Hockey	Sochi Arena; Kudepsta Entertainment Centre	Salzburg Volksgarten; Salzburg Wals	Jaca Ice Pavilion; Huesca Sports Palace; Zaragoza Ice Pavilion	Almaty Olympic Ice Park	Wonju Sports Complex; Wonju Halla University	Winter Sports Palace; West Park Sports Center (Sofia)	Tbilisi Makhata Hill Arenas
Speed skating	Adler Commercial Centre	Salzburg Liefering Oval	Jaca High Performance Winter Sports Centre	Medeo	Gangneung	East Park National Olympic Center (Sofia)	Tbilisi Central Stadium
Figure skating	Imeretinskaya Exhibition Centre	Salzburg Liefering	Príncipe Felipe Pavilion, Zaragoza	Almaty Olympic Ice Park	Gangneung	East Park National Olympic Center (Sofia)	Tbilisi Sport Palace
Short track	Imeretinskaya Exhibition Centre	Salzburg Liefering	Príncipe Felipe Pavilion, Zaragoza	Almaty Olympic Ice Park	Gangneung	East Park National Olympic Center (Sofia)	Tbilisi Sport Palace
Curling	Imeretinskaya Exhibition Centre	Salzburg Arena	Zaragoza Sports Palace	Baluan Sholak Sports Palace	Gangneung	Sofia	Tbilisi Makhata Hill
Bobsleigh/luge/skeleton	National Sliding Centre	Schönau am Königsee (Germany)	Panticosa Sliding Centre	Almatau	Sungwoo Resort	Boiana Center	Borjomi Tskhratskaro

== Potential bids ==
The following cities expressed interest in bidding but withdrew their 2014 Winter Olympics bids or decided not to bid.

- Andorra la Vella, Andorra – No backing by the Andorran Olympic Committee for 2014 bid
- Annecy, France – No backing by the French Olympic Committee after Paris lost its 2012 bid.
- Erzurum, Turkey – The National Olympic Committee of Turkey cited a lack of infrastructure. Erzurum had organized the 2011 Winter Universiade.
- Harbin, China – Investment has been poured into the 2009 Winter Universiade
- Munich, Germany – National Olympic Committee for Germany cited lack of detail and planning
- Östersund, Sweden – Lack of Swedish political support
- Quebec City, Quebec, Canada – Discussed making a bid for these games before Vancouver was chosen to hold the 2010 Olympic Winter Games
- Reno and Lake Tahoe, Nevada, United States of America – No backing by the United States Olympic Committee
- Tromsø, Norway – The Norwegian government did not guarantee money to the bid
- Zürich, Switzerland – Withdrew their bid on 14 September 2004

== Votes results of the 2014 Winter Olympics and Winter Paralympics ==
Four years earlier, Pyeongchang led the first ballot but was defeated in the second one, then losing to Vancouver, British Columbia. Both votes although four years apart bore a remarkable similarity.

There were two rounds of voting at the session that decided which city would host the games. In the first round, Pyeongchang received 36 votes while Sochi received 34 votes. Salzburg was eliminated with only 25 votes. In the second round of voting, Pyeongchang garnered 47 votes but Sochi received most of the votes originally cast for Salzburg and gained 51 votes, winning the bid for the 2014 Winter Olympics.

2014 Winter Olympics bidding results
candidate City	NOC	Round 1	Round 2
Sochi	Russia	34	51
Pyeongchang	South Korea	36	47
Salzburg	Austria	25	—

== See also ==
- 2010 Winter Olympics bids
