= Almaty bid for the 2014 Winter Olympics =

2014 Winter Olympics bid by Almaty, Kazakhstan

Bids for the 2014 Winter Olympics and Paralympics
Overview
- XXII Olympic Winter Games; XI Paralympic Winter Games
- Winner: Sochi; Shortlist: Pyeongchang · Salzburg

Details
- City: Almaty, Kazakhstan
- NOC: National Olympic Committee of the Republic of Kazakhstan (KAZ)

Previous Games hosted
- None

Decision
- Result: Not shortlisted

Almaty 2014 (Kazakh: Алматы 2014) was one of the seven original bids for the 2014 Games, presented by the city of Almaty, Kazakhstan. It was the city's first bid for an Olympic Games.

== Bid details ==
=== Government and public support and legal issues ===
All of the associated public authorities in Kazakhstan, at national, regional and local tiers, supported the bid, including the President of Kazakhstan, Nursultan Nazarbaev. The bid committee confirmed that no new laws or amendments were needed in order to host the Games. Public support was high, with 82.8% of people in Almaty city, 93.5% in the Almaty region and 84.9% nationally saying they would support the bid.

The IOC gave the city a minimum grade of 4.7 and a maximum grade of 5.9 for this criterion, the second lowest after Borjomi and below the required grade of a 6.

=== General infrastructure ===
The planned improvement to transport included new subway and light rail lines, a new city ring-road and additional roads connecting venues. These proposed improvements would cost a total of $8.7 billion with 93% of the cost in the expansion of the railways. Almaty International Airport was to be doubled in capacity and was assessed as being able to meet the needs of the Winter Olympics. Almaty's telecommunications network, however, was classed as "less advanced" according to an IOC commissioned IDATE report.

The IOC gave the city a minimum grade of 6.3 and a maximum of 7.9 for this criterion, the second best after Salzburg.

=== Sports Venues ===
Almaty had six existing venues, with 8 other planned sites. The upgrade of the existing venues alone was estimated to cost $353 million but the bid showed this as part of the post-Olympic legacy and aimed to become a "new winter sports destination for Central Asia".

The IOC gave the city a minimum grade of 4.7 and a maximum of 6.9 for this criterion, below the required grade of a 6.

=== Olympic Villages ===
The Almaty bid consisted of two Olympic Villages, 45 km apart: one in Almaty with 5000 beds, the other in the Soldatskoe Valley with 800 beds and meant only to house the cross-country and biathlon athletes. Both the villages were proposed to be built as a joint venture between the cities of Almaty and Talgar and private firms. After the Games, the apartments at the Almaty Village would be sold to public buyers and those in the Soldatskoe Valley Village retained to provide additional tourist accommodation at the existing ski resort.

Almaty scored a minimum of 6.5 and maximum of 8.0 for this criterion, coming third behind Sochi and Salzburg.

=== Environmental conditions and impact ===
Almaty's bid proposed the use of the nearby Zailiskii Alatau mountains, where snowy conditions are consistent and stable. The bid also sought to combat the air pollution around the city, halving it by 2010 and 15% of the total venue budget would be spent on environmental and sustainability efforts.

The IOC awarded the city a minimum grade of 4.9 and maximum of 6.6 for this criterion, placing it equal with Sochi but behind Jaca, Salzburg and Pyeongchang.

=== Accommodation ===
Almaty's 4,029 existing hotel rooms at the time, were not enough for an Olympic Games. In order to increase the capacity sufficiently, the bid planned the construction of 14172 extra hotel rooms as well as a media village of 10000 rooms. Both the bid committee and the IOC recognised that the increase would be a challenge to complete on time.

The IOC gave Almaty a minimum score of 4.9 and a maximum score of 5.9 for this criterion, both of which are below the required grade of a 6. Almaty ranked fourth on accommodation, above Sofia, Borjomi and Jaca.

=== Transport ===
Almaty's transport concept for the Games was praised by the IOC for being "simple" and "coherent", with the travel times between venues and the Olympic Park relatively short, thanks to the efficient road and rail networks.

Almaty was awarded a minimum grade of 7.6 and a maximum of 8.8, placing it above every other applicant city.

== See also ==
- Bids for the 2014 Winter Olympics
