= Annecy bid for the 2018 Winter Olympics =

Bids for the 2018 Winter Olympics and Paralympics
Overview
- XXIII Olympic Winter Games; XII Paralympic Winter Games
- Winner: Pyeongchang; Runner-up: Munich; Shortlist: Annecy

Details
- City: Annecy, France
- NOC: French Olympic Committee

Previous Games hosted
- None

Decision
- Result: 7 votes (Third place)

Annecy 2018 (Arpitan: Èneci 2018 or Ènneci 2018) was an unsuccessful bid by Annecy, France, for the 2018 Winter Olympics.

== Overview ==
At first, the French Olympic Committee (CNOSF) was quite reluctant in bidding for a Winter Games, preferring to focus on a bid for the 2024 Summer Olympics. However, four cities (Annecy, Grenoble, Nice and Pelvoux) expressed interest in hosting the 2018 games. On September 24, 2008, the Olympic Committee announced it had granted these wishes and would bid in 2011. Annecy was elected as the official candidate city by the French NOC on March 18, 2009. The CNOSF acknowledged its tough competition, but intended to learn from the failure of Paris to secure the 2012 Summer Olympics with victory in Annecy, maintaining a humble approach.

Previous bid head Edgar Grospiron, Olympic skiing champion, stated, "we have exceptional, spectacular scenery with Mount Blanc, economic strength with one million tourists every year, and so we believe that our bid is credible. We want to invite the world to a party in a world famous resort". Grospiron was being assisted by IOC members and former Olympians Jean-Claude Killy and Guy Drut. However, his demission on December 12, 2010 raised questions on the viability of the bid. On January 10, 2011, Charles Beigbeder was named as the new CEO for the Annecy bid. In addition, Olympic champions Jean-Pierre Vidal and Pernilla Wiberg were appointed as Vice Presidents of the bid. Beigbeder said he would seek more financial support for the bid from the private sector. Also announced with Beigbeder's appointment was the selection of Pierre Mirabaud as Director General of the bid. Mirabaud had been a regional government prefect, experience which Beigbeder said was needed by the bid.

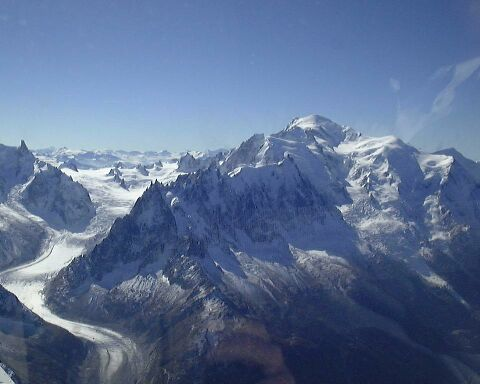
Mont Blanc, near Annecy

On February 12, 2011, the IOC evaluation commission completed its four-day inspection of the Annecy bid. During a brief press conference, commission chair Gunilla Lindberg was cautious in her praise of Annecy. On a positive note, she told reporters: "We have during our visit witnessed very strong governmental support which the bid enjoys and this was highlighted by the presence of the President Sarkozy and many members of his cabinet throughout the visit. I think the bid committee of Annecy has listened to the comments made by the IOC [criticism of the spread-out venues in June] and there has been a big improvement, especially not having so many competition venues as was proposed." But there was no glowing assessment of the Annecy bid from Lindberg. The Swedish IOC member also gave no clue about any concerns that had arisen during the inspection team's four-day stay in the French Alpine town.

French President Nicolas Sarkozy also travelled to Annecy to meet with the IOC Evaluation Commission inspecting the city's bid for the 2018 Winter Olympic Games. "The government will do everything possible, you can be sure, so that Annecy, applicant for the 2018 Winter Olympics, will be chosen," Sarkozy said. "Annecy's victory will be the victory of the entire nation, standing behind you." While pledging his support for the bid he said "you are trying hard. It's difficult. Your opponents are extremely powerful but I'm with you. If we win the Games it will be fantastic. And if we don't win, all we did will be useful for your cities and your region".

The territory that was proposed to host the Games is concentrated in Annecy and Mont Blanc where 65% of the venues were already built and "the world's leading winter sports destination". In a reference to difficult snow conditions at the 2010 Winter Olympics, organizers made a guarantee of snow in Pays de Savoie where the average snowfall in February is 80 cm. Annecy is a smaller city, so the whole department of Haute-Savoie would have been used, including world-famous ski resorts like Chamonix, Megève, La Clusaz, Morzine and Le Grand Bornand. Spread over an area with a 50 km radius, everything is within an hour of Annecy, and two Olympic villages were planned., Of the 13 venues, six venues would have required permanent upgrades, two new venues were already planned to be built, and four other venues would have been built if the Games were hosted in Annecy. Sliding events would have been at La Plagne, the same facilities that were used for the 1992 Winter Olympics in Albertville and which were upgraded in 2008.

However, in June 2010, the IOC criticized Annecy's bid stating that the competition venues were excessively dispersed. The IOC report was highly critical over the original venue plan, saying it would "present major operational and financial challenges" that would "affect the Games experience for all client groups, particularly athletes". On October 4, 2010 Annecy's leaders unveiled a new "ultra-compact" venue concept in response to the IOC concerns. Under the reworked venue plans, all ice and snow events would take place within a 21-mile radius at two main bases, Annecy and Chamonix, which are less than an hour apart and linked by motorway and the "Games Train". All alpine skiing would take place in Chamonix, which would also host ice hockey. All freestyle skiing and snowboard were centered on Annecy. Curling was relocated to Annecy, the hub of most ice sports, meaning that the Olympic Village would have been a little bigger than previously, to accommodate 2,500 athletes and officials. The revised bid moved the second Olympic Village (1,500 beds) from the Mont Blanc valley into the center of Chamonix, which hosted the first Winter Olympics, in 1924.

On March 28, 2011, the CAO (Annecy Anti-Olympic Committee) stated that it wanted to tell people about what "not only the excesses of the Olympics, the sport business, the financial stakes of multinationals and unacceptable demands of the IOC, but also on adverse impacts on the environment and on uncontrolled public spending with long-term debt for the Olympic city". The group said it had collected 13,140 names for its petition opposing plans to bring the Winter Olympics to Annecy. In a press release issued on the 28th, the opposition group cited information reported exclusively by media outlet Around the Rings that an IOC poll showed only 51 percent of the local population supports the Annecy candidacy.

Bid costs were US$ 21 million. Venue construction was set for $419 million and transport/infrastructure costs (including some already planned and some dependent on the Games) was $2.1 billion. Among the transport costs were a new high-capacity gondola connection between Flaine and Mont-Blanc, and a train link. The nearest airport service would have been in Lyon and Geneva (35 minutes by car).Public support for the bid was 88% across France and 81% in the Annecy region.

Annecy's logo featured the French Alps, specifically Mont Blanc, as well as suggesting the letter "A" for Annecy.

== Venues ==
Annecy Cluster

Annecy Olympic Stadium – opening and closing ceremonies

Mont Blanc – Ski Jumping, Alpine Skiing, Nordic Combined, Cross Country Skiing

Patinoire Jean Régis – Speed Skating

Le Grand Bornand – Biathlon

Chamonix Cluster

Piste de Bobsleigh des Pellerins – Bobsleigh, Luge and Skeleton

Stade Olympique de Chamonix – Curling, Ice Hockey

== Aftermath ==
Six years after Annecy's defeat in the race for the 2018 Olympics, Paris won the right to host the 2024 Summer Olympics in 2017. The 2024 Olympics is the first Olympics to be held in France since Albertville hosted the 1992 Winter Olympics. The country successfully bid to host the winter games in 2030, this time in the French Alps. This success is bringing the Winter Olympics home to its birthplace after 38 years.

== See also ==
- 2018 Winter Olympics
- Pyeongchang bid for the 2018 Winter Olympics
- Bids for the 2018 Winter Olympics
