= Zapatilla =

Zapatilla is a Spanish word for slippers or sneakers.

Zapatilla may also refer to:

- Zapatilla (mountain), a peak in the Pyrenees mountain
- Cayos Zapatilla, islands of Panama
- Biscúter
