= Aspe peak =

Mountain in Spain

Aspe
- Pico de la Garganta de Aísa
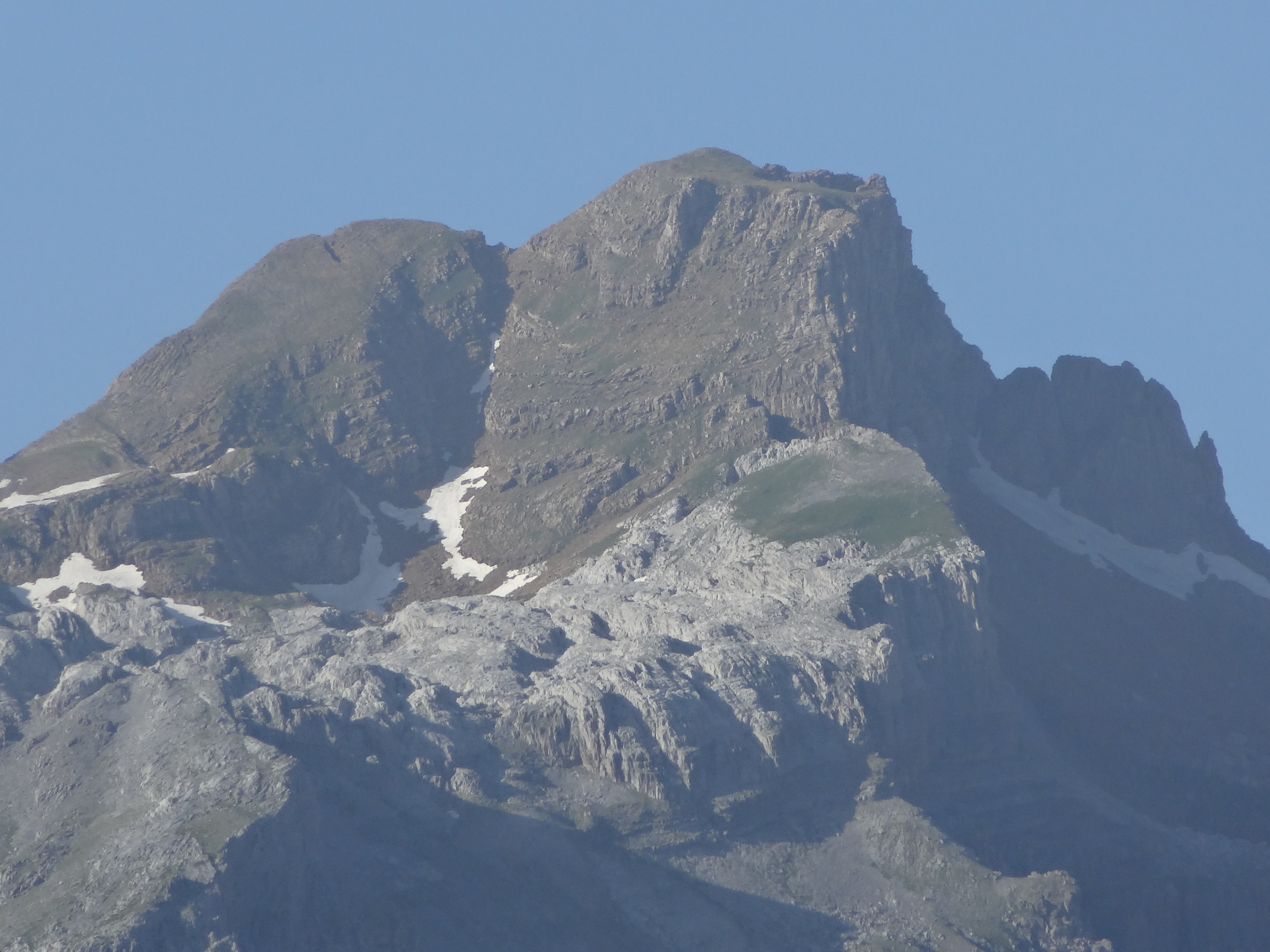
- Aspe from Aísa

Highest point
- Elevation: 2,645 m (8,678 ft)
- Isolation: 6.56 km (4.08 mi)
- Listing: Mountains of Spain
- Coordinates: 42°46′N 0°35′E

Naming
- Language of name: Spanish

Geography
- Location within Pyrenees
- Location: Province of Huesca, Spain
- Parent range: Pyrenees

Climbing
- First ascent: Unknown
- Easiest route: From Candanchú

Aspe peak (also known as Pico de la Garganta de Aísa) is a mountain in the western Pyrenees of Huesca; which is situated on the west side of the Aragon Valley near the towns of Villanúa (to the south) and Canfranc (to the east). The peak is 2,645 metres (8,678 ft) AMSL high. It is adjoined to the peak of Zapatilla.

The peak towers over the Spanish ski resort of Candanchú and the Somport pass on the border with France. The peak gives its name to the French river Gave d'Aspe and the Aspe Valley.

== Ascent routes ==
- The south-western route: Refugio de Rigüelo - brecha de Aspe - western side - summit (1180 metres of ascent, 3h 20min).
- Normal way from the northeast, from Candanchú.
