= Pyeongchang bid for the 2018 Winter Olympics =

Bids for the 2018 Winter Olympics and Paralympics
Overview
- XXIII Olympic Winter Games; XII Paralympic Winter Games
- Winner: Pyeongchang; Runner-up: Munich; Shortlist: Annecy

Details
- City: Pyeongchang, South Korea
- NOC: Korean Olympic Committee

Previous Games hosted
- None

Decision
- Result: 63 votes (Winner)

PyeongChang 2018 was the successful bid to host the 2018 Winter Olympics, to be held in Pyeongchang.

== Overview ==
After losing the bids for the 2010 and 2014 Winter Olympics, Gangwon Province Governor Jin-sun Kim announced in September 2007 that Pyeongchang would bid for a third time. He cited increased knowledge of the bidding process and the enthusiasm of residents as reasons to keep trying. According to a survey by The Chosun Ilbo on December 23, 2009, 91.4% of Koreans, 93.4% of Pyeongchang and Jeongseon residents, and 93% of Gangwon residents supported the 2018 Winter Olympics bid. Cho Yang-ho, Chairman of Hanjin Group, was appointed as the bid committee chairman in 2009, and successfully won the bid in 2011. South Korea's figure skating superstar and 2010 Olympic champion Kim Yuna and IOC member and Samsung Group chairman Lee Kun-hee promoted the bid. The Samsung Chairman and principal owner Lee Kun-hee, given a 3-year suspended sentence for tax evasion and illegal bond dealing, was reportedly pardoned by the South Korean president Lee Myung-bak with the hope that his connections and financial support would boost the chances of Pyeongchang.

On February 16, 2011, the IOC Evaluation Commission arrived in Korea for inspection of Pyeongchang’s bid. "We have seen great progress in the bid from the two previous bids," commission chairwoman Gunilla Lindberg said. "We have also seen progress in Korean winter sports during the last four years." Speaking at the IOC news conference following the inspection of Pyeongchang and venues in Gangwon Province, Lindberg said "I must also mention the passionate support of Gangwon residents. During our site visits it has been wonderful to see so many people to show their support to bring the Olympic Movement to Korea."

Seven venues had been built since the previous bids, including ski jumping slopes, and biathlon and cross-country skiing courses. Pyeongchang would be a compact Olympic Games, with travel times of less than 30 minutes between the main accommodation in Alpensia resort and the venues and 10 minutes between venues. A new 250 km per hour KTX line will be built between Seoul and Wonju via Pyeongchang putting Pyeongchang within 50 minutes of Seoul.

German reporter Dietmar Gessner from Sport Bild said that "in Asia including Korea you can create more customers. You can make lots of money for winter sports.."

Pyeongchang’s slogan is “New Horizons.” The bid's logo suggests the winter scenery of Pyeongchang with snow on the mountains. The curve implies a will to win and symbolizes a snowboard and slope of winter sports.

== See also ==
- Pyeongchang bid for the 2014 Winter Olympics
- 2018 Winter Olympics
- Bids for the 2018 Winter Olympics
