= Pyeongchang bid for the 2014 Winter Olympics =

Bids for the 2014 Winter Olympics and Paralympics
Overview
- XXII Olympic Winter Games; XI Paralympic Winter Games
- Winner: Sochi; Runner-up: Pyeongchang; Shortlist: Salzburg

Details
- City: Pyeongchang, South Korea
- NOC: Korean Olympic Committee

Previous Games hosted
- None

Decision
- Result: Second place

Pyeongchang 2014 was an unsuccessful bid by the Korean Olympic Committee to host the 2014 Winter Olympics and 2014 Winter Paralympics in Pyeongchang, South Korea. Pyeongchang was one of seven applicants for the games, and one of three to be short-listed, along with Sochi, Russia, and Salzburg, Austria.

The bid was the second consecutive time Pyeongchang bid for the Olympics, following its close-call 2010 bid. The 2014 project concentrated all venues within one hour of Pyeongchang, called for huge sums of investment into new infrastructure and sporting venues, including the new Alpensia Resort; moreover, the sporting event would promote a message of peace and harmony in the divided nation. Since 2003, the region was selected to host the 2009 Mount Titlis World Women's Curling Championship and the FIS Snowboarding World Championships 2009 in Gangwon, the 2009 Biathlon World Championships 2009 in Pyeongchang, in an aim at becoming the winter sports hub of Asia. Although an International Olympic Committee evaluation team complimented the area on levels of public support, government support, and infrastructure in February 2007, Pyeongchang is not a popular tourist destination for foreign skiers, snow machines are heavily relied on due to South Korea's dry winter climate, most slopes in the area's two ski resorts are relatively short, amenities and entertainment facilities in the surrounding area are relatively undeveloped, and "the runs are blocked off in a way that it is tough to find a place to take a mid-slope pee in the woods," causing some to question Pyeongchang's ability to successfully host the Winter Olympics.

== See also ==
- Bids for the 2010 Winter Olympics
- Pyeongchang bid for the 2010 Winter Olympics
- Pyeongchang bid for the 2018 Winter Olympics
- 2018 Winter Olympics
