= Munich bid for the 2018 Winter Olympics =

Bids for the 2018 Winter Olympics and Paralympics
Overview
- XXIII Olympic Winter Games; XII Paralympic Winter Games
- Winner: Pyeongchang; Runner-up: Munich; Shortlist: Annecy

Details
- City: Munich, Germany
- NOC: Deutscher Olympischer Sportbund

Previous Games hosted
- 1972 Summer Olympics; Germany hosted the 1936 Winter Olympics

Decision
- Result: 25 votes (Second place)

Munich 2018 (German: München 2018; Bavarian: Minga 2018) was an unsuccessful bid by Munich, Germany for the 2018 edition of the Winter Olympic Games.

== Overview ==
Munich hosted the 1972 Summer Olympics, and if selected would have been the first city to host both the Summer and Winter Games and as well would have been the first time since the 1936 Summer Olympics in a single German nation following reunification, but that honor went to Beijing four years later. Berlin and Hamburg were considering a summer games bid for 2024 or 2028, but the German Olympic Committee put priority on the Munich bid. After Salzburg's failure to capture the 2014 bid, Germany felt it has a better chance and would have preferred the Olympics sooner rather than later. Munich's bid head was figure skating superstar Katarina Witt, replacing skiing star/filmmaker/entrepreneur Willy Bogner, Jr. who had to step down for health reasons.

Munich stressed an environmental approach and would have used existing venues in Munich (some from the 1972 Games), and existing venues in the Bavarian mountain resorts of Garmisch-Partenkirchen (location of the 1936 Winter Olympics) and Schönau am Königssee, an hour away by car. Fifteen competition venues were proposed – eight exist, three would have required construction and four would have been temporary. To take environmental responsibility, new venue construction would be on existing sites in order to minimize land use. Ice events would have been held in Munich in addition to the existing Olympic Stadium for ceremonies. The Olympic swimming pool would have been adapted into a curling venue, figure skating and short track would have been at Olympic hall, a hockey arena would have been on the site of the old cycling stadium, and a second ice hockey arena and a speed skating oval would have been dismantled and used elsewhere after the Games. Garmisch-Partenkirchen Snow Park would have housed nine snow venues, Both locations would have had Olympic villages. In the district of Berchtesgadener Land, located in close proximity of the border to Salzburg, Austria, the historic Koenigssee Sliding Center was renovated for the World Championships in 2011 for hosting bobsleigh, luge and skeleton.

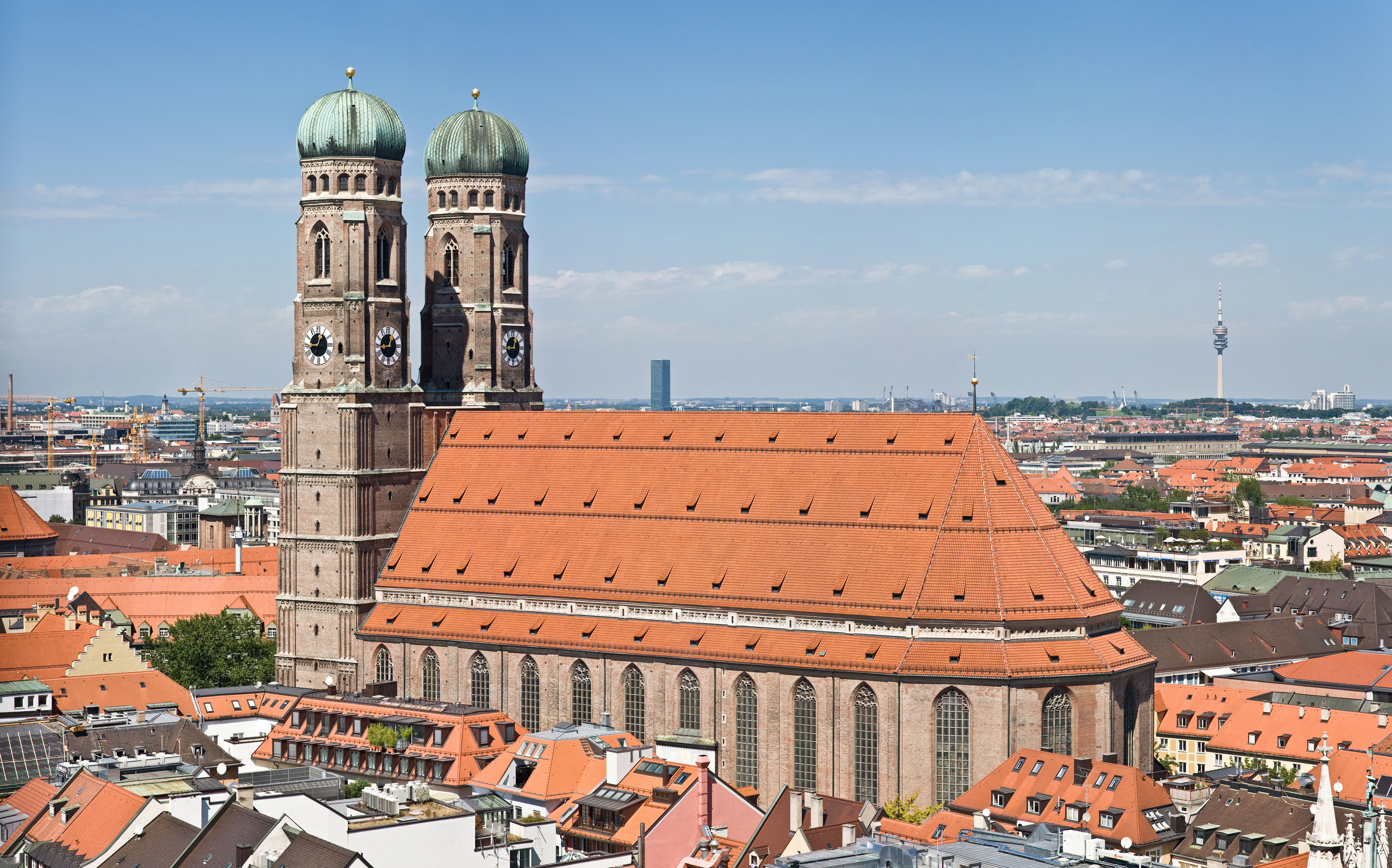
Central Munich with the Olympicpark in the far background

The Green Party and several ecological associations opposed the bid. Arguments included the lack of natural snow, the environmental costs of artificial snow, using green land for temporary sites, road construction projects that would have caused a lasting increase of transit traffic, the financial risk, and the imposition of unnegotiable clauses by the IOC. As these points received increasing attention, public support for the bid diminished. While a 2009 poll gave 75.5% support of Munich residents and 68% across Germany, in spring 2010 these numbers were down to 69% and 64%, respectively. The bid proved highly divisive in Garmisch-Partenkirchen, where more than 50 farmers refused to allow the use of their grounds. Before, similar refusal of farmers to cooperate had forced the planners to abandon Oberammergau as site of the Nordic competitions. As a replacement, a state-owned stud near Ohlstadt was chosen, which is located 200 meters lower than Oberammergau and more often than not is snow free in February.

On February 22, 2011, land owners in Garmisch-Partenkirchen supporting the 'Nolympia' initiative began collecting signatures under efforts to force a vote to decide whether the town would back the bid. "The Olympic Winter Games are too big for Garmisch-Partenkirchen. With more than fifty events in the snow cluster there are almost five times as many events as the world ski championships," said Nolympia backer Axel Doering. "Our goal is to win a referendum, so that the contracts be reviewed. Another goal is to finally show that the alleged "huge majority" [of support] for the Olympic Winter Games is a myth," he added. Munich's bid plans called for the leasing of land from private land owners for the Games. The then-German Olympic committee President Thomas Bach said complaints by landowners in Garmisch-Partenkirchen were not a problem for the bid. "It's not a problem at all because for the field of play, it's one piece of land with 800 square meters. The piece of land was there for the alpine world championships six weeks before," said Bach. He added "we have seen this at the world championships they were all going down on this very slope and they will go down in 2018, hopefully."

On February 28, 2011, the IOC evaluation commission traveled to Munich and to the other cities, in which competitions would be held. The 1972 Olympic Stadium in Garmisch-Partenkirchen was the high point of the IOC's tour. IOC Evaluation Commission chair Gunilla Lindberg said her inspection team had "absolutely felt the atmosphere and passion" for the Olympics at the end of its four-day inspection of the Munich bid. "The general impression is that it is a strong bid with strong governmental support. It is a good team on the bid committee and Germany is a big winter sports country used to organizing competitions." The then-IOC vice-president Thomas Bach insisted that 2018 was a good time for the IOC and Olympic Movement to bring the Games to the traditional winter sports city of Munich to "recharge the batteries after having been to new regions, with 2014 to Sochi and 2016 to Rio". German chancellor Angela Merkel said Munich had a "very good chance" of winning the race to host the 2018 Winter Olympics. She added, "The world can look forward to Germany hosting the Olympic and Paralympic Winter Games 2018."

In addition to Germany’s historical strength in winter sports, the bid was supported by former figure skater Katarina Witt, alpine skier Maria Riesch, and biathlete Magdalena Neuner.[1][2][3] Within the International Olympic Committee (IOC), Munich was considered to have support from IOC Vice President Thomas Bach, although the extent of his influence on the vote was uncertain.[4] Munich had also considered a bid for the 2022 Winter Olympics prior to the failure of its 2018 bid.[5]

Organizers budgeted US$42 million for the bid and US$331 million for venues with $143 million budgeted for an ice hockey arena. $743 million was allotted for new and planned transportation improvements.

The slogan of the Games was Die Spiele im Herzen (The games at heart) and it was also being tagged as "the friendly Games". The logo was a stylized M, reminiscent of the Bavarian mountain silhouettes as well as the awnings in Munich's Olympic Park.

== See also ==
- 2018 Winter Olympics
- Pyeongchang bid for the 2018 Winter Olympics
- Bids for the 2018 Winter Olympics
- Beijing bid for the 2022 Winter Olympics
