= Ibón de Truchas =

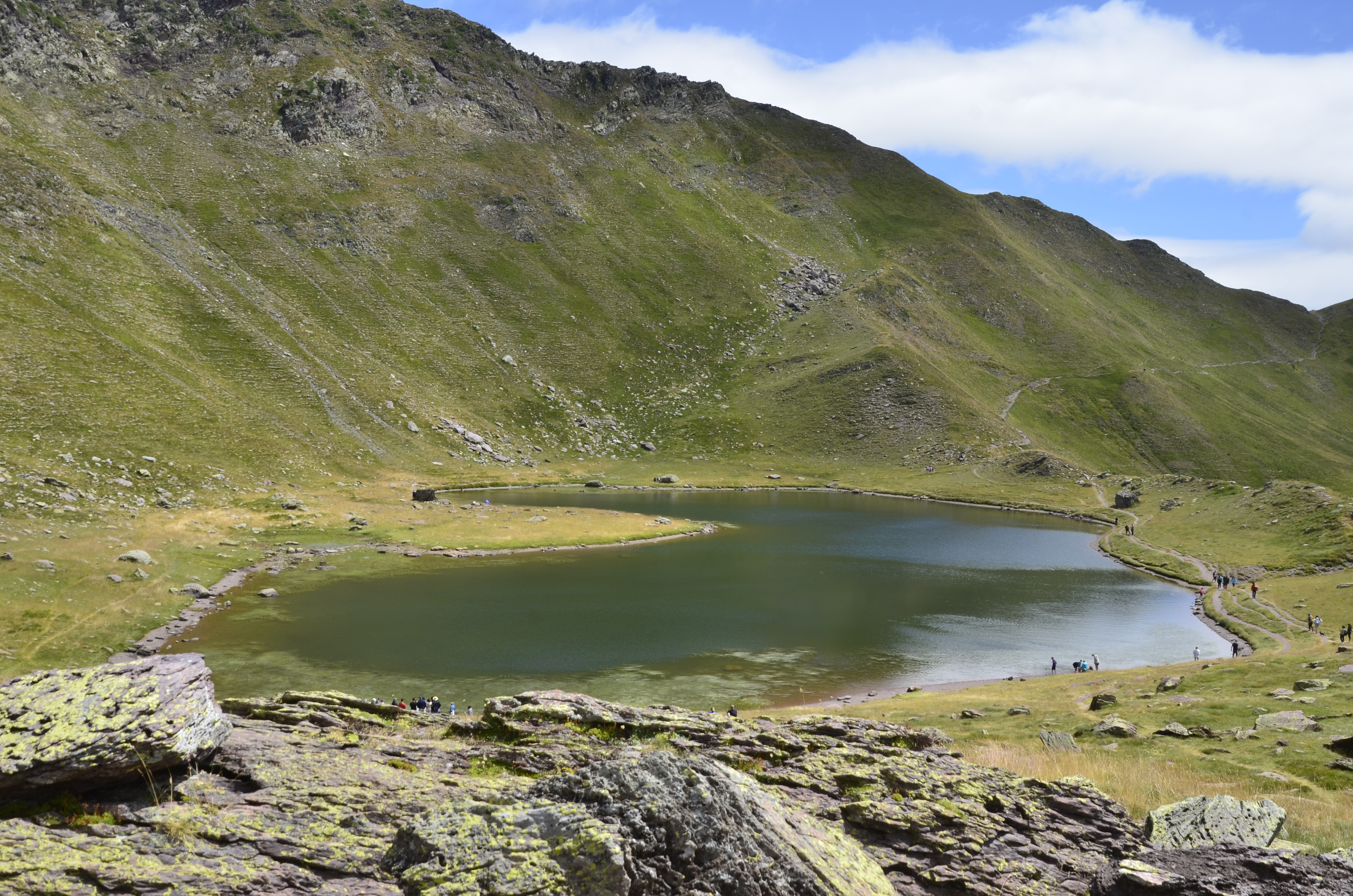

- Location within Spain
- Location: Province of Huesca, northeastern Spain
- Coordinates: 42.8144°N 0.4883°W
- Type: lake
- Max. depth: 4.7 metres (15 ft)
- Surface elevation: 2,144 metres (7,034 ft)

Ibón de Truchas is a lake at the winter resort of Astún in the Province of Huesca, northeastern Spain. It lies at an elevation of 2,144 metres (7,034 ft) and has a maximum depth of 4.7 metres (15 ft). It is a popular place for fishing and hiking.
