= Bids for the 2018 Winter Olympics =

Bids for the 2018 Winter Olympics and Paralympics
Overview
- XXIII Olympic Winter Games; XII Paralympic Winter Games
- Winner: Pyeongchang; Runner-up: Munich; Shortlist: Annecy

Details
- Committee: IOC

Map of the bidding cities
- Missing location of the bidding cities

Important dates
- Bid: 15 October 2009
- Decision: 6 July 2011

Decision
- Winner: Pyeongchang (63 votes)
- Runner-up: Munich (25 votes)

Three cities applied with bids to host the 2018 Winter Olympics and Paralympics (also known as XXIII Olympic Winter Games and XII Paralympic Winter Games) in October 2009. The International Olympic Committee, under the leadership of Jacques Rogge, received three bids on 15 October 2009. The cities of Annecy, France, in the French Alps, Munich, Germany (host of the 1972 Summer Olympics), and Pyeongchang, South Korea, a two-time previous bidder, competed for the hosting rights to the event. This was the lowest number of bidding cities since the 1988 Summer Olympics, coincidentally also won by South Korea. The winning bid was announced on 6 July 2011, at the 123rd IOC Session in Durban, South Africa by IOC President Jacques Rogge at 5.22 pm local time Pyeongchang beat Munich and Annecy in the first round of votes with 63 of the 95 total votes.

== Bidding calendar ==
- 31 July 2009 – IOC invited bid applicants from NOCs.
- 15 October 2009 – Application Deadline
- 2–5 December 2009 – Applicant City Seminar – IOC Headquarters – Lausanne, Switzerland
- 15 March 2010 – Application Files Due
- 22 June 2010 – Candidate City Selection
- 11 January 2011 – Submission of candidature files and guarantees
- February – March 2011 – Evaluation Commission Site Visits
- 10 May 2011 – Evaluation Commission Report Released
- 18–29 May 2011 – Bid cities briefing, Lausanne
- 6 July 2011 – Winner Announced at 123rd IOC Session – Durban, South Africa

== Applicant cities venues list ==
These venues are from the applicant cities' mini bid books. Note that the selected candidate cities, and in particular Annecy, have changed their venues plan afterwards in the final proposal to the IOC.

2018 applicant cities
Event	Pyeongchang	Munich	Annecy
Slogan	"New Horizons"	"A Festival of Friendship"	"Snow, ice and you!" (French: "La neige, la glace et vous!")
Opening and closing ceremonies	Alpensia Ski Jumping Stadium (50,000)	Bayern Olympiastadion (50,000)	Ceremonial Plaza (Lac d'Annecy)
Alpine skiing speed M	Jungbong	Garmisch-Partenkirchen	Chamonix-Mont-Blanc
Alpine skiing speed W	Jungbong	Garmisch-Partenkirchen	Chamonix
Alpine skiing technical M	Yongpyong Ski Resort	Garmisch-Partenkirchen	Chamonix
Alpine skiing technical W	Yongpyong Ski Resort	Garmisch-Partenkirchen	Chamonix
Cross country skiing	Alpensia	Berchtesgaden	La Clusaz
Nordic combined C-C	Alpensia	Berchtesgaden	La Clusaz
Freestyle skiing	Bokwang	Zwiesel	Annecy
Biathlon	Alpensia	Ruhpolding	Le Grand-Bornand
Ski jumping	Alpensia	Oberstdorf	La Clusaz
Snowboard	Bokwang	Zwiesel	Annecy
Hockey	Union Hockey Arena; Kwandong	Munchen Eishalle; Olympia Eishalle	Chamonix; Courchevel
Speed skating	Science Oval	Eisstadion Inzell, Inzell	Annecy Oval
Figure skating	Gyeongpo	Olympiahalle	Annecy Arena
Short track	Gyeongpo	Olympiahalle	Annecy Arena
Curling	Gangneung Ice Arena; Gangneung	Olympia Sports Hall	Annecy
Bobsleigh/luge/skeleton	Alpensia National Sliding Centre	Schönau am Königsee	La Plagne

== Evaluation of the applicant cities ==
Each cell of the table provides a minimum and a maximum figure obtained by the applicant city on the specific criteria. These figures are to be compared to a benchmark which has been set at 6.

Table of scores given by the IOC Working Group to assess the quality and feasibility of the 2018 Applicant cities
Criteria	Weight	Munich		Annecy		Pyeongchang	
Criteria	Weight	GER		FRA		KOR	
Criteria	Weight	Min	Max	Min	Max	Min	Max
Governmental support, legal issues, public opinion	2	7.5	8.5	6.9	8.6	8.4	9.0
General infrastructure	5	8.0	9.0	5.4	6.9	6.7	8.0
Sport venues	4	7.0	8.6	5.6	6.9	6.8	8.5
Olympic Village(s)	3	6.2	7.6	4.5	5.8	6.2	7.9
Environmental conditions and impact	2	7.8	8.8	6.6	7.9	7.2	8.5
Accommodation	5	9.3	9.8	6.1	7.2	9.3	9.8
Transport concept	3	8.0	8.8	5.5	7.5	8.3	9.0
Safety and security	3	7.5	8.5	7.0	8.5	7.5	8.5
Experience from past sport events	3	9.0	10.0	9.0	10.0	8.0	9.0
Finance	3	6.7	8.6	6.9	8.5	6.9	8.3
Overall project and legacy	3	8.0	9.0	4.0	7.0	8.0	9.0

A firm criteria for the Winter Olympics is the availability of alpine ski slopes of certain sizes, which narrows down potential locations fairly much, and often means locations in less populated areas. The men's downhill requires at least 700 meters altitude difference along around 3 kilometers length.

All three bidding cities were short-listed.

== Candidate cities overview ==
All three cities suggested hosting the Games between 9–25 February 2018. The Paralympics will be held from 9–18 March.

=== Annecy ===
Annecy
- Overview

Details
- Votes: 7
- Country: France

At first, the French Olympic Committee (CNOSF) was quite reluctant in bidding for a Winter Games, preferring to focus on a bid for the 2024 Summer Olympics. However, four cities (Annecy, Grenoble, Nice and Pelvoux) expressed interest in hosting the 2018 games. On 24 September 2008, the Olympic Committee announced it had granted these wishes and would bid in 2011. Annecy was elected as the official candidate city by the French NOC on 18 March 2009. The CNOSF acknowledged its tough competition, but intended to learn from the failure of Paris to secure the Summer Olympics recently with victory in Annecy, maintaining a humble approach.

Previous bid head Edgar Grospiron, Olympic skiing champion, stated, "we have exceptional, spectacular scenery with Mount Blanc, economic strength with one million tourists every year, and so we believe that our bid is credible. We want to invite the world to a party in a world famous resort". Grospiron was being assisted by IOC members and former Olympians Jean-Claude Killy and Guy Drut. However, his demission on 12 December 2010 raised questions on the viability of the bid. On 10 January 2011, Charles Beigbeder was named as the new CEO for the Annecy bid. In addition, Olympic champions Jean-Pierre Vidal and Pernilla Wiberg were appointed as Vice Presidents of the bid. Beigbeder said he would seek more financial support for the bid from the private sector. Also announced with Beigbeder's appointment was the selection of Pierre Mirabaud as Director General of the bid. Mirabaud had been a regional government prefect, experience which Beigbeder said was needed by the bid.

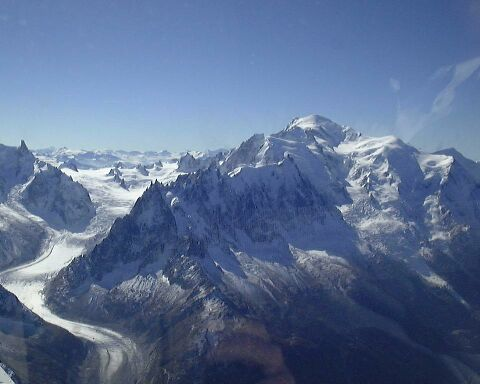
Mont Blanc, near Annecy

On 12 February 2011, the IOC evaluation commission completed its four-day inspection of the Annecy bid. During a brief press conference, commission chair Gunilla Lindberg was cautious in her praise of Annecy. On a positive note, she told reporters: "We have during our visit witnessed very strong governmental support which the bid enjoys and this was highlighted by the presence of the President Sarkozy and many members of his cabinet throughout the visit. I think the bid committee of Annecy has listened to the comments made by the IOC [criticism of the spread-out venues in June] and there has been a big improvement, especially not having so many competition venues as was proposed." But there was no glowing assessment of the Annecy bid from Lindberg. The Swedish IOC member also gave no clue about any concerns that had arisen during the inspection team's four-day stay in the French Alpine town.

French President Nicolas Sarkozy also travelled to Annecy to meet with the IOC Evaluation Commission inspecting the city's bid for the 2018 Winter Olympic Games. "The government will do everything possible, you can be sure, so that Annecy, applicant for the 2018 Winter Olympics, will be chosen," Sarkozy said. "Annecy's victory will be the victory of the entire nation, standing behind you." While pledging his support for the bid he said "you are trying hard. It's difficult. Your opponents are extremely powerful but I'm with you. If we win the Games it will be fantastic. And if we don't win, all we did will be useful for your cities and your region".

The territory that was proposed to host the Games is concentrated in Annecy and Mont Blanc where 65% of the venues were already built and "the world's leading winter sports destination". In a reference to difficult snow conditions at the 2010 Winter Olympics, organizers made a guarantee of snow in Pays de Savoie where the average snowfall in February is 80 cm. Annecy is a smaller city, so the whole department of Haute-Savoie would have been used, including world-famous ski resorts like Chamonix, Megève, La Clusaz, Morzine and Le Grand Bornand. Spread over an area with a 50 km radius, everything is within an hour of Annecy, and two Olympic villages were planned., Of the 13 venues, six venues would have required permanent upgrades, two new venues were already planned to be built, and four other venues would have been built if the Games were hosted in Annecy. Sliding events would have been at La Plagne, the same facilities that were used for the 1992 Winter Olympics in Albertville and which were upgraded in 2008.

However, in June 2010, the IOC criticized Annecy's bid stating that the competition venues were excessively dispersed. The IOC report was highly critical over the original venue plan, saying it would "present major operational and financial challenges" that would "affect the Games experience for all client groups, particularly athletes". On 4 October 2010 Annecy's leaders unveiled a new "ultra-compact" venue concept in response to the IOC concerns. Under the reworked venue plans, all ice and snow events would take place within a 21-mile radius at two main bases, Annecy and Chamonix, which are less than an hour apart and linked by motorway and the "Games Train". All alpine skiing would take place in Chamonix, which would also host ice hockey. All freestyle skiing and snowboard were centered on Annecy. Curling was relocated to Annecy, the hub of most ice sports, meaning that the Olympic Village would have been a little bigger than previously, to accommodate 2,500 athletes and officials. The revised bid moved the second Olympic Village (1,500 beds) from the Mont Blanc valley into the center of Chamonix.

On 28 March 2011, the CAO (Annecy Anti-Olympic Committee) stated that it wanted to tell people about what "not only the excesses of the Olympics, the sport business, the financial stakes of multinationals and unacceptable demands of the IOC, but also on adverse impacts on the environment and on uncontrolled public spending with long-term debt for the Olympic city". The group said it had collected 13,140 names for its petition opposing plans to bring the Winter Olympics to Annecy. In a press release issued on the 28th, the opposition group cited information reported exclusively by media outlet Around the Rings that an IOC poll showed only 51 percent of the local population supports the Annecy candidacy.

Bid costs were US$21 million. Venue construction was set for $419 million and transport/infrastructure costs (including some already planned and some dependent on the Games) was $2.1 billion. Among the transport costs were a new high-capacity gondola connection between Flaine and Mont-Blanc, and a train link. The nearest airport service would have been in Lyon and Geneva (35 minutes by car). Public support for the bid was 88% across France and 81% in the Annecy region.

Annecy's logo featured the French Alps, specifically Mont Blanc, as well as suggesting the letter "A" for Annecy.

=== Munich ===
Munich
- Overview

Details
- Votes: 25
- Country: Germany

Munich hosted the 1972 Summer Olympics, and if selected, it would have been the first city to host both the Summer and Winter Games (the title later was claimed by Beijing) and as well would be the first Olympics since 1936 Summer Olympics to have a single German nation following reunification. Berlin and Hamburg were considering a summer games bid for 2024 or 2028, but the German Olympic Committee put priority on the Munich bid. After Salzburg's failure to capture the 2014 bid, Germany felt it has a better chance and would have preferred the Olympics sooner rather than later. Munich's bid head was figure skating superstar Katarina Witt, replacing skiing star/filmmaker/entrepreneur Willy Bogner, Jr. who had to step down for health reasons.

Munich stressed an environmental approach and would have used existing venues in Munich (some from the 1972 Games), and existing venues in the Bavarian mountain resorts of Garmisch-Partenkirchen (location of the 1936 Winter Olympics) and Schönau am Königssee, an hour away by car. Fifteen competition venues were proposed – eight exist, three would have required construction and four would have been temporary. To take environmental responsibility, new venue construction would be on existing sites in order to minimize land use. Ice events would have been held in Munich in addition to the existing Olympic Stadium for ceremonies. The Olympic swimming pool would have been adapted into a curling venue, figure skating and short track would have been at Olympic hall, a hockey arena would have been on the site of the old cycling stadium, and a second ice hockey arena and a speed skating oval would have been dismantled and used elsewhere after the Games. Garmisch-Partenkirchen Snow Park would have housed nine snow venues, Both locations would have had Olympic villages. In the district of Berchtesgadener Land, located in close proximity of the border to Salzburg, Austria, the historic Koenigssee Sliding Center was renovated for the World Championships in 2011 for hosting bobsleigh, luge and skeleton.

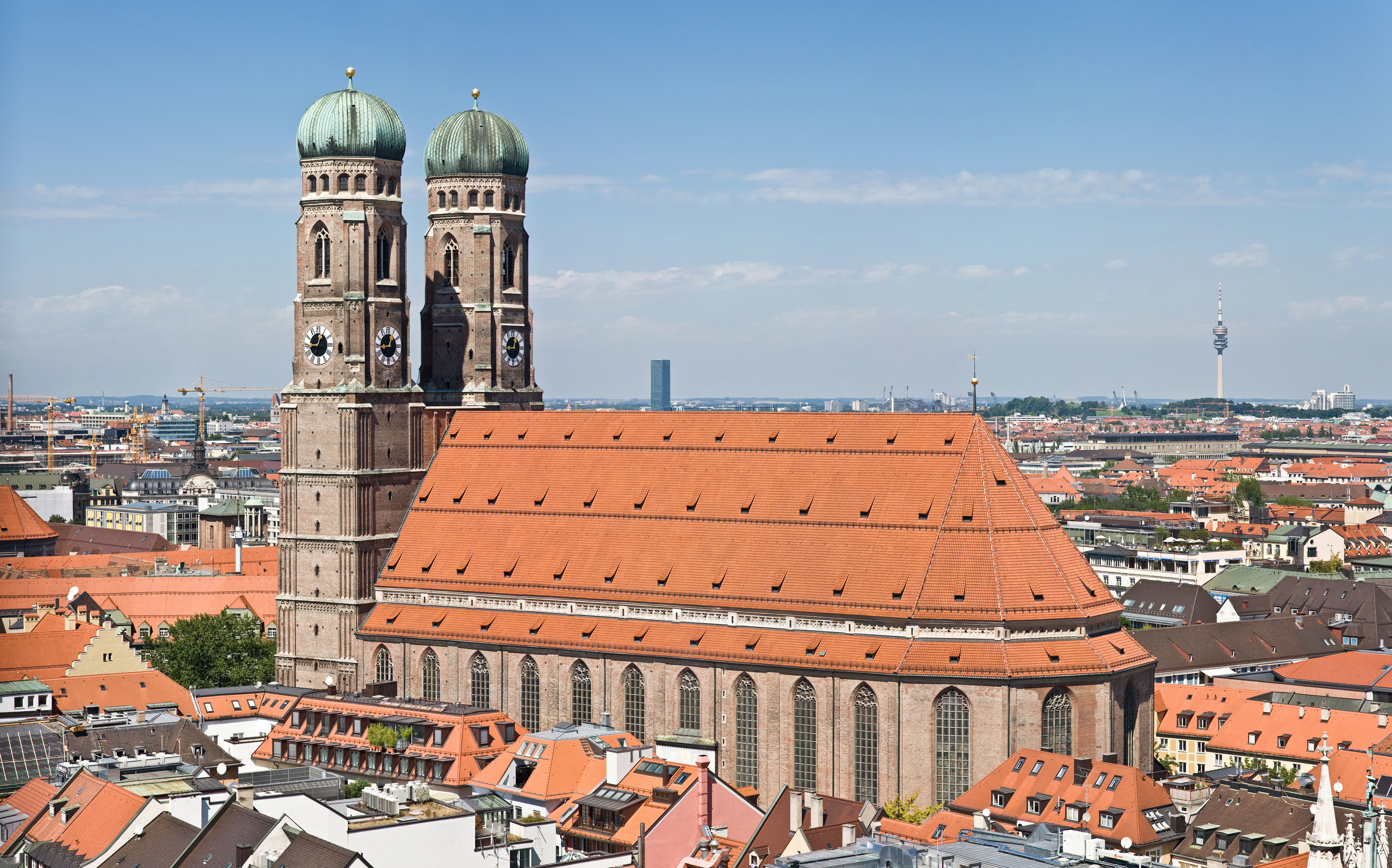
Central Munich with the Olympic park in the far background

The Green Party and several ecological associations opposed the bid. Arguments included the lack of natural snow, the environmental costs of artificial snow, using green land for temporary sites, road construction projects that would have caused a lasting increase of transit traffic, the financial risk, and the imposition of unnegotiable clauses by the IOC. As these points received increasing attention, public support for the bid diminished. While a 2009 poll gave 75.5% support of Munich residents and 68% across Germany, in spring 2010 these numbers were down to 69% and 64%, respectively. The bid proved highly divisive in Garmisch-Partenkirchen, where more than 50 farmers refused to allow the use of their grounds. Before, similar refusal of farmers to cooperate had forced the planners to abandon Oberammergau as site of the Nordic competitions. As a replacement, a state-owned stud near Ohlstadt was chosen, which is located 200 meters lower than Oberammergau and more often than not is snow free in February.

On 22 February 2011, land owners in Garmisch-Partenkirchen supporting the 'Nolympia' initiative began collecting signatures under efforts to force a vote to decide whether the town would back the bid. "The Olympic Winter Games are too big for Garmisch-Partenkirchen. With more than fifty events in the snow cluster there are almost five times as many events as the world ski championships," said Nolympia backer Axel Doering. "Our goal is to win a referendum, so that the contracts be reviewed. Another goal is to finally show that the alleged "huge majority" [of support] for the Olympic Winter Games is a myth," he added. Munich's bid plans called for the leasing of land from private land owners for the Games. The then-German Olympic committee President Thomas Bach said complaints by landowners in Garmisch-Partenkirchen were not a problem for the bid. "It's not a problem at all because for the field of play, it's one piece of land with 800 square meters. The piece of land was there for the alpine world championships six weeks before," said Bach. He added "we have seen this at the world championships they were all going down on this very slope and they will go down in 2018, hopefully."

On 28 February 2011, the IOC evaluation commission traveled to Munich and to the other cities, in which competitions would be held. The 1972 Olympic Stadium in Garmisch-Partenkirchen was the high point of the IOC's tour. IOC Evaluation Commission chair Gunilla Lindberg said her inspection team had "absolutely felt the atmosphere and passion" for the Olympics at the end of its four-day inspection of the Munich bid. The then-IOC vice-president Thomas Bach insisted that 2018 was a good time for the IOC and Olympic Movement to bring the Games to the traditional winter sports city of Munich to "recharge the batteries after having been to new regions, with 2014 to Sochi and 2016 to Rio". German chancellor Angela Merkel said Munich had a "very good chance" of winning the race to host the 2018 Winter Olympics. She added, "The world can look forward to Germany hosting the Olympic and Paralympic Winter Games 2018."

In addition to its historical strength as a winter sports nation, figure skating superstar Katarina Witt promoted the bid, as well as 2010 Winter Olympics star alpine skier Maria Riesch and Olympic champion Bavarian biathlete Magdalena Neuner. Within the IOC, Munich was allied with IOC vice president Thomas Bach. Munich nevertheless already considered a bid for 2022 before the 2018 bid failed.

Organizers budgeted US$42 million for the bid and US$331 million for venues with $143 million budgeted for an ice hockey arena. $743 million was allotted for new and planned transportation improvements.

The slogan of the Games was Die Spiele im Herzen (The games at heart) and it was also being tagged as "the friendly Games". The logo was a stylized M, reminiscent of the Bavarian mountain silhouettes as well as the awnings in Munich's Olympic Park.

Following the 2018 loss, Germany focused on the 2036 Summer Olympics bidding with the capital city of Berlin, currently in talks with Israel's Tel Aviv over possible joint bidding to mark the 100th anniversary of the 1936 Summer Olympics.

=== Pyeongchang ===
Pyeongchang
- Overview

Details
- Votes: 63
- Country: South Korea

After losing the bids for the 2010 and 2014 Winter Olympics, Gangwon Province Governor Jin-sun Kim announced in September 2007 that Pyeongchang would bid a third time. He cited increased knowledge of the bidding process and the enthusiasm of residents as reasons to keep trying. According to a survey by The Chosun Ilbo on 23 December 2009, 91.4% of Koreans, 93.4% of Pyeongchang and Jeongseon residents, and 93% of Gangwon residents supported the 2018 Winter Olympics bid. Cho Yang-ho, Chairman of Hanjin Group, was appointed as the bid committee chairman in 2009, and successfully won the bid in 2011. South Korea's figure skating superstar and 2010 Olympic champion Kim Yuna and IOC member and Samsung Group chairman Lee Kun-hee promoted the bid. The Samsung Chairman and principal owner Lee Kun-hee, given a 3-year suspended sentence for tax evasion and illegal bond dealing, was reportedly pardoned by the South Korean president Lee Myung-bak with the hope that his connections and financial support would boost the chances of Pyeongchang.

On 16 February 2011, the IOC Evaluation Commission arrived in Korea for inspection of Pyeongchang's bid. "We have seen great progress in the bid from the two previous bids," commission chairwoman Gunilla Lindberg said. "We have also seen progress in Korean winter sports during the last four years." Speaking at the IOC news conference following the inspection of Pyeongchang and venues in Gangwon Province, Lindberg said "I must also mention the passionate support of Gangwon residents. During our site visits it has been wonderful to see so many people to show their support to bring the Olympic Movement to Korea."

Seven venues had been built since the previous bids, including ski jumping slopes, and biathlon and cross-country skiing courses. Pyeongchang would be a compact Olympic Games, with travel times of less than 30 minutes between the main accommodation in Alpensia resort and the venues and 10 minutes between venues. A new 250 km per hour KTX line will be built between Seoul and Wonju via Pyeongchang putting Pyeongchang within 50 minutes of Seoul.

German reporter Dietmar Gessner from Sport Bild said that "in Asia including Korea you can create more customers. You can make lots of money for winter sports."

Pyeongchang's slogan is “New Horizons.” The bid's logo suggests the winter scenery of Pyeongchang with snow on the mountains. The curve implies a will to win and symbolizes a snowboard and slope of winter sports.

== Votes results of the 2018 Winter Olympics and Winter Paralympics ==
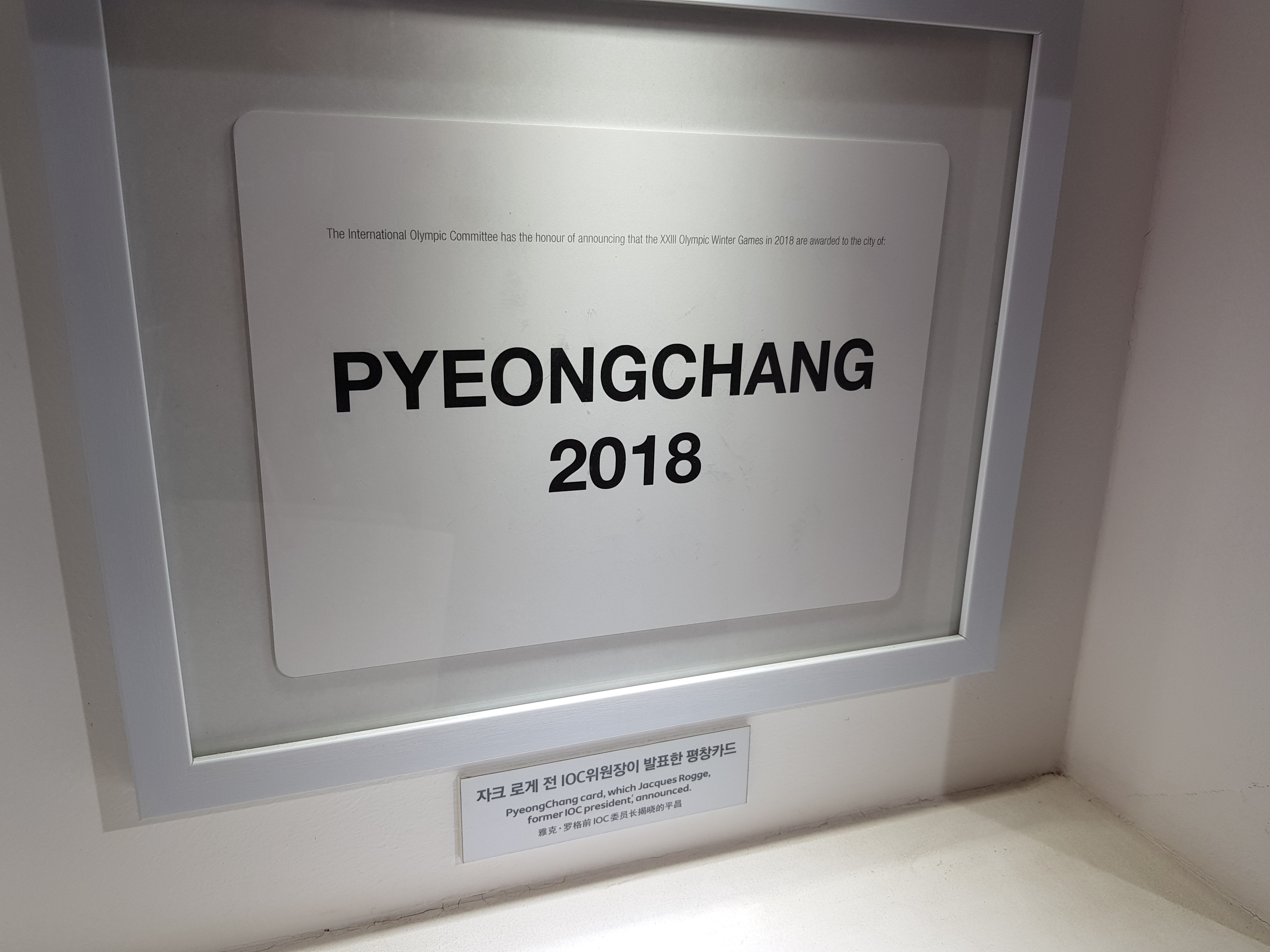
Pyeongchang Card, which Jacques Rogge, former IOC president, announced.

2018 Winter Olympics bidding results
Candidate city	NOC	Votes
Pyeongchang	South Korea	63
Munich	Germany	25
Annecy	France	7

Pyeongchang's first round victory was one of the most decisive victories in Olympic voting history. Pyeongchang's 63 vote count is the highest votes ever recorded for a first round bid for a hosting of an IOC Olympic Game. The previous record was held by Salt Lake City with 54 votes for the 2002 Winter Olympics.

== Potential cities overview ==
These cities launched bids or indicated interest, but ultimately did not bid to the IOC.

- Almaty, Kazakhstan

Almaty bid for the 2014 Winter Olympics, but did not make the short list. After the 2014 and 2018 failures, Almaty made an official bid for the 2022 Winter Olympics, but was surpassed by Beijing, China.

- Bukovel, Ukraine

The Ukrainian government announced in 2006 that Ukraine's popular Bukovel ski and snowboard resort was expanding in expectation of a bid.

- China

Li Zhanshu, governor of Heilongjiang Province, expressed interest for Harbin, host of the 2009 Winter Universiade, or possibly Changchun. Xinhua reported neither city will bid due to a number of reasons including weak infrastructure. Ultimately, the capital city of Beijing would eventually win the bid for the 2022 Winter Olympics in 2015.

- France

Gap looked at the idea of a bid, but withdrew it in September 2008. The cities of Grenoble, Nice, and Pelvoux also expressed interest to the French Olympic Committee, but were passed over for Annecy. France will host the 2024 Summer Olympics in Paris, the national capital.

- Geneva, Switzerland

Geneva planned to launch a bid pending a public referendum, but the city decided to bid in 2022 instead. The Swiss Olympic Committee did not support the bid. Switzerland eventually hosts the 2020 Winter Youth Olympics in Lausanne.

- Queenstown, New Zealand

A 2007 report indicated the New Zealand Olympic Committee suggested a bid for a combined Queenstown – Dunedin bid.

- Östersund, Sweden

The new government did not show the same enthusiasm of bidding as the previous one. The political change was already made during a bid by the Swedish Olympic Committee. It would have been the eighth attempt at bidding in the Winter Olympics, after many bids finished as runners-up.

- Sarajevo, Bosnia and Herzegovina

After losing a bid for the 2010 games, the host of the 1984 Winter Olympics expressed interest in bidding for the 2018 games.

- Sofia, Bulgaria

Vessela Lecheva, BOC chairwoman announced plans to have at least one project for a multifunctional hall in Sofia to improve chances after three failed bids. Sofia also bid for the 2016 Winter Youth Olympics but lost to Lillehammer.

- Norway

Tromsø beat Trondheim and the joint-bid Oslo–Lillehammer. The bid cost became contentious in Norway, National support was also low, with only 38% in favor of the bid; however bid head Petter Rønningen cited polls showing stronger support. Finally the application was withdrawn due to a lack of support. The cost for Tromsø games was assessed to much higher that the 15 billion NOK assumed at decision, since every arena would need to be new built or heavily rebuilt.

- Upper Carniola, Slovenia

Bohinj mayor Franc Kramar proposed a bid with seven other mayors in Upper Carniola region.

- United States

Denver (which voted not to host the 1976 Winter Games after winning hosting rights), Reno/Tahoe (host of the 1960 Games), and Salt Lake City (host of the 2002 Games) had expressed interest in hosting before the U.S. Olympic Committee declined to submit a bid. The United States will later host the 2028 Summer Olympics in Los Angeles.

- Zaragoza, Spain

There were initiatives to present Zaragoza. However, the mayor announced they would reserve the bid for the 2022 Winter Olympics, reasoning it would be unlikely for Europe to be awarded due to the unofficial continental rotation policy, giving the failure of Madrid's bid for the 2016 Summer Olympics as an example. The games were awarded to Rio de Janeiro, Brazil, became the first Latin American city to stage the largest sports event in the world.

== Predicting indices ==
Two websites, GamesBids.com and Around the Rings, feature predicting indices which specialize in evaluations of Olympic Games bids. They periodically release analysis of the candidates and assigns them a score between 0 and 100, or 0 and 110 respectively. The score produces a number that can be used to rate a bid relative to past successful bids – and possibly gauge its potential future success. GamesBids.com's scale is called BidIndex, ATR's is called the Power Index.

PowerIndex predicted that Munich would win, while BidIndex predicted that PyeongChang would win. Annecy was at a distant third, lagging behind 13 points in the BidIndex and 10 points behind in the PowerIndex. Ratings for the BidIndex are from April 2011 and rating for the PowerIndex are from June 2011.

Unofficial indices

Candidate	BidIndex^{[a]}	PowerIndex^{[b]}
(Germany) Munich	64.99	83
(South Korea) Pyeongchang	66.29	79
(France) Annecy	53.85	69
