= Astún =

Spanish ski resort

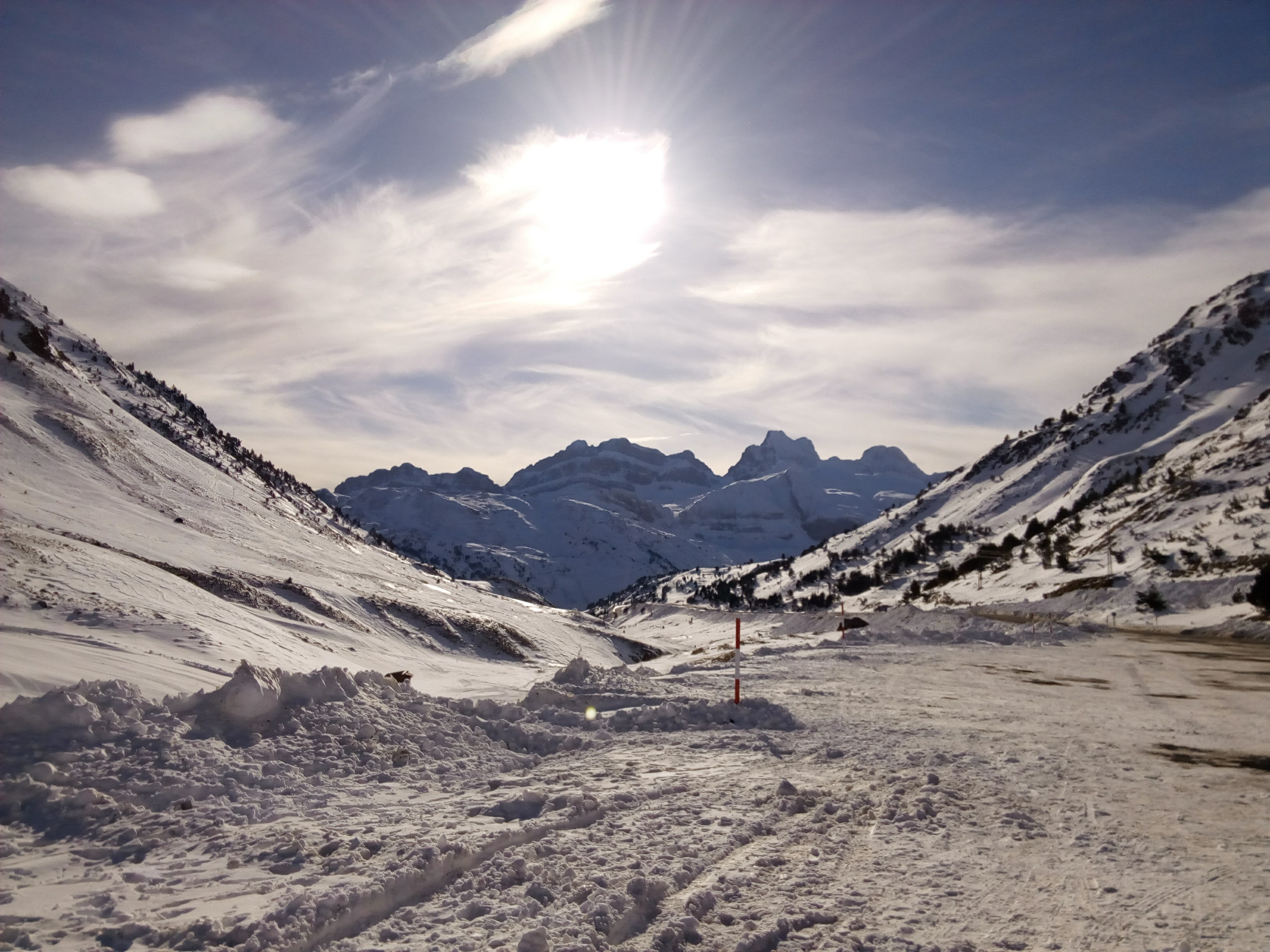
- General view of the resort town.

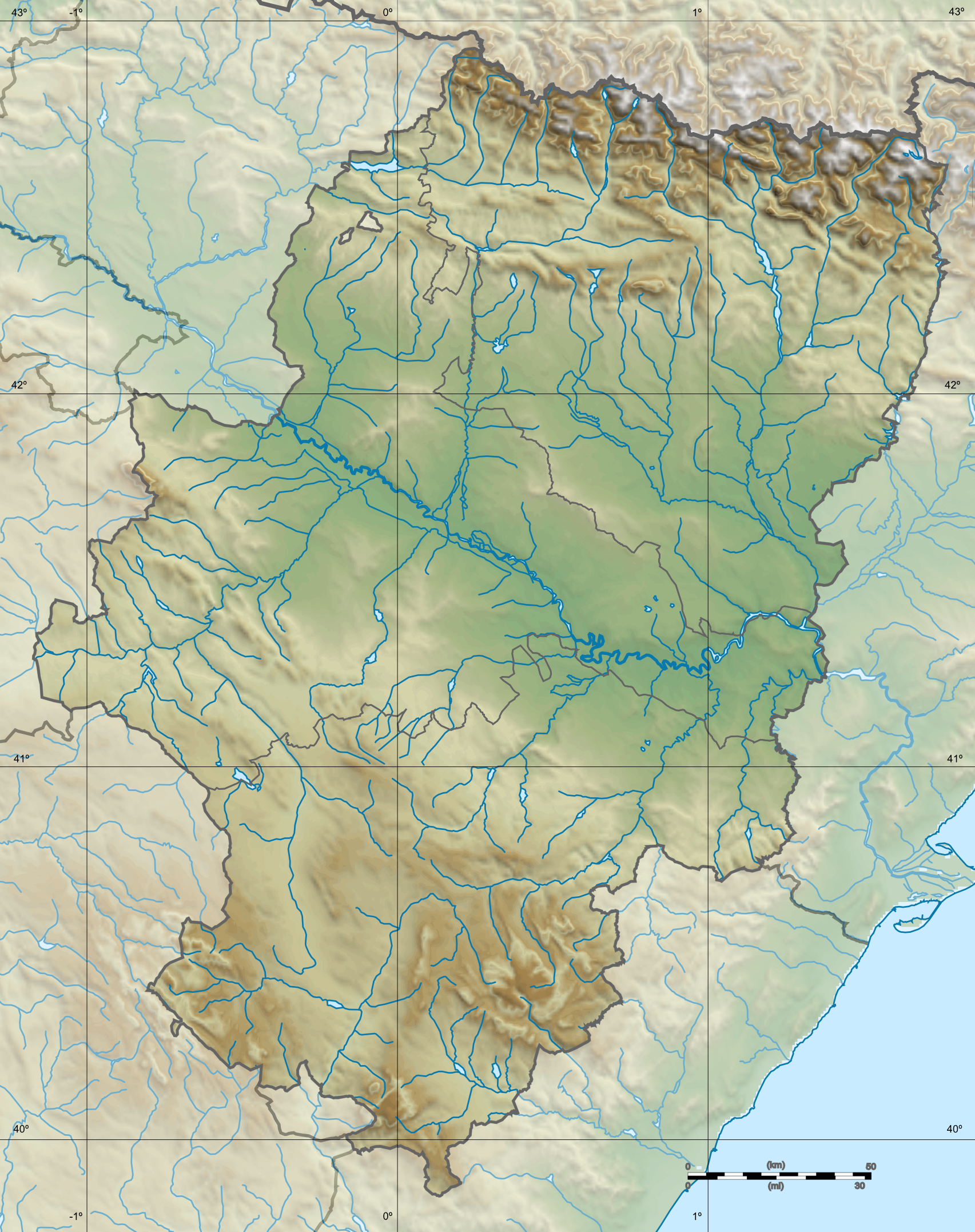
- Location within Spain Location within Aragon Location within Pyrenees
- Location: Pyrenees, Spain
- Nearest city: Jaca
- Coordinates: 42°48′35″N 0°30′22″W
- Top elevation: 2300 m
- Base elevation: 1700 m
- Skiable area: 39 km
- Trails: 48
- Lift system: 6 chair lifts. 7 ski tows.
- Website: http://www.astun.com

Astún (Spanish pronunciation: [asˈtun]) is a ski resort situated near the town of Canfranc in the High Aragon of the western Pyrenees (province of Huesca, Spain). The source of the Aragon River is in the resort. Ibón de Truchas attracts anglers. It is connected to the city by 33 km of the N -330. At its feet is the urbanization of the tracks, which had 6 inhabitants in 2012.

== The resort ==
The resort has 39 km of marked pistes, and is one of the most modern resorts of the Pyrenees. The highest point is La Raca peak, 2300m AMSL, with a vertical drop of 600m.

The base of the resort is a purpose-built town which includes several hotels and apartments and is situated at 1700m AMSL. From there the main chairlifts provide access for the resort. The resort itself occupies two different high mountain valleys, defining two sectors: La Raca - Sarrios, and Truchas. Each sector is accessed from the base of the resort using a chairlift.

Astún offers a joint ski pass with the neighbouring resort of Candanchú.

=== Lifts ===
The resort has:

- 6 chair lifts.
- 7 ski tows.

=== Pistes ===
The resort offers 48 pistes of different difficulties:

- 3 beginner.
- 14 easy.
- 22 intermediate.
- 9 expert.

=== Services ===
- 8 restaurants.
- 3 skiing schools.
- 1 snow garden for children.
- 1 kindergarten.
- 4 ski hiring stores.

=== Accidents ===
On January 18, 2025, an accident occurred when the cantilevered bullwheel at the top of the Canal Roya chairlift detached and the haul rope caught on the tower of the bullwheel while the lift was in operation. The sudden loss of tension caused severe oscillations in the haul rope, which lifted it out of the sheave assemblies at several towers. Several passengers were ejected from their seats. At least thirteen people were injured to varying degrees, one person was reported in critical condition.
