= Zapatilla (mountain) =

Mountain in Spain

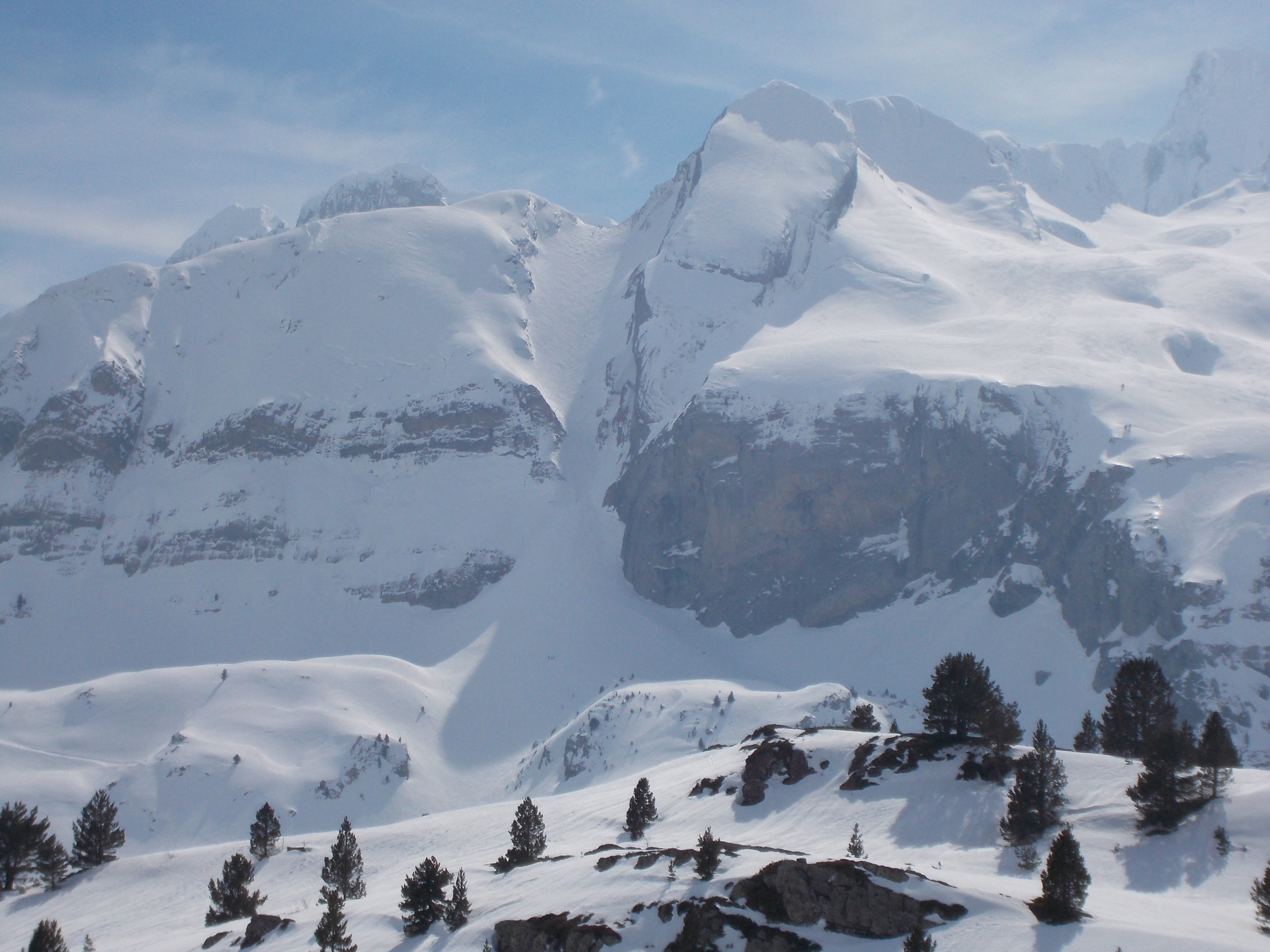
- Zapatilla, Candanchú, 15 March 2014

Highest point
- Elevation: 2,242 m (7,356 ft)
- Prominence: 14.028 m (46.02 ft)
- Coordinates: 42°46′32.30″N 0°33′08.51″W

Geography
- Location within Spain
- Country: Spain
- Parent range: Pyrenees

Zapatilla (also known as La Zapatilla) is a Spanish peak in the Pyrenees mountain range.

== Location ==
It is located on the Spanish side of the French border, near the Candanchú ski resort. It is located at a height of 2,450 m (8,040 ft). The prominence is at 14.028 m (46.02 ft). Aspe is located adjacent to Zapatilla.

The peak's La Zapatilla tube, an incline of 35º, is known for providing an extreme challenge to professional skiers and snowboarders.

== Gallery ==
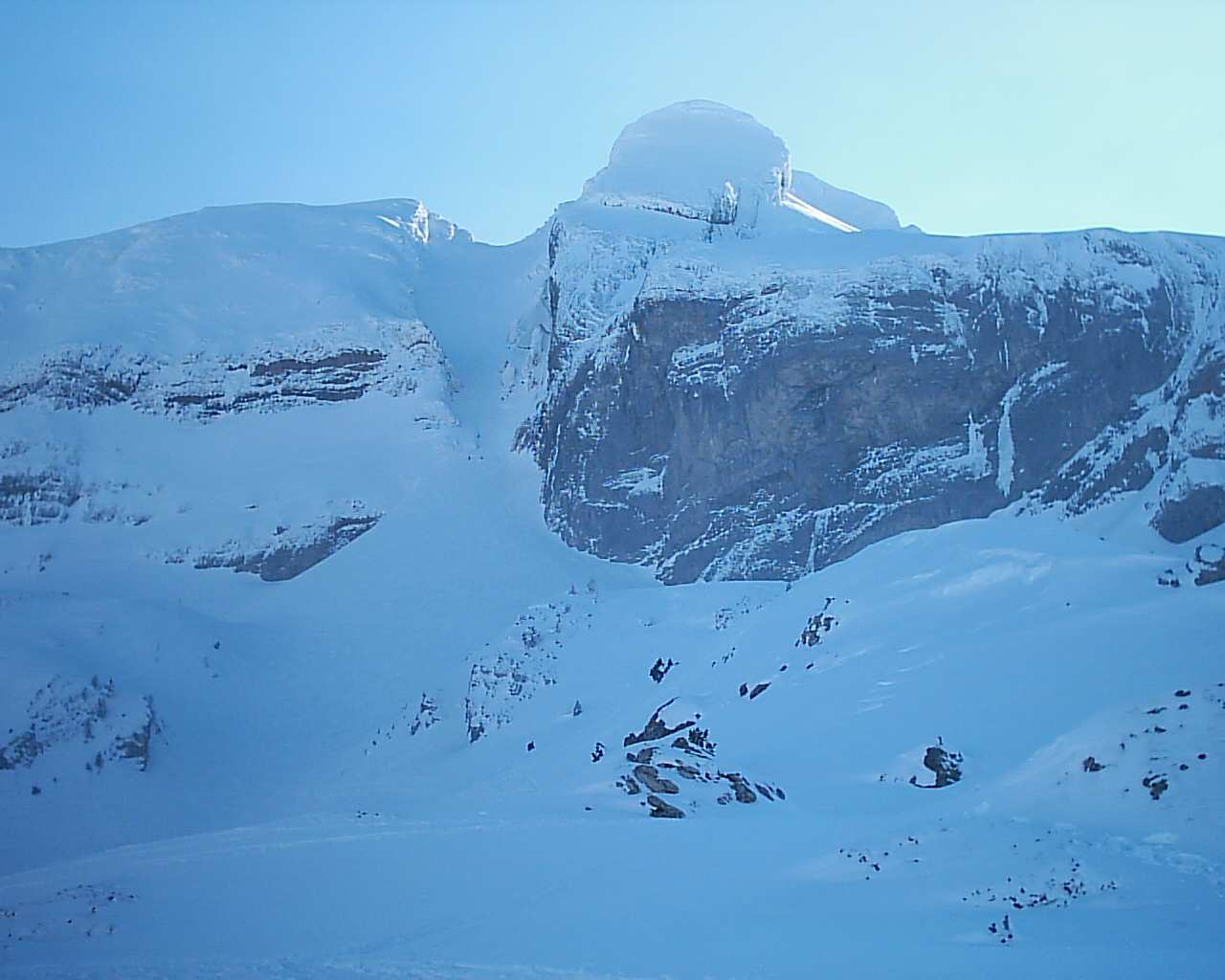
View of the Zapatilla tube, 20 December 2005

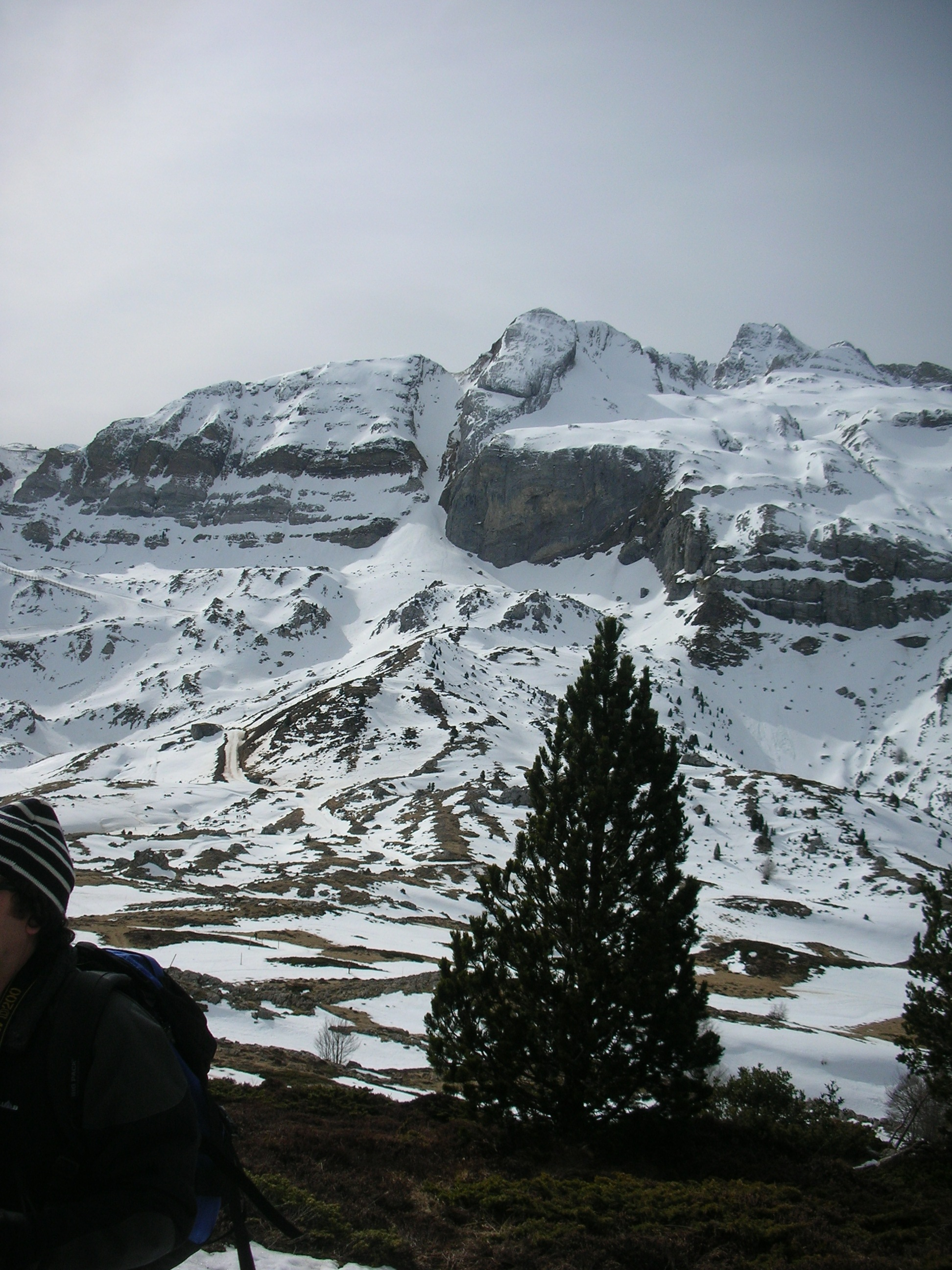
Zapatilla Tube (Candanchú), 24 February 2008
