= Salzburg bid for the 2014 Winter Olympics =

Bids for the 2014 Winter Olympics and Paralympics
Overview
- XXII Olympic Winter Games; XI Paralympic Winter Games
- Winner: Sochi; Runner-up: Pyeongchang; Shortlist: Salzburg

Details
- City: Salzburg, Austria
- NOC: Austrian Olympic Committee

Previous Games hosted
- None

Decision
- Result: Runner-up

Salzburg 2014 (Austro-Bavarian: Soizbuag 2014) was an unsuccessful bid by the Austrian Olympic Committee to host the 2014 Winter Olympics and 2014 Winter Paralympics in Salzburg, Austria. Salzburg was one of seven applicants for the games, and one of three to be short-listed, along with Sochi, Russia, and Pyeongchang, South Korea. It was the second consecutive time Salzburg bid for the Winter Olympics, after the close call with the 2010 bid, and the four consecutive time Austria bid, having bid with Graz in 2002 and Klagenfurt in 2006. The 2014 bid is more compact than the 2010 project due to the elimination of the Kitzbühel, St. Johann and Ramsau venues. One venue (Schönau am Königssee for bobsled, skeleton and luge) is located in Germany.
