= Charles Beigbeder =

French businessman

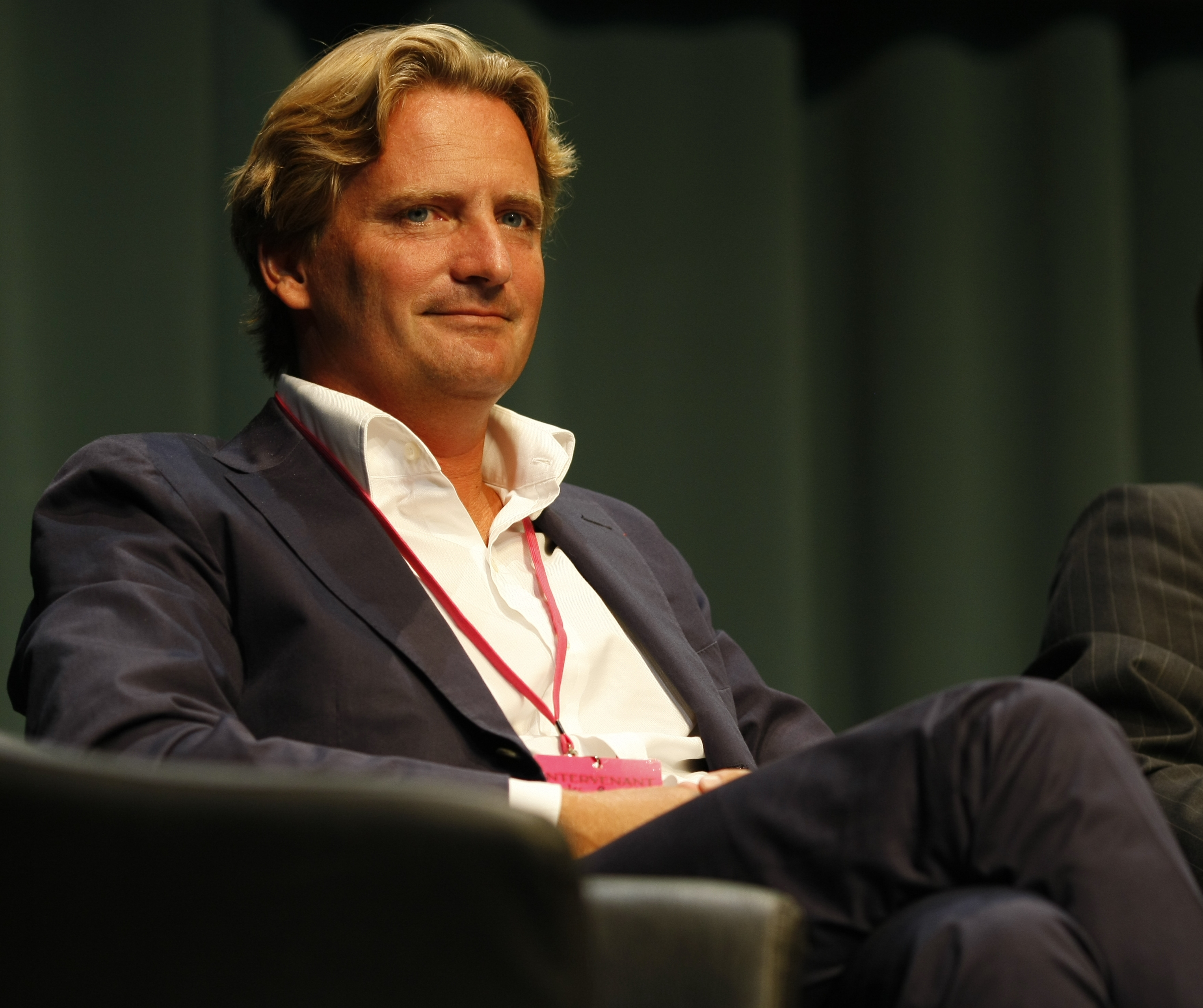
- Born: 20 April 1964 (age 62); Neuilly-sur-Seine, France
- Education: École Centrale Paris
- Occupation: Businessman
- Relatives: Frédéric Beigbeder (brother)

Charles Beigbeder is a French businessman.

== Biography ==
His brother is Frédéric Beigbeder. He graduated from the École Centrale Paris in 1988.

In 1989, he started his career at Matra Marconi Space. From 1990 to 1991, he worked as a merchant banker for Banque Paribas. From 1991 to 1994, he worked for Credit Suisse First Boston in Paris. From 1994 to 1996, he worked as a trader for MC-BBL Securities in London. He then was an investor for Angel-Invest.

In 2001, he founded Selftrade, a financial services company similar to E-Trade. In 2002, he founded Poweo, a utility company, and sold it to Verbund in 2009. In 2007, he founded Audacia, a financial firm. In 2009, he founded AgroGeneration, and bought farming land in Ukraine to invest in biofuel.

In 2017, he became chairman and CEO of Audacia which he pivoted to a multistage Private Equity firm. With Christophe Jurczak and Olivier Tonneau, he co-founded Quantonation in 2018, a venture capital fund dedicated to quantum technologies, which has notably invested in quantum computing firm Pasqal.

He is also founder of Bourrienne, a fashion company and Le Philtre, a spirit company.

He has been President of Croissance Plus, and Co-Chairman of DAB Bank. He serves on the Advisory Board of 360° Capital Partners, and on the Executive Committee of the Medef since July 2005. He was appointed by Chantal Jouanno, the French Minister of Sports, to serve as the Annecy Chairman for the Bids for the 2018 Winter Olympics. He is a Union pour un Mouvement Populaire appointee for Reforms.

== Publications ==
- NewSpace, l'économie à la conquête du Cosmos (NewSpace: The Economy Conquering the Cosmos), Eyrolles, 2026
