= Sochi bid for the 2014 Winter Olympics =

Bids for the 2014 Winter Olympics and Paralympics
Overview
- XXII Olympic Winter Games; XI Paralympic Winter Games
- Winner: Sochi; Runner-up: Pyeongchang; Shortlist: Salzburg

Details
- City: Sochi, Russia
- NOC: Russian Olympic Committee

Previous Games hosted
- None

Decision
- Result: Winner (51 votes)

Sochi 2014 was a successful bid by the Russian Olympic Committee to host the 2014 Winter Olympics and 2014 Winter Paralympics in Sochi, Russia. Sochi was one of seven applicants for the games, and one of three to be short-listed, along with Pyeongchang, South Korea, and Salzburg, Austria. Sochi is a resort city located on the Black Sea. The bid involved the city itself hosting ice events, while ski events were to be held at the ski resort in Krasnaya Polyana. The bid's advantages include ample hotel rooms and strong public and political support. Sochi also bid for the 2002 Winter Olympics, but failed to make the short-list.
