= Sport Bild =

- Logo
- Categories: Sports magazine
- Frequency: Weekly
- Circulation: 421,200 (2012)
- Founded: 1988; 38 years ago
- Company: Axel Springer AG
- Country: Germany
- Based in: Hamburg
- Language: German
- Website: sportbild.de

Sport Bild is a German weekly sports magazine published in Hamburg, Germany.

== History and profile ==
Sport Bild was established in 1988. It is published weekly every Wednesday. The magazine has its headquarters in Hamburg and is published by Axel Springer AG. The magazine covers news about all types of sport, but its major focus is on football.

In 2001 Sport Bild had a circulation of 512,000 copies. The circulation of the magazine was 437,516 copies in 2010. Its average circulation was 421,200 copies in 2012 in Germany.

In May 2007, the magazine was published for the first time with an accompanying DVD, on which 90 minutes of highlights from the previous Bundesliga soccer season were shown.

== See also ==
- List of magazines in Germany
