= Candanchú =

Ski resort in Spain

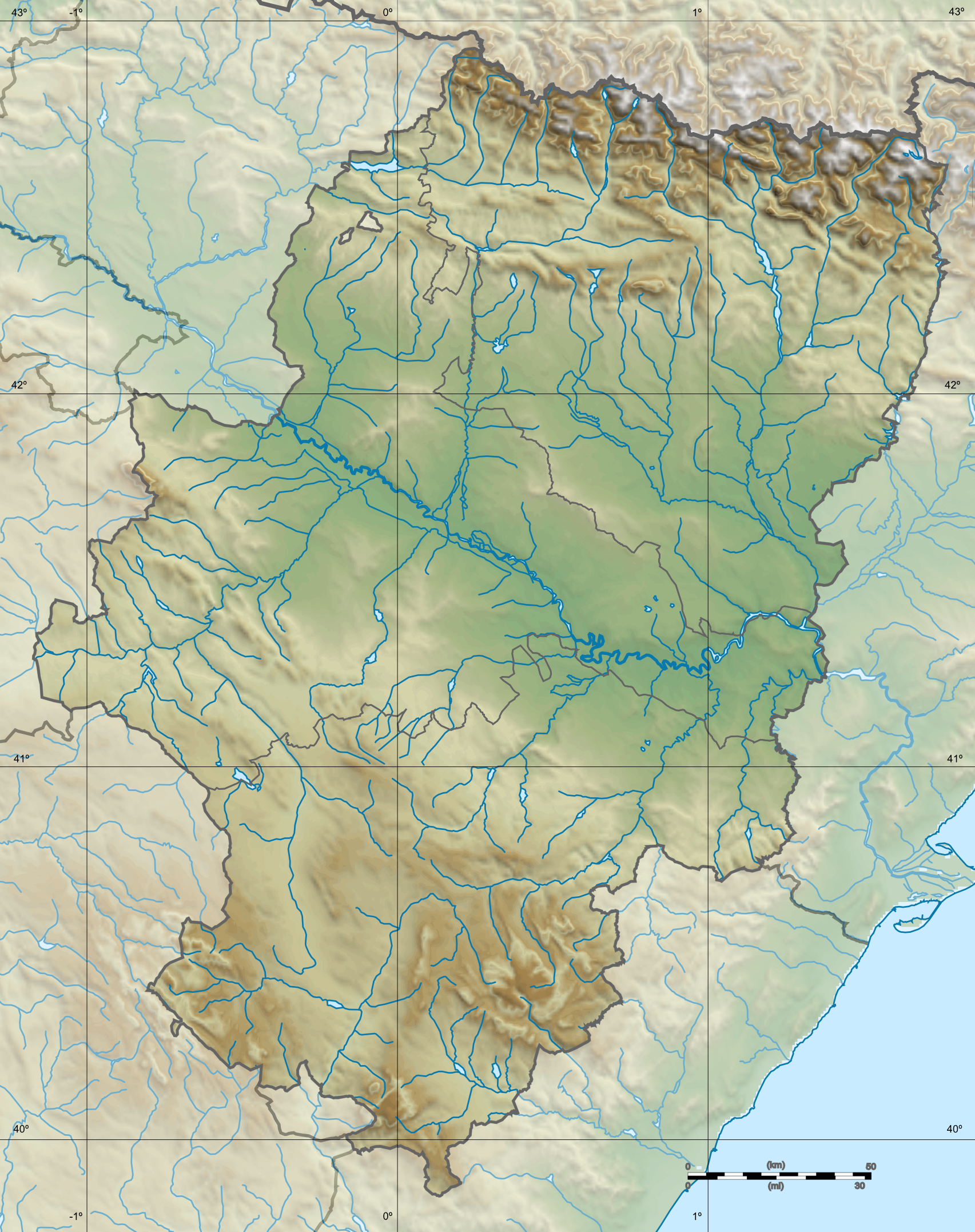
- Location within Spain Location within Aragon Location within Pyrenees
- Location: Pyrenees, Spain
- Nearest city: Jaca
- Coordinates: 42°47′17″N 0°31′40″W
- Top elevation: 2,400 m (7,900 ft)
- Base elevation: 1,500 m (4,900 ft)
- Skiable area: 59 km
- Trails: 51
- Lift system: 6 chairlifts, 18 ski tows
- Website: http://www.candanchu.com

Candanchú is a ski resort situated near the town of Canfranc in the High Aragon of the western Pyrenees, in the province of Huesca, Spain. The name of the area is an adaptation of the French "Camp d'Anjou", as it was originally the site of a military camp of the French Angevin dynasty. This is also located near the road on the historical Camino de Santiago. Candanchú is 1 km from Puerto del Somport, on the border with France. The neighboring Astún ski resort is located 27 km north of the city of Jaca. On the right bank of the river Aragón, near the bridge of Santa Cristina, are the ruins of the Hospital of Santa Cristina of Somport, a hospice for pilgrims on the Camino de Santiago.

== The resort ==
Candanchú was one of the first developed ski resorts in the Pyrenees. With 59 km of marked pistes, it is known for its very difficult, steep pistes such as Tubo Zapatilla. The highest point is La Tuca peak, 2400 metres AMSL, with a vertical drop of 900 metres.

The base of the resort is a purpose-built town which includes several hotels and apartments and is situated at 1500 metres AMSL. From there the main chairlifts provide access to the resort. The resort itself occupies two different high mountain valleys, defining two sectors: Pista Grande - El Tobazo and La Tuca. The first one is the lower sector where the main town and the parking are situated, while the upper La Tuca valley is accessed from there using a chairlift.

Candanchú offers a joint ski pass with the neighbouring resort of Astún.

=== Lifts ===
Almost all of the resort's lifts are modern and of high capacity. The resort has six chairlifts and 18 ski tows.

=== Pistes ===
The resort offers 51 pistes of different difficulties:

- 10 beginner
- 11 easy
- 18 intermediate
- 12 expert

In addition there is a 35-km cross-country ski circuit shared with the adjacent Somport resort, in France.

=== Services ===
- 6 restaurants
- 1 skiing school, Spain's oldest
- 1 snow garden for children
- 1 kindergarten
- 5 ski hiring stores
