= Bids for the 2010 Winter Olympics =

Bids for the 2010 Winter Olympics and Paralympics
Overview
- XXI Olympic Winter Games; X Paralympic Winter Games
- Winner: Vancouver; Runner-up: Pyeongchang; Shortlist: Salzburg · Bern

Details
- Committee: IOC
- Election venue: Prague; 115th IOC Session

Map of the bidding cities

Important dates
- First Bid: February 4, 2002
- Second bid: May 31, 2002
- Shortlist: August 28, 2002
- Decision: July 2, 2003

Decision
- Winner: Vancouver (56 votes)
- Runner-up: Pyeongchang (53 votes)

Three cities made the shortlist with their bids to host the 2010 Winter Olympics and Paralympics (also known as XXI Olympic Winter Games and the X Paralympic Winter Games), which were awarded to Vancouver, British Columbia, Canada, on July 2, 2003. The other shortlisted cities were Pyeongchang and Salzburg. Although Bern was originally shortlisted along with Vancouver, Pyeongchang and Salzburg, a referendum held in September 2002 revealed that a majority of the citizens of Bern did not support pursuing the candidacy. There were four other cities vying for the hosting honour, that had been dropped by the International Olympic Committee: Andorra la Vella, Harbin, Jaca and Sarajevo.

Vancouver won the bidding process to host the Olympics by a vote of the International Olympic Committee on July 2, 2003 at the 115th IOC Session held in Prague, Czech Republic. Earlier in February, Vancouver's residents voted in a referendum accepting the responsibilities of the host city should it win its bid. Sixty-four percent of residents voted in favour of hosting the games. In neighboring Washington state to the south, both the state legislature and Governor Gary Locke passed a resolution in support of Vancouver's bid, and sent it to the IOC.

== Bidding process ==
Eight cities applied to host the games. Those cities were (in the order of drawing the lots):

- Vancouver, British Columbia, Canada
- Sarajevo, Bosnia and Herzegovina
- Jaca, Spain
- Salzburg, Austria
- Pyeongchang, South Korea
- Harbin, People's Republic of China
- Bern, Switzerland
- Andorra la Vella, Andorra

Each city was required to answer a twenty-two question questionnaire.

=== Evaluation ===
The IOC Candidature Acceptance Working Group, which evaluated the applications divided their recommendations into eleven areas.

Each cell of the table provides a minimum and a maximum figure obtained by the applicant city on the specific criteria. These figures are to be compared to a benchmark which has been set at 6.

Table of scores given by the IOC Working Group to assess the quality and feasibility of the 2010 Applicant cities
Criteria	Weight	Vancouver		Sarajevo		Jaca		Salzburg		Pyeongchang		Harbin		Bern		Andorra la Vella	
Criteria	Weight	CAN		BIH		ESP		AUT		KOR		CHN		SUI		AND	
Criteria	Weight	Min	Max	Min	Max	Min	Max	Min	Max	Min	Max	Min	Max	Min	Max	Min	Max
Governmental support, legal issues, public opinion	2	6.0	8.1	3.4	6.5	6.2	8.6	6.2	7.8	5.6	8.0	7.9	8.9	4.3	6.7	3.6	6.0
General infrastructure	5	5.5	7.0	1.9	3.8	4.3	6.0	7.1	8.1	5.3	7.1	4.4	6.2	6.4	7.7	3.9	5.2
Sport venues	4	7.6	8.5	4.5	6.0	5.1	6.6	7.1	9.0	5.0	7.2	4.4	6.0	4.9	7.4	2.0	4.9
Olympic Village(s)	3	8.0	9.3	4.2	5.4	4.8	7.2	4.5	7.5	4.5	6.7	5.7	8.1	3.0	6.0	3.5	5.6
Environmental conditions and impact	2	6.7	8.5	4.8	6.7	5.5	7.5	7.8	9.0	5.5	7.5	4.0	6.3	7.5	9.0	5.2	7.5
Accommodation	5	7.0	8.5	2.0	3.0	3.5	4.5	9.0	10.0	5.5	6.5	5.0	6.0	6.5	8.0	4.0	5.0
Transport concept	3	6.9	8.1	4.6	6.4	4.9	6.8	7.2	8.4	6.1	7.8	4.8	6.9	6.4	7.8	4.5	6.4
Safety and security	3	6.8	7.8	4.0	6.0	6.0	7.6	6.2	7.2	5.4	7.2	6.2	7.6	6.0	7.0	5.0	6.4
Experience from past sport events	3	7.0	8.3	3.0	6.0	4.7	7.3	7.0	9.0	4.7	7.3	4.0	6.3	7.0	8.3	2.0	5.0
Finance	3	6.4	7.6	3.4	4.0	6.1	6.7	6.8	8.0	5.1	6.0	5.1	6.0	6.5	8.0	4.6	5.2
Overall project and legacy	3	7.0	9.0	3.0	5.0	5.0	6.5	7.0	8.0	6.0	7.5	5.0	6.0	4.5	6.5	3.0	4.0

Four cities were named Candidate Cities: Bern, Pyeongchang (which both met the benchmark), Salzburg, and Vancouver (which both exceeded it). They made additional comments with respect to Bern and Pyeongchang. As for Bern, they felt the bid had significant organizational difficulties and the financial plan's feasibility was dependent on a popular referendum. As for Pyeongchang, the resort area of Yongpyong required further development.

In September, a referendum ended Bern's chances of winning.

Each candidate city was required to answer a 199-question questionnaire. After the withdrawal of Bern, the IOC Evaluation Commission visited the three remaining cities on the following dates:

- (South Korea) Pyeongchang: February 14–17, 2003
- (Canada) Vancouver: March 2–5, 2003
- (Austria) Salzburg: March 13–16, 2003

=== Election ===
There were two rounds of voting at the convention that decided which city would host the games. In the first round Pyeongchang received 51 votes, while Vancouver received 40 and Salzburg with only 16 votes, thus eliminating them in the first round. In the second and final round of voting, Vancouver received 56 votes to Pyeongchang's 53, which proved to be the difference in margin of victory and the closest vote for an Olympic city host since Sydney, Australia beat Beijing, China by 2 votes for the 2000 Summer Olympics.

2010 Host City Election — ballot bidding results
City	Country (NOC)	Round 1	Round 2
Vancouver	Canada	40	56
Pyeongchang	South Korea	51	53
Salzburg	Austria	16	—

Across Canada, and especially in the province of British Columbia, celebrations broke out amidst the announcement made by IOC President Jacques Rogge, as evidenced on the CBC, by the network's chief correspondent, Peter Mansbridge. While Vancouver and the rest of British Columbia celebrated, the mood was bittersweet in Toronto which had aspirations to host the 2012 Summer Olympics which were awarded to London. Canada's largest city has already lost bids to host the 1996 and 2008 Summer Olympics to Atlanta and Beijing. The announcement came the day after Canada celebrated its 136th anniversary, with Canada Day. With ice hockey being their pastime, some of the people at GM Place said that winning an Olympic Games is far greater than winning a Stanley Cup when they heard the announcement. Wayne Gretzky made this evident in Prague, as he served as an ambassador and contributor to the games and was part of the presentation team.

== Bidding cities ==
=== Candidate cities ===
Logo	City	Country	National Olympic Committee	Result
Logo of Vancouver's campaign.	Vancouver	Canada	Canadian Olympic Committee (COC)	Winner
Logo of Vancouver's campaign.	In Canada, three cities expressed interest in bidding for the Games. Along with Vancouver, the eventual winner of the bid for the 2010 Games, the Canadian Olympic Association considered bids from Calgary, Alberta (host of the 1988 Winter Olympics) and Quebec City, Quebec (a candidate for the 2002 Winter Olympics). Vancouver was chosen to represent Canada. Previously, Calgary had beat Vancouver for the Canadian bid in 1988. Vancouver's bid evaluation was very positive, with only minor issues. The Bid Committee's plan to make the games environmentally sustainable and to incorporate the First Nations people was greatly applauded. The budget plan was deemed quite achievable. The venues constructed specifically for the games needed minor improvements. The plan for the Paralympics was stated to be "very compact". There was concern about traffic noise at the Vancouver Olympic Village, but the Bid Committee satisfied the Commission with assurances that the buildings would have major sound insulation. Security and accommodation plans were considered to be excellent. Minor improvement was needed in the transportation area.			
Logo of Pyeongchang's campaign.	Pyeongchang	South Korea	Korean Olympic Committee (KOC)	First runner-up
Logo of Pyeongchang's campaign.	In evaluating Pyeongchang's bid, the Commission found several issues. They were concerned that environmental issues at the alpine skiing, downhill skiing, and ski jumping venues had not properly been met. However, they did comment that local opinion in this area was positive. During their evaluation, the commission also discovered that the OCOG had increased their budget by US$150 million. A further US$3.4 billion was budgeted by other organizations, primarily for road and rail improvements. These improvements were deemed inadequate by the Commission. The budget was also seen as being underestimated. The slalom course, the Peace Valley venues, and the downhill and Super G venue was deemed inadequate at the time of evaluation. The budget for many venues was found to be either inadequate or overly high. The Commission noted that Korea had little experience in organizing winter sporting events for the disabled, and much work would need to be done in order to host the Paralympics. The three proposed Olympic villages were deemed acceptable. The security plans were also deemed acceptable. The Commission stated that the current accommodations in Pyeongchang were woefully inadequate. There was low capacity and multiple differing standards. They also found that accommodations for many sponsors were up to fifty kilometers from the venues. The transportation plan was deemed to be capable of supporting the Games. Korean broadcasters were found to need international training and experience. Pyeongchang was later chosen as the host city of the 2018 Winter Olympics and the Gangwon province was chosen to host the 2024 Winter Youth Olympics.			
Logo of Salzburg's campaign.	Salzburg	Austria	Austrian Olympic Committee (ÖOC)	Second runner-up
Logo of Salzburg's campaign.	The evaluation of Salzburg's bid was generally positive, however there were some issues. Concern was noted that the OCOG might not able to meet their proposed budget of US$901.4 million. Cost formulas were also needed for sponsor accommodations. Transportation between venues was deemed excellent. However, the snowboarding venue would have to be changed, and there were logistical issues at the Nordic combined and ski jumping venue. The Bid Committee was found to not have adequately planned for the Paralympics. The three proposed Olympic Villages were deemed excellent. Security plans were stated to be well-thought out. There was concern that accommodations might be too expensive for guests. The transportation plan was found to be in need of further development.			

=== Proposed dates and bid slogans ===
	XXI Olympic Winter Games	X Paralympic Winter Games	Slogan
Vancouver	5-21 February	5-14 March	"The sky to the sea Games"
Pyeongchang	6-21 February	6-15 March	"Happy 700"
Salzburg	5-21 February	4 - 13 March	"The sound of winter sports"

== Notes ==
- Whistler, British Columbia, the main games sub-site, was previously asked to host the 1976 Winter Olympics after Denver, Colorado, declined to host the Games due to cost concerns. The 1976 Games were eventually passed on to Innsbruck, Austria.

== See also ==
- Smiggin Holes 2010 Winter Olympic bid
