= List of bids for the Winter Olympics =

The Winter Olympics are a multi-sport event in winter sports organized by the International Olympic Committee (IOC) every four years. Selection of the host city is done at an IOC Session four to seven years prior to the tournament, in which the IOC members vote between candidate cities which have submitted bids. As of the selection of the 2018 Olympics, 23 games have been held in 20 cities in 11 countries. Bids have been made by 56 cities in 23 countries.

The bid process consists of two rounds. First, cities and national Olympic committees (NOCs) may show their interest and submit a preliminary bid, becoming applicant cities. Through analysis of the questionnaires, the IOC gave a weighted-average score to each city based on the scores obtained in each of the questionnaire's eleven themes: political and social support, general infrastructure, sports venues, Olympic Village, environment, accommodation, transport, security, past experience, finance, and legacy. IOC's Executive Committee then selects a short-list of candidate cities. The candidate cities are investigated by the IOC Evaluation Committee, who make an evaluation report. These submit a more extensive bid book and are subject to additional evaluation, which is presented to the IOC members. Voting occurs as an exhaustive ballot, which may occur through multiple rounds until a single city holds a majority of the votes. IOC members from a candidate NOC may not vote in any round while their country remains in the election.

The first games were not subject to bids and awarded to Chamonix as part of Paris' bid for the 1924 Summer Olympics. Originally the host country of the Summer Olympics had the right to host the Winter Olympics as well, if they could provide a suitable host. The 1940 Olympics were originally awarded to Sapporo, but it and the 1944 Winter Olympics were ultimately canceled due to the Second World War. The 1976 Olympics were awarded to Denver, but in a 1972 referendum, voters rejected the games, and for the only time a city awarded the Games rejected them. IOC then offered them to Whistler, but a change of government meant they were no longer interested. Salt Lake City offered to host the games, but IOC finally chose Innsbruck instead. From 1994, Winter Olympics were held between Summer Olympic years. Starting with the 2004 Olympics, only the highest-rated cities are short-listed for the final IOC vote.

Innsbruck, Lake Placid, and St. Moritz are the only cities to have hosted two games. Albertville, Grenoble, Nagano and Turin have never lost a bid. With six, Lake Placid has the most bids, followed by Cortina d'Ampezzo with five. Montreal and Jaca have both made four bids without any being successful. Helsinki, Minneapolis, Montreal and Munich have bid for both Summer and Winter Olympics; all but Minneapolis have succeeded at winning Summer bids, but none have held Winter Olympics. Canada and the United States have bid thirteen and twelve times respectively, with the US being awarded four and Canada two games. Other countries to host multiple games are France (3), Austria (2), Italy (2), Japan (2), Norway (2), and Switzerland (2). Sweden and Finland have bid eight and five times respectively, all unsuccessfully.

== By year ==
The following is a list of bids for the Winter Olympics, sorted by year. It consists of the year the games were held or scheduled to be held, the date the decision was made, the city and country which issued the bid, the votes at the IOC Session for each voting round, and the ultimate host of the games. The bid listed first for each games is the one selected by the IOC, whether or not it ultimately hosted the games.

Year	Session	Bid(s)		Vote						Host
Year	Session	City	Country	Round 1	Round 2	Round 3	Round 4	Round 5	Round 6	Host
1924	—	—	—	—	—	—	—	—	—	(France) Chamonix
1928	—	St. Moritz	Switzerland	—	—	—	—	—	—	(Switzerland) St. Moritz
1928	—	Davos	Switzerland	—	—	—	—	—	—	(Switzerland) St. Moritz
1928	—	Engelberg	Switzerland	—	—	—	—	—	—	(Switzerland) St. Moritz
1932	4 October 1929	Lake Placid	United States	—	—	—	—	—	—	(United States) Lake Placid
1932	4 October 1929	Bear Mountain	United States	—	—	—	—	—	—	(United States) Lake Placid
1932	4 October 1929	Denver	United States	—	—	—	—	—	—	(United States) Lake Placid
1932	4 October 1929	Duluth	United States	—	—	—	—	—	—	(United States) Lake Placid
1932	4 October 1929	Lake Tahoe	United States	—	—	—	—	—	—	(United States) Lake Placid
1932	4 October 1929	Minneapolis	United States	—	—	—	—	—	—	(United States) Lake Placid
1932	4 October 1929	Montreal	Canada	—	—	—	—	—	—	(United States) Lake Placid
1932	4 October 1929	Oslo	Norway	—	—	—	—	—	—	(United States) Lake Placid
1932	4 October 1929	Yosemite Valley	United States	—	—	—	—	—	—	(United States) Lake Placid
1936	—	Garmisch-Partenkirchen	Germany	—	—	—	—	—	—	(Germany) Garmisch-Partenkirchen
1936	—	Montreal	Canada	—	—	—	—	—	—	(Germany) Garmisch-Partenkirchen
1936	—	St. Moritz	Switzerland	—	—	—	—	—	—	(Germany) Garmisch-Partenkirchen
1940	31 August 1936	Sapporo	Japan	—	—	—	—	—	—	(Japan) Cancelled
1944	—	Cortina d'Ampezzo	Italy	16	—	—	—	—	—	(Italy) Cortina d'Ampezzo (cancelled)
1944	—	Montreal	Canada	12	—	—	—	—	—	(Italy) Cortina d'Ampezzo (cancelled)
1944	—	Oslo	Norway	2	—	—	—	—	—	(Italy) Cortina d'Ampezzo (cancelled)
1948	—	St. Moritz	Switzerland	—	—	—	—	—	—	(Switzerland) St. Mortiz
1948	—	Lake Placid	United States	—	—	—	—	—	—	(Switzerland) St. Mortiz
1952	21 June 1947	Oslo	Norway	16	—	—	—	—	—	(Norway) Oslo
1952	21 June 1947	Cortina d'Ampezzo	Italy	9	—	—	—	—	—	(Norway) Oslo
1952	21 June 1947	Lake Placid	United States	2	—	—	—	—	—	(Norway) Oslo
1956	28 April 1949	Cortina d'Ampezzo	Italy	31	—	—	—	—	—	(Italy) Cortina d'Ampezzo
1956	28 April 1949	Montreal	Canada	7	—	—	—	—	—	(Italy) Cortina d'Ampezzo
1956	28 April 1949	Colorado Springs	United States	2	—	—	—	—	—	(Italy) Cortina d'Ampezzo
1956	28 April 1949	Lake Placid	United States	1	—	—	—	—	—	(Italy) Cortina d'Ampezzo
1960	16 June 1955	Squaw Valley	United States	30	32	—	—	—	—	(United States) Squaw Valley
1960	16 June 1955	Innsbruck	Austria	24	30	—	—	—	—	(United States) Squaw Valley
1960	16 June 1955	Garmisch-Partenkirchen	Germany	3	—	—	—	—	—	(United States) Squaw Valley
1960	16 June 1955	St. Moritz	Switzerland	3	—	—	—	—	—	(United States) Squaw Valley
1964	26 May 1959	Innsbruck	Austria	49	—	—	—	—	—	(Austria) Innsbruck
1964	26 May 1959	Calgary	Canada	9	—	—	—	—	—	(Austria) Innsbruck
1964	26 May 1959	Lahti	Finland	0	—	—	—	—	—	(Austria) Innsbruck
1968	28 January 1964	Grenoble	France	15	18	27	—	—	—	(France) Grenoble
1968	28 January 1964	Calgary	Canada	12	19	24	—	—	—	(France) Grenoble
1968	28 January 1964	Lahti	Finland	11	14	—	—	—	—	(France) Grenoble
1968	28 January 1964	Sapporo	Japan	6	—	—	—	—	—	(France) Grenoble
1968	28 January 1964	Oslo	Norway	4	—	—	—	—	—	(France) Grenoble
1968	28 January 1964	Lake Placid	United States	3	—	—	—	—	—	(France) Grenoble
1972	25 April 1966	Sapporo	Japan	32	—	—	—	—	—	(Japan) Sapporo
1972	25 April 1966	Banff	Canada	16	—	—	—	—	—	(Japan) Sapporo
1972	25 April 1966	Lahti	Finland	7	—	—	—	—	—	(Japan) Sapporo
1972	25 April 1966	Salt Lake City	United States	7	—	—	—	—	—	(Japan) Sapporo
1976	12 May 1970	Denver	United States	29	29	39	—	—	—	(Austria) Innsbruck
1976	12 May 1970	Sion	Switzerland	18	31	30	—	—	—	(Austria) Innsbruck
1976	12 May 1970	Tampere	Finland	12	8	—	—	—	—	(Austria) Innsbruck
1976	12 May 1970	Vancouver	Canada	9	—	—	—	—	—	(Austria) Innsbruck
1980	13 October 1974	Lake Placid	United States	—	—	—	—	—	—	(United States) Lake Placid
1984	18 May 1978	Sarajevo	Yugoslavia	31	39	—	—	—	—	(Socialist Federal Republic of Yugoslavia) Sarajevo
1984	18 May 1978	Sapporo	Japan	33	36	—	—	—	—	(Socialist Federal Republic of Yugoslavia) Sarajevo
1984	18 May 1978	Gothenburg	Sweden	10	—	—	—	—	—	(Socialist Federal Republic of Yugoslavia) Sarajevo
1988	30 September 1981	Calgary	Canada	35	48	—	—	—	—	(Canada) Calgary
1988	30 September 1981	Falun	Sweden	25	31	—	—	—	—	(Canada) Calgary
1988	30 September 1981	Cortina d'Ampezzo	Italy	18	—	—	—	—	—	(Canada) Calgary
1992	16 October 1986	Albertville	France	19	26	29	42	—	51	(France) Albertville
1992	16 October 1986	Sofia	Bulgaria	25	25	28	24	—	25	(France) Albertville
1992	16 October 1986	Falun	Sweden	10	11	11	11	41	9	(France) Albertville
1992	16 October 1986	Lillehammer	Norway	10	11	9	11	40	—	(France) Albertville
1992	16 October 1986	Cortina d'Ampezzo	Italy	7	6	7	—	—	—	(France) Albertville
1992	16 October 1986	Anchorage	United States	7	5	—	—	—	—	(France) Albertville
1992	16 October 1986	Berchtesgaden	Germany	6	—	—	—	—	—	(France) Albertville
1994	15 September 1988	Lillehammer	Norway	25	30	45	—	—	—	(Norway) Lillehammer
1994	15 September 1988	Östersund	Sweden	19	33	39	—	—	—	(Norway) Lillehammer
1994	15 September 1988	Anchorage	United States	23	22	—	—	—	—	(Norway) Lillehammer
1994	15 September 1988	Sofia	Bulgaria	17	—	—	—	—	—	(Norway) Lillehammer
1998	15 June 1991	Nagano	Japan	21	—	30	36	46	—	(Japan) Nagano
1998	15 June 1991	Salt Lake City	United States	15	59	27	29	42	—	(Japan) Nagano
1998	15 June 1991	Östersund	Sweden	18	—	25	23	—	—	(Japan) Nagano
1998	15 June 1991	Jaca	Spain	19	—	5	—	—	—	(Japan) Nagano
1998	15 June 1991	Aosta	Italy	15	29	—	—	—	—	(Japan) Nagano
2002	16 June 1995	Salt Lake City	United States	54	—	—	—	—	—	(United States) Salt Lake City
2002	16 June 1995	Östersund	Sweden	14	—	—	—	—	—	(United States) Salt Lake City
2002	16 June 1995	Sion	Switzerland	14	—	—	—	—	—	(United States) Salt Lake City
2002	16 June 1995	Quebec City	Canada	7	—	—	—	—	—	(United States) Salt Lake City
2002	16 June 1995	Graz	Austria	—	—	—	—	—	—	(United States) Salt Lake City
2002	16 June 1995	Jaca	Spain	—	—	—	—	—	—	(United States) Salt Lake City
2002	16 June 1995	Poprad-Tatry	Slovakia	—	—	—	—	—	—	(United States) Salt Lake City
2002	16 June 1995	Sochi	Russia	—	—	—	—	—	—	(United States) Salt Lake City
2002	16 June 1995	Tarvisio	Italy	—	—	—	—	—	—	(United States) Salt Lake City
2006	19 June 1999	Turin	Italy	53	—	—	—	—	—	(Italy) Turin
2006	19 June 1999	Sion	Switzerland	36	—	—	—	—	—	(Italy) Turin
2006	19 June 1999	Helsinki	Finland	—	—	—	—	—	—	(Italy) Turin
2006	19 June 1999	Klagenfurt	Austria	—	—	—	—	—	—	(Italy) Turin
2006	19 June 1999	Poprad-Tatry	Slovakia	—	—	—	—	—	—	(Italy) Turin
2006	19 June 1999	Zakopane	Poland	—	—	—	—	—	—	(Italy) Turin
2010	2 July 2003	Vancouver	Canada	40	56	—	—	—	—	(Canada) Vancouver
2010	2 July 2003	Pyeongchang	South Korea	51	53	—	—	—	—	(Canada) Vancouver
2010	2 July 2003	Salzburg	Austria	16	—	—	—	—	—	(Canada) Vancouver
2010	2 July 2003	Andorra la Vella	Andorra	—	—	—	—	—	—	(Canada) Vancouver
2010	2 July 2003	Bern	Switzerland	—	—	—	—	—	—	(Canada) Vancouver
2010	2 July 2003	Harbin	China	—	—	—	—	—	—	(Canada) Vancouver
2010	2 July 2003	Jaca	Spain	—	—	—	—	—	—	(Canada) Vancouver
2010	2 July 2003	Sarajevo	Bosnia and Herzegovina	—	—	—	—	—	—	(Canada) Vancouver
2014	4 July 2007	Sochi	Russia	34	51	—	—	—	—	(Russia) Sochi
2014	4 July 2007	Pyeongchang	South Korea	36	47	—	—	—	—	(Russia) Sochi
2014	4 July 2007	Salzburg	Austria	25	—	—	—	—	—	(Russia) Sochi
2014	4 July 2007	Almaty	Kazakhstan	—	—	—	—	—	—	(Russia) Sochi
2014	4 July 2007	Borjomi	Georgia	—	—	—	—	—	—	(Russia) Sochi
2014	4 July 2007	Jaca	Spain	—	—	—	—	—	—	(Russia) Sochi
2014	4 July 2007	Sofia	Bulgaria	—	—	—	—	—	—	(Russia) Sochi
2018	6 July 2011	Pyeongchang	South Korea	63	—	—	—	—	—	(South Korea) Pyeongchang
2018	6 July 2011	Munich	Germany	25	—	—	—	—	—	(South Korea) Pyeongchang
2018	6 July 2011	Annecy	France	7	—	—	—	—	—	(South Korea) Pyeongchang
2022	31 July 2015	Beijing	China	44	—	—	—	—	—	(China) Beijing
2022	31 July 2015	Almaty	Kazakhstan	40	—	—	—	—	—	(China) Beijing
2022	31 July 2015	Oslo	Norway	Withdrew						(China) Beijing
2022	31 July 2015	Kraków	Poland	Withdrew						(China) Beijing
2022	31 July 2015	Lviv	Ukraine	Withdrew						(China) Beijing
2022	31 July 2015	Stockholm	Sweden	Withdrew						(China) Beijing
2026	24 June 2019	Milan-Cortina d'Ampezzo	Italy	47	—	—	—	—	—	(Italy) Milan-Cortina d'Ampezzo
2026	24 June 2019	Stockholm-Åre	Sweden	34	—	—	—	—	—	(Italy) Milan-Cortina d'Ampezzo
2026	24 June 2019	Erzurum	Turkey	Did not make the shortlist						(Italy) Milan-Cortina d'Ampezzo
2026	24 June 2019	Calgary	Canada	Withdrew						(Italy) Milan-Cortina d'Ampezzo
2026	24 June 2019	Graz	Austria	Withdrew						(Italy) Milan-Cortina d'Ampezzo
2026	24 June 2019	Sapporo	Japan	Withdrew						(Italy) Milan-Cortina d'Ampezzo
2026	24 June 2019	Sion	Switzerland	Withdrew						(Italy) Milan-Cortina d'Ampezzo
2030	24 July 2024	Provence-Alpes-Côte d'Azur and Auvergne-Rhône-Alpes	France	84 Yes, 4 No, 7 Abstention (95.5% of valid votes)						(France) French Alps
2030	24 July 2024	Stockholm - Åre	Sweden	Did not advance to targeted dialogue phase						(France) French Alps
2030	24 July 2024	Switzerland	Switzerland	Did not advance to targeted dialogue phase						(France) French Alps
2030	24 July 2024	Barcelona and Zaragoza - Pyrenees	Spain	Withdrew						(France) French Alps
2030	24 July 2024	Vancouver	Canada	Withdrew						(France) French Alps
2030	24 July 2024	Sapporo	Japan	Withdrew						(France) French Alps
2034	24 July 2024	Salt Lake City - Utah	United States	83 Yes, 6 No, 6 Abstention (93.3% of valid votes)						(United States) Utah

== By city ==
The following is a list of bids submitted by city. It lists the national Olympic committee, the city, and the games for which failed and successful bid were submitted. A parenthesis indicates that the city was awarded the games without a bidding process. A dagger (†) indicates that the city was awarded the games, but that they were ultimately not held in the city, either because the games were canceled or moved. An asterisk (*) indicates that the bid was not shortlisted. A double asterisk (**) indicates that the bid was withdrawn.

Country	City	Failed/Withdrawn bids	Successful bids
Andorra	Andorra la Vella	2010*	—
Austria	Graz	2002*, 2026**	—
Austria	Innsbruck	1960	1964, (1976)
Austria	Klagenfurt	2006*	—
Austria	Salzburg	2010, 2014	—
Bulgaria	Sofia	1992, 1994, 2014*	—
Canada	Banff	1972	—
Canada	Calgary	1964, 1968, 2026**	1988
Canada	Montreal	1932, 1936, 1944, 1956	—
Canada	Quebec City	2002	—
Canada	Vancouver	1976, 1980, 2030**	2010
China	Beijing	—	2022
China	Harbin	2010*	—
Finland	Helsinki	2006*	—
Finland	Lahti	1964, 1968, 1972	—
Finland	Tampere	1976	—
France	Albertville	—	1992
France	Annecy	2018	—
France	Grenoble	—	1968
France	Provence-Alpes-Côte d'Azur and Auvergne-Rhône-Alpes	2030	—
Georgia	Borjomi	2014*	—
Germany	Berchtesgaden	1992	—
Germany	Garmisch-Partenkirchen	1960	1936
Germany	Munich	2018	—
Italy	Cortina d'Ampezzo	1944, 1952, 1988, 1992	1956, 2026
Italy	Milan	—	2026
Italy	Turin	—	2006
Japan	Nagano	—	1998
Japan	Sapporo	1968, 1984, 2026**, 2030**	1972
Kazakhstan	Almaty	2014*, 2022	—
Norway	Lillehammer	1992	1994
Norway	Oslo	1932, 1944, 1968, 2022**	1952
Poland	Zakopane	2006*	—
Poland	Kraków	2022**	—
Russia	Sochi	2002*	2014
Slovakia	Poprad-Tatry	2006*	—
South Korea	Pyeongchang	2010, 2014	2018
Spain	Jaca	1998, 2002*, 2010*, 2014*	—
Spain	Barcelona and Zaragoza - Pyrenees	2030**	—
Sweden	Falun	1988, 1992	—
Sweden	Åre	2026, 2030	—
Sweden	Gothenburg	1984	—
Sweden	Östersund	1994, 1998, 2002	—
Sweden	Stockholm	2022**, 2026, 2030	—
Switzerland	Bern	2010*	—
Switzerland	Davos	1928	—
Switzerland	Engelberg	1928	—
Switzerland	Sion	1976, 2002, 2006, 2026**	—
Switzerland	St. Moritz	1936, 1960	1928, 1948
Turkey	Erzurum	2026*	—
Ukraine	Lviv	2022**	—
United States	Anchorage	1992, 1994	—
United States	Bear Mountain	1932	—
United States	Colorado Springs	1956	—
United States	Denver	1932	1976†
United States	Duluth	1932	—
United States	Lake Placid	1948, 1952, 1956, 1968	1932, 1980
United States	Lake Tahoe	1932	—
United States	Minneapolis	1932	—
United States	Salt Lake City	1972, 1998	2002, 2034
United States	Squaw Valley	—	1960
United States	Yosemite Valley	1932	—
Yugoslavia/Bosnia and Herzegovina	Sarajevo	2010*	1984

== By country ==
The following is a list of bids submitted by national Olympic committee, listing the country and years it bid. Only countries that have submitted bids from multiple cities are included. Successful bids are in boldface. Parenthesis/Brackets indicates that the city was awarded the games without a bidding process. A dagger (†) indicates that the city was awarded the games, but that they were ultimately not held in the city, either because the games were canceled or moved.

Country	Years
Austria	1960, **1964**, **(1976)**, 2002, 2006, 2010, 2014, 2026
Canada	1932, 1936, 1944, 1956, 1964, 1968, 1972, 1976, 1980, **1988**, 2002, **2010**, 2026, 2030
China	2010, **2022**
Finland	1964, 1968, 1972, 1976, 2006
France	**1924**, **1968**, **1992**, 2018, **2030**
Germany	**1936**, 1960, 1992, 2018
Italy	1952, **1956**, 1988, 1992, 1998, **2006**, **2026**
Japan	1968, **1972**, 1984, **1998**, 2026, 2030
Norway	1932, 1944, **1952**, 1968, 1992, **1994**, 2022
Poland	2006, 2022
Spain	1998, 2002, 2010, 2014, 2030
Sweden	1984, 1988, 1992, 1994, 1998, 2002, 2022, 2026, 2030
Switzerland	**1928**, 1936, **1948**, 1960, 1976, 2002, 2006, 2010, 2026, 2030, 2038
United States	**1932**, 1948, 1952, 1956, **1960**, 1972, **1976**†, **1980**, 1992, 1994, 1998, **2002**, **2034**
Mexico	2030

== See also ==
- Bids for Olympic Games
- List of bids for the Summer Olympics
