= Salt Lake City bids for the Winter Olympics =

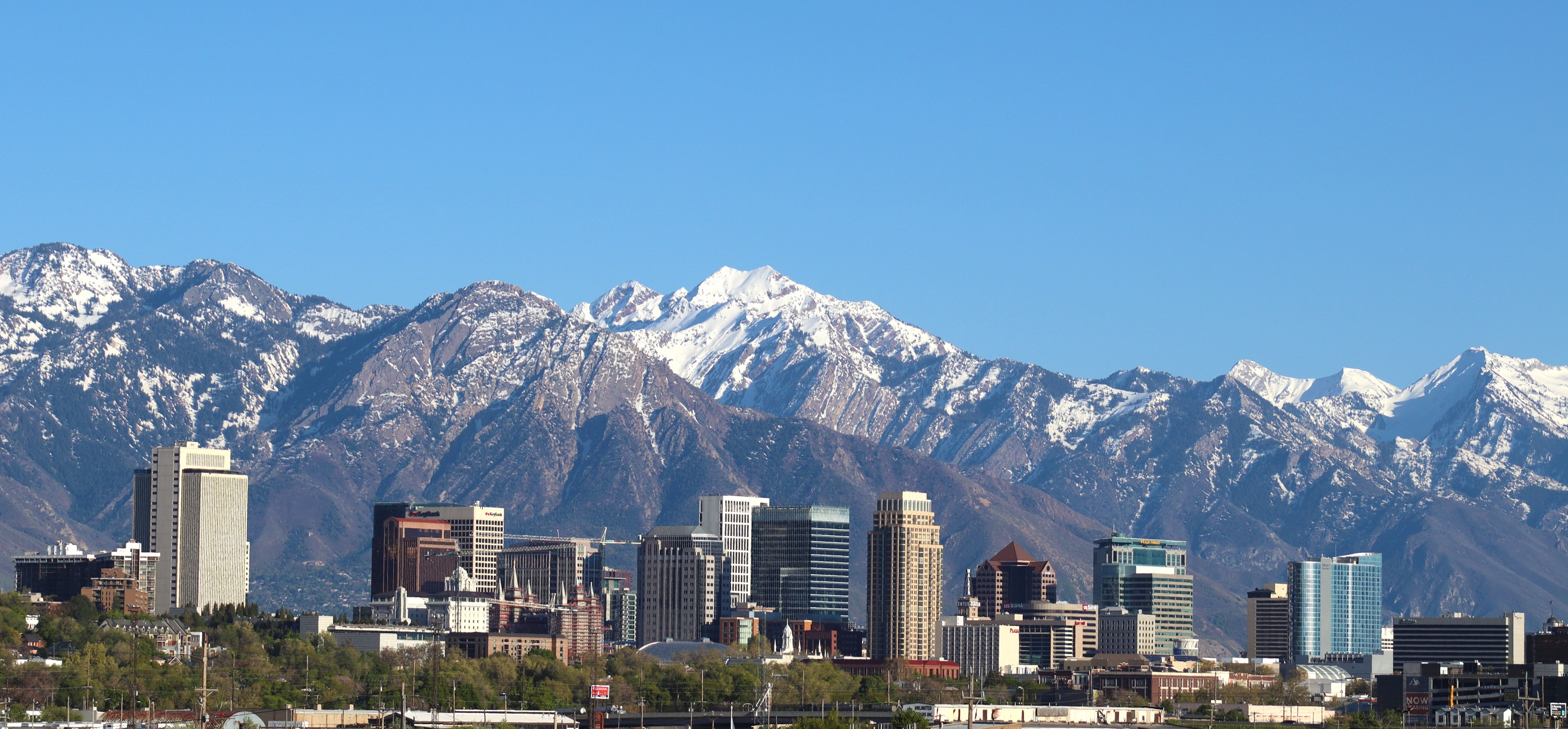
The skyline of Salt Lake City.

Salt Lake City, Utah, has been chosen on four occasions by the U.S. Olympic Committee (USOC) as the United States candidate city to bid for the Winter Olympic Games. It has been chosen by the International Olympic Committee (IOC) as the host city twice, holding the 2002 Winter Olympics and preparing to host the 2034 Winter Olympics.

== Background ==
The possibility of hosting the Winter Olympics was casually discussed by winter sports groups in the Salt Lake City area as early as 1928. Inspired by the occurrence of the second Winter Olympic Games in St. Moritz, Switzerland, that year, the Amateur Athletic Union discussed Salt Lake City's prospects for a potential bid for the 1932 Winter Olympics. However, Salt Lake City was not one of the seven American cities that ultimately submitted bids to the IOC for the 1932 Games, which were awarded to Lake Placid, New York.

In 1955, when Squaw Valley (now Olympic Valley), California, was chosen by the USOC to bid for the 1960 Winter Olympics, Salt Lake City residents protested that their area was not fairly considered because they had been unaware of the new bidding process, in which the USOC would choose one city that could bid to the IOC. Deseret News columnist Hack Miller said that the Alta Ski Area was one of the nation's best venues and complained that "someone here must have been asleep" to not present a bid to the USOC.

A preliminary group advocating for the Winter Olympics in Salt Lake City was founded in 1960. In June 1962, Ski Utah Associates approached the USOC with a proposal to host the 1968 Winter Olympics. Specific sites for Olympic events were not selected for the bid. The only other candidate that applied to the USOC with a bid for 1968 was Lake Placid, New York. On October 16, 1962, in a meeting in Chicago, the USOC picked Lake Placid over Salt Lake City as its bid to the IOC. Ski Utah Associates officials were not disappointed by the decision, believing that there would have been "some rough spots to iron out" if Salt Lake City had been chosen, and saying that the experience would make the city better prepared to bid for the 1972 Winter Olympics.

== 1972 ==
Bids for the 1972 Winter Olympics
Overview
- XI Olympic Winter Games
- Winner: Sapporo; Runner-up: Banff; Shortlist: Lahti · Salt Lake City

Details
- City: Salt Lake City, Utah, USA
- Chair: Maxwell Rich
- NOC: U.S. Olympic Committee

Previous Games hosted
- None

Decision
- Result: Tied for last place

Utah governor Cal Rampton convened an Olympic Proposal Committee to plan for a potential 1972 bid. Rampton announced the bid at the inaugural All-Utah Travel and Recreation Show on February 5, 1965. Maxwell Rich, secretary of the Salt Lake City Chamber of Commerce, was appointed as the committee's chairman, and he subsequently became president of Olympics for Utah, Inc. (OUI!), which presented the bid.

At first, the Olympic bid effort was intended mostly as a publicity stunt to drive more tourists to Utah's ski resorts, but OUI quickly grew more serious. In April 1965, when a brief controversy over the visa status of the East German team threatened to upend the upcoming 1968 Winter Olympics in Grenoble, France, Rich wrote to IOC president Avery Brundage to volunteer as a replacement host.

The Salt Lake City bid faced competition from two other candidates seeking USOC approval to bid for 1972: Lake Placid, which was trying again after losing the 1968 Games to Grenoble, and the state of Colorado. All three sought the influential endorsement of the U.S. Ski Association (USSA) at its annual convention in Spokane, Washington, in June 1965. At the convention, the Colorado Olympic Commission announced that it would not bid for 1972 and was endorsing Salt Lake City, on the condition that Utah officials would endorse Colorado in a potential future bid for the 1976 Winter Olympics. Lake Placid, meanwhile, told the USSA that it would make its presentation later, possibly at the group's 1966 convention. As a result, the USSA endorsed Salt Lake City's bid.

While initially preparing its bid, the Utah committee believed that it would have until 1967 to prepare its final presentations to the USOC and the IOC, as previous Winter Olympics hosts had been chosen four or five years before the Games were to be held. However, late in 1965, it became known that the IOC was planning to award hosting duties for both 1972's Summer and Winter games at its 64th Session in Rome in April 1966. Furthermore, the IOC set a deadline of December 15, 1965, for all candidate cities to submit their applications. This deadline was pushed back to December 31 and later to January 20, 1966, but it forced the USOC to accelerate its process for choosing the U.S. candidate city. The USOC informed interested cities on December 1, 1965, that they would need to prepare their formal bids in time for a committee meeting in Chicago the following month.

At the Chicago meeting on January 16, 1966, Governor Rampton delivered Salt Lake City's presentation in person. The USOC voted by a wide margin to select Salt Lake City as the U.S. candidate, with the city receiving 36 of the 42 available votes. Lake Placid received the other six, while a short-lived bid from Anchorage, Alaska had none.

On April 25, 1966, the IOC voted to award the 1972 Winter Olympics to Sapporo, Japan, which received a majority of the votes on the first ballot. Salt Lake City was tied with Lahti, Finland, for last place among the four candidate cities, each receiving seven votes.

=== Venues ===
The Olympics for Utah, Inc., bid book listed the following venues that would be used.

| Venue | Events |
|---|---|
| University of Utah Sports Bowl | Opening and closing ceremonies |
| Civic Auditorium | Figure skating Ice hockey Communications center |
| Gad Valley, Alta Ski Area | Alpine skiing |
| Heber City | Alpine skiing |
| Deer Valley, Keetley | Alpine skiing |
| Mount Baldy and Treasure Mountain, Park City Mountain Resort | Alpine skiing |
| Snowbasin Resort | Alpine skiing |
| Solitude Mountain Resort | Alpine skiing |
| State Exposition Center Stadium; Utah State Fairgrounds | Speed skating |
| Nordic Center (Mountain Dell Golf Course, Parleys Canyon) | Biathlon; Bobsled; Cross-country skiing Luge; Ski jumping |
| Sugar House | Practice rink for figure skating, ice hockey |
| Fort Douglas | Olympic Village |
| University of Utah | Olympic Center (administrative facilities) |

== 1976 ==
Governor Cal Rampton received the news that Salt Lake City had been rejected by the IOC as 1972 host while attending the Western Governors Conference in Las Vegas, Nevada, and immediately vowed that "we will make a definite bid for 1976". The city's bid was made official at a USOC meeting in Chicago on February 26, 1967. Other cities proposing their bids at the same meeting were Denver, Colorado; Lake Placid; Seattle, Washington; Waterbury, Vermont; and the Sugarloaf Mountain ski area in Franklin County, Maine.

Waterbury was removed from contention in September, while Sugarloaf's bid was withdrawn in November. The USOC heard presentations from the remaining four cities in a meeting in New York City on December 17, 1967. In the subsequent voting, Seattle came in last place and was removed after the first ballot, while Salt Lake City was removed after reportedly receiving only nine votes on the second ballot. The final vote was between Denver and Lake Placid, Denver winning with 26 votes to Lake Placid's 17.

Some, including an unidentified member of the USOC, attributed Salt Lake City's surprising margin of defeat to a reputation for racial discrimination in Utah. The USOC was said to be particularly mindful of potential racism because of the ongoing threatened boycott of the 1968 Summer Olympics over the inclusion of apartheid South Africa. Utah's restrictive liquor laws were also cited as a factor in the decision. Salt Lake City organizers discussed the possibility of bidding for the 1980 Winter Olympics in the event that Denver was not chosen as the host for 1976.

Denver won its bid to host the 1976 Winter Olympics at the 70th IOC Session in Amsterdam on May 12, 1970. However, on November 7, 1972, a referendum to fund some of the event's costs with taxpayer money was rejected by Denver voters. On November 15, Denver officially withdrew from hosting duties, becoming the first city to do so. Salt Lake City mayor Jake Garn quickly offered to step in as a replacement host, as did representatives from Lake Placid and the Lake Tahoe area. However, a survey published by the Deseret News on November 21 found that 87% of respondents were opposed to hosting the Olympics in Salt Lake City, many of them citing the same cost concerns as Denver voters.

In a meeting on January 4, 1973, in New York City, the USOC unanimously chose Salt Lake City as its replacement nominee over Lake Placid and two bids from the Lake Tahoe area. Lake Placid organizers protested the decision, accusing the USOC of bias toward the West, and decided to appeal directly to the IOC to be considered as a replacement host. A delegation led by Mayor Garn traveled to Washington to request financial assistance for Salt Lake City's bid from the federal government, but did not receive any guarantees of funding. As a result, Salt Lake City withdrew its bid on January 30, five days before the IOC would choose a new host city.

The next day, the USOC nominated Lake Placid as its candidate city. While the IOC had set a deadline of January 15 for all candidate cities to submit their bids, Lake Placid's candidacy was accepted. At its extraordinary session in Lausanne, Switzerland, on February 4, Lake Placid lost to Innsbruck, Austria, which ultimately hosted the 1976 Winter Olympics. Salt Lake City Chamber of Commerce president Fred Ball, who was present at the Lausanne session, later recalled being told that the United States would never be allowed to host the Olympics again after the Denver fiasco.

Salt Lake City ultimately did not submit a bid for the 1980 Winter Olympics. Lake Placid, the only U.S. candidate for those games, was approved by the USOC in a meeting in New York City on November 18, 1973. After all other bids at the international level were withdrawn, Lake Placid was unanimously awarded the 1980 Winter Olympics at the 75th IOC Session in Vienna, Austria, on October 23, 1974.

== 1992 ==
Interest in hosting the Winter Olympics in Salt Lake City was revived in 1984. Utah governor Scott M. Matheson visited USOC headquarters in Colorado Springs in April 1984 to discuss the possibility of a bid for the 1992 or 1996 Winter Olympics. In November, a Salt Lake Tribune poll found that 73 percent of Utahns supported hosting the Winter Olympics, while only 13 percent opposed the idea. While the USOC had not yet chosen a candidate city for the 1992 Winter Olympics, Utah officials preferred a bid for the 1996 Games, as they would have more time to prepare, and that year would mark the state's centennial. Also, since the 1988 Winter Olympics were to be held in Calgary, Alberta, it was considered unlikely that the continent of North America would be chosen twice in a row.

Utah Winter Games Feasibility Committee, Inc., a non-profit group co-chaired by Salt Lake City mayor Ted Wilson and Utah governor Norman H. Bangerter, was created in September 1984. The committee's first responsibility was to raise funds for a study of Utah's Olympic prospects. In February 1985, with the study underway and expected to take months before deciding whether to launch a bid for 1996, members of the committee traveled to Calgary to meet with IOC officials who were overseeing preparations for the 1988 Winter Olympics. There, they learned that the USOC was preparing to choose a candidate city for 1992, and that submitting a bid for 1992 would make Salt Lake City much more likely to be seriously considered for 1996. However, the IOC required all countries to choose their candidate cities for 1992 no later than May 15, while the Utah committee was not prepared to decide on a 1996 bid until September at the earliest.

The Feasibility Committee was thrust into what Mayor Wilson called a "semi-panic situation", as it debated whether to pursue a bid for 1992 without being fully prepared. One committee member, state senator Fred W. Finlinson, pointed out that Calgary had not performed a feasibility study until after winning the right to host the 1988 games, and that many of the other U.S. cities then bidding for 1992 had not conducted studies either. On the other hand, Sierra Club representative and committee member Alexis Kelner, who had criticized the committee for spending money on the fact-finding trip to Calgary, confronted the mayor at a committee meeting on March 11 to which Kelner had not been invited, calling these rushed actions "very, very sleazy" and saying that submitting a bid before the study was complete defeated the purpose of the study. Wilson admitted that "sometimes when you're under pressure you don't have time for the niceties of life", but continued to press for immediate action.

On March 15, the Feasibility Committee agreed that it would not submit a bid to the USOC, with members deciding that their only goal was to study the feasibility of hosting the Games. Instead, they suggested that a second group should be set up by the mayor and the governor of Utah, the Feasibility Committee's co-chairs, with the specific purpose of actually bidding for the Olympics. Rather than founding a new organization, Mayor Wilson offered the task to the Salt Lake Area Chamber of Commerce, being an established group with experience in promoting the area, and with its president, Fred S. Ball, having been involved in Salt Lake City's 1968, 1972, and 1976 bids. The Chamber of Commerce took on the job, beginning to assemble the bid on April 1, ahead of a USOC deadline on May 1. As the work began, Ball told the Salt Lake Tribune, "we should be doing this in a period of 12 months rather than one month. We're not prepared for this new date. But we feel we have to give it our best." Utah senator and former Salt Lake City mayor Jake Garn, then preparing to launch into space on the STS-51-D Space Shuttle mission, agreed to auction off a T-shirt he wore during the mission to help raise funds for the Chamber of Commerce bid effort.

The Chamber of Commerce delivered its response to the USOC's questionnaire on May 1, hours before the deadline. On the same day, the Feasibility Committee received the study it had commissioned from a Calgary-based firm, which concluded that Salt Lake City was more likely than not to become the USOC's candidate for 1992 and had an "excellent chance" of hosting the games in 1996. The study proposed the construction of a road tunnel connecting Brighton Ski Resort, at the tip of Big Cottonwood Canyon, with Alta Ski Area in Little Cottonwood Canyon, provoking criticism from local environmentalist groups. The Utah Audubon Society announced its official opposition to the bid, citing the tunnel as an example of long-term damage that would be caused by hosting the Olympics.

Acknowledging these concerns, the Salt Lake City Council nonetheless unanimously voted to support the city's Olympic bid on June 11, four days before the USOC would choose an American host candidate. The city council considered scheduling a citywide referendum for the next municipal ballot on November 5, 1985, but rejected that idea in favor of asking Governor Bangerter, who was present at the meeting, to press for a statewide referendum. The council also placed a moratorium on new water sales in Big and Little Cottonwood Canyons to address concerns about overdevelopment there.

Four other cities competed against Salt Lake City for the USOC's approval as the 1992 candidate: Anchorage, Alaska, Lake Placid, New York (which had hosted the 1932 and 1980 Winter Olympics), the Reno–Lake Tahoe area of Nevada, and Portland, Oregon. Portland dropped out of contention in May, intending to focus on a bid for 1996. The other four cities made presentations to the Executive Board of the USOC during its annual meeting in Indianapolis, Indiana, on June 15, 1985. While the exact results of the Board's vote that afternoon were not disclosed, Anchorage's bid was selected quickly, reportedly on the first ballot. The decision came as a surprise to many, as Anchorage had had a similar late start to Salt Lake City in preparing its bid and was not considered a favorite going into the vote.

Utah organizers continued to prepare for a potential 1996 bid, although with less urgency than before, especially since it was assumed that Anchorage would have a significant advantage in being nominated by the USOC again. The host city for the 1992 Winter Olympics was chosen at the 91st IOC Session in Lausanne, Switzerland, on October 17, 1986. Anchorage and five other cities were eliminated in favor of Albertville, France. The Utah Department of Community and Economic Development sent a representative to gather more information at the IOC's Lausanne meeting, where it was decided that future Winter Olympics would be held in alternate even years from the Summer Olympics, meaning that the Winter Olympics after 1992 would be held in 1994, not 1996 as previously expected.

At the next USOC meeting, held on November 23, 1986, in Sparks, Nevada, the board nominated Anchorage as the U.S. candidate city for 1994. Despite protests from Salt Lake City organizers, as well as their counterparts in Portland and Reno–Tahoe, the board members voted 44–14 to select Anchorage without any opportunity for presentations from other cities. USOC president Bob Helmick told the meeting that, with only two years to prepare for the next bidding process, Anchorage's recent bidding experience made it the only American city that could win. The host city for the 1994 Winter Olympics was chosen on September 15, 1988, at the 94th IOC Session in Seoul, South Korea, shortly before the opening of the 1988 Summer Olympics there. Among four candidate cities, Anchorage was the second to be eliminated, while Lillehammer, Norway, was selected as the host city.

== 1998 ==
Bids for the 1998 Winter Olympics and Paralympics
Overview
- XVIII Olympic Winter Games; VII Paralympic Winter Games
- Winner: Nagano; Runner-up: Salt Lake City; Shortlist: Östersund · Jaca · Aosta

Details
- City: Salt Lake City, Utah, USA
- Chair: Tom Welch
- NOC: U.S. Olympic Committee

Previous Games hosted
- None

Decision
- Result: Second place

=== USOC candidacy ===
Immediately upon returning from the meeting in Sparks, Tom Welch, who had been a committee chair on Salt Lake City's 1992 bid, told the city council and the local press that the city was well-positioned to make a bid for 1998. Welch traveled to Calgary in January 1987 to observe preparations for the 1988 Winter Olympics there.

The Utah Sports Foundation took up the cause of preparing for a 1998 bid. Originally a state agency, the foundation was privatized in January 1988. Its executive director, David R. Johnson, was also the executive director of Better Utah Inc., which had been founded in 1984 to assist the city's previous bid. These groups successfully lobbied to host several smaller-scale athletic events in the region, and received tens of thousands of dollars from the city's Civic Opportunities Fund to support those efforts. However, after Anchorage was rejected as 1994 host by the IOC and interest in bidding for the 1998 games grew in Salt Lake City, Better Utah came under greater financial scrutiny. In November 1988, the city council asked Better Utah to turn over its financial records to show how it had spent a recent $20,160 grant from the city. The audit found that poor record-keeping made it difficult to determine exactly what had been done with the money. After the audit, the city council took over preparations for a 1998 bid, creating a Salt Lake City Winter Games Organizing Committee chaired by Welch in December 1988.

In November 1988, the USOC created new rules for candidate host cities, requiring all candidates to begin construction on sports facilities before being selected by the IOC. This was done to ensure that, whether the city won the games or not, the U.S. would gain state-of-the-art training facilities for winter sports with less popularity. On February 15, 1989, the Utah House of Representatives approved a measure which would divert 1/64th of one percent of all state and local sales taxes (about $4 million per year) to the construction of such facilities for bobsleigh, luge, and speed skating. The use of public money for construction was to be contingent on the approval of Utah voters in a referendum in November 1989. The passage of the bill gave Salt Lake City an advantage over other candidate cities, some of which promptly began seeking public financing from their state governments. It particularly helped Salt Lake City compete against Anchorage, the U.S. candidate city for the previous two Winter Olympics, where most Alaska state legislators were opposed to providing the Olympic bid with public money.

Alongside Salt Lake City and Anchorage, the cities seeking the USOC's nomination were Denver, Lake Placid, Reno–Tahoe, and Klamath Falls, Oregon. The USOC initially planned to choose one of the six cities in June 1989, but considered pushing this back to October to allow the candidates more time to prepare their bids. Denver, Klamath Falls, and Reno supported the postponement, but Anchorage, Lake Placid, and Salt Lake City opposed it, on the grounds that they were fully prepared already. The decision was ultimately not postponed. Lake Placid dropped out of contention in March, its representatives saying that the USOC clearly preferred a site in the West. Klamath Falls withdrew its bid in May after learning that candidates were required to submit detailed data that the city did not have.

The USOC's Executive Board met in Des Moines, Iowa, on June 4, 1989, to choose the U.S. candidate city for the 1998 Winter Olympics. Before the final vote, the USOC agreed that the American candidate for 1998, if it was not selected as the host city, would be allowed to bid for 2002 without having to compete against other U.S. cities. While the exact numbers of votes each city received were not disclosed, Denver was reportedly eliminated after coming in last place in the first ballot, and Salt Lake City received the majority of votes in the second ballot over Anchorage and Reno. Thus, Salt Lake City became the U.S. nominee for the 1998 Winter Olympics.

=== IOC candidacy ===
Salt Lake City's bid was dependent on a statewide referendum approving the use of $56 million in state and local sales tax revenues to construct Olympic venues. State and city officials said they would stop supporting the Olympic bid if the referendum failed, although Tom Welch suggested that the Olympics could still be held if the lost public funding was replaced with private donations. Supporters of the bid created Olympics for Utah Inc., a campaign entity using the same name as the 1972 bid committee, to encourage the "yes" vote. Opposition was led by Utahns for Responsible Public Spending, an organization chaired by Alexis Kelner, who had been a prominent critic of the 1992 bid. Kelner did not expect to defeat the referendum, but his group pressured the state to make specific promises: that no other taxes would be used to fund the Olympics, and that no events would be held in Big or Little Cottonwood Canyon. The Utah Office of Planning and Budget estimated that the average Utah family would pay $75 toward the construction of Olympic venues and, if the games were held in Salt Lake City, would receive $498 from the resulting growth of the state economy. When the referendum was held on November 7, 1989, the question was approved by 57 percent of voters, less than expected by both its supporters and opponents. Support for the measure was higher in the Salt Lake City metropolitan area, with 72 percent voting yes in Summit County where many of the new venues would be built. The strongest opposition was found in outlying rural areas of the state.

USOC rules required construction to begin on the new venues no later than 18 months after the city was nominated, creating a deadline of December 1990, months before the IOC would choose a host city. Furthermore, the facilities were expected to be complete by June 1992, regardless of whether or not the city was selected for 1998. A location in Bear Hollow in Summit County, now the Utah Olympic Park, was chosen for the largest complex, consisting of the ski jumping, bobsleigh, and luge runs. After delays caused by protests from a neighboring property owner, preliminary site work began just before the December 1990 deadline. A groundbreaking ceremony was held on May 29, 1991, two weeks before the IOC vote. Also required was the construction of a speed skating oval, but a site was not chosen and construction did not begin before the host city selection.

The host city for the 1998 Winter Olympics was chosen on June 15, 1991, at the 97th IOC Session in Birmingham, England. In the first round of voting, the five cities were nearly evenly matched, all receiving between 15 and 21 votes. Salt Lake City tied for last place with Aosta, Italy, apparently because some IOC members who favored the American bid wanted to show their support for a less popular candidate in the first round. Salt Lake City received two-thirds of votes in a runoff against Aosta, then remained in second place behind Nagano, Japan, in each of the subsequent rounds. On the final ballot, Salt Lake City narrowly lost, with 42 votes against 46, making Nagano the host for 1998.

The bid's loss was attributed in part to Atlanta having recently been awarded the 1996 Summer Olympics, and the IOC's reluctance to award two events in quick succession to the same country. Andrew Young, a former mayor of Atlanta and a chair of the 1996 organizing committee, embraced Tom Welch after the decision, saying "We cost you at least four votes, and I will help you next time." Another factor mentioned in analyses of Salt Lake City's loss was the passage of one of the nation's most restrictive abortion laws in Utah in January 1991. The National Organization for Women staged a letter-writing campaign asking IOC officials not to hold the Olympics in the "anti-woman, anti-choice state of Utah". Packets criticizing the abortion law were slipped under the hotel room doors of IOC members before the vote. The U.S. voting member of the IOC, Anita DeFrantz, and USOC chairman Bob Helmick said that they did not hear any IOC members mention the abortion issue in their deliberations.

=== Venues ===
The venues planned to be used for the 1998 Winter Olympics in Salt Lake City were the same as those actually used in the 2002 Winter Olympics, with the following exceptions:

- Biathlon and cross-country skiing would have been held at Mountain Dell.
- Ice hockey finals would have been held at the Salt Lake Sports Arena.
- Speed skating would have been held at the Salt Lake Speed Skating Oval, a purpose-built venue 2 km (1.2 mi) from the Olympic Village at the University of Utah.

== 2002 ==
Bids for the 2002 Winter Olympics and Paralympics
Overview
- XIX Olympic Winter Games; VIII Paralympic Winter Games
- Winner: Salt Lake City; Runner-up: Östersund; Shortlist: Sion · Quebec City

Details
- City: Salt Lake City, Utah, USA
- Chair: Tom Welch
- NOC: U.S. Olympic Committee

Previous Games hosted
- None

Decision
- Result: Won

=== Construction ===
Construction on the Utah Olympic Park in Summit County was not interrupted by the loss of the 1998 bid. In August 1991, organizers met with Governor Bangerter to begin preparations for a 2002 bid committee. In its next meeting in Colorado Springs on November 3, the USOC board of directors unanimously affirmed that Salt Lake City could bid for the 2002 Winter Olympics without facing competition from other American cities. The USOC also loosened the requirements that it had previously placed on new venue construction, allowing work to be delayed by up to two years. This was done in part because venue construction was behind schedule, and also because the IOC was reportedly considering altering or eliminating bobsleigh and luge in the Winter Olympics program.

With the location of the speed skating venue still undetermined at the time of the IOC vote, the Utah Sports Authority continued working to choose a site. In July 1992, the Authority chose Block 49 of downtown Salt Lake City as its preferred location. However, the block was planned as the site of a 167-unit housing development, which was already under construction at the time. Tearing down the partially-built apartments to construct the venue was controversial, especially when it was noted that the Block 49 proposal was more expensive than other potential venue locations. The city withdrew the Block 49 proposal in September, proposing the Salt Palace as an alternative location. The Authority instead chose a site at the Oquirrh Park Fitness Center in nearby Kearns in October.

At the time of the host city selection in 1995, eight of the nine venues which were planned for use in the Olympics had already been built. The unfinished venue was the proposed Salt Lake Ice Arena for short track speed skating, which was never built and its events moved to the Delta Center. After the Games were awarded, several other changes were made to these plans (see Venues section below and Venues of the 2002 Winter Olympics). The E Center, Peaks Ice Arena, and Soldier Hollow were built for the Olympics as a result of these changes in plans.

=== Relationships with IOC members ===
Salt Lake City organizers believed that they had lost the 1998 games to Nagano because of close relationships between IOC members and Japanese organizers. In October 1991, the newly organized Salt Lake City 2002 bid committee printed a mission statement, which stated that one of the committee's goals was to "establish and maintain long-term, vote influencing relationships with IOC members." Toward this goal, the committee created an "NOC Support Program", ostensibly intended to financially support sport organizations in developing countries.

In October, the son of an IOC member from Eswatini began attending the University of Utah, his tuition and living expenses paid by the bid committee. He was the first of 13 students whose tuition was paid by the committee, six of whom were close relatives of IOC voting members. At the extreme, the bid committee paid $108,350 to cover the tuition costs of the daughter of the IOC voting member from Cameroon. Other close relationships were forged between Salt Lake City organizers and the families of IOC members during this time. In one prominent example, Jean-Claude Ganga of the Republic of Congo created an investment partnership with bid chair Tom Welch which bought and sold real estate in Utah at a significant profit. Ganga and several of his relatives repeatedly visited Utah for medical procedures, with their travel expenses paid by the bid committee.

At the 102nd IOC Session, which coincided with the 1994 Winter Olympics in Lillehammer, Norway, the IOC created stricter rules for the relationships between IOC members and candidate cities. Under these rules, gifts from bidders to IOC members were limited to a maximum value of $50, except during the six months immediately before the vote, when the maximum was raised to $150. Salt Lake City and other candidates flagrantly violated these rules, which the IOC had created no means to enforce. Several IOC members received gifts from Salt Lake City that were valued in the tens of thousands of dollars, in some cases during the Lillehammer meeting that forbade the practice. Beneficiaries of these gifts included IOC president Juan Antonio Samaranch, who received two engraved firearms which he donated to the Olympic Museum. These actions, which were not publicly disclosed until after the 2002 host city selection, later became the focus of the 2002 Winter Olympic bid scandal, which led to the resignations and removals of some IOC members in 1999.

=== Selection process ===
A total of 10 cities bid for the 2002 Winter Olympics, the largest number of candidates up to that point. The IOC decided at its Lillehammer session in February 1994 to narrow down the field to four finalists, before choosing a host city from among those four. The city of Alma-Ata (now Almaty) in Kazakhstan was removed from contention in August 1994 after failing to submit documentation before an IOC deadline. Salt Lake City and the other eight candidates were visited by an Evaluation Commission chaired by future IOC president Thomas Bach. The shortlist was announced at the Olympic Museum in Lausanne, Switzerland, on January 24, 1995. Salt Lake City was selected as a finalist alongside Östersund, Sweden; Quebec City, Canada; and Sion, Switzerland.

Before the shortlist announcement, bid committee president Tom Welch told reporters that if Salt Lake City was not chosen as the host for 2002, "I suspect we would not be a candidate for 2006" and that it would be "time we turn those resources in other directions." However, in the months leading up to the selection, Salt Lake City emerged as a solid favorite among the four candidates. Bid officials told the Salt Lake Tribune that they expected to win, most likely on the second ballot.

The IOC selected the host city for the 2002 Winter Olympics on June 16, 1995, during the 104th IOC Session in Budapest, Hungary. Salt Lake City was chosen by a majority of IOC members on the first ballot, receiving 54 of the 89 available votes. This was the first time that a city had been awarded the Olympic Games on the first ballot since the 1968 Summer Olympics were given to Mexico City, although Los Angeles had been awarded the 1984 Summer Olympics unanimously because it was the only candidate city.

=== Venues ===
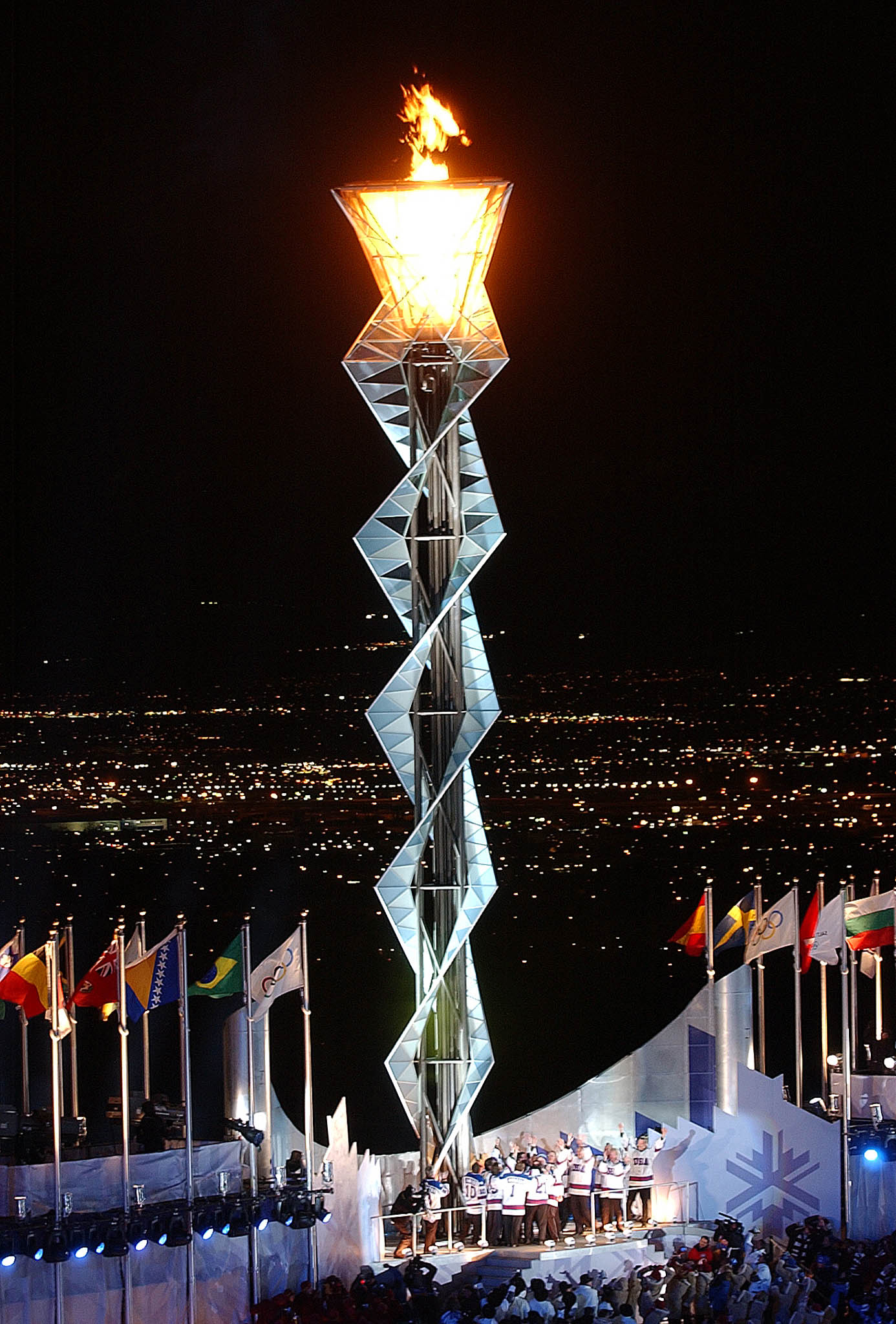
The opening ceremony of the 2002 Winter Olympics

The venues described in Salt Lake City's bid materials were the same as those actually used in the 2002 Winter Olympics, with the following exceptions:

- Biathlon and cross-country skiing would have been held at Mountain Dell.
- Curling would have been held at the Cottonwood Heights Ice Arena.
- Ice hockey men's events would have been held at the Delta Center, while women's events would have been held at the Ogden/Weber Ice Arena.
- Short track speed skating would have been held at the Salt Lake Ice Arena, a purpose-built venue less than 1 km (0.62 mi) from the Olympic Village at the University of Utah.

== 2022 ==
While attending the 2006 Winter Olympics, leaders of the Utah Sports Commission discussed the possibility of a future return to Salt Lake City with IOC members.

During a ceremony at Rice–Eccles Stadium which marked the 10th anniversary of the 2002 Winter Olympics opening ceremony on February 8, 2012, Utah governor Gary Herbert announced that he was creating an exploratory committee to consider a bid for the 2022 Winter Olympics. However, at the time, the U.S. Olympic Committee had a dispute with the IOC over the distribution of sponsorship revenues. The USOC stated that it would not consider submitting a bid to host the Olympics until after the dispute was resolved. An agreement was reached in May 2012, but in July, the USOC announced that it still would not submit a bid for 2022, preferring to focus on 2026. When few other candidates emerged for the 2022 Winter Olympics, USOC chairman Larry Probst said in June 2014 that it was "highly, highly unlikely" that the committee would reconsider its decision not to bid.

== 2026 ==
In October 2017, shortly after the IOC began accepting applications for the 2026 Winter Olympics, an Olympic/Paralympic Exploratory Committee was created by public officials and private businesses in Utah to consider a bid. Since Los Angeles had recently been awarded the 2028 Summer Olympics, it was considered unlikely that an American city would be chosen for 2026. Salt Lake City officials said that they were more interested in bidding for 2030. However, since Los Angeles had bid for the 2024 Summer Olympics and then had been awarded the 2028 Games without a further bid process, the Utah committee believed it was necessary to bid for 2026 in case the IOC was planning to award the 2030 Games in the same way.

A poll by the Salt Lake Tribune found that 83 percent of Utahns supported the bid effort. The exploratory committee prepared a 140-page report which concluded that Salt Lake City could host the Winter Olympics at a lower cost than any other candidate city. On February 7, 2018, Governor Herbert signed a resolution supporting the bid, which had been unanimously approved by the state legislature. The next day, while attending the 2018 Winter Olympics in Pyeongchang, South Korea, USOC chair Larry Probst said that no American bid would be submitted for 2026 before the IOC's deadline of March 31, 2018.

== 2030 and 2034 ==
Bids for the 2034 Winter Olympics and Paralympics
Overview
- XXVII Olympic Winter Games; XVI Paralympic Winter Games
- Winner: Salt Lake City

Details
- Committee: IOC
- Election venue: 142nd IOC Session; Paris

Map of the bidding cities

Important dates
- Decision: 24 July 2024

Decision
- Winner: Salt Lake City (83 votes)
- Runner-up

Salt Lake City shifted its focus to the 2030 Winter Olympics immediately after the USOC ruled out a bid for 2026 in February 2018. The Utah proposal to the USOC faced competition from the Reno–Tahoe area, which withdrew from consideration in November 2018, and Denver. The USOC chose Salt Lake City over Denver as the U.S. candidate city in December.

Salt Lake City, and other places around the world interested in bidding for the 2030 Winter Olympics, were the first to participate in a new bidding process introduced at the 134th IOC Session in Lausanne, Switzerland, in June 2019. Under this procedure, there would be no more host city selection votes. Instead, a Future Host Commission would maintain a "continuous dialogue" with all interested parties, choosing a preferred host when it believed a city was ready, and then submitting that one candidate to be approved or rejected by the full voting body of the IOC.

The Salt Lake City Committee for the Games was formed in February 2020 to pursue a bid for 2030 or 2034. With the 2028 Summer Olympics already planned for Los Angeles, the committee believed that 2030 was too close and preferred to focus on 2034, but continued to participate in the IOC dialogue about both events.

The IOC sent a delegation to Salt Lake City in April 2022 to conduct an inspection and a technical site visit of the competitions, ceremonies and Olympic Village venues. During this time, the IOC considered whether to award the 2030 and 2034 Winter Olympics at the same time, as had been done with the 2024 and 2028 Summer Olympics in 2017. IOC president Thomas Bach opposed such a move, saying that even if there were "good reasons to do it, that for reasons of good governance, it would not be the right thing to do." Hosting duties for the 2030 Winter Olympics were thus set to be awarded at the 141st IOC Session in Mumbai, India, in October 2023. However, IOC members decided that more time was needed to make a decision. Despite Bach's objections, the IOC agreed to choose the hosts for both 2030 and 2034 at its next session, in Paris on the eve of the Summer Olympics in July 2024.

In November 2023, the IOC's Future Host Commission recommended that the 2030 Winter Olympics be held in the French Alps, and the 2034 Games in Salt Lake City. The commission visited Salt Lake City in April 2024 for further examination. The IOC Executive Board approved the commission's findings in June. On July 24, 2024, at the Paris session, IOC members voted on the Salt Lake City proposal. 83 of the 95 voting members approved the measure, with six opposed and another six abstaining. Salt Lake City thus became the host of the 2034 Winter Olympics.

== See also ==
- United States bids for the Olympic Games
- Los Angeles bids for the Summer Olympics
- Detroit bids for the Summer Olympics
- Lake Placid bids for the Winter Olympics
- Anchorage bids for the Winter Olympics
- Sports in Utah
