= Washington Square Park (Salt Lake City) =

Public park in Salt Lake City, Utah, U.S.

Washington Square
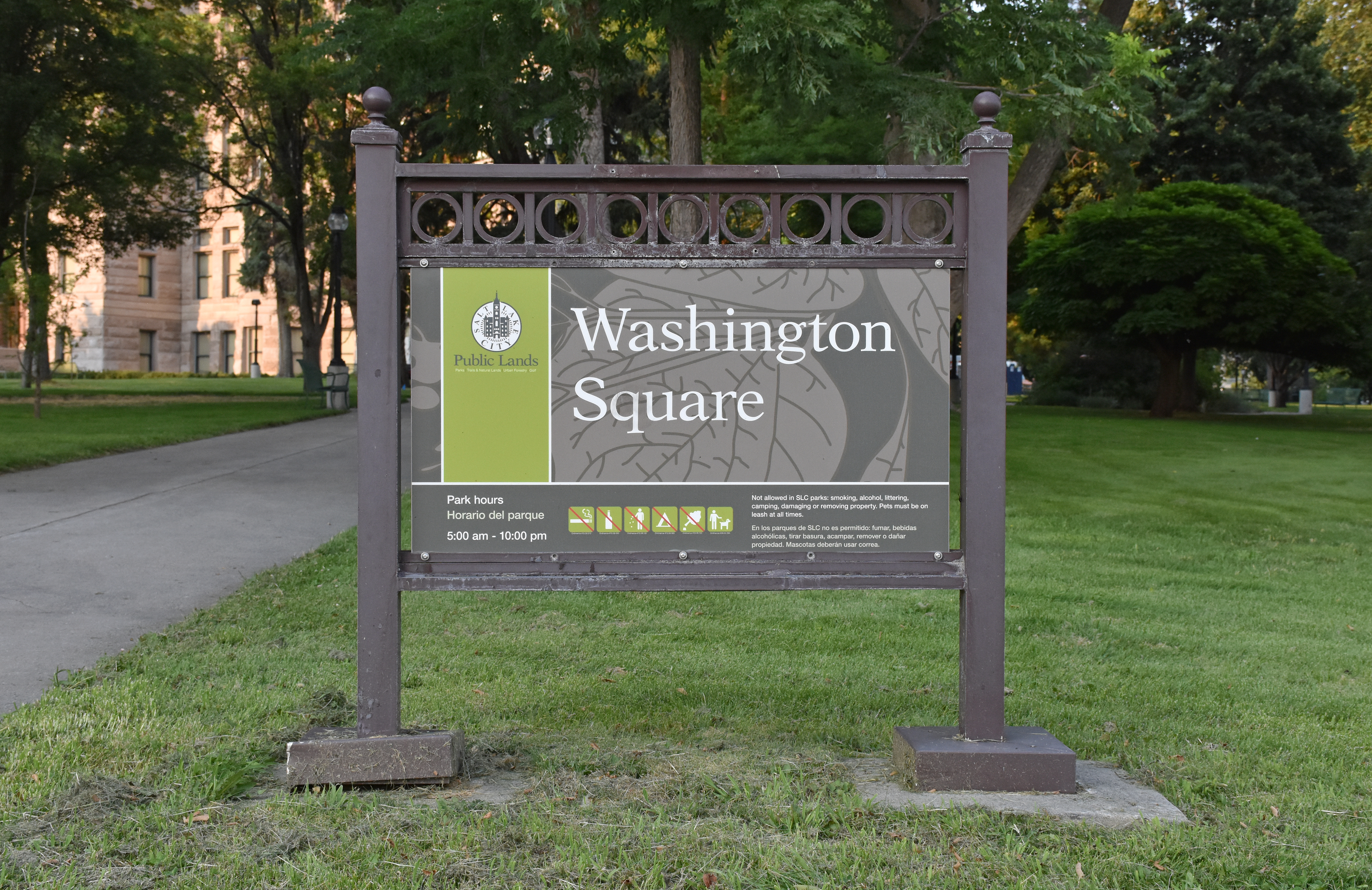
- Washington Square entrance sign
- Interactive map of Washington Square
- Type: Urban park
- Location: Salt Lake City, Utah; United States
- Coordinates: 40°45′36″N 111°53′13″W
- Area: 10 acres (4.0 ha)
- Operator: Salt Lake City Parks Division

Washington Square, or Washington Square Park, is a public park in Salt Lake City, Utah, United States. The park surrounds the Salt Lake City and County Building, which houses Salt Lake City's government.

The block containing the park was designated a public square in the initial 1847 survey of Salt Lake City. Early on it was used as a campground for newly arrived Mormon pioneers, and wagon trains headed to other areas of the Western United States. Later it hosted a skating pond, circuses, markets, and sports fields. In the 1890s, the Salt Lake City and County Building was constructed in the center of the block. Currently, several of the city's cultural celebrations and events are centered around the square.

== Description ==
Washington Square includes the entire city block that is bounded on the north by 400 South (University Boulevard/Utah State Route 186), on the east by 200 East, on the south by 500 South (Cesar E. Chavez Boulevard), and on the west by State Street (U.S. Route 89).

Like other blocks in Salt Lake City's original grid, Washington Square is 10 acres (4.0 ha). The Salt Lake City and County Building, alone in the center of the block, takes up relatively little space. Trees, walkways, and statues surround the building, creating the current park.

Several of Salt Lake City's cultural events take place at Washington Square, and often 200 East Street between it and Library Square is blocked off to create one large event plaza. To protect the lawn and trees, the large celebrations are, as of 2019, limited to four a year (including the Living Traditions Festival, Utah Arts Festival, Utah Pride Festival, and Days of '47 Pioneer Celebration).

== History ==
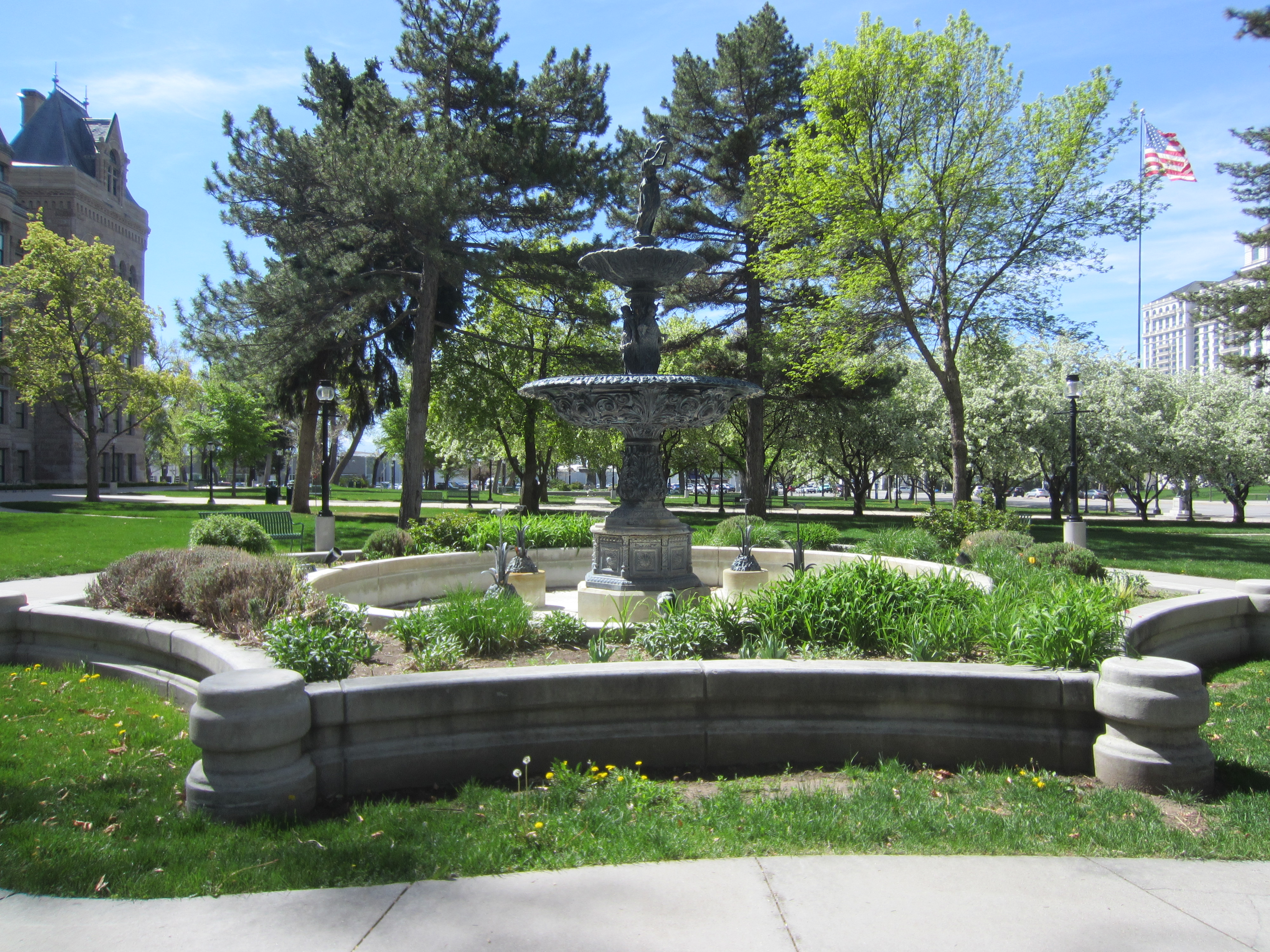
Fountain in Washington Square, April 2021

On August 2, 1847, just weeks after the first Mormon settlers arrived in the Salt Lake Valley, Henry Sherwood and Orson Pratt began to survey and layout Salt Lake City, beginning at the newly established Salt Lake meridian. In the survey, four blocks were designated public squares, including block 38, which would later be known as Washington Square. (The other public squares in the early surveys became Pioneer Park, Union Square, and Tenth Ward Square (currently the site of Trolley Square).)

Early names for the square included Eighth Ward Square, Emigration Square, and Washington Square. From about 1859 until the mid 1860s, the square served as the campground for newly arrived Mormon pioneers. Other emigrants passing through the city on their way to areas further west, such as California, also made use of the grounds. On July 23, 1947, the Daughters of Utah Pioneers (DUP) dedicated a monument in the square to commemorate its usage as a pioneer campground. The DUP monument erroneously claims the first group of Mormon pioneers who arrived in July 1847 camped at the square. Rather, this group spent their first night in the valley near First Encampment Park, and the following day traveled to the site of the future downtown Salt Lake City, where they camped for a few nights near 300 South and State Street, before constructing a fort at the site of Pioneer Park.

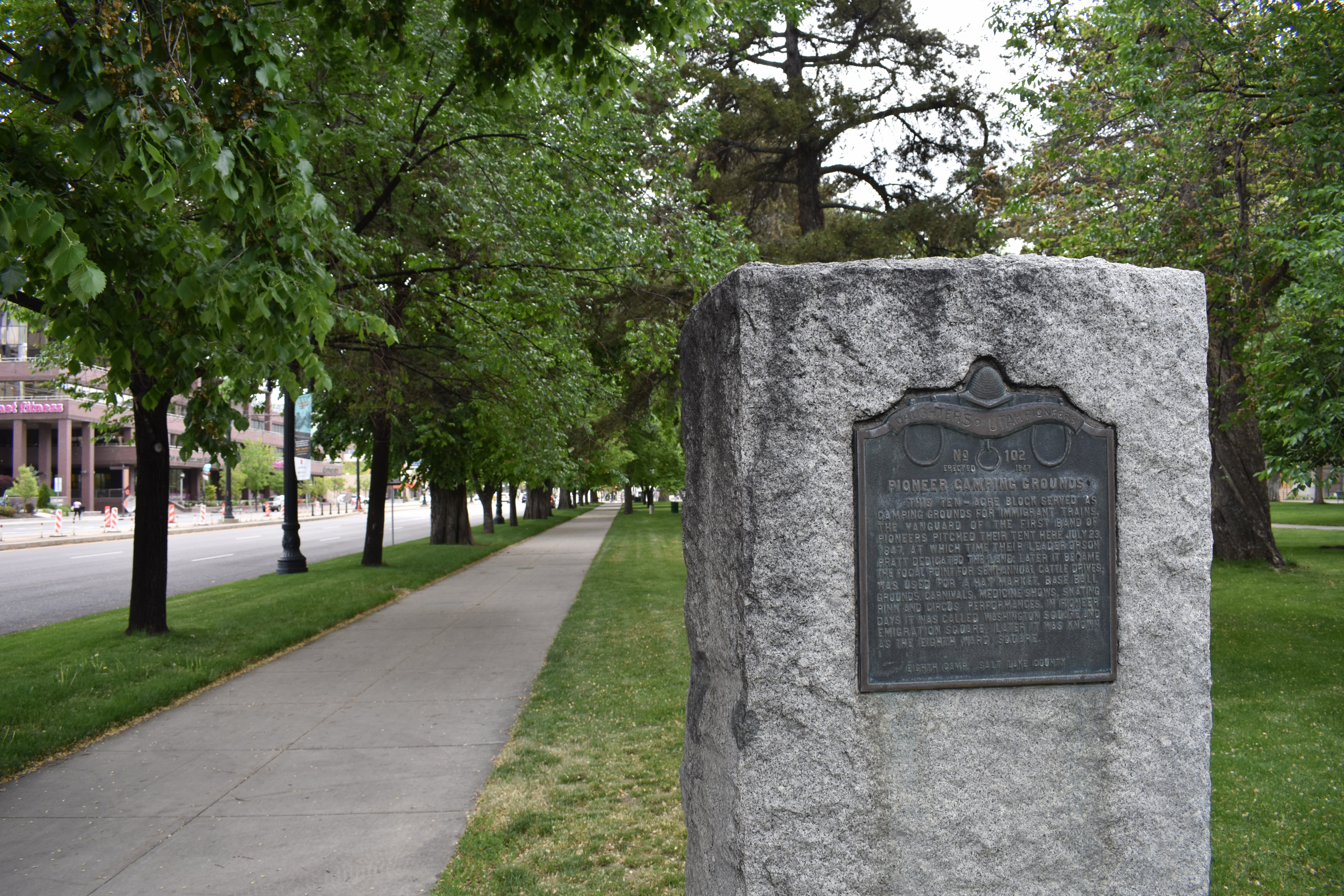
DUP monument commemorating the square's usage as a pioneer campground

Later the square became the site of a skating pond, was used as circus grounds, hosted a marketplace for hay, and for a time included a baseball park. Then finally, in the 1890s, the City and County Building was constructed in the center of the block.

On February 21, 1957 the Salt Lake City Commission passed a resolution officially naming the grounds "Washington Square" in honor of one of its older names (which had been used in honor of US President George Washington). Some sources indicate the block had been named "Washington Square" on December 12, 1865 by the Salt Lake City Council, and simply needed reconfirmation in 1957.

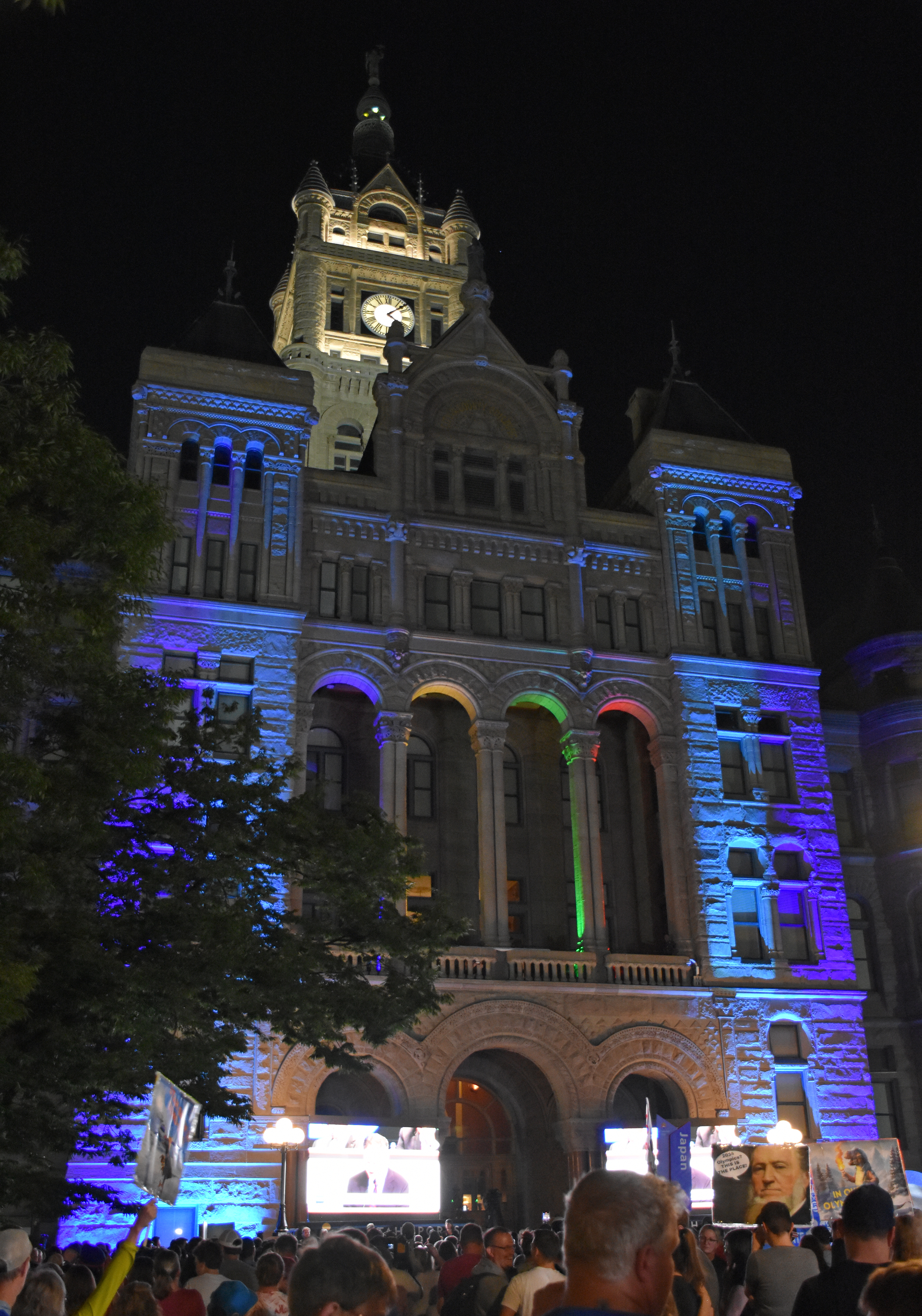
Crowds gather in Washington Square to witness the announcement of the 2034 Winter Olympics host

One notable gathering in the park happened on June 16, 1995, when 40,000–50,000 people congregated on the west side of the City and County Building to watch, live on a large screen, the International Olympic Committee (IOC) announce the bid winner to host the 2002 Winter Olympics. When IOC chairman Juan Antonio Samaranch read the winning city—Salt Lake City—the crowd at Washington Square cheered loudly for minutes, drowning out the rest of Samaranch's words. As part of the 2002 Olympic torch relay, a special cauldron was set up on the square, which was lit by Paralympic athlete Chris Waddell during a celebration in front of the City and County Building on February 7, 2002. The square was also the site of concerts and other entertainment during the games.

A similar event occurred on July 24, 2024, when thousands gathered on the east side of Washington Square for a "Celebrate 2034" party, to watch coverage from Paris of the bid announcement for the 2034 Winter Olympics.

== See also ==
- Black Lives Matter street mural (Salt Lake City)
