= Lillehammer bid for the 1992 Winter Olympics =

Norwegian unsuccessful Olympic bid

Bids for the 1992 Winter Olympics and Paralympics
Overview
- XVI Olympic Winter Games; V Paralympic Winter Games
- Winner: Albertville; Runner-up: Sofia; Shortlist: Falun · Lillehammer · Cortina d'Ampezzo · Anchorage

Details
- City: Lillehammer, Norway
- Chair: Ole Sjetne
- NOC: Norwegian Olympic Committee

Previous Games hosted
- None

Decision
- Result: 3rd runner-up (11 votes)

The Lillehammer bid for the 1992 Winter Olympics and Paralympics was an unsuccessful campaign launched in 1984. It bid ended fourth of seven at the 91st IOC Session on 17 September 1986, who awarded the 1992 Winter Olympics to Albertville, France. The defeat resulted in a replanned bid for the 1994 Winter Olympics, which was won by the city.

== History ==
Planning of a Norwegian bid started in 1983, after Juan Antonio Samaranch suggested an Oslo Olympic bid during the successfully staged FIS Nordic World Ski Championships 1982 and a Swedish bid with Falun and Östersund for the 1988 Winter Olympics had failed.

A few months earlier already the choice of Lillehammer was proposed by Arne B. Mollén, chairmen of the Norwegian Olympic Committee, immediately after the Swedish failure, stating that Lillehammer was the only Nordic town capable of hosting the event. German IOC member Wolfgang Müller when know the idea immediately contacted Mollén, and they held a meeting on 12 October 1981, where it was agreed that the planning would not yet be launched to the public. The inland districts of Oppland and Hedmark had been experiencing an economic slump, and on 21 August 1981, the Government of Norway had appointed a government committee, led by the politician Odvar Nordli, to look into ways to stimulate the local economy. The committee was presented the plans, and concluded that it would be a suitable way to stimulate the region economy.

In a secret meeting with the Lillehammer Executive Council on 22 January 1982, they were informed about the plans, and they decided to create a committee, led by Ole Sjetne, to plan the games. A petition was started in 1982 to stop the town from hosting the games, which gathered about a thousand signatures by 2 June 1982, when the municipal council was to evaluate the planning. The opposition created The Committee For Information About the Olympics in Lillehammer 1992. The municipal committee published a report on 28 January 1983, presenting a draft of the Olympic bidding plans. On 2 June 1983, Lillehammer Municipal Council voted with 42 against 13 to actively support and work for bringing the games to Lillehammer. The Labour Party was split, and both sides promised demonstrations and actions.

On 1 October 1983, the limited company Lillehammer-OL 1992 AS was established to make the plans. Its director was Arild Sletten and its chair was Ole Sjetne. Financing for the planning was secured through NOK 15 million from the private sector and NOK 10 million from the public sector. During the 1984 Winter Olympics, held in Sarajevo a public reception was held where Lillehammer's bidding for the 1992 Winter Olympics was launched. A major focus for the committee was to distribute information about Norway and very unknown Lillehammer among IOC members. This action led the visits to the 70 IOC members in their home countries, with the Norwegian Ministry of Foreign Affairs following up. Representatives attended 37 international sports events. During 1985, a government guarantee was secured, establishing the games' financial foundation. The Information Committee published a white book in 1984, which was critical to both the application process and the impact of the games on the town, warning that the city would change character. Arne Skouen stated that "[t]he best way to bulldoze over and leave the city behind looking like a battlefield is to organize an Olympics."

In May 1985, Petter Rønningen took over as director of the company, by which time it had five full-time employees. The final plans were approved by the municipal council on 7 November. The formal bid was three volumes totaling 500-page, presented in English and French. The bid sent a delegation of 58 delegates to the IOC session, which was held in Lausanne, Switzerland on 17 September 1986.

== Outcome ==
1992 Winter Olympics bidding results
City	Country	Round 1	Round 2	Round 3	Round 4	Round 5 (Run-off)	Round 6
Albertville	France	19	26	29	42	—	51
Sofia	Bulgaria	25	25	28	24	—	25
Falun	Sweden	10	11	11	11	41	9
Lillehammer	Norway	10	11	9	11	40	—
Cortina d'Ampezzo	Italy	7	6	7	—	—	—
Anchorage	United States	7	5	—	—	—	—
Berchtesgaden	West Germany	6	—	—	—	—	—
