= Stockholm bid for the 2022 Winter Olympics =

Bids for the 2022 Winter Olympics and Paralympics
Overview
- XXIV Olympic Winter Games; XIII Paralympic Winter Games

Details
- City: Stockholm/Åre, Sweden
- NOC: Swedish Olympic Committee (SOK)

Previous Games hosted
- Hosted the 1912 Summer Olympics

Stockholm 2022 was a bid by Stockholm with Åre and the Swedish Olympic Committee for the 2022 Winter Olympics. The bid was announced on November 11, 2013. The IOC was to select the host city for the 2022 Winter Olympics at the 127th IOC Session in Kuala Lumpur, Malaysia on July 31, 2015. Stockholm previously hosted the 1912 Summer Olympics and hosted equestrian events at the 1956 Summer Olympics in Melbourne.

On 17 January 2014, the Moderate Party in Stockholm decided not to support the bid, and after that there was a clear majority in the city council against organising the games.

On 17 January 2014, Stockholm dropped its bid for 2022 Winter Olympics.

== History ==
Venue areas

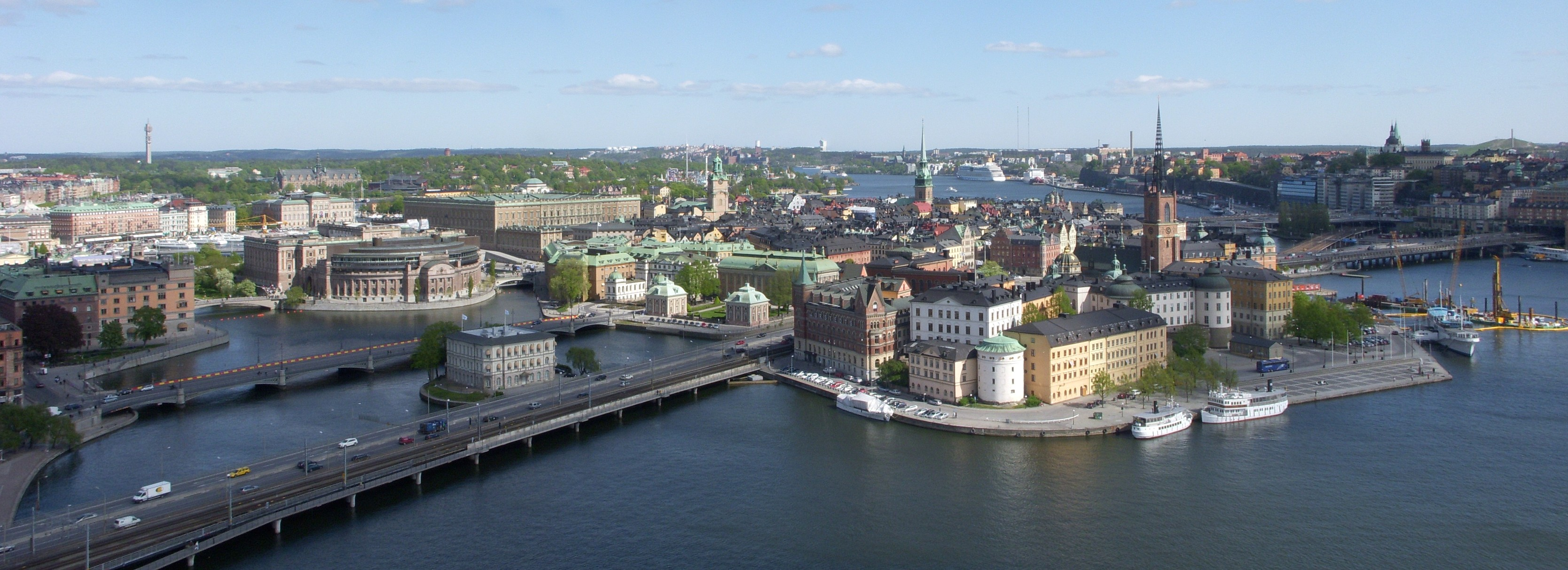
Stockholm City Centre

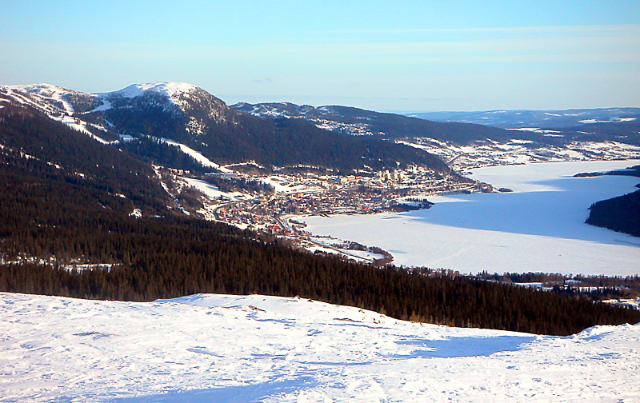
Åre

In summer 2013, the Swedish Olympic Committee (SOK) has expressed plans to submit an application for the 2022 Winter Olympics and the 2022 Winter Paralympics in the capital Stockholm. Four alpine skiing events will be held in Åre in northern Sweden. SOK has the support of the Swedish Sports Organization for the Disabled and Swedish Paralympic Committee and the Swedish Sports Confederation. Some people has expressed that the distance between Stockholm and Åre is too far, about 610 km (380 mi). Åre has three times before applied for the games together with nearby city of Östersund, but have been turned down all times. Östersund was also interested in a potential 2022 bid, but the Swedish Olympic Committee decided not to move forward with bidding due to a lack of financial guarantees from the government. Östersund is probably also too small to host the Olympic Games. Lena Adelsohn Liljeroth, Minister for Culture and Sports, has said that she finds it difficult to see a future Olympic games in Sweden. The president of the Swedish Olympic Committee Stefan Lindeberg thinks that Stockholm's size is perfect for the Winter Olympics and says the city already has the most of what is needed. According to calculations, a Swedish Olympic Games will costs approximately 15–20 billion SEK (€ 1.7–2.3 billion).

On October 1, 2013, investigator Jöran Hägglund indicated that it is entirely possible to host the Winter Olympics in Stockholm. Hägglund estimated the implementation budget to 9.79 billion SEK (€ 1.13 billion) and the investment budget to 2.5 billion SEK (€ 290 million). The games will be concentrated entirely in the Stockholm area, and only eight of the alpine events are planned to be held in Åre. He also said that five investments are necessary; a new track to bobsleigh, luge and skeleton, improve the vertical drop fairly much in Flottsbrobacken, a new ski jump, speed skating venue and a cross country venue. The infrastructure and other ice venues already exists in Stockholm. The reason for this cost cut is that the Swedish government does not want to support the games with big money (several 100 million euros). However the IOC requires the government to guarantee support for cost overruns etc. A more thorough investigation showed that the cost estimation was uncertain. IOC requirements would demand reconstruction of several existing arenas, adding VIP lounges for IOC members and separate ones for media, restaurant kitchens etc.

== Previous bids ==
Stockholm hosted the 1912 Summer Olympics. Stockholm also hosted the Equestrian events in the 1956 Summer Olympics.

Stockholm bid to host the 2004 Summer Olympics but lost to Athens.

=== Previous bids by other Swedish cities ===
Gothenburg (with cities spread over Sweden) bid to host the 1984 Winter Olympics but lost to Sarajevo. Falun (with Åre) bid to host the 1988 and 1992 Winter Olympics but lost to Calgary and Albertville respectively.

Östersund bid to host the 1994, 1998 and 2002 Winter Olympics but lost to Lillehammer, Nagano and Salt Lake City respectively.

== Future bids ==
Stockholm co-bidded for the 2026 with Åre, but lost out to Milan-Cortina d'Ampezzo, Italy.

== Venues ==
List of proposed venues:

=== Competition venues ===
| Venue | Status | Capacity | Sport(s). |
Stockholm City Zone
| Tele2 Arena | Existing | 15,000 | Figure skating |
| Tele2 Arena | Existing | 15,000 | Short track speed skating |
| Ericsson Globe | Existing | 14,000 | Ice hockey |
| Hovet | Existing, work required | 9,000 | Ice hockey |
| Stockholm Olympic Stadium | Existing | 15,000 | Freestyle skiing (aerials) |
| Östermalms IP | Existing, work required | 6,000 | Speed skating |
| Hammarby Ski Arena | Temporary | 10,000 | Freestyle skiing (moguls, halfpipe) |
| Hammarby Ski Arena | Temporary | 10,000 | Snowboarding (halfpipe) |
| Hammarby Sliding Centre | Additional | 10,000 | Bobsleigh |
| Hammarby Sliding Centre | Additional | 10,000 | Luge/skeleton |
| Flottsbro Ski Arena | Temporary | 14,000 | Freestyle skiing (ski cross, slopestyle) |
| Flottsbro Ski Arena | Temporary | 14,000 | Snowboarding (snowboard cross, parallel slalom, slope style) |
| Tullinge Nordic Centre | Additional | 15,000 | Biathlon |
| Tullinge Nordic Centre | Temporary | 13,000 | Cross country skiing |
| Tullinge Nordic Centre | Temporary | 13,000 | Ski jumping |
| Tallkrogen Bandy Hall | Planned | 3,000 | Curling |
Åre Alpine Venue
| Åre National Ski Resort | Existing | 11,500 | Alpine skiing |

=== Non-sporting venues ===
| Venue | Status | Capacity | Use |
Stockholm City Zone
| Friends Arena | Existing | 50,000 seats | Opening and closing ceremonies |
| Årstafältet | Planned | 5,450 beds | Olympic village |
| Stockholm International Fairs | Existing | 10,000 media representatives | International Broadcasting Centre |
| Slottsbacken | Existing | 10,000 | Medal Plaza |
Åre Alpine Venue
| Åre Snow Village | Planned | 650 beds | Olympic village |

== Transportation ==
Stockholm is served by the Stockholm-Arlanda Airport, which has intercontinental flights. The distance between Stockholm and Åre is about 610 km (380 mi). There will be air connections to Åre Östersund Airport around 90 km from Åre. There are suggestions to use an airfield at Järpen (25 km (16 mi) from Åre), which probably must be upgraded to be used for commercial passenger flights. Groups in large planes going to Åre will probably use the Trondheim Airport in Norway (130 km (81 mi) from Åre). There are train connections between Stockholm and Åre, needing around 6 hours.
