= Bids for the 1998 Winter Olympics =

Overview
- XVIII Olympic Winter Games
- Winner: Nagano; Runner-up: Salt Lake City; Shortlist: Östersund · Jaca · Aosta

Details
- Committee: IOC
- Election venue: 97th IOC Session; Birmingham, United Kingdom

Map of the bidding cities

Important dates
- Decision: 15 June 1991

Decision
- Winner: Nagano (46 votes)
- Runner-up: Salt Lake City (42 votes)

The selection process for the 1998 Winter Olympics consisted of five bids, and saw Nagano, Japan, be selected ahead of Salt Lake City, Utah, United States; Östersund, Sweden; Jaca, Spain; and Aosta, Italy. The selection was made at the 97th IOC Session in Birmingham, United Kingdom, on 15 June 1991.

The Nagano Olympic bid committee spent approximately $14 million to entertain the 62 International Olympic Committee members and many of their companions. The precise figures are unknown since Nagano, after the IOC asked that the entertainment expenditures not be made public, destroyed the financial records, according to bid committee member Junichi Yamaguchi.

== Proposed dates ==
Nagano	7 - 22 February
Salt Lake City	7 - 22 February
Östersund	21 February - 8 March
Jaca	21 February - 8 March
Aosta	7 - 22 February

== Results ==
IOC voting
City	Country (NOC)	Round 1	Round 2	Round 3	Round 4	Round 5
Nagano	Japan	21	—	30	36	46
Salt Lake City	United States	15	59	27	29	42
Östersund	Sweden	18	—	25	23	—
Jaca	Spain	19	—	5	—	—
Aosta	Italy	15	29	—	—	—
