= Bids for the 2034 Winter Olympics =

Bids for the 2034 Winter Olympics and Paralympics
Overview
- XXVII Olympic Winter Games; XVI Paralympic Winter Games
- Winner: Salt Lake City

Details
- Committee: IOC
- Election venue: 142nd IOC Session; Paris

Map of the bidding cities

Important dates
- Decision: 24 July 2024

Decision
- Winner: Salt Lake City (83 votes)
- Runner-up

The selection of the host for the 2034 Winter Olympics saw a new process being introduced from 2019. The bidding process saw the Salt Lake City and the state of Utah in the United States, chosen as the preferred and expected host that was officially certified by the IOC before the 2024 Summer Olympics on 24 July 2024 in Paris, France.

== Bidding process ==
The new IOC bidding process was approved at the 134th IOC Session on 24 June 2019 in Lausanne, Switzerland. The key proposals, driven by the relevant recommendations from Olympic Agenda 2020, are:

- Establish a permanent, ongoing dialogue to explore and create interest among cities/regions/countries and National Olympic Committees for any Olympic event
- Create two Future Host Commissions (Summer and Winter Games) to oversee interest in future Olympic events and report to the IOC executive board
- Give the IOC Session more influence by having non-executive board members form part of the Future Host Commissions.

The IOC also modified the Olympic Charter to increase its flexibility by removing the date of election from 7 years before the games, and changing the host from a single city/region/country to multiple cities, regions, or countries.

=== Future host winter commissions ===
The full composition of the Winter Commissions, overseeing interested hosts or with potential hosts where the IOC may want to create interest, is as follows:

Future Host Winter Commissions for 2034 Winter Olympics
IOC members (4)	Other members (4)
(Romania) Octavian Morariu (chair); (Sweden) Gunilla Lindberg; (Austria) Karl Stoss; (Afghanistan) Samira Asghari	(China) Zhang Hong (Athletes); (Latvia) Einars Fogelis (AIOWF); (Chile) Neven Ilic (NOCs); (Netherlands) Rita van Driel (IPC member)

=== Dialogue stages ===
According to the Future Host Commission's rules of conduct, the new IOC bidding system is divided into 2 dialogue stages:

==== Continuous dialogue ====
Non-committal discussions between the IOC and interested parties (City/Region/Country/NOC interested in hosting) with regard to hosting future Olympic events.

During the Olympic Summit on 9 December 2022 the IOC informed to remain in "Continuous Dialogue" with several well-developed projects by parties that have expressed interest in the Olympic Winter Games 2030 and with whom intense collaboration is ongoing. The Summit was also informed that the commission is looking into challenges and opportunities facing future Olympic Winter Games, such as the impact of climate change. A number of proposals which could have an impact on future elections were discussed, including rotation of the Games within a certain pool of hosts, minimum climate conditions and existing infrastructure criteria.

Upon the request of the commission, the IOC Executive Board decided to give the Commission more time to study all these factors to make the best possible decisions about future hosting, including a revised 2030 election timeframe.

==== Targeted dialogue ====
Targeted discussions with one or more interested parties (called preferred host(s)), as instructed by the IOC Executive Board. This follows a recommendation by the Future Host Commission as a result of continuous dialogue.

Following a recommendation by the International Olympic Committee (IOC)'s Future Host Commission for the Olympic Winter Games, the IOC Executive Board (EB) on 29 November 2023 invited the United States Olympic & Paralympic Committee (USOPC) into "Targeted Dialogue" towards hosting the Olympic and Paralympic Winter Games 2034 in Salt Lake City.

=== Host selection ===
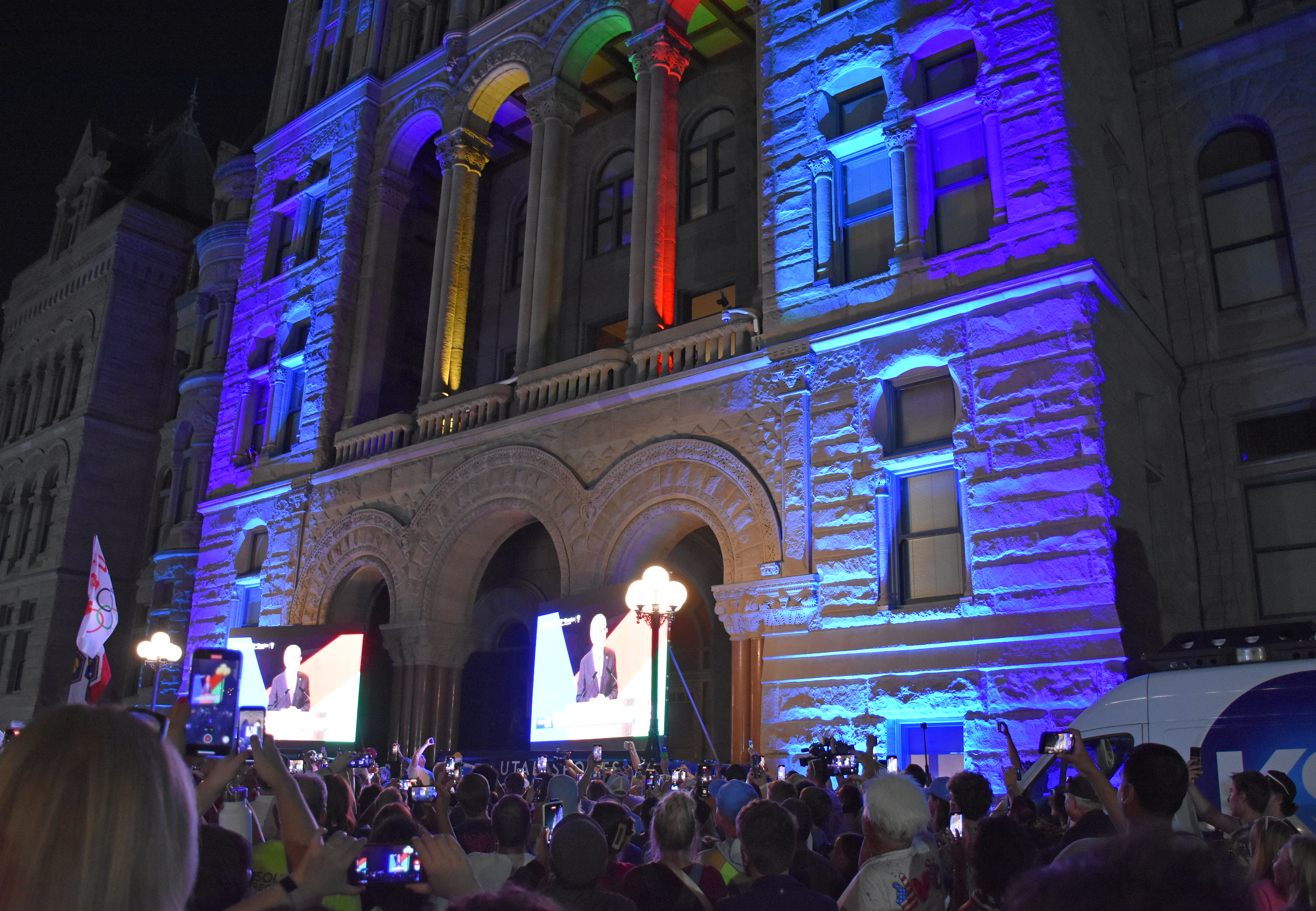
The crowd at Salt Lake City's Washington Square watches the IOC's announcement.

Salt Lake City was confirmed as host of the 2034 Winter Olympics at the 142nd IOC Session on 24 July 2024 in Paris, France. As per the new format of choosing future Olympic Games host cities from the IOC's Agenda 2020, the vote was in a form of a referendum to the 95 IOC delegates.

2034 Winter Olympics host city election
City	NOC name	Yes	No	Abs
Salt Lake City	United States	83	6	6

== Bidding parties ==
=== Stakeholders ===
Stakeholders are those cities or regions that have expressed potential interest in hosting the Games.

City	Country	National Olympic Committee
Salt Lake City, Utah	United States	United States Olympic & Paralympic Committee (USOPC)
Site of the 2002 Winter Olympics, the 2002 Winter Paralympics and the 2007 Winter Deaflympics. The bid relies on existing infrastructure and private funding. Salt Lake City officially began the process of attempting to host another Winter Olympics when an exploratory committee was established in February 2012, the 10-year anniversary of the 2002 Games. In December 2018, the U.S. Olympic & Paralympic Committee named Salt Lake City as U.S. choice for a future Olympic and Paralympic Winter Games bid. The Salt Lake City Committee for the Games was formed in February 2020 to pursue a bid for 2030 or 2034. The committee bolstered its engagement with athletes in governance in June 2021, naming four-time Olympic speed skater Catherine Raney-Norman as its chair. In February 2020, following the announcement of Sapporo's bid for the 2030 Games, Salt Lake City's organizing committee began to shift their bid focus towards the 2034 Games, in part due to possible financial sponsorship conflicts with the 2028 Summer Olympics in Los Angeles. At the first meeting in June 2021, the organizing committee considered whether it should change the bid for 2030 or 2034. President and chief executive of the Salt Lake City bid committee Fraser Bullock mentioned that the small window between the Los Angeles 2028 and a potential Salt Lake City 2030 Games could be a real difficulty to manage. The IOC sent a delegation to Salt Lake City, from 27 to 29 April 2022, to conduct an inspection and a technical site visit of the competitions, ceremonies and Olympic Village venues. Bullock confirmed at a meeting on 1 November 2022 that "SLC considers the upcoming process is focused on 2030 and SLC will fully participate in that process to hopefully get either the 2030 or 2034 Olympics". In November 2023, the IOC listed Salt Lake City as a preferred host for the 2034 Winter Olympic Games. The IOC's Future Host Commission visited Salt Lake City in April 2024, and after reviewing their findings, the IOC Executive Board advanced Salt Lake City's bid to the final stage in June 2024.

== Potential bids ==
- Munich, Germany

In December 2022, the German Olympic Sports Confederation announced they would explore a bid for Munich to host the 2034 Winter Olympics and the 2036 Summer Olympics (although for the latter, Berlin would eventually be preferred for the German bid). If this bid was successful, this would be the second time an Olympic event would be held in Munich, with the city previously hosting the 1972 Summer Olympics. Munich previously bid for the 2018 Winter Olympics, losing to Pyeongchang.

- Carinthia, Austria, Friuli-Venezia Giulia, Italy and Slovenia

On 19 February 2023, Peter Kaiser, the governor of Carinthia, announced that plans for a joined bid by the Austrian state of Carinthia, alongside Italian Region Friuli-Venezia Giulia and Slovenia. A similar bid had been proposed for the 2006 Winter Olympics, eventually losing to Turin. The preparations for the bid were later confirmed by the Slovenian minister of sports, Matjaž Han. On 25 March, Italian politician and head of the Friuli-Venezia Giulia Region, Massimiliano Fedriga confirmed these plans. On 11 April 2024, Peter Kaiser announced that a joint bid would be prepared for the 2028 Winter Youth Olympics. If selected, these Winter Youth Olympics would work as a test for an eventual hosting of the Winter Olympics.

== Developments ==
=== Bid details ===
Bid Party	Country	National Olympic Committee	Bid Committee Website	Status	Main article
Salt Lake City	United States	U.S. Olympic Committee (USOPC)	https://slc-ut2034.org/	Stakeholders	
