= Östersund bid for the 2002 Winter Olympics =

Bids for the 2002 Winter Olympics and Paralympics
Overview
- XIX Olympic Winter Games; VIII Paralympic Winter Games
- Winner: Salt Lake City; Runner-up: Sion; Shortlist: Quebec City

Details
- City: Östersund, Sweden
- NOC: Swedish Olympic Committee (SWE)

Previous Games hosted
- None, previously bid for 1994 and 1998 Winter Games

Decision
- Result: shortlisted

Östersund 2002 (Southern Sami: Staare 2002) was an unsuccessful bid by Östersund, Sweden, and the Swedish Olympic Committee to host the 2002 Winter Olympics. The city bid for the third consecutive time, and it was the sixth time that Sweden had submitted a bid.

== Venues ==
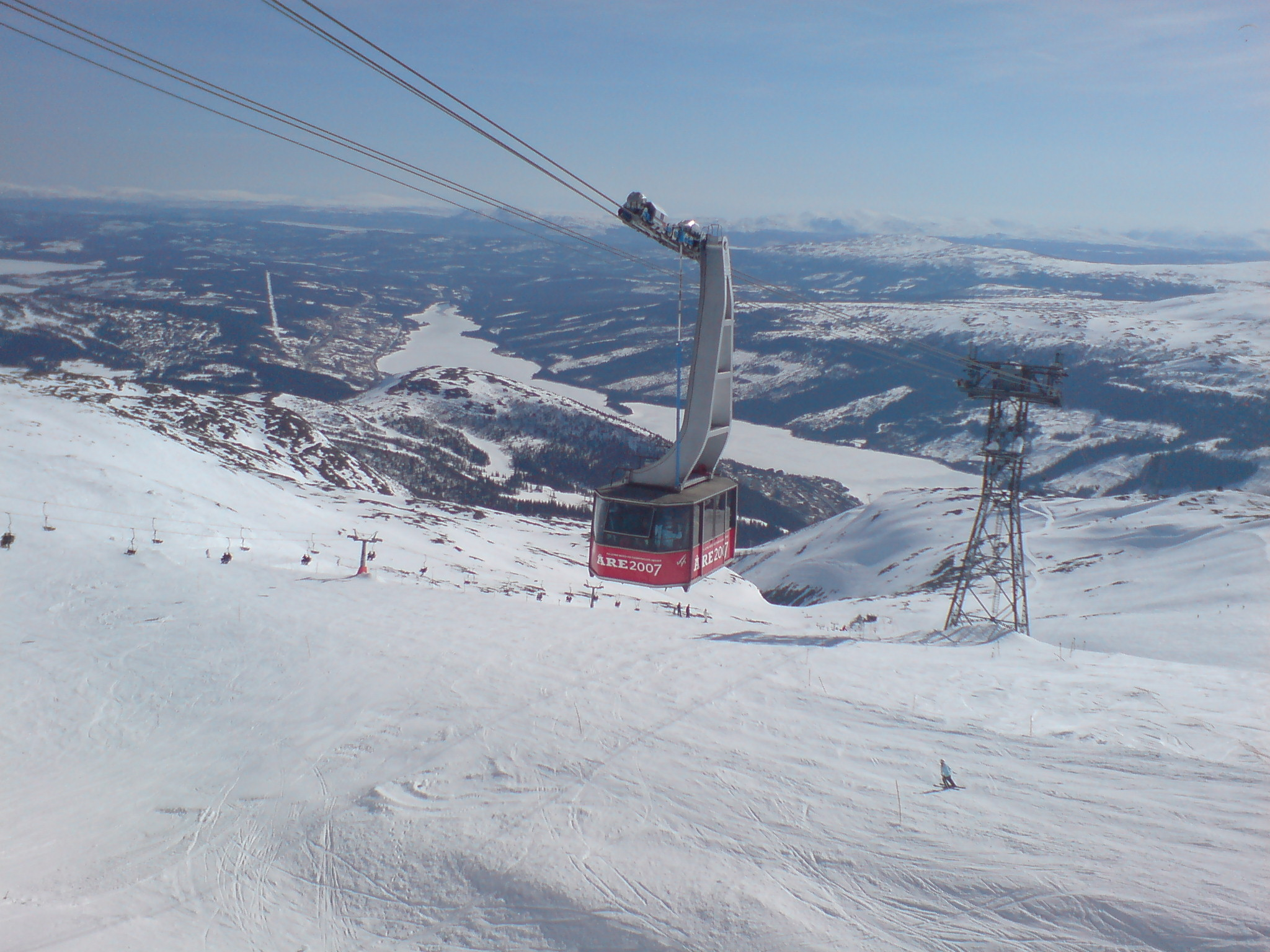
Åre Ski Area, planned for alpine skiing

The proposed venues concept comprised two main areas:

=== Östersund ===
- ceremonies
- biathlon (Remonthagen),
- ski jumping, Nordic combined, sliding sports (Östberget)
- cross-country skiing
- men's ice hockey, figure skating, short-track speed skating (Sportfältet)
- speed skating (Lövsta)

=== Åre ===
- alpine skiing (Åre Ski Area)
- freestyle skiing
- snowboard
- curling, women's ice hockey (Åre Hallen)

== Bid's evaluation ==
The IOC evaluation report praised the support by both Swedish government and the Östersund residents (the poll showed 70% support). The overall games and transport concept were considered excellent, as many venues were already homologated by the FIS, and the competitions would have been staged in two main zones one an hour by road from the other, or just 40 minutes by train. The airport is located just 15 minutes away. Other issues rated favorably were: a single Olympic Village which would form part of an urban development project on the lakeside, excellent facilities planned for the media, and US$780 million budget guaranteed by the Swedish government.

However, the evaluation report listed some problems that might have occurred. The ski jumps were planned to be constructed, but the amount of space reserved for seating would have to be reviewed, as the commission deemed it inadequate to cope with 40,000 spectators. Environmental impact assessment had not been carried out for several sport venues and the site chosen for bob and luge track was in a residential area, which might have caused problems with access and spectator capacity.

== Aftermath ==
During the 104th IOC meeting held in Budapest the bid got 14 votes and lost in the first round to Salt Lake City.
