= Quebec City bid for the 2002 Winter Olympics =

Bids for the 2002 Winter Olympics and Paralympics
Overview
- XIX Olympic Winter Games; VIII Paralympic Winter Games
- Winner: Salt Lake City; Runner-up: Sion; Shortlist: Ostersund

Details
- City: Quebec, Canada
- NOC: Canadian Olympic Committee (CAN)

Previous Games hosted
- None, but the PEPS Laval University in Quebec City host handball event during 1976 Summer Olympic , Canada had hosted the 1988 Olympic Winter Games in Calgary

Decision
- Result: shortlisted

Quebec 2002 was an unsuccessful bid by Quebec City, Canada, and the Canadian Olympic Committee to host the 2002 Winter Olympics. This was the city's first time to bid. Canada had previously hosted the 1988 Olympic Winter Games in Calgary, Alberta and would go on to successfully bid and host the 2010 Olympic Winter Games in Vancouver.

== Venues ==
The proposed venues concept would be based in Quebec City:

== Non-competition venues ==
- Ceremonies (Temporary amphitheater at the Plains of Abraham)
- EXPOCité – International Broadcast Center
- Quebec Convention Centre – Main Press Center
- Laval University – Athletes' Village

== Existing venues ==
- Colisée de Québec – Ice Hockey I (Men)
- Youth Pavilion – Figure Skating and Short Track Speed Skating
- Gaétan Boucher Speed Skating Oval – Speed Skating
- Saint-Romuald Arena – Curling
- PEPS Arena, University of Laval – Ice Hockey II (Women)
- CFB Valcartier – Biathlon
- Le Massif – Alpine Skiing (Women's Downhill, Combined and Super G)
- Stoneham – Alpine Skiing (Men's and Women's Slalom)
- Mont Ste-Anne – Alpine Skiing (Men's Giant Slalom), Cross Country Skiing and Nordic Combined
- Le Relais – Freestyle Skiing

== New venues ==
- Cap du Salut or Acropoles des Draveurs– Alpine Skiing (Men's Downhill and Combination)
- Stoneham (Mont-Hibou)– Nordic Combined, Ski Jumping and Sliding Events (Bobsleigh and Luge)

== Bid's evaluation ==
The IOC evaluation report praised the bid, stating that it was considered the strongest of all the bidding cities. However, reservations were made by the International Ski Federation with regards to the proposed Men's Downhill venue, as a ramp would have been necessary to accommodate the necessary 800 meter vertical drop, whilst barges would be placed along the river St. Lawrence. in order to accommodate a finishing area. An alternative site located inland at Acropole des Draveurs, would have provided the 800 meter vertical, but the site would have required major development. Some locals and government officials flagged the 25 million dollar temporary venue as rather pointless and despite the proposal incorporating a tunnel for a train line which runs along the mountain range.

Other proposals, such as staging the Men's Downhill events in Calgary were also considered, but deemed unrealistic.

== Aftermath ==
During the 104th IOC meeting held in Budapest the bid got 7 votes and lost in the first round to Salt Lake City.
