= Bids for the 2002 Winter Olympics =

Overview
- XIX Olympic Winter Games
- Winner: Salt Lake City; Runner-up: Östersund; Shortlist: Sion · Quebec City

Details
- Committee: IOC
- Election venue: Budapest; 104th IOC Session

Map of the bidding cities

Important dates
- Decision: June 16, 1995

Decision
- Winner: Salt Lake City (54 votes)
- Runner-up: Östersund (14 votes)

A record 10 cities submitted bids to host the 2002 Winter Olympics (formally known as the XIX Olympic Winter Games). Due to the exceptionally large number of candidates, a procedure was created for the first time by the IOC for choosing a shortlist. The Games were awarded to Salt Lake City, Utah, United States, on June 16, 1995, during the 104th IOC Session in Budapest. The other cities shortlisted by the IOC Selection Committee chaired by Thomas Bach were Sion, Switzerland; Östersund, Sweden; and Quebec City, Quebec, Canada.

The host city selection procedure for the 2002 Winter Olympics faced a scandal regarding the interactions between the Salt Lake City bid team and International Olympic Committee (IOC) members; ten IOC members resigned as a result, as did Salt Lake City bid leaders Tom Welch and Dave Johnson. Nevertheless, Salt Lake City overwhelmingly won the right to host the Games, needing only one round to gain the absolute majority of the votes.

From both sporting and business standpoints, this was one of the most successful Winter Olympic Games in history; records were set in both the broadcasting and marketing programs. Over 2 billion viewers watched more than 13 billion viewer-hours. The Games were also financially successful raising more money with fewer sponsors than any prior Olympic Games, which left SLOC with a surplus of $40 million. The surplus was used to create the Utah Athletic Foundation, which maintains and operates many of the remaining Olympic venues.

== Final selection ==
2002 Host City Election — ballot results
City	Country (NOC)	Round 1
Salt Lake City	United States	54
Sion	Switzerland	14
Östersund	Sweden	14
Quebec City	Canada	7

== Proposed dates ==
City	XIX Olympic Winter Games (Note: Between the awarding of the bid and the Games themselves, the Games were extended from 16 to 17 days.)	VIII Paralympic Winter Games
Salt Lake City	9 - 24 February	3 - 13 March
Sion	9 - 24 February	2 - 17 March
Östersund	9 - 24 February	7 - 16 March
Quebec City	9 - 24 February	7 - 17 March
Alma-Ata	unknown	unknown
Graz	26 January - 10 February	16 - 26 February
Jaca	9 - 24 February	1 - 10 March
Poprad-Tatry	9 - 24 February	4 - 16 March
Sochi	9 - 24 February	30 March - 5 April
Tarvisio	2 - 17 February	26 February - 3 March

== Cities not shortlisted ==
- (Kazakhstan) Alma-Ata (withdrew before shortlist was chosen)
- (Austria) Graz
- (Spain) Jaca
- (Slovakia) Poprad-Tatry
- (Russia) Sochi (would later host the 2014 Winter Olympics)
- (Italy) Tarvisio

=== Candidature files ===
- Jaca 2002
- Sion 2002 Volume 1
- Sion 2002 Volume 2
- Sion 2002 Volume 3
- Östersund 2002 Volume 1
- Östersund 2002 Volume 2
- Östersund 2002 Volume 3
- Quebec City 2002 Volume 1
- Quebec City 2002 Volume 2
- Quebec City 2002 Volume 3

== See also ==
- 2002 Winter Olympic bid scandal
- Bids for the 2034 Winter Olympics – Also awarded to Salt Lake City
