= Bids for the 1976 Winter Olympics =

Overview
- XII Olympic Winter Games
- Winner: Denver; Runner-up: Sion; Shortlist: Tampere · Vancouver

Details
- Committee: IOC
- Election venue: 70th IOC Session, Amsterdam

Map of the bidding cities
- Missing location of the bidding cities

Important dates
- Decision: 12 May 1970

Decision
- Winner: Denver (29 votes)
- Runner-up: Sion (18 votes)

The selection process for the 1976 Winter Olympics consisted of four bids, and saw Denver, Colorado, United States, selected ahead of Sion, Switzerland; Tampere, Finland; and Vancouver, British Columbia, Canada. The selection was made at the 70th International Olympic Committee (IOC) Session in Amsterdam on 12 May 1970. The year 1976 was the centennial of the state of Colorado and bicentennial of the United States.

Holding the Games in Colorado began to have problems from 1972 onwards, when the venues for the skiing events were changed from established areas west of the Continental Divide, approved by the IOC during the 1972 Winter Olympics. Alpine events were moved to Vail from the undeveloped Mount Sniktau (and Loveland Ski Area) east of Loveland Pass, and the Nordic events moved from Evergreen to Steamboat Springs. The original sites submitted in the 1970 bid satisfied a requirement of proximity to the Olympic Village (at the University of Denver).

Organizers in the Denver Olympic Organizing Committee (DOCOG) had promised that the Games would only cost $14 million to be run, with Colorado Governor John Love stating that $5 million would come from taxpayers. However, rising costs and logistics soon came to plague the city and several proposals to save the Games in Denver were made, including one proposing the transfer of the sliding events to Lake Placid, New York. A grassroots movement formed against having the Games in Denver. Later that year on 7 November, Colorado voters rejected partially funding the games in a referendum, and for the first time a city awarded an Olympics rejected them. Denver officially withdrew on 15 November, and other financial issues led to second-place Sion declining to host the Olympics. The IOC then offered the Olympics to Whistler, British Columbia, Canada, but they too declined, owing to a change of government following elections. Whistler was later part of neighbouring Vancouver's successful bid for the 2010 Winter Olympics.

The third option was Salt Lake City, Utah, but they also declined and were replaced by Lake Placid, New York. At an extra meeting of the IOC executive committee held in their headquarters in Lausanne, Switzerland, on 4 February 1973, It was announced that after an invitation, Innsbruck, Austria agreed to host the 1976 Winter Olympics. The invitation was chosen due to the fact that the city had 100% of the facilities used in the 1964 Winter Olympics in the same conditions as nine years earlier and there was only a need to build a new Olympic Village that was next to the 1964 Village. The next Winter Olympics were in the United States at Lake Placid (awarded in October 1974), and Salt Lake City hosted in 2002 and will again in 2034.

== Results ==
First process – May 1970
City	Country	Round 1	Round 2	Round 3
Denver	United States	29	29	39
Sion	Switzerland	18	31	30
Tampere	Finland	12	8	—
Vancouver– Garibaldi	Canada	9	—	—

Second Process – February 1973
City	Country	Rank
Innsbruck	Austria	1
Lake Placid	United States	2
Chamonix	France	3
Tampere	Finland	4
