= Bids for the 1972 Winter Olympics =

Overview
- XI Olympic Winter Games
- Winner: Sapporo; Runner-up: Banff, Alberta; Shortlist: Lahti · Salt Lake City

Details
- Committee: IOC
- Election venue: 64th IOC Session, Rome

Map of the bidding cities
- Missing location of the bidding cities

Important dates
- Decision: 25 April 1966

Decision
- Winner: Sapporo (32 votes)
- Runner-up: Banff, Alberta (16 votes)

The selection process for the 1972 Winter Olympics consisted of three bids, and saw Sapporo, Japan, be selected ahead of Banff, Alberta, Canada; Lahti, Finland; and Salt Lake City, Utah, United States. The selection was made at the 64th IOC Session in Rome on 25 April 1966.

== Results ==
IOC voting
City	Country	Round 1
Sapporo	Japan	32
Banff	Canada	16
Lahti	Finland	7
Salt Lake City	United States	7
