= Bids for the 1928 Winter Olympics =

Overview
- II Olympic Winter Games
- Winner: St. Moritz; Shortlist: Davos · Engelberg

Details
- Committee: IOC
- Election venue: 24th IOC Session, Lisbon

Map of the bidding cities
- Missing location of the bidding cities

Important dates
- Decision: 6 May 1926

Decision
- Winner: St. Moritz
- Runner-up

The selection process for the 1928 Winter Olympics consisted of three bids, all from Switzerland, and saw St. Moritz be selected ahead of Davos and Engelberg. The selection was made at the 24th IOC Session in Lisbon, Portugal, on 6 May 1926.
