= Bids for the 1944 Winter Olympics =

Overview
- V Olympic Winter Games
- Winner: Cortina d'Ampezzo; Runner-up: Montreal; Shortlist: Oslo

Details
- Committee: IOC
- Election venue: 38th IOC Session, London

Map of the bidding cities
- Missing location of the bidding cities

Important dates
- Decision: 9 June 1939

Decision
- Winner: Cortina d'Ampezzo (16 votes)
- Runner-up: Montreal (12 votes)

The selection process for the 1944 Winter Olympics consisted of three bids, and saw Cortina d'Ampezzo, Italy, be selected ahead of Montreal, Quebec, Canada, and Oslo, Norway. The selection was made at the 31st IOC Session in London, Great Britain, on 9 June 1939. The games were ultimately not held due to the Second World War. Cortina d'Ampezzo was ultimately awarded two Winter Olympics in 1956 and 2026.

== Results ==
IOC voting
City	Country	Round 1
Cortina d'Ampezzo	Italy	16
Montreal	Canada	12
Oslo	Norway	2
