= Bids for the 1932 Winter Olympics =

Overview
- III Olympic Winter Games
- Winner: Lake Placid, New York; Shortlist: Bear Mountain · Denver · Duluth · Lake Tahoe

Details
- Committee: IOC
- Election venue: 27th IOC Session, Lausanne

Map of the bidding cities
- Missing location of the bidding cities

Important dates
- Decision: 10 April 1929

Decision
- Winner: Lake Placid, New York
- Runner-up

The selection process for the 1932 Winter Olympics consisted of nine bids. It saw Lake Placid, United States, be selected ahead of candidates Yosemite Valley, Lake Tahoe, Bear Mountain, Duluth, Minneapolis and Denver, Oslo, and Montreal, Quebec. The selection was made at the 27th IOC Session in Lausanne, Switzerland, on 10 April 1929.
