= Anchorage bids for the Winter Olympics =

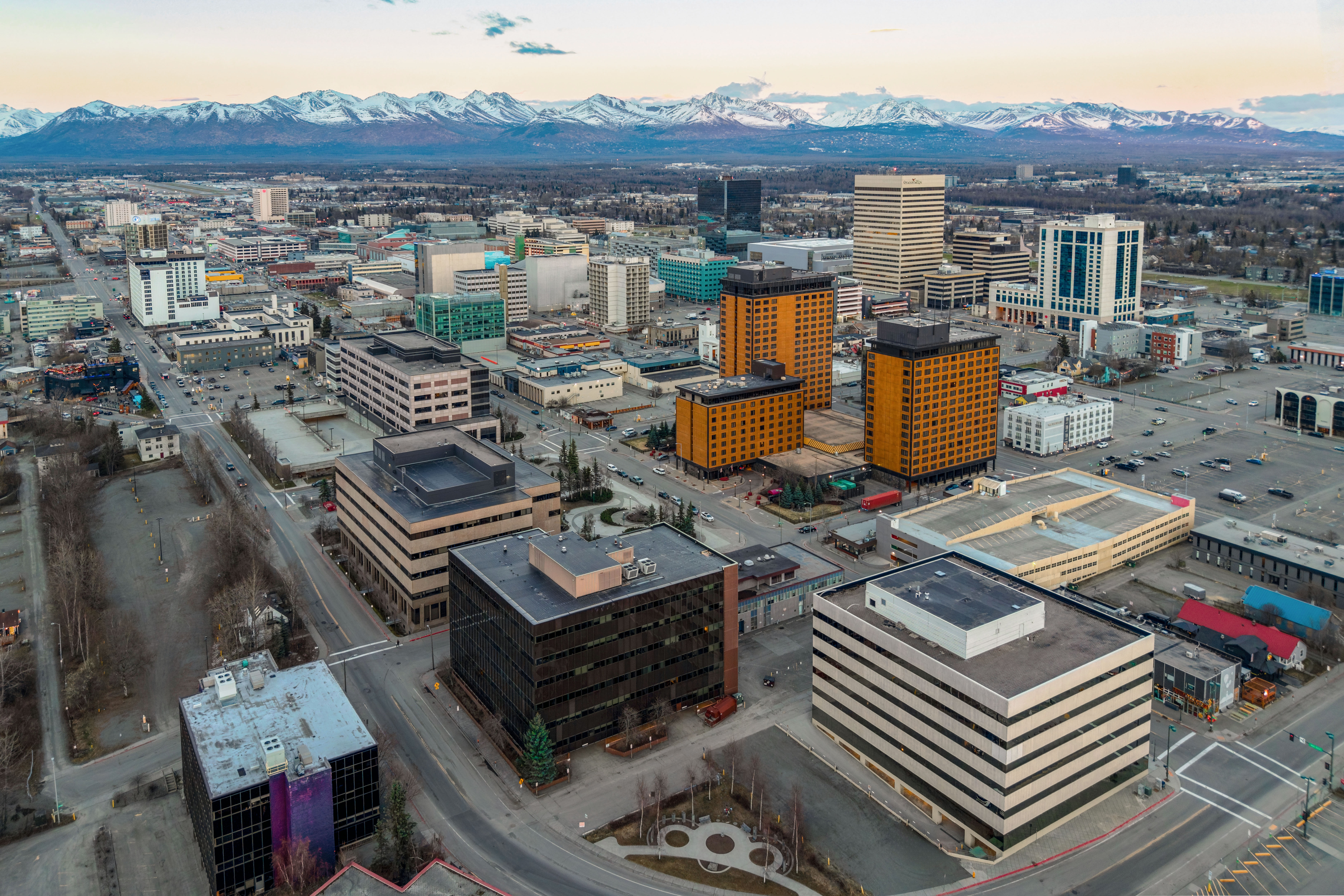
The skyline of Anchorage

The city of Anchorage, Alaska, in the United States, has unsuccessfully bid to host the Winter Olympic Games on several occasions. The most prominent of these occurred in 1986, bidding for the 1992 Winter Olympics, and 1988, bidding for the 1994 Winter Olympics. Both times, Anchorage had the backing of the U.S. Olympic Committee (USOC) as the designated American candidate city, but lost in the final host selection vote. Anchorage attempted to bid again for the 1998 games, but the USOC transferred its support to the bid from Salt Lake City, Utah.

== Background ==
The city of Anchorage seriously considered bidding to host the Winter Olympics as early as 1955. That year, the city sent a packet of materials to the U.S. Olympic Committee, which was deciding which city to promote as a potential American host for the 1960 Winter Olympics. The USOC passed over Anchorage and Reno, Nevada, in favor of Squaw Valley (now Olympic Valley), California, which was successfully awarded the Games. The Anchorage Winter Olympics Committee was formed in 1964 after former mayor George Byer suggested submitting a bid for the 1972 Winter Olympics. Anchorage's bid received no votes from the 42-member USOC executive board, which instead selected a bid from Salt Lake City, Utah (which ultimately lost the games to Sapporo, Japan). After Denver, Colorado, which had been awarded the 1976 Winter Olympics, backed out of hosting duties after a failed referendum in 1972, Alaska senators Ted Stevens and Mike Gravel briefly suggested that Anchorage could step in to take over the games, before dropping the idea due to a lack of preparations. After that rejection, the Anchorage Times remarked that "our community has been ignored and ignored and ignored" in its desire to host the Olympics.

== 1992 Winter Olympics ==
Plans for Anchorage to host the Winter Olympics grew more serious after a city-commissioned study in 1981 concluded that it was feasible. The study, part of the "Project 80s" program to construct civic improvements, was primarily intended to examine possible new winter sports facilities for Anchorage residents. It recommended spending $33 million on these facilities, but also found that when they were completed, Anchorage would already have Olympic-quality venues for all winter sports except the 90 meter ski jump and luge. Therefore, the study recommended spending an additional $15 million on these two venues and then bidding for the next available games, the 1992 Winter Olympics.

The city's 1992 bid was spearheaded by city assemblyman and advertising executive Rick Mystrom, who became the founder and president of the Anchorage Organizing Committee (AOC). Mystrom visited Sapporo, a former host city, as he researched the subject during the summer of 1983. He began his campaign on February 8, 1984, the same day as the opening ceremony of the 1984 Winter Olympics. However, Mystrom considered it unlikely that the IOC would award the 1992 games to a North American city when the 1988 Winter Olympics were already planned for Calgary, Alberta, so he initially focused on bidding for the next games, which were expected to occur in 1996.

Mystrom and other supporters of the bid approached the USOC in early 1985 about the possibility of being chosen as the United States candidate city for 1996. They learned that the USOC was preparing to choose a candidate city for the 1992 Winter Olympics, even though the IOC was unlikely to hold two North American winter games in a row, and that whichever city was chosen for 1992 would have a strong advantage in the bidding for 1996. The mayor of Anchorage rushed to make an official bid for 1992, entering the competition on April 8, 1985, two days before the deadline to apply and two months before the USOC would make its decision.

Four other cities competed against Anchorage for the USOC's approval as a 1992 candidate city: Lake Placid, New York (which had hosted the 1932 and 1980 Winter Olympics), the Reno–Lake Tahoe area of Nevada, Portland, Oregon, and Salt Lake City, Utah. Portland dropped out of contention in May, intending to focus on a bid for 1996. The other four cities made presentations to the Executive Board of the USOC during its annual meeting in Indianapolis, Indiana, on June 15, 1985. While the exact results of the Board's vote that afternoon were not disclosed, Anchorage was selected quickly, reportedly on the first ballot.

After being selected as the U.S. candidate city, Anchorage organizers became more optimistic that the city could actually be awarded the 1992 games, rather than just setting itself up for future consideration. Mystrom argued that, because all six of the other candidates were in Europe, the votes could be split between all of them, potentially allowing Anchorage to take the lead. Organizers also emphasized the fact that Europe had already held 10 of the 15 Winter Olympics up to 1992. To gauge public support for hosting the games, a non-binding referendum was held in October 1985. 66 percent of Anchorage voters supported the effort to host the Winter Olympics in their city.

The host city for the 1992 Winter Olympics was chosen at the 91st IOC Session in Lausanne, Switzerland, on October 17, 1986. Of the seven candidate cities, Anchorage was the second to be eliminated from contention, receiving fewer votes than supporters had expected. The games were ultimately awarded to Albertville, France. Also, during the same IOC meeting, it was decided that future Winter Olympics would be held in alternate even years from the Summer Olympics, meaning that the Winter Olympics after 1992 would be held in 1994, not 1996 as previously expected. Within 10 minutes of the announcement that Albertville had been selected, an Anchorage 1992 exhibit in the convention hall was modified to read "1994", and the AOC began filing paperwork for a 1994 candidacy later that day.

=== Venues ===
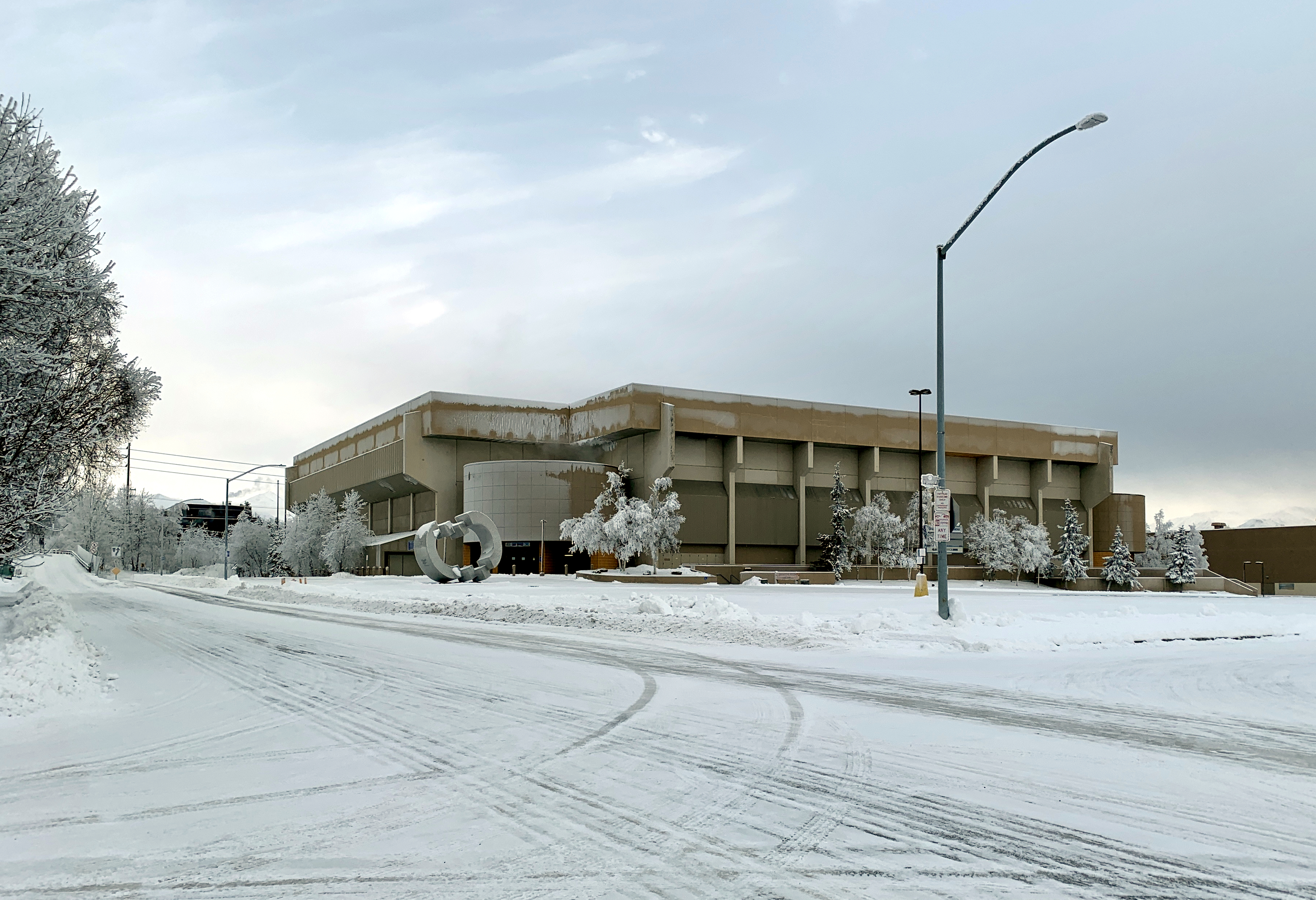
The Sullivan Arena was proposed for the figure skating and ice hockey competition.

The Anchorage bid Committee's bid book for the 1992 Winter Olympics listed the following venues that would be used.

Venue	Events
Delaney Park Strip (temporary seating)	Opening ceremony Closing ceremony
Kincaid Park	Biathlon; Cross-country skiing Nordic combined Ski jumping
Sullivan Arena	Figure skating Ice hockey
Fire Lake Arena (now Harry J. McDonald Memorial Center)	Figure skating (compulsory figures); Ice hockey (preliminaries)
Purpose-built venue in Mulcahy Park	Speed skating
Alyeska Resort	Alpine skiing Bobsled (alternate site); Luge (alternate site)
Birch Hill Park, Fairbanks	Bobsled; Luge
University of Alaska Anchorage	Olympic Village; Training and medical facilities
William A. Egan Civic and Convention Center	Olympic Press Center

== 1994 Winter Olympics ==
At the next USOC meeting, held on November 23, 1986, in Sparks, Nevada, the board nominated Anchorage as the U.S. candidate city for 1994. Despite protests from organizers in Portland, Reno–Tahoe, and Salt Lake City, the board members voted 44–14 to select Anchorage without any opportunity for presentations from other cities. USOC president Bob Helmick told the meeting that, with only two years to prepare for the next bidding process, Anchorage's recent bidding experience made it the only American city that could win.

The AOC at first proposed spending significantly more on its lobbying efforts, setting a fundraising goal of $3.4 million for the 1994 bid. However, at the 92nd IOC Session in Istanbul, Turkey, in May 1987, the IOC placed restrictions on the receptions that candidate cities could hold for IOC members. As a result, in July 1987, the AOC reduced its budget to $2.5 million. The organizers focused primarily on traveling to Africa, Asia, and Latin America to lobby IOC members in those regions, on the assumption that European members would tend to vote for European candidate cities.

In April 1988, reporting by the Anchorage Daily News publicly disclosed for the first time the fact that the city government could be held responsible for debts incurred by hosting the Olympics. Members of the Anchorage city assembly, along with the public, were previously unaware that this was a possibility. This was an established requirement of the IOC for all Olympic host cities, but because the requirement had been waived for Los Angeles in the 1984 Summer Olympics, AOC organizers assumed that the same would be done for Anchorage and so did not tell the city about it at first. Mayor Tony Knowles was informed of the city's liability in October 1987, shortly before he left office, and privately agreed to accept the financial risk without informing other city officials of it. Mayor Tom Fink, weeks after taking office in January 1988, did the same.

To address concerns about possible public debt, a second advisory referendum was held on August 23, 1988, three weeks before the 1994 host city would be chosen. Mystrom promised that the games would be entirely privately funded, and that the city's liability would only be a formality. He created a political action committee called Olympics Yes and warned that Anchorage would likely be forced to withdraw its bid if the referendum failed. According to the Anchorage Times, there was no organized opposition group encouraging residents to vote no. To avoid a situation similar to that of the 1976 Winter Olympics, where Denver was awarded the games and had to turn them down after a 1972 referendum failed, the vote had to be held before a host city was chosen for 1994. The referendum passed with 66 percent voting yes, the same margin that had supported the first referendum in 1985.

The host city for the 1994 Winter Olympics was chosen on September 15, 1988, at the 94th IOC Session in Seoul, South Korea, shortly before the opening of the 1988 Summer Olympics there. Among four candidate cities, Anchorage was the second to be eliminated, while Lillehammer, Norway, was selected as the host city.

=== Venues ===
The Anchorage Organizing Committee's bid book for the 1994 Winter Olympics listed the following venues that would be used.

Venue	Events
Olympic Stadium (purpose-built on Alaska Pacific University campus)	Opening ceremony Closing ceremony Figure skating Ice hockey Speed skating
Kincaid Park	Biathlon; Cross-country skiing
Alyeska Resort	Alpine skiing
Highland Mountain, Eagle River Valley	Bobsled; Luge; Ski jumping
University of Alaska Anchorage	Olympic Village; Training and medical facilities
Northern Lights Media Center (East Anchorage High School)	Press and broadcast facilities
William A. Egan Civic and Convention Center	Congress Hall

== 1998 Winter Olympics ==
Upon his return from Seoul, Rick Mystrom told his fellow Anchorage organizers that members of the IOC were encouraging the city to try again, reportedly telling him "1998 is Anchorage's turn". On September 28, 1988, the AOC board unanimously voted to make a bid for the 1998 games.

Again, before Anchorage could mount a serious bid to the IOC, it needed the approval of the USOC. In November 1988, the USOC created new rules for candidate host cities, requiring all candidates to begin construction on sports facilities before being selected as host city. This was done to ensure that, whether the city won the games or not, the U.S. would gain state-of-the-art training facilities for winter sports with less popularity. For Anchorage, this meant the city would be required to start construction on facilities it didn't already have, including bobsled and luge runs and a speed-skating rink, without knowing if it would actually host the Olympics. Since the AOC's plan was to finance the construction of these venues with the broadcast contracts it would receive after being chosen as host city, organizers admitted in February 1989 that they were not sure they could meet this requirement without government funding, which the AOC had avoided relying on up to that point. Alaska State Senate president Tim Kelly warned that the state was unlikely to fund construction of these venues, and said that requesting taxpayer money would damage Alaskans' support for the games.

The AOC did not develop a plan for funding construction of the venues before May 1989, when the USOC's site selection committee came to Anchorage to evaluate the city's prospects. The team criticized Anchorage for not having such a plan in place, and recommended that the city be eliminated from consideration. Anchorage organizers criticized the report, suggesting that some members of the committee were biased in favor of Salt Lake City's rival candidacy, and that the USOC was more concerned with creating new training facilities that would be easily accessible to the contiguous United States rather than actually hosting the Olympics. USOC president Robert Helmick admitted that the new training facilities were "a desperate, critical need" and "more critical than getting the Games for this country."

At the next meeting of the USOC's Executive Board, held in Des Moines, Iowa, on June 4, 1989, Anchorage presented alongside Denver, Reno–Sparks–Tahoe, and Salt Lake City as potential candidate cities. This time, Salt Lake City was chosen as the U.S. candidate. Additionally, a measure approved by the USOC board the previous day stipulated that the American candidate for 1998, if it was not selected as the host city, would be allowed to bid for 2002 without having to compete against other U.S. cities. As a result, the vote effectively ended Anchorage's ambitions to host the Winter Olympics in the near future. After the vote, Mystrom correctly predicted, "The '98 Games will be in Japan. Anchorage was the only [U.S.] city that could have won them. I'm sorry for what that means to sports in the United States."

== Aftermath ==
Salt Lake City lost the 1998 Winter Olympics to Nagano, Japan, but on its second try it was successfully awarded the 2002 Winter Olympics. Those games were marred by the 2002 Winter Olympic bid scandal, which revealed that the Salt Lake Organizing Committee had won over IOC members with lavish gifts, leading to allegations of illegal bribery. A 1999 congressional investigation into the bribery charges turned up a 1988 letter to Billy Payne, which said that Anchorage's disinterest in "playing the game" by offering a "blank check" to influential IOC members was hurting the city's bid. Payne was the chair of the Atlanta Committee for the Olympic Games, which successfully won the 1996 Summer Olympics and was implicated in the Salt Lake scandal. Rick Mystrom, who went on to serve as Anchorage's mayor from 1994 to 2000, later acknowledged that Salt Lake City "didn't beat us fair and square."

After 1989, Anchorage did not seriously entertain the possibility of hosting the Winter Olympics again until 2013, when Mayor Dan Sullivan announced that he would create an exploratory committee to consider a bid for the 2026 Winter Olympics. After the 2028 Summer Olympics were awarded to Los Angeles, the committee lost momentum, believing that the same country would not be awarded games two years apart.

The archives of the AOC, consisting of 34 boxes of materials, are held at the University of Alaska Anchorage/Alaska Pacific University Consortium Library.

== See also ==
- United States bids for the Olympic Games
- Los Angeles bids for the Summer Olympics
- Lake Placid bids for the Winter Olympics
- Salt Lake City bids for the Winter Olympics
- Lake Placid bids for the Winter Olympics
- Sports in Alaska
