= Bids for the 1992 Winter Olympics =

Overview
- XVI Olympic Winter Games
- Winner: Albertville; Runner-up: Sofia; Shortlist: Falun · Lillehammer · Cortina d'Ampezzo · Anchorage

Details
- Committee: IOC
- Election venue: 91st IOC Session; Lausanne, Switzerland

Map of the bidding cities
- Missing location of the bidding cities

Important dates
- Decision: 16 October 1986

Decision
- Winner: Albertville (51 votes)
- Runner-up: Sofia (25 votes)

The selection process for the 1992 Winter Olympics consisted of seven bids, and saw Albertville, France, selected. The bid also included the surrounding area of Savoie. Other bids were made by Sofia, Bulgaria; Falun, Sweden; Lillehammer, Norway; Cortina d'Ampezzo, Italy; Anchorage, Alaska, United States; and Berchtesgaden, West Germany. The selection was made at the 91st IOC Session in Lausanne, Switzerland, on 16 October 1986.

== Results ==
IOC voting
City	Country	Round 1	Round 2	Round 3	Round 4	Round 5	Round 6
Albertville	France	19	26	29	42	—	51
Sofia	Bulgaria	25	25	28	24	—	25
Falun	Sweden	10	11	11	11	41	9
Lillehammer	Norway	10	11	9	11	40	—
Cortina d'Ampezzo	Italy	7	6	7	—	—	—
Anchorage	United States	7	5	—	—	—	—
Berchtesgaden	West Germany	6	—	—	—	—	—
