= 142nd IOC Session =

IOC Session

The 142nd IOC Session was an IOC Session that was held in Paris, France from 22 to 24 July and resumed for a single day on 10 August 2024, as part of the 2024 Summer Olympics.

== Proceedings ==
=== 22 July ===
The opening ceremony for the Session was opened by French president Emmanuel Macron at the Louis Vuitton Foundation, in the Bois de Boulogne, and was termed as being "very sumptuous."

=== 23 July ===
Meeting at the Palais des Congrès de Paris at the Porte Maillot for the rest of the session, the IOC voted for the Olympic Esports Series to be replaced by the Olympic Esports Games, with the first edition being held in Saudi Arabia in 2025. The IOC also received updates on the Olympic AI Agenda, noting over 180 potential use cases for AI across the Olympic Movement.

=== 24 July ===
Both the 2030 and the 2034 Winter Olympics hosts were awarded at the session, with the French Alps and Salt Lake City each starting with their respective bid presentations, followed by a report from Karl Stoss, IOC Member and Chair of the Future Host City Commission of the Olympic Winter Games. Afterwards, the IOC proceeded with the voting on whether the committee accepted the French Alps and Salt Lake City, Utah as hosts of the 2030 and 2034 Winter Olympics, respectively.

The French bid was a latecomer in the competition to host, going into "targeted dialogue" with the IOC in late November 2023, only four months after declaring its intention to host the previous July. In contravention of the Olympic Charter, with the French Alps being chosen while the session was held in France, this became the first instance in which a candidate city had been chosen in the same country, the last time occurring in 1939 for the 1944 Olympic Games when no such prohibition existed. The year previous, a delay to 2025 was speculated by the media. Rule 33, Number 4 of the then-in force Charter forbids the election of a host city to take place in a country that is itself holding the Session for that election, stating "[t]he election of the host of the Olympic Games takes place in a country having no candidature for the organization of the Olympic Games concerned."

The French bid also lacked financial commitment from the national and regional governments, which made host city election conditional on those guarantees. At the time, even though the French president had no power to sign a formal financial and security guarantee, bid organizers expressed not doubt they would secure it following the 2024 French legislative election, which made the prime minister head of a caretaker government while a new one was chosen. This person in turn would be the signer when instructed by the president, with a deadline for 1 October 2024 set by the IOC. The French National Assembly would have to ratify it by 1 March 2025 to satisfy the IOC's conditions.

The American bid had previously signed an agreement which entailed that the organizers and Utah politicians would lobby the federal government to overturn Rodchenkov Act, named for Grigory Rodchenkov. The law permitted the federal government wide jurisdiction in doping enforcement worldwide, following the World Anti-Doping Agency's declaration that 23 Chinese swimmers who failed drug tests could compete in the 2020 Summer Olympics.

2030 Winter Olympics host city election
City	NOC name	Yes	No	Abs
French Alps	France	84	4	7

2034 Winter Olympics host city election
City	NOC name	Yes	No	Abs
Salt Lake City	United States	83	6	6

=== 10 August ===
Indian Olympic shooter Abhinav Bindra was presented with the Olympic Order which was awarded to him on 23 July.
