= List of Paralympic Games host cities =

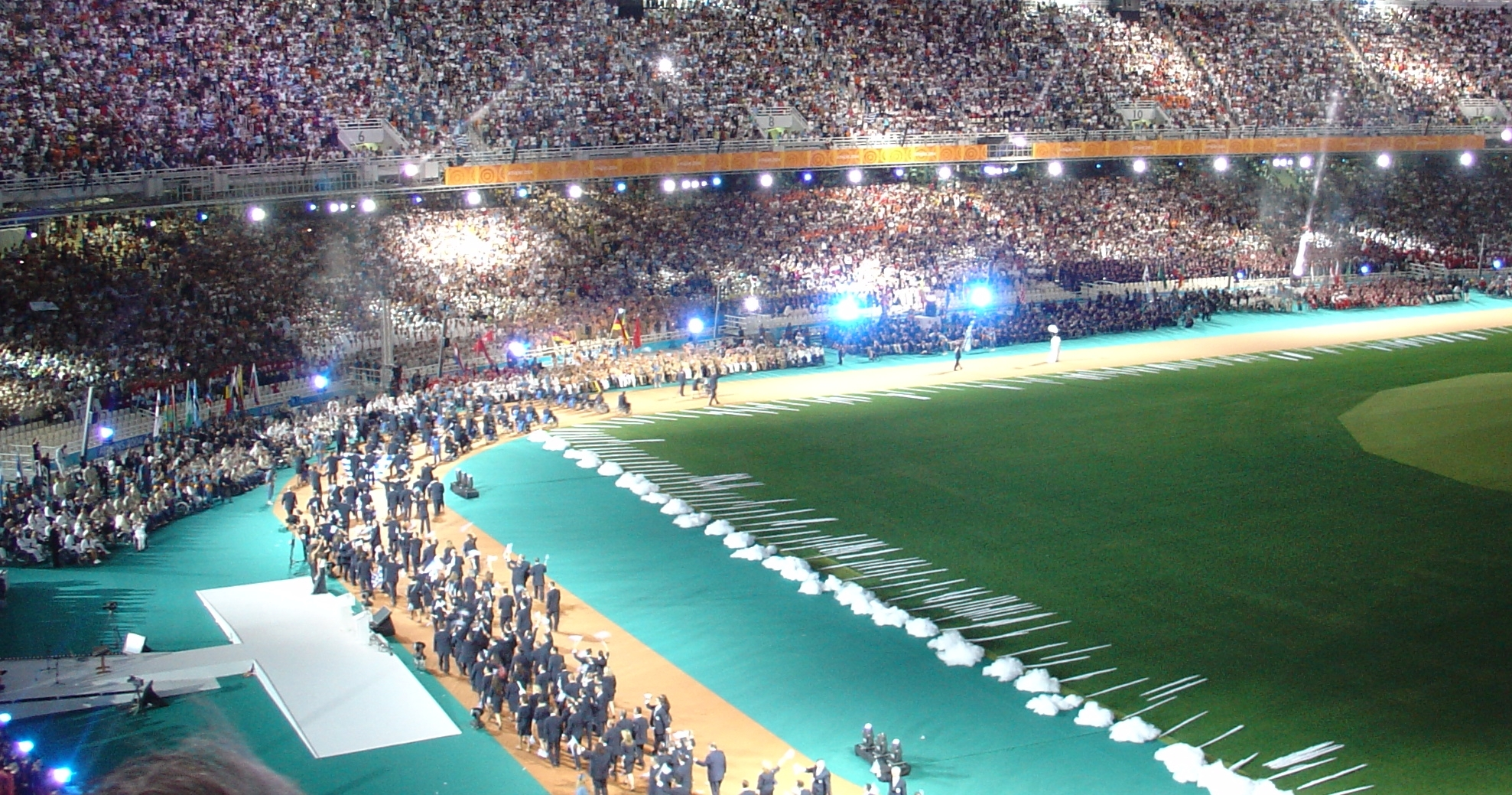
The opening ceremony of the 2004 Summer Paralympics in the Olympic Stadium in Athens, Greece

Since the Paralympic Games began in 1948, there have been 17 Summer Paralympic Games held in 17 separate cities and 14 Winter Paralympic Games held in 14 separate cities. Five cities have been chosen by the International Olympic Committee (IOC) and the International Paralympic Committee (IPC) to host the upcoming Paralympics: the French Alps for the 2030 Winter Paralympics, Brisbane for the 2032 Summer Paralympics, and Utah for the 2034 Winter Paralympics.

Four cities have hosted or are scheduled to host a Paralympic Games more than once; Innsbruck in 1984 and 1988, Beijing in 2008 (summer games) and 2022 (winter games), Tokyo in 1964 and 2020, and Salt Lake City in 2002 and 2034.

The United States hosted three games (with one partially hosted in the United Kingdom) and Japan hosted its third games in 2020. Austria, Norway, Italy, the United Kingdom, Canada, and China have each hosted two games.

The games have primarily been hosted on the continent of Europe (15 games). Eight games have been hosted in Asia and five in North America, and one games has been hosted in the region of Oceania. In 2016, the Paralympics were held in South America for the first time. No Paralympic Games have been hosted in the continents of Africa and Antarctica.

Host cities are selected by the International Olympic Committee (IOC) and the International Paralympic Committee (IPC). The selection process takes two years. In the first stage of the selection process, any city in the world may submit an application to become a host city. After ten months, the Executive Board of the IOC decides which of these applicant cities will become candidate cities based on the recommendation of a working group that reviews the applications. In the second stage, the candidate cities are investigated thoroughly by an Evaluation Commission, which then submits a final short list of cities to be considered for selection. The host city is then chosen by vote of the IOC Session, a general meeting of IOC members.

== Paralympic host cities ==
Year	City	Country	Continent	Summer	Winter	From	To
1960	(Italy) Rome	Italy	Europe	I		18 September	25 September
1964	(Japan) Tokyo	Japan	Asia	II		3 November	12 November
1968	(Israel) Tel Aviv	Israel	Asia	III		4 November	13 November
1972	(West Germany) Heidelberg	West Germany	Europe	IV		2 August	11 August
1976	(Sweden) Örnsköldsvik	Sweden	Europe		I	21 February	28 February
1976	(Canada) Toronto	Canada	Americas	V		3 August	11 August
1980	(Norway) Geilo	Norway	Europe		II	1 February	7 February
1980	(Netherlands) Arnhem	Netherlands	Europe	VI		21 June	30 June
1984	(Austria) Innsbruck	Austria	Europe		III	14 January	20 January
1984	(United States) New York (United Kingdom) Stoke Mandeville	United States, United Kingdom	Americas, Europe	VII		17 June; 22 July	30 June; 1 August
1988	(Austria) Innsbruck	Austria	Europe		IV	17 January	25 January
1988	(South Korea) Seoul	Republic of Korea	Asia	VIII		15 October	24 October
1992	(France) Tignes-Albertville	France	Europe		V	25 March	1 April
1992	(Spain) Barcelona-Madrid	Spain	Europe	IX		3 September	14 September
1994	(Norway) Lillehammer	Norway	Europe		VI	10 March	19 March
1996	(United States) Atlanta	United States	Americas	X		16 August	25 August
1998	(Japan) Nagano	Japan	Asia		VII	5 March	14 March
2000	(Australia) Sydney	Australia	Oceania	XI		18 October	29 October
2002	(United States) Salt Lake City	United States	Americas		VIII	7 March	16 March
2004	(Greece) Athens	Greece	Europe	XII		17 September	28 September
2006	(Italy) Turin	Italy	Europe		IX	10 March	19 March
2008	(China) Beijing^{[b]}	People's Republic of China	Asia	XIII		6 September	17 September
2010	(Canada) Vancouver	Canada	Americas		X	12 March	21 March
2012	(United Kingdom) London	Great Britain	Europe	XIV		29 August	9 September
2014	(Russia) Sochi	Russia	Europe		XI	7 March	16 March
2016	(Brazil) Rio de Janeiro	Brazil	Americas	XV		7 September	18 September
2018	(South Korea) Pyeongchang	Republic of Korea	Asia		XII	9 March	18 March
2020	(Japan) Tokyo	Japan	Asia	XVI		25 August 2021	6 September 2021 ^{[c]}
2022	(China) Beijing	People's Republic of China	Asia		XIII	4 March	13 March
2024	(France) Paris	France	Europe	XVII		28 August	8 September
2026	(Italy) Milan-Cortina d'Ampezzo	Italy	Europe		XIV	6 March	15 March
2028	(United States) Los Angeles	United States	Americas	XVIII		15 August	27 August
2030	(France) Alps	France	Europe		XV	1 March	10 March
2032	(Australia) Brisbane	Australia	Oceania	XIX		24 August	5 September
2034	(United States) Utah	United States	Americas		XVI	10 March	19 March

== Statistics ==
=== Host cities for multiple Paralympic Games ===
Rank	City	Country	Continent	Summer Paralympics hosted	Winter Paralympics hosted	Total Paralympics hosted
1	Innsbruck	Austria	Europe	0	2 (1984, 1988)	2
1	Tokyo	Japan	Asia	2 (1964, 2020)	0	2
1	Beijing	People’s Republic of China	Asia	1 (2008)	1 (2022)	2
1	Salt Lake City	United States	Americas	0	2 (2002, 2034)	2

=== Total Paralympic Games by country ===
Rank	Country	Continent	Summer Paralympics hosted	Winter Paralympics hosted	Total Paralympics hosted
1	United States	Americas	3 (1984, 1996, 2028)	2 (2002, 2034)	5
2	Japan	Asia	2 (1964, 2020)	1 (1998)	3
2	Italy	Europe	1 (1960)	2 (2006, 2026)	3
2	France	Europe	1 (2024)	2 (1992, 2030)	3
5	Austria	Europe	0	2 (1984, 1988)	2
5	Norway	Europe	0	2 (1980, 1994)	2
5	Canada	Americas	1 (1976)	1 (2010)	2
5	(United Kingdom) Great Britain	Europe	2 (1984, 2012)	0	2
5	South Korea	Asia	1 (1988)	1 (2018)	2
5	China	Asia	1 (2008)	1 (2022)	2
5	Australia	Oceania	2 (2000, 2032)	0	2
12	Israel	Asia	1 (1968)	0	1
12	West Germany	Europe	1 (1972)	0	1
12	Sweden	Europe	0	1 (1976)	1
12	Netherlands	Europe	1 (1980)	0	1
12	Spain	Europe	1 (1992)	0	1
12	Greece	Europe	1 (2004)	0	1
12	Russia	Europe	0	1 (2014)	1
12	Brazil	Americas	1 (2016)	0	1

== Notes ==
- ^{a} Although Tel Aviv is located in Asia, Israel is member of European Region of IPC.
- ^{b} Equestrian events were held in China's Hong Kong SAR. Although Hong Kong's separate NPC conducted the equestrian competition, it was an integral part of the Beijing Games; it is not conducted under a separate bid, flame, etc. The IPC website lists only Beijing as the host city.
- ^{c} Postponed to 2021, due to the COVID-19 pandemic, marking the first time that the Paralympic Games has been postponed. They are still called the 2020 Summer Paralympics, even with the change in scheduling to one year later. The new dates were later confirmed as 24 August to 5 September 2021.

== See also ==
- List of Olympic Games host cities
