= Bids for the 2030 Winter Olympics =

Bids for the 2030 Winter Olympics and Paralympics
Overview
- XXVI Olympic Winter Games; XV Paralympic Winter Games
- Winner: French Alps

Details
- Committee: IOC
- Election venue: 142nd IOC Session; Paris

Map of the bidding cities

Important dates
- Decision: 24 July 2024

Decision
- Winner: French Alps (84 votes)
- Runner-up

The selection of the host for the 2030 Winter Olympics saw a new process being introduced from 2019. The bidding process saw the French Alps, France, chosen as the preferred and expected host that was officially certified by the IOC before the 2024 Summer Olympics on 24 July 2024 in Paris, France.

== Bidding process ==
The new IOC bidding process was approved at the 134th IOC Session on 24 June 2019 in Lausanne, Switzerland. The key proposals, driven by the relevant recommendations from Olympic Agenda 2020, were:

- Establish a permanent, ongoing dialogue to explore and create interest among cities/regions/countries and National Olympic Committees for any Olympic event
- Create two Future Host Commissions (Summer and Winter Games) to oversee interest in future Olympic events and report to the IOC executive board
- Give the IOC Session more influence by having non-executive board members form part of the Future Host Commissions.

The IOC also modified the Olympic Charter to increase its flexibility in choosing hosts by making the date of elections more flexible and allowing multiple cities, regions, or countries to host instead of only single cities, regions, or countries.

=== Future host winter commissions ===
The full composition of the winter commissions, which oversaw interested hosts or engage with potential hosts with which the IOC may want to create interest, was as follows:

IOC members (4)	Other members (4)
(Austria) Karl Stoss (chair); (Slovakia) Danka Barteková; (Norway) Astrid Uhrenholdt Jacobsen; (Afghanistan) Samira Asghari	(China) Zhang Hong (Athletes); (United Kingdom) Colin Grahamslaw (AIOWF); (Chile) Neven Ilic (NOCs); (Netherlands) Rita van Driel (IPC member)

=== Dialogue stages ===
According to the Future Host Commission's rules of conduct, the new IOC bidding system is divided into 2 dialogue stages:

==== Continuous dialogue ====
Non-committal discussions between the IOC and interested parties (City/Region/Country/NOC interested in hosting) with regard to hosting future Olympic events.

During the Olympic Summit on 9 December 2022, the IOC informed that they remained in "Continuous Dialogue" with several well-developed projects by parties that had expressed interest in the 2030 Olympic Winter Games and with whom intense collaboration was ongoing. The Summit was also informed that the commission was looking into challenges and opportunities facing future Olympic Winter Games, such as the impact of climate change. A number of proposals that could have an impact on future elections were discussed, including rotation of the Games within a certain pool of hosts, minimum climate conditions, and existing infrastructure criteria.

Upon the request of the commission, the IOC Executive Board decided to give the Commission more time to study all these factors to make the best possible decisions about future hosting, including a revised 2030 election timeframe.

==== Targeted dialogue ====
Targeted discussions with one or more interested parties (called preferred host(s)), as instructed by the IOC Executive Board. This follows a recommendation by the Future Host Commission as a result of continuous dialogue.

Following a recommendation by the International Olympic Committee (IOC)'s Future Host Commission for the Olympic Winter Games, the IOC Executive Board (EB) on 29 November 2023 invited the French National Olympic Committee (CNOSF) into "Targeted Dialogue" towards hosting the Olympic and Paralympic Winter Games 2030 in the French Alps.

=== Host selection ===
The French Alps was confirmed as host of the 2030 Winter Olympics at the 142nd IOC Session on 24 July 2024 in Paris, France. As per the new format of choosing future Olympic Games host cities from the IOC's Agenda 2020, the vote was in a form of a referendum to the 95 IOC delegates.

2030 Winter Olympics host city election
City	NOC name	Yes	No	Abs
French Alps	France	84	4	7

== Developments ==
The decision on the 2030 Winter Olympics host city was delayed until 24 July 2024, to allow the IOC more time to carefully plan the future of the Winter Olympics. Due to impacts from climate change and other economic factors, the IOC began studying a number of changes to future games, such as rotating host cities, limiting the games to existing or temporary venues, and establishing minimum average temperature requirements. It also considered awarding the 2030 and 2034 winter games simultaneously at the next IOC session, but IOC President Thomas Bach had ruled out that possibility because "it would not be the right thing to do." However, at the 141st IOC Session in Mumbai, where these games were originally set to be awarded, the IOC approved to award both the 2030 and 2034 Winter Olympics at the 142nd IOC Session in Paris on the eve of the 2024 Summer Olympics.

=== Bid details ===
Bid Party	Country	National Olympic Committee	Bid Committee Website	Status	Main article
Salt Lake City	United States	U.S. Olympic & Paralympic Committee (USOPC)		Stakeholders	
Stockholm–Åre	Sweden	Swedish Olympic Committee (SOC)		Stakeholders	
A collective bid from cities and cantons in Switzerland	Switzerland	Swiss Olympic Association (SOA)		Stakeholders	
A joint bid from cities and regions at the French Alps	France	French National Olympic and Sports Committee (CNOSF)		Stakeholders	

== Cancelled and withdrawn bids ==
City	Country	National Olympic Committee	Withdrawn Date
A three-country bid involving Lviv, an unknown city in Poland and Sigulda	Ukraine Poland Latvia	National Olympic Committee of Ukraine (NOCU) Polish Olympic Committee (PKOI) Latvian Olympic Committee (LOK)	2022
In November 2019, the mayor of the Ukrainian city of Lviv announced that the city would bid for the 2030 Winter Olympics, as well as the 2028 Winter Youth Olympics. The Nordic and ice sports would be staged in Poland, the bobsleigh and luge competitions in Sigulda, Latvia. After the Russian invasion of Ukraine in February 2022, a bid was unlikely to progress.
Barcelona and Zaragoza – Pyrenees	Spain	Spanish Olympic Committee (COE)	21 June 2022
On 21 June 2022, Spain's bid withdrew, due to a political row between autonomous communities: Catalonia and Aragon, where the Pyrenees mountain range extends.
Vancouver, British Columbia	Canada	Canadian Olympic Committee (COC)	27 October 2022
Main article: Vancouver bid for the 2030 Winter Olympics On 27 October 2022, the provincial government of British Columbia said that they would not support a bid to host the 2030 Winter Olympics in Vancouver. The government said it would put pressing priorities such as economic conditions and public interest over the Olympics. Vancouver hosted the 2010 Winter Olympics and it would have become the fifth city to host the Winter Olympics twice after St. Moritz, Innsbruck, Lake Placid and Cortina d'Ampezzo.
A three-country bid involving the neighboring regions of Chamonix, Valais, and the Aosta Valley	France Switzerland Italy	French National Olympic and Sports Committee (CNOSF) Swiss Olympic Association (SOA) Italian National Olympic Committee (CONI)	4 January 2023
On 4 January 2023, Swiss newspaper Le Temps reported that a bid was being prepared centred around Espace Mont-Blanc, a cross-border initiative with several Alpine regions, including Valais, Chamonix and the Aosta Valley. However the next day Éric Fournier, Mayor of Chamonix-Mont-Blanc, indicated that "the project of a cross-border candidacy for Olympic Games as relayed by certain media is not on the agenda", and that there was public opposition to the bid. Chamonix hosted the first Winter Olympic Games in 1924, while Sion and Aosta made failed bids for the Winter Olympics.
Sapporo and Hokkaido Prefecture	Japan	Japanese Olympic Committee (JOC)	6 October 2023
Main article: Sapporo bid for the 2030 Winter Olympics In December 2022, Sapporo officials said that organizers would "discontinue for some time" while investigating the scandal relating to Tokyo 2020, but the bid would not be canceled. On 10 April 2023 Japanese Olympic Committee President Yasuhiro Yamashita revealed that talks were set to get underway over possibly delaying Sapporo's bid from 2030 to 2034. On 6 October 2023, Sapporo decided to walk away from bidding for 2030 altogether.

== Potential bids ==
- Almaty, Kazakhstan
- (Georgia (country)) Borjomi, Georgia
- Calgary, Canada
- Trojena, Saudi Arabia
- Sarajevo, Bosnia and Herzegovina
- Mount Isa, Australia
- Monterrey, Nevado de Toluca, Pico de Orizaba and Arteaga, Coahuila, Mexico

== Bidding parties ==
The three first potential submitting bidding parties were revealed by Octavian Morariu, the chair of the Future Host Winter Commission, during the 135th IOC Session at the SwissTech Convention Centre in Lausanne, Switzerland in January 2020. He mentioned Salt Lake City of the United States, Sapporo of Japan and a joint bid from the Spanish cities of Barcelona and Zaragoza at the Pyrenees region have conducted feasibility studies. In 2022, Spain withdrew their bid. Vancouver, Canada, made a preliminary bid submission in February 2021, but withdrew in October 2022.

Media reported on 29 June 2023 that five countries had officially declared interest in hosting a future edition of the Olympic and Paralympic Winter Games and that a sixth had expressed interest but had yet to enter into 'continuous dialogue'. IOC Executive Director Christophe Dubi also confirmed the countries were:

- Sweden
- Switzerland
- United States
- Canada
- Japan
- France

=== Stakeholders ===
Stakeholders were those cities or regions that had expressed potential interest in hosting the Games. Seven National Olympic Committees had expressed interest, though Spain, Canada, and Japan later withdrew. The remaining four interested sites were as follows:

City	Country	National Olympic Committee
Salt Lake City, Utah	United States	United States Olympic & Paralympic Committee (USOPC)
Main article: Salt Lake City bid for the 2030 Winter Olympics Site of the 2002 Winter Olympics, the 2002 Winter Paralympics and the 2007 Winter Deaflympics. The bid relied on existing infrastructure and private funding. In December 2018, the U.S. Olympic & Paralympic Committee named Salt Lake City, Utah, as U.S. choice for a future Olympic and Paralympic Winter Games bid. The Salt Lake City-Utah Committee for the Games was formed in February 2020 to pursue a bid for 2030 or 2034 Games. The committee bolstered its engagement with athletes in governance in June 2021, naming four-time Olympic speed skater Catherine Raney-Norman as its chair. In February 2020, following the announcement of Sapporo's bid, the organizing committee for the Salt Lake City bid considered moving their intention to bid for the 2034 Games as the Summer Games are scheduled for Los Angeles in 2028. At the first meeting in June 2021, the organizing committee considered whether it should change the bid for 2034. The decision for Salt Lake City on the bidding for 2030 or 2034 Winter Olympics was made after the 2022 Winter Paralympics ended. President and chief executive of the Salt Lake City bid committee Fraser Bullock mentioned that the small window between the Los Angeles 2028 and a potential Salt Lake City 2030 Games could be a real difficulty to manage and that the feasibility study for this was still ongoing. The IOC sent a delegation to Salt Lake City, from 27 to 29 April 2022, to conduct an inspection and a technical site visit of the competitions, ceremonies and Olympic Village proposed venues. Bullock confirmed at a meeting on 1 November 2022 that "the upcoming process is focused on 2030 and [SLC] will fully participate in that process to hopefully get either the 2030 or 2034 Olympics". On 29 November 2023, the IOC announced that it had initiated a targeted dialogue phase with the United States, designating it as the proposal most likely to be selected for 2034.
Stockholm–Åre	Sweden	Swedish Olympic Committee (SOK)
Stockholm hosted the 1912 Summer Olympics and was the host city of the equestrian events at the 1956 Summer Olympics. Stockholm and Åre previously bid for 2026 but lost out to Milano-Cortina, Italy. On 8 February 2023, the Swedish Olympic Committee (SOK) initiated a feasibility study regarding the Olympics and Paralympics in Sweden in 2030. On 15 June 2023 SOK presented the feasibility study report. As a result, Sweden's united sports movement would continue with its work to arrange the Winter Games in Sweden in 2030. The feasibility study's proposal for the same sports concept used for the failed bid for the 2026 Winter Olympics. With the ice sports and ceremonies in the Stockholm region, Nordic sports in Falun, snow sports shared by Åre and Östersund and sliding sports in Sigulda, Latvia or Lillehammer, Norway. For the Paralympics, some changes were proposed with the Nordic events to be moved to Östersund. Only existing venues and structures will be used, with the Olympic Villages as the only new work specific for the games. Seven out of ten Swedes thought that Sweden should apply for the Olympics and Paralympics in 2030 if the feasibility study showed that it was possible to implement sustainable, democratic, and cost-effective games. The IOC was informed that SOK wanted to proceed to step two of the process and the IOC had welcomed SOK to the next phase, SOK President Hans von Uthmann confirmed. The conclusion results of the feasibility study was that Sweden was ready to move on to the next step in the process. Stockholm would have become the second city after Beijing to host both the Summer and Winter Olympics. The Stockholm Chamber of Commerce and the Swedish Government would announce their support for the bid on 13 November 2023.
Switzerland (host city was not specified)		Swiss Olympic Association (SOA)
Host country of the 1928 Olympic Winter Games, 1948 Olympic Winter Games and 2020 Winter Youth Olympics. The Swiss Olympic Association (AOS) confirmed that they were into the "continuous dialogue" of the "Future Host Process" on 30 March 2023. As part of the dialogue, AOS would examine whether the prerequisites for a possible Swiss Olympic bid were met. For AOS, it was clear that a new Swiss bid can only be considered after careful examination. A bid concept only had a chance if it was sustainable and the Games leave a legacy that goes beyond sport – to society, the economy and Switzerland as a location for innovation. The event would have been spread out across the entire country and used existing facilities and infrastructure. Switzerland hosted the 1928 and 1948 Winter Olympics in St. Moritz, and the 2020 Winter Youth Olympics in Lausanne. Sion had bid for the 2006 Winter Olympics but lost to Turin, Italy. On 18 October 2023 it was announced that Switzerland intended to bid for the 2030 Winter Olympics. With the French and American bids having entered targeted dialogue phases, the IOC Executive Board would also invite the Switzerland bid to a "privileged dialogue" for potentially hosting the 2038 Winter Olympics, which would celebrate 90th anniversary from last hosted games in St. Moritz.
French Alps	France	French National Olympic and Sports Committee (CNOSF)
Host area of the 1924 Winter Olympic Games, 1968 Winter Olympic Games, and the 1992 Winter Olympic Games. On 19 July 2023, the presidents of the regional councils of Provence-Alpes-Côte d'Azur and Auvergne-Rhône-Alpes, Renaud Muselier and Laurent Wauquiez, expressed the wish to propose to the sports movement and the French Parliament to submit a joint bid to the IOC. The bid was determined to take into account the issues related to the preservation of biodiversity and the acceleration of global warming and to be part of a broader strategy on the winter sports of tomorrow, in the context of global warming. Some regions included previously bid for the 2018 Winter Olympics. The Games plan is to use existing infrastructures, reduce organisational costs, and finance mainly through private revenues. Following the meeting of the presidents it was intended to transmit to the IOC the wish to open a formal dialogue phase, to submit a draft application to the CNOSF and the CNPSF and their legislative bodies in September, and to submit the project to the Future Host Commission for the Olympic Winter Games in the second half of September 2023. On 29 November 2023, the IOC announced that it had initiated a targeted dialogue phase with France, designating it as the proposal most likely to be selected for 2030. It celebrates 130th anniversary from the first olympics in Paris and France in 1900.
