= Sapporo bid for the 2030 Winter Olympics =

Proposed bid to bring the 2030 Winter Olympics to Sapporo, Japan

Bids for the 2030 Winter Olympics and Paralympics
Overview
- XXVI Olympic Winter Games; XV Paralympic Winter Games

Details
- City: Sapporo, Japan
- NOC: Japanese Olympic Committee (JOC)

Previous Games hosted
- 1972 Winter Olympics

The Sapporo bid for the 2030 Winter Olympics was a proposed bid to bring the 2030 Winter Olympics to the city of Sapporo, Japan. After the 1940 Winter Olympics were abandoned due to war, Sapporo previously hosted the 1972 Winter Olympics, the first time that the Winter Olympics were held in Asia. They also hosted the 1986 Asian Winter Games, 1990 Asian Winter Games, 2017 Asian Winter Games and most recently the FIS Nordic World Ski Championships 2007 and 2015 World Women's Curling Championship.

== Details ==
Sapporo 2030 was the first official bid for the 2030 Winter Olympics.

Sapporo was initially considered to bid for the 2026 Winter Olympics, but was withdrawn on 17 September 2018.

Due to the cost overrun from the postponement of the 2020 Summer Olympics and facing a very likely situation of withdrawing the bid, a revised budget was released which would lower the cost of the games to between 280 billion and 300 billion yen.

A recent report which was released before the start of the Beijing Games showed that, due to climate change, by the end of the century, Sapporo might be the only city among the 21 cities to have hosted the Winter Olympics to be able to provide fair and safe conditions to host the Winter Olympics.

In March 2022, Sapporo's government released a draft plan for the games.

In December 2022, Sapporo officials said that organizers would "discontinue for some time" while investigating the scandal relating to Tokyo 2020, but the bid would not be canceled.

On 10 April 2023 Japanese Olympic Committee President Yasuhiro Yamashita has revealed that talks were set to get underway over possibly delaying Sapporo's bid from 2030 to 2034. On 6 October 2023, Sapporo decided to walk away from bidding for 2030 altogether.

== Impact of Tokyo 2020 Bribery scandal ==
A number of bribery and corruption allegations tied to the 2020 Tokyo Olympic and Paralympic Games have surfaced since mid-2022, which have been viewed as a potential setback for Japan in its bid to host the 2030 Games. Seiko Hashimoto, an Olympic bronze medalist, politician and former head of the Tokyo 2020 Organising Committee, said in December 2022 that the scandal seemed "very severe," adding that it was important to sort the issues out so that Sapporo can proceed with its 2030 Olympic bid efforts. Later that month, Hokkaido Governor Naomichi Suzuki admitted that it was "difficult to keep fostering momentum" for the 2030 Olympic bid due to the corruption allegations. Sapporo mayor Katsuhiro Akimoto announced on 20 December 2022 that his city would halt the aggressive promotion of its 2030 Olympic bid in order to "dispel the public's unease" about the scandals and reconsider their promotion tactics.
