= Department of State Policy Provisions Bill =

Proposed U.S. legislation

Department of State Policy Provisions Act
- Long title: To guide the foreign policy of the United States, and for other purposes.

Legislative history
- Introduced in the House as H.R. 5300 by Brian Mast (R–TX) on September 11, 2025; Committee consideration by United States House Committee on Foreign Affairs

The Department of State Policy Provisions Bill is a 2025 proposed Act of Congress introduced by Representative Brian Mast (R-FL) Chairman of the House Foreign Affairs Committee. The bill is part of a larger package of legislation to reform the State Department.

== Background ==
Secretary of State Marco Rubio had previously revoked the visa of Tufts University doctoral student Rumeysa Ozturk from Turkey, after she had written an op-ed criticizing Israel. The US Department of Homeland Security revoked her visa on the basis of Ozturk having allegedly “engaged in activities in support of” Hamas, a US-designated terrorism organization. Ozturk had expressed support for the Boycott, Divestment and Sanctions (BDS) campaign, but had not mentioned Hamas.

== Content ==
The bill consists primarily of a suite of foreign policy objectives and funding directions for the United States Department of State, which were tabled as a standalone measure rather than incorporated into a National Defense Authorization Act. Among other directives, it included directives for.

- Establishing a program to recruit and train "specialized disaster assistance professionals" to serve within the State Department.
- Developing a strategy for enhancing "citizen safety and the rule of law" in the member countries of the Caribbean Basin Security Initiative.
- Developing an initiative to increase trade and investments between the U.S. and Africa.
- Developing resources and tools for helping other countries to screen foreign investments for national security risks.
- Developing a five-year sports diplomacy strategy to help enhance U.S. "soft power, diplomatic relationships, and global leadership" during the "mega-decade" of U.S.-hosted international sporting events between 2024 and 2034 (spanning from the 2024 Copa América, 2026 FIFA World Cup, 2028 Summer Olympics and Paralympics, 2031 Men's Rugby World Cup, 2033 Women's Rugby World Cup, to the 2034 Winter Olympics and Paralympics).
- Not recognizing claims of sovereignty over the Russian-occupied territories of Abkhazia and South Ossetia that are not those of Georgia.
- Authorizing the president to "provide certain types of assistance to foreign countries to enhance the ability of their intelligence and military personnel to deter international terrorism"
- Authorizing "the extension of certain diplomatic immunities to the Pacific Islands Forum."

== Legislative history ==
Mast introduced the bill on September 11, 2025, to the House Foreign Affairs Committee. The Committee held its first hearing for the bill on September 17, 2025.

When originally introduced, the bill contained a provision that would allow the Secretary of State to revoke passports or passport applications belonging to people who have "knowingly aided, assisted, abetted, or otherwise provided material support to an organization the Secretary has designated as a foreign terrorist organization pursuant to section 219 of the Immigration and Nationality Act." The provision faced criticism over the possibility that it could be abused for political purposes (especially under Secretary Marco Rubio), including the revocation of passports without due process for individuals suspected of supporting a terrorist organization; journalist Zaid Jilani noted that courts already had the power to revoke passports, and American Civil Liberties Union (ACLU) senior policy counsel Kia Hamadanchy argued that the ability was unnecessary due to the long prison sentences that those convicted of terrorism usually face.

On September 14, 2025, Mast introduced a manager's amendment to remove the passport provisions. An amendment was also approved by the Foreign Affairs Committee to prohibit the U.S. government from recognizing the Georgian Dream government in Georgia.
