= Vancouver bid for the 2030 Winter Olympics =

Bids for the 2030 Winter Olympics and Paralympics
Overview
- XXVI Olympic Winter Games; XV Paralympic Winter Games

Details
- City: Vancouver, British Columbia
- NOC: Canadian Olympic Committee (COC)

Previous Games hosted
- 2010 Winter Olympics

The Vancouver bid for the 2030 Winter Olympics was a proposed bid to bring the 2030 Winter Olympics to the province of British Columbia in Canada, with Vancouver and Whistler were expected to serve as the main host cities. Vancouver and Whistler previously hosted the 2010 Winter Olympics and the 2010 Winter Paralympics, while Canada also hosted the 1976 Summer Olympics in Montreal, the 1976 Summer Paralympics in Toronto and the 1988 Winter Olympics with Calgary as main host, along another venues in the province of Alberta.

== Details ==
In May 2014, with many potential candidates withdrawing their bids for the 2022 Winter Olympics due to several motives, the idea for Vancouver to host the Olympics again began floating around. At that time, Stockholm and Kraków already withdrew their bids, along with Munich and St. Moritz who got negative referendums for their candidacies. Given Lviv's candidacy to be eliminated due to the Ukrainian political crisis, this meant Oslo would have been considered the frontrunner. However, on 1 October, Oslo also withdrew. This raised questions about whether Almaty or Beijing could be selected to host the 2022 Winter Olympics; Beijing was ultimately selected. Due to the troubled bidding process, some specialists wondered about the possibility of a recent host such as Vancouver or Salt Lake City could be invited directly to host the games. A similar situation occurred in 1976, when Innsbruck, the host of 1964 Winter Olympics, replaced Denver as host of the 1976 Winter Olympics.

In October 2021, it was revealed that 43% of people in British Columbia supported the bid, a considerable drop from 60% a year earlier.

Another poll by Leger and Leger conducted in December 2021 showed that more than 65% of British Columbians were supportive or neutral about the candidature. 62% supported the bid that won the 2010 Winter Olympics.

In February 2022, the Canadian Olympic Committee and its Paralympic counterpart signed an agreement with the cities of Vancouver and Whistler, as well as several B.C. First Nations organizations, to explore the feasibility of a bid for 2030. The bid group's current goal is to host the games in B.C., without reference to a primary host city at this time, under the interim name "B.C. 2030". The COC has also disavowed any relationship with an unofficial "Vancouver 2030" organization, which had been reported in some media as being the official bid committee.

More detailed plans were revealed in June 2022; about 85% to 95% of the existing venues from the 2010 games would be reused, but with some small changes such as the creation of a cluster in Hastings Park that would encompass the Pacific Coliseum, the PNE Agrodome (which would host the curling in place of the Hillcrest Centre, which in 2011 turned a community center) and provisory infrastructures for the Big Air. Another changes is about the no use of Cypress Mountain (due environmental issues), whose events would be moved to the Sun Peaks Resort in Kamloops and the use of BC Place, that will be an exclusive venue to the opening and closing ceremonies. A new and provisory Medals Plaza is planned to be at the Hastings Park. This venue is planned to host the Paralympics Closing Ceremonies in place of Whistler Medal Plaza. Three or four New Olympic Villages would be constructed on First Nations-owned lands and after the Games will turn a low-cost and quality housing for these communities and they will be built with the goal of a 'climate-positive' outcome - leaving the natural environment in a better state than before the Games.

In October 2022, the BC Government decided to not support the bid, citing high costs. The bid is over according to Chief Jen Thomas of the Tsleil-Waututh Nation.
