= Winter Paralympic Games =

International multi-sport event for disabled athletes

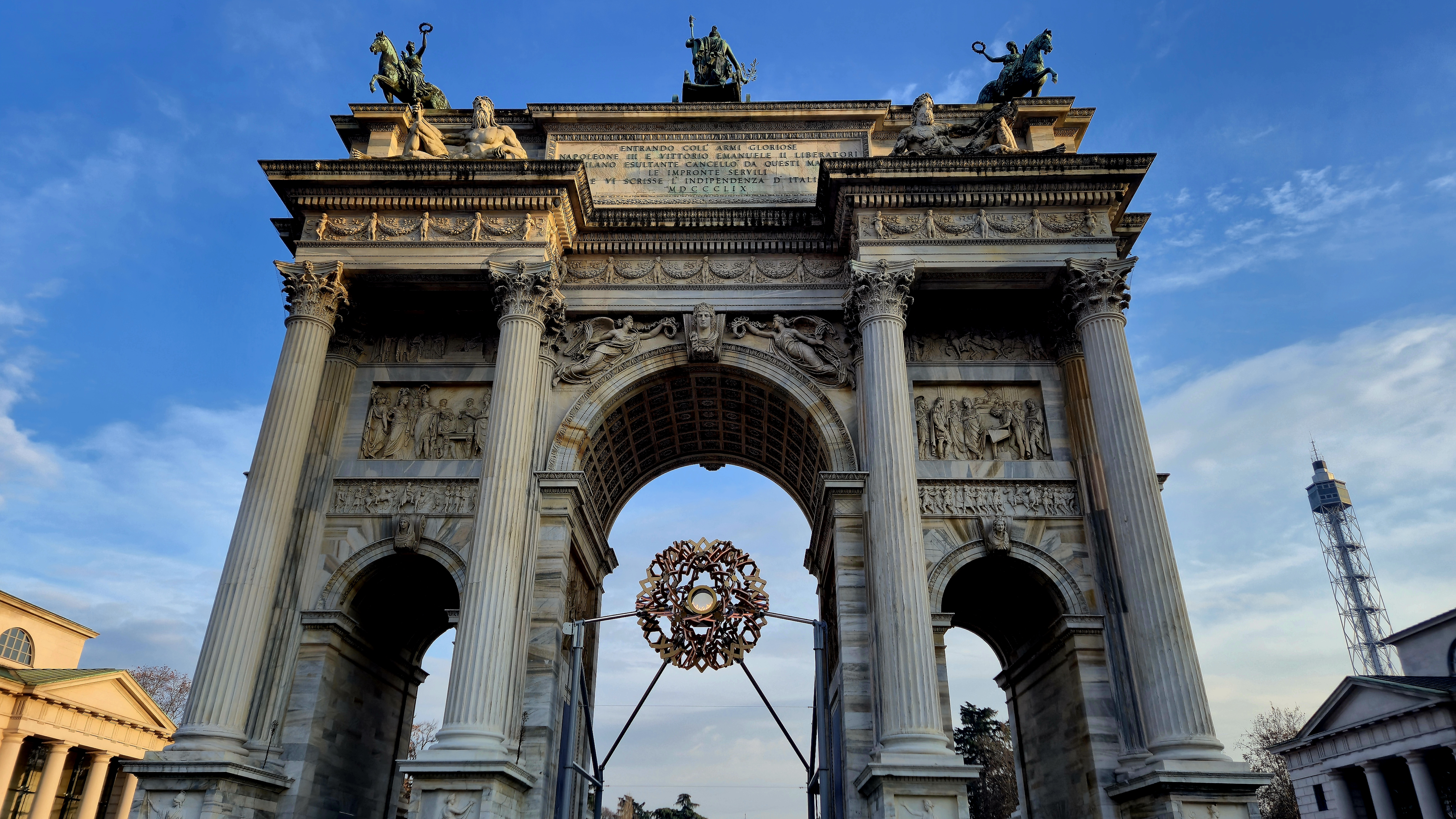
- The Paralympic flame in Milan during the 2026 Winter Paralympics
- 1976; 1980; 1984; 1988; 1992; 1994; 1998; 2002; 2006; 2010; 2014; 2018; 2022; 2026
- Alpine skiing; Biathlon; Cross‑country skiing; Ice sledge hockey; Para snowboard; Wheelchair curling

The Paralympic Winter Games are an international multi-sport event featuring winter Para athletes with physical and vision impairments who are representing their National Paralympic Committee (NPC) to compete in snow and ice Para sports.

The Paralympic Winter Games are held every four years a matter of days following the conclusion of the Winter Olympic Games and (since 1992) hosted in the same city.

Eligible impairments for the Paralympic Winter Games include physical impairments (impaired muscle power, range of movement, limb deficiency, leg length difference, hypertonia, ataxia, athetosis) and vision impairment.

The International Paralympic Committee (IPC) oversees the delivery of the Games. Medals are awarded in each event: with gold for first place, silver for second, and bronze for third, following the tradition that the Olympic Games began in 1904.

The Winter Paralympics began in 1976 in Örnsköldsvik, Sweden, with 198 Para athletes from 16 countries taking part. Those Games were the first Paralympics that featured athletes other than those in wheelchairs. Since 1976 the Games have grown in size and stature. Multiple records were broken at the Milano Cortina 2026 Paralympic Winter Games which marked the 50th anniversary of the first Games. A record number of athletes and countries took part while more countries won medals than any previous Winter Games. In addition more broadcasters than ever before covered the event, beaming TV pictures around the world.

As the Games have grown the list of eligible impairments has increased..

Norway has been the top-ranking (medals) nation for four Paralympic Winter Games: 1980, 1988, 1994, and 1998. Germany has been the top-ranking (medals) for three Paralympic Winter Games: 1976, 2002, and 2010. China (2022 and 2026), Russia (2006 and 2014) and the United States (1992 and 2018) have been the top-ranking nation two times each. Austria (1984) has been the top-ranking nation one time.

== History ==
The origins of the Winter Paralympics are much similar to the Summer Paralympics. Injured soldiers returning from World War II sought sports as an avenue to healing. Organized by Dr. Ludwig Guttmann, sports competitions between British convalescent hospitals began in 1948 and continued until 1960 when a parallel Olympics was held in Rome after the 1960 Summer Olympics. Over 400 wheelchair athletes competed at the 1960 Paralympic Games, which became known as the first Paralympics.

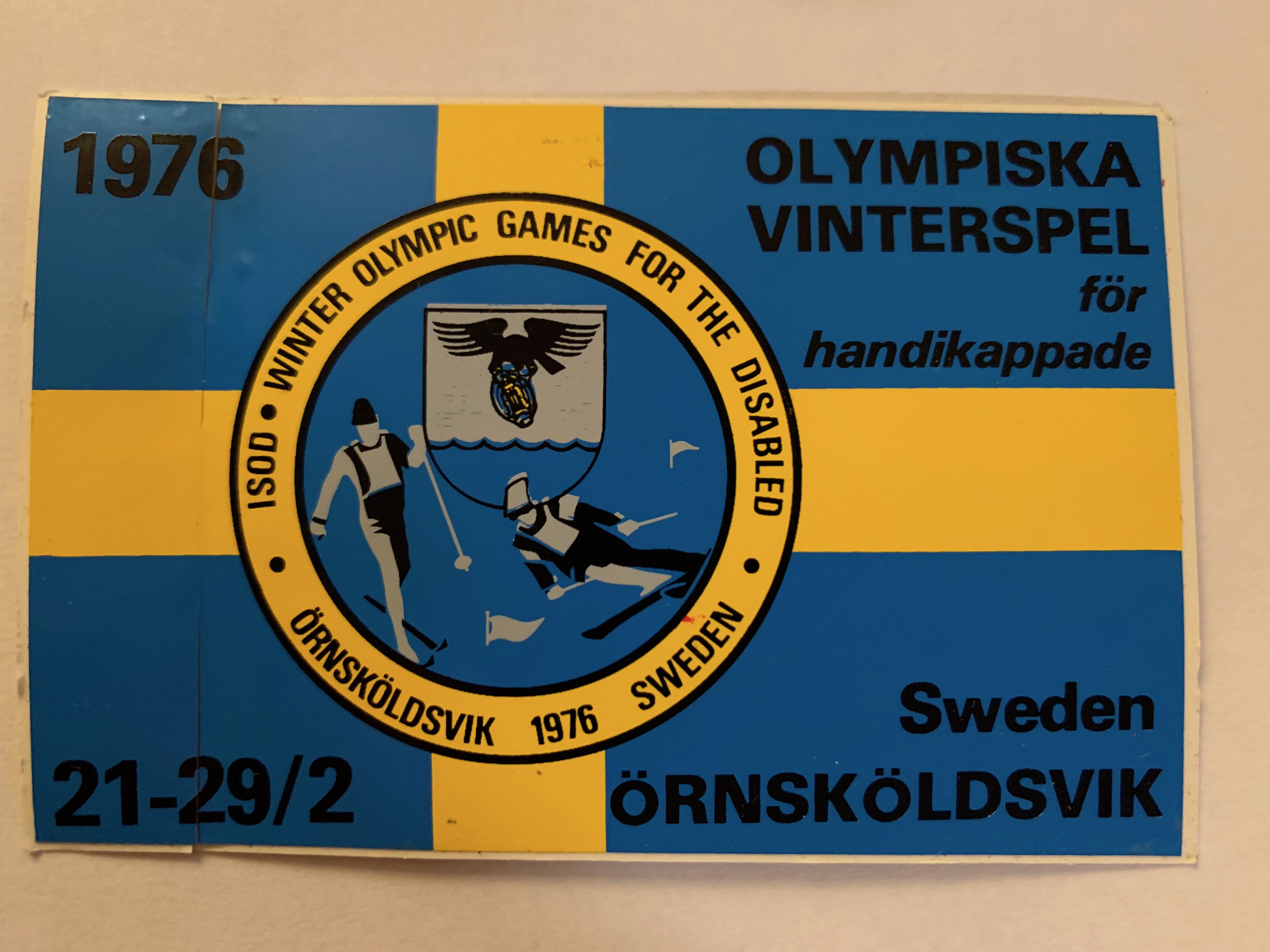
Official sticker from the first Winter Paralympics held in Örnsköldsvik, Sweden, 1976

Sepp Zwicknagl, a pioneer of snow sports for disabled athletes, was a double-leg amputee Austrian skier who experimented skiing using prosthetics. His work helped pioneer technological advances for people with disabilities who wished to participate in winter sports. Advances were slow, and it was not until 1974 that the first official world ski competition for physically impaired athletes, featuring downhill and a cross-country skiing, was held. The first Winter Paralympics were held in 1976 at Örnsköldsvik, Sweden from February 21–28. Patra alpine and Para Nordic skiing for amputees and visually impaired athletes were the main events but ice sledge racing was included as a demonstration event. There were 198 participating athletes from 16 countries, and it was the first time that athletes with impairments other than wheelchair athletes were permitted to compete.

Starting in 1988 the Summer Paralympics were held in the same host city as the Summer Olympic Games. This was due to an agreement reached between the International Olympic Committee (IOC) and the International Paralympic Committee (IPC). The 1992 Winter Paralympics were the first Winter Games to use the same facilities as the Winter Olympics.

Sportspeople with intellectual disabilities competed at the Winter Paralympics for the first time in 1992 in Para alpine skiing and Para cross country skiing. These were demonstration events. For the 1994 Winter Paralympics, Para biathlon was added as a demonstration sport. Athletes with intellectual disabilities have not competed at a Winter Paralympics since 1998.

== Cheating ==
German skier Thomas Oelsner became the first Winter Paralympian to test positive for steroids in 2002. He had won two gold medals in the Para alpine skiing events but was stripped of his medals.

International Paralympic Committee (IPC) found evidence that the Disappearing Positive Methodology was in operation at the 2014 Winter Paralympics in Sochi. On 7 August 2016, the IPC's Governing Board voted unanimously to ban the entire Russian team from the 2016 Summer Paralympics, citing the Russian Paralympic Committee's inability to enforce the IPC's Anti-Doping Code and the World Anti-Doping Code which is "a fundamental constitutional requirement". IPC President Sir Philip Craven stated that the Russian government had "catastrophically failed its Para athletes". IPC Athletes' Council Chairperson Todd Nicholson said that Russia had used athletes as "pawns" in order to "show global prowess".

== Disability categories ==
The IPC has established six disability categories applying to both the Summer and Winter Paralympics. Athletes with one of these physical disabilities are able to compete in the Paralympics, though not every sport can allow for every disability category.

- Amputee: Athletes with a partial or total loss of at least one limb.
- Cerebral Palsy: Athletes with non-progressive brain damage, for example cerebral palsy, traumatic brain injury, stroke or similar disabilities affecting muscle control, balance or coordination.
- Intellectual Disability: Athletes with a significant impairment in intellectual functioning and associated limitations in adaptive behavior.
- Wheelchair: Athletes with spinal cord injuries and other disabilities which require them to compete in a wheelchair.
- Visually Impaired: Athletes with vision impairment ranging from partial vision, sufficient to be judged legally blind, to total blindness.
- Les Autres: Athletes with a physical disability that does not fall strictly under one of the other five categories, such as dwarfism, multiple sclerosis or congenital deformities of the limbs such as that caused by thalidomide (the name for this category is French for "the others").

== Classifications ==
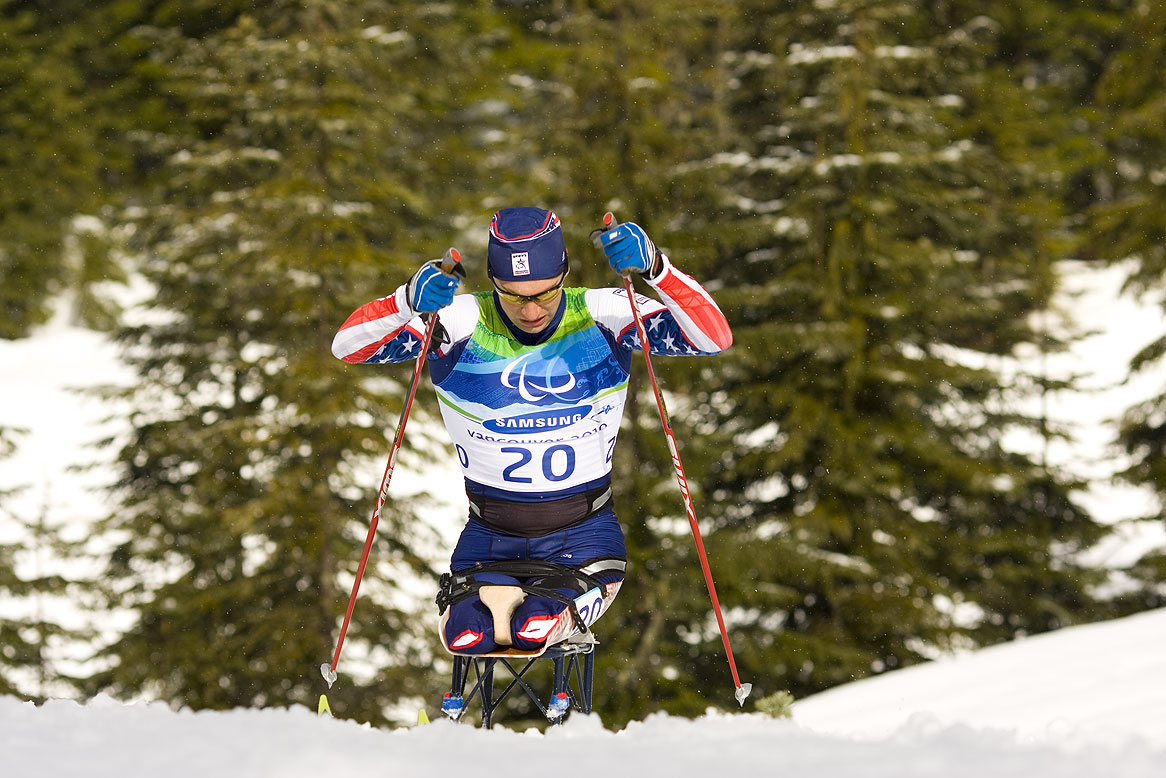
Paralympian Andy Soule in the 12.5 km cross-country race at the 2010 Winter Olympics

Within the six disability categories the athletes still need to be divided according to their level of impairment. The classification systems differ from sport to sport. The systems are designed to open up Paralympic sports to as many athletes as possible, who can participate in fair competitions against athletes with similar levels of ability. The closest equivalents in non-disabled competitions are age classifications in junior sports, and weight divisions in wrestling, boxing, and weightlifting. Classifications vary in accordance with the different skills required to perform the sport. The biggest challenge in the classification system is how to account for the wide variety and severity of disabilities. As a result, there will always be a range of impairment within a classification. What follows is a list of the Winter Paralympic sports and a general description of how they are classified.

Alpine skiing: There are five events in alpine skiing: downhill, super-G, giant slalom, slalom and super combined. Alpine skiing accommodates athletes with the following physical limitations: amputation, cerebral palsy, Les Autres, spinal injury, and visual impairment. There are eleven classifications, seven for standing athletes, three for sitting athletes, and three for visually impaired athletes. The divisions are defined by the degree of the athletes' function and the need for assistive equipment (prosthesis, ski poles, etc.). Snowboard cross was included in this sport when it was introduced in 2014 but snowboard is now considered a separate sport.

Biathlon: Biathlon is a combination of cross-country skiing with target shooting. It requires physical stamina and accurate shooting. The events are open to athletes with physical disabilities and visual impairments. There are fifteen classes in which athletes will be placed depending on their level of function. Twelve divisions are for athletes with a physical impairment and three divisions are for athletes with a visual impairment. The athletes compete together, and their finishing times are entered into a formula with their disability class to determine the athletes' overall finish order. Visually impaired athletes are able to compete through the use of acoustic signals. The signal intensity varies depending upon whether or not the athlete is on target.

Cross-country skiing: Cross-country skiing, also considered a discipline of Nordic skiing, is open to athletes with cerebral palsy, amputations, the need for a wheelchair and visual impairment. There are fifteen classifications, three for visually impaired athletes, nine for standing athletes and three for seated athletes. The divisions are determined in a similar fashion to alpine skiing with attention given to the athletes' level of function and need for assistive devices.

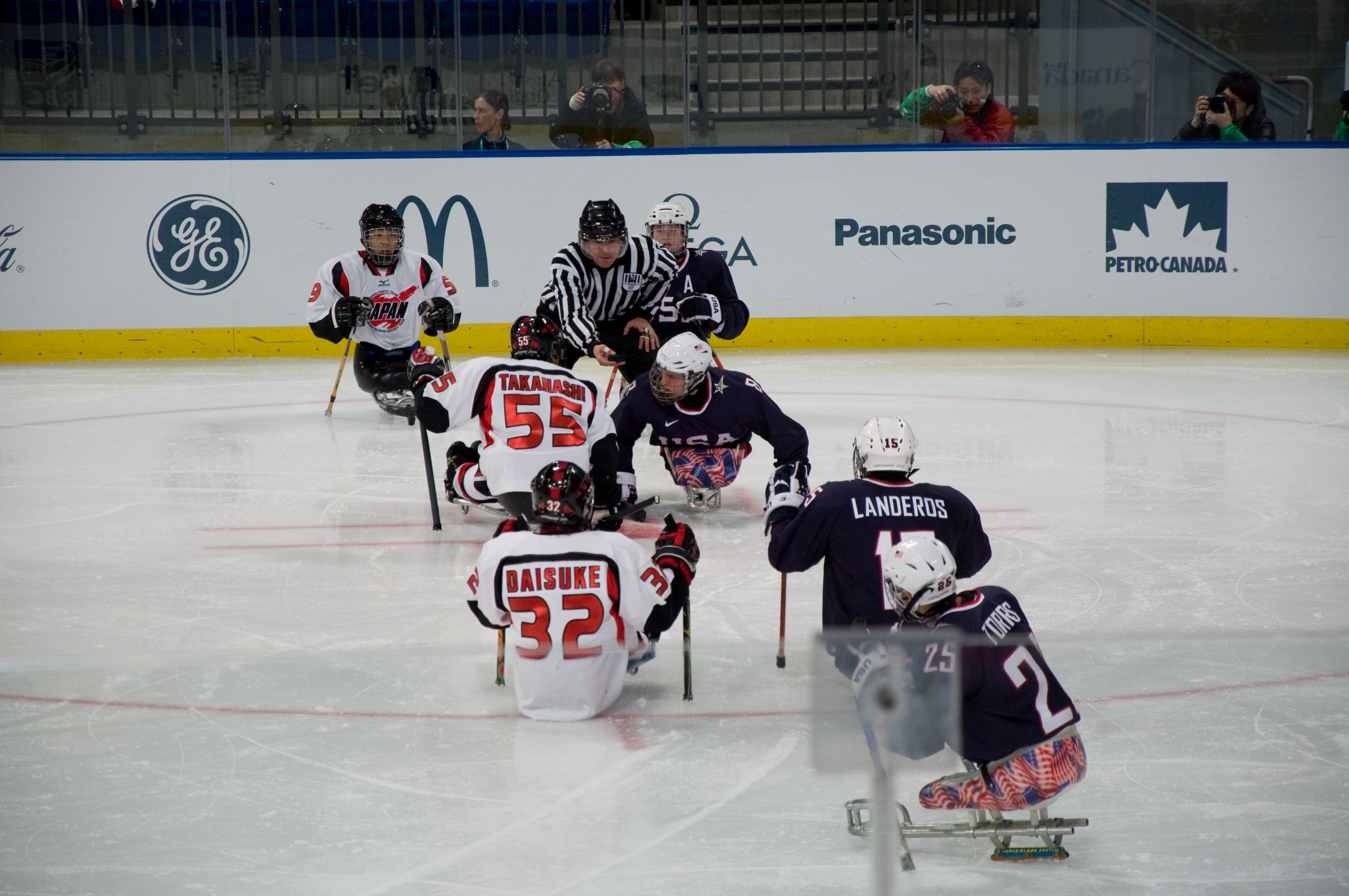
Ice sledge hockey game at the 2010 Winter Paralympics

Ice hockey: Para ice hockey (known as ice sledge hockey until 2016) is open only to competitors with a physical disability in the lower part of their body. Since 2010 it has been a mixed-gender sport at the Winter Paralympics, however participation of female athletes remains low The game is played using international ice hockey rules with some modifications. Athletes sit on sledges with two blades that allow the puck to go beneath the sledge. They also use two sticks, which have a spike-end for pushing and a blade-end for shooting. The athletes are classified into three groups: group 1 is for athletes with no sitting balance or with major impairment in both upper and lower limbs, group 2 is for athletes with some sitting balance and moderate impairment in their extremities and athletes in group 3 have good balance and mild impairment in their upper and lower limbs.

Snowboard: On 2 May 2012, the International Paralympic Committee (IPC) officially sanctioned para snowboard (formerly known as adaptive snowboarding) as a medal event in the 2014 Winter Paralympic Games under Alpine Skiing. There were men's and women's standing snowboard cross competitions. The sport's Paralympic debut featured events for only athletes with overall lower-limb impairments. Athletes with amputations were permitted to wear a prosthesis. The events were held in a time trial format, but no accommodation was made based on an athlete's level of impairment. At the 2018 Winter Paralympics, snowboard was designated as a separate sport and the number of events increased from 2 to 10 with the split of the lower limb classifications into two sub-groups (LL-1 for greater impairment and LL-2 for lesser impairment), and the addition of the banked slalom. The snowboard cross event was run in a head-to-head format with multiple knockout heats to determine the medal winners. In 2022, events for athletes with upper-limb impairments were added, but the IPC eliminated the LL-1 category for women due to a dearth of athletes in that class. Those athletes were initially barred from competing at all until Brenna Huckaby of the United States prevailed in a lawsuit to "compete up" against the LL-2 class.

Wheelchair curling: Wheelchair curling is a coed team event for athletes with permanent lower limb disabilities that require them to use a wheelchair in their daily lives. Athletes with cerebral palsy or multiple sclerosis can also play if they use a wheelchair. Delivery of the stone can be by hand release or the use of a pole. There are no classifications in this event except the requirement that all athletes participating must have need for a wheelchair for daily mobility.

== List of Paralympic sports ==
A number of different sports have been part of the Paralympic program at one point or another.

This color indicates a discontinued sport

Sport	Years
Ice sledge racing	1980–1988, 1994–1998
Para alpine skiing	1976–present
Para biathlon	since 1988
Para cross-country skiing	1976–present
Para ice hockey	since 1994
Para snowboard	since 2014
Wheelchair curling	since 2006

== All-time medal table ==
According to official data of the International Paralympic Committee. This table lists the top 20 nations, as ranked by number of golds, then silvers, then bronzes.

=== Winter Paralympics (1976–2026) ===
World map showing nations that have won Winter Paralympic medals, as of completion of the 2026 Winter Paralympics Legend: represents countries that won at least one gold medal. represents countries that won at least one silver medal but no gold medals. represents countries that won at least one bronze medal (no gold or silver). represents participating countries that did not win medals. countries that never participated at the Winter Paralympics

No.	Nation	Games	Gold	Silver	Bronze	Total
1	Norway (NOR)	14	142	112	88	342
2	United States (USA)	14	130	135	92	357
3	Austria (AUT)	14	116	122	120	358
4	Germany (GER)	10	111	93	87	291
5	Russia (RUS)	7	91	88	63	242
6	Finland (FIN)	14	80	52	61	193
7	France (FRA)	14	72	66	65	203
8	Canada (CAN)	14	62	57	84	203
9	Switzerland (SUI)	14	55	57	52	164
10	Ukraine (UKR)	8	41	59	60	160
12	China (CHN)	7	34	33	39	106
11	West Germany (FRG)	4	32	43	35	110
13	Sweden (SWE)	14	31	35	48	114
14	Japan (JPN)	14	27	36	38	101
15	Italy (ITA)	13	23	32	34	89
16	Slovakia (SVK)	9	18	21	25	64
17	Spain (ESP)	12	17	17	13	47
18	New Zealand (NZL)	13	17	8	11	36
19	Australia (AUS)	13	12	7	18	37
20	Poland (POL)	14	11	7	29	47

== List of Winter Paralympic Games ==
1988 Winter Paralympics were the last Paralympics to be held in a separate location from the Olympics. Beginning in 1992, the Olympics and the Paralympics were held in the same city or in an adjacent city.

Non-European host cities of Winter Paralympic Games
European host cities of Winter Paralympic Games

Games	Paralympiad	Host	Opened by	Dates	National Paralympic Committees	Competitors			Sports	Events	Top Nation
Games	Paralympiad	Host	Opened by	Dates	National Paralympic Committees	Total	Men	Women	Sports	Events	Top Nation
Winter Olympic Games for the Disabled
1 / 1st Winter Olympic Games for the Disabled	1976	Örnsköldsvik, Sweden	King Carl XVI Gustaf of Sweden	21–28 February	16	196			2	53	West Germany (FRG)
2 / 2nd Olympic Winter Games for Disabled	1980	Geilo, Norway	King Olav V of Norway	1–7 February	18	299			2	63	Norway (NOR)
3 / 3rd World Winter Games for the Disabled	1984	Innsbruck, Austria	President Rudolf Kirchschläger	14–20 January	21	419			3	107	Austria (AUT)
Winter Paralympic Games
4 / 1	1988	Innsbruck, Austria	President Kurt Waldheim	18–25 January	22	377			4	97	Norway (NOR)
5 / 2	1992	Tignes and Albertville, France	President François Mitterrand	25 March – 1 April	24	365	288	77	3	78	United States (USA)
6 / 3	1994	Lillehammer, Norway	Queen Sonja	10–19 March	31	471			5	133	Norway (NOR)
7 / 4	1998	Nagano, Japan	Crown Prince Naruhito	5–14 March	32	571			5	122	Norway (NOR)
8 / 5	2002	Salt Lake City, United States	President George W. Bush	7–16 March	36	416			4	92	Germany (GER)
9 / 6	2006	Turin, Italy	President Carlo Azeglio Ciampi	10–19 March	39	486			5	58	Russia (RUS)
10 / 7	2010	Vancouver, Canada	Governor General Michaëlle Jean	12–21 March	44	506			5	64	Germany (GER)
11 / 8	2014	Sochi, Russia	President Vladimir Putin	7–16 March	45	550			6	72	Russia (RUS)
12 / 9	2018	Pyeongchang, South Korea	President Moon Jae-in	9–18 March	49	569			6	80	United States (USA)
13 / 10	2022	Beijing, China	President Xi Jinping	4–13 March	46	564			6	78	China (CHN)
14 / 11	2026	Milan and Cortina d'Ampezzo, Italy	President Sergio Mattarella	6–15 March	55	611			6	79	China (CHN)
15 / 12	2030	Alps, France		1–10 March					6		
16 / 13	2034	Utah, United States		10–19 March							

== See also ==
- Summer Paralympic Games
