= Technological changes at the Paralympic Games =

Technological changes at the Paralympic Games have had major impacts on the types of sports that are played and how those sports are played. Assistive technology in sports can be “low-tech” or can be highly advanced. Over the past decades technology at the Paralympic Games has become more specialised; with the development of tailored technologies and equipment to individual athletes and uses.

== Archery ==
Para-archery is one of the original competitions that has been run since the original Paralympic games in 1960. It is open to athletes who have physical impairments who use assistive devices which are allowed under the classification rules. Some adaptations that are allowed are:

- Mechanical releases on the bow,
- Mouth slings, tabs or mounts for people with restricted arm movement,
- An assistant to relay information about position of arrows on target or to help nock the arrow to the bow,
- Strapping to support the body onto the wheelchair,
- Sight aids,
- Prosthesis with specialised attachments,
- Wheelchairs with additional back support.
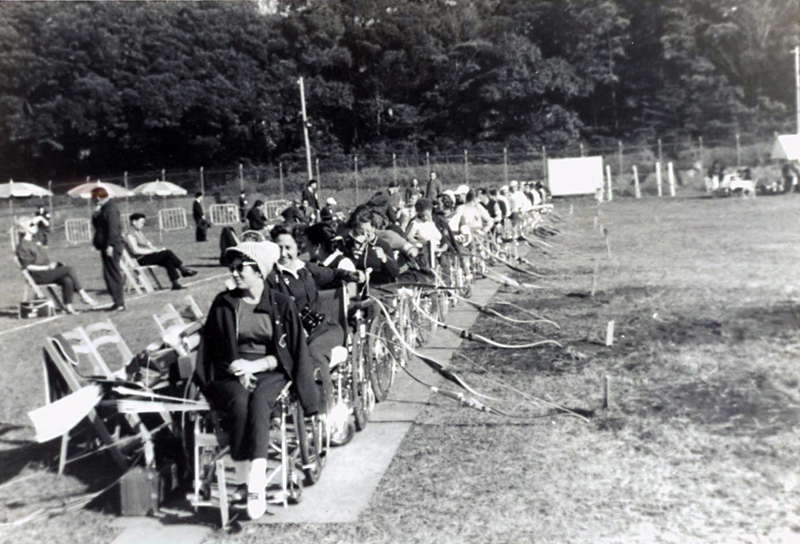
Xx1164 - Daphne Ceeney at archery Tokyo Games - 3a - Scan

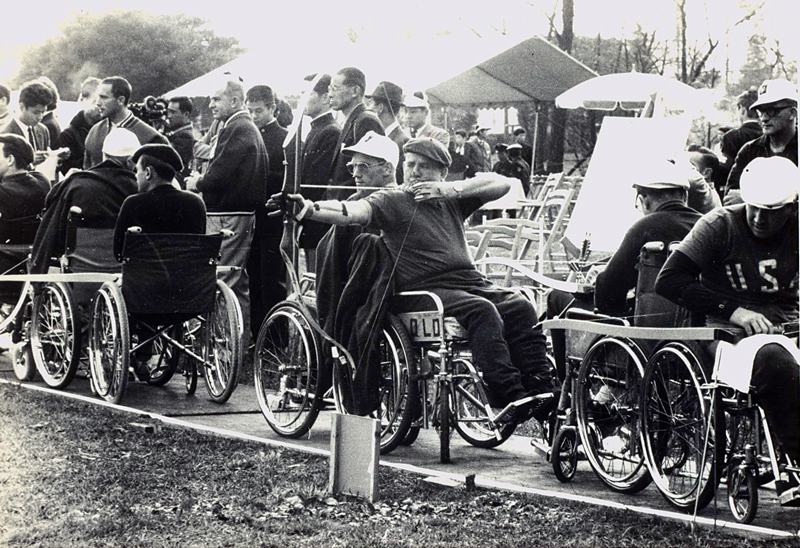
Xx1164 - Roy Fowler at archery Tokyo Games - 3a - Scan

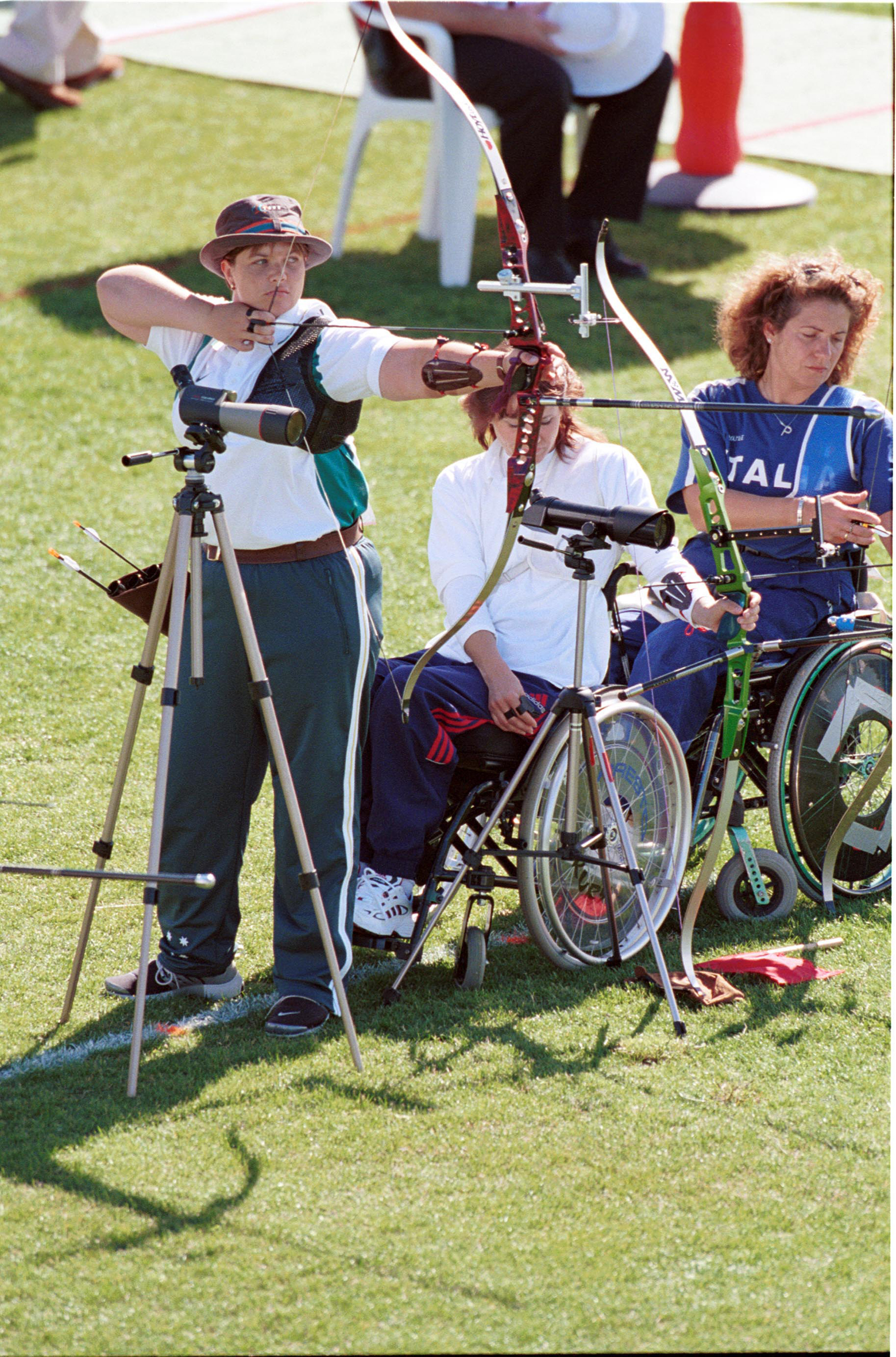
211000 - Archery Natalie Cordowiner shoots 3 - 3b - Sydney 2000 match photo

== Cycling ==
Visually impaired athletes use the same type of equipment to able bodied athletes in a tandem format. There are a large range of prosthesis which allow for disabled athletes to participate in cycling. These include leg and arm prosthesis to allow for athletes to use the same types of bikes that able bodied athletes use. Prosthesis used for cycling are often very expensive and are manufactured from materials such as Carbon fiber. New materials and methods such as 3D printing are being investigated in the aim to reduce the cost of prosthesis and to improve comfort for athletes.

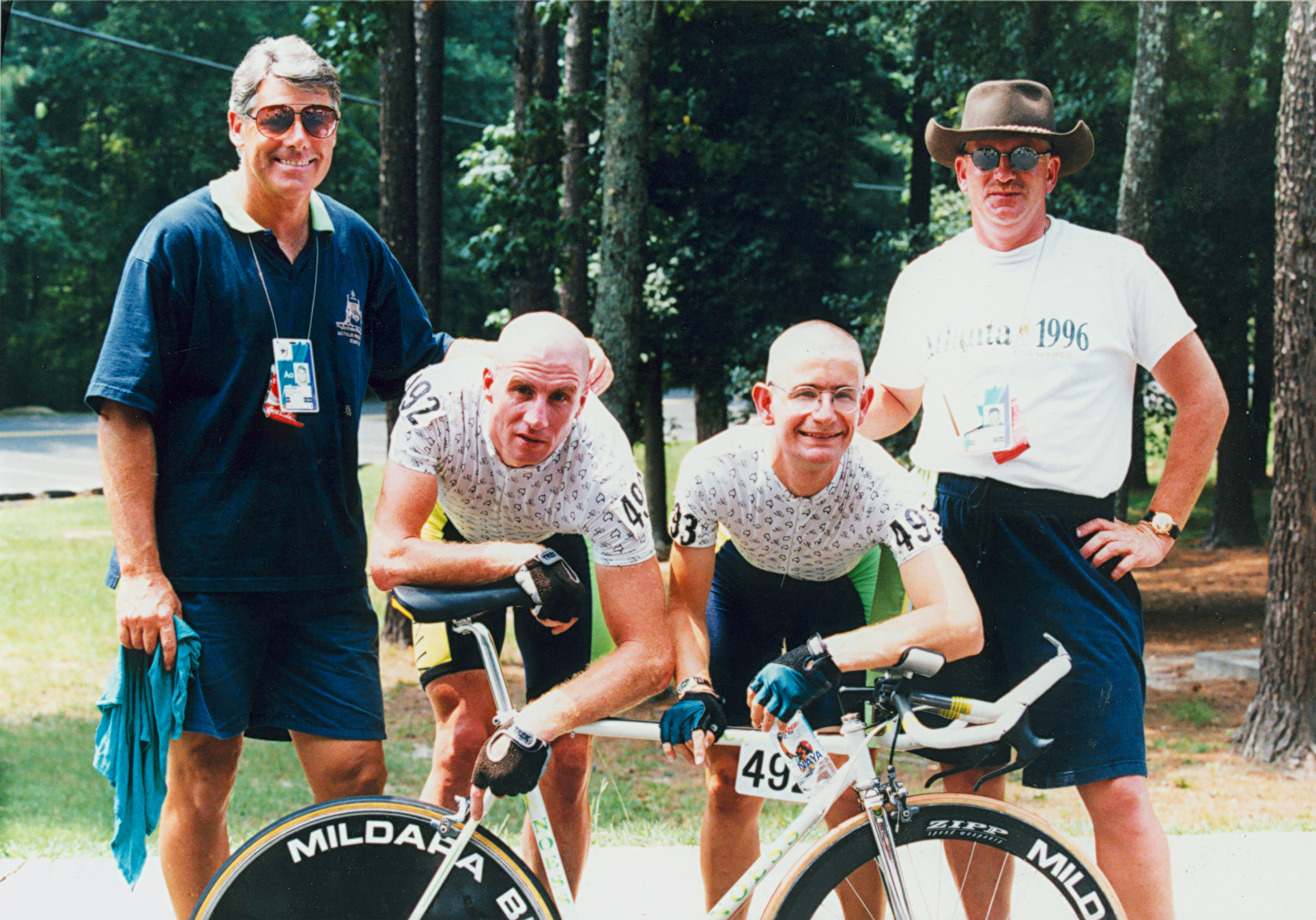
Australian Cycling Team in Atlanta 1996 Paralympic Games

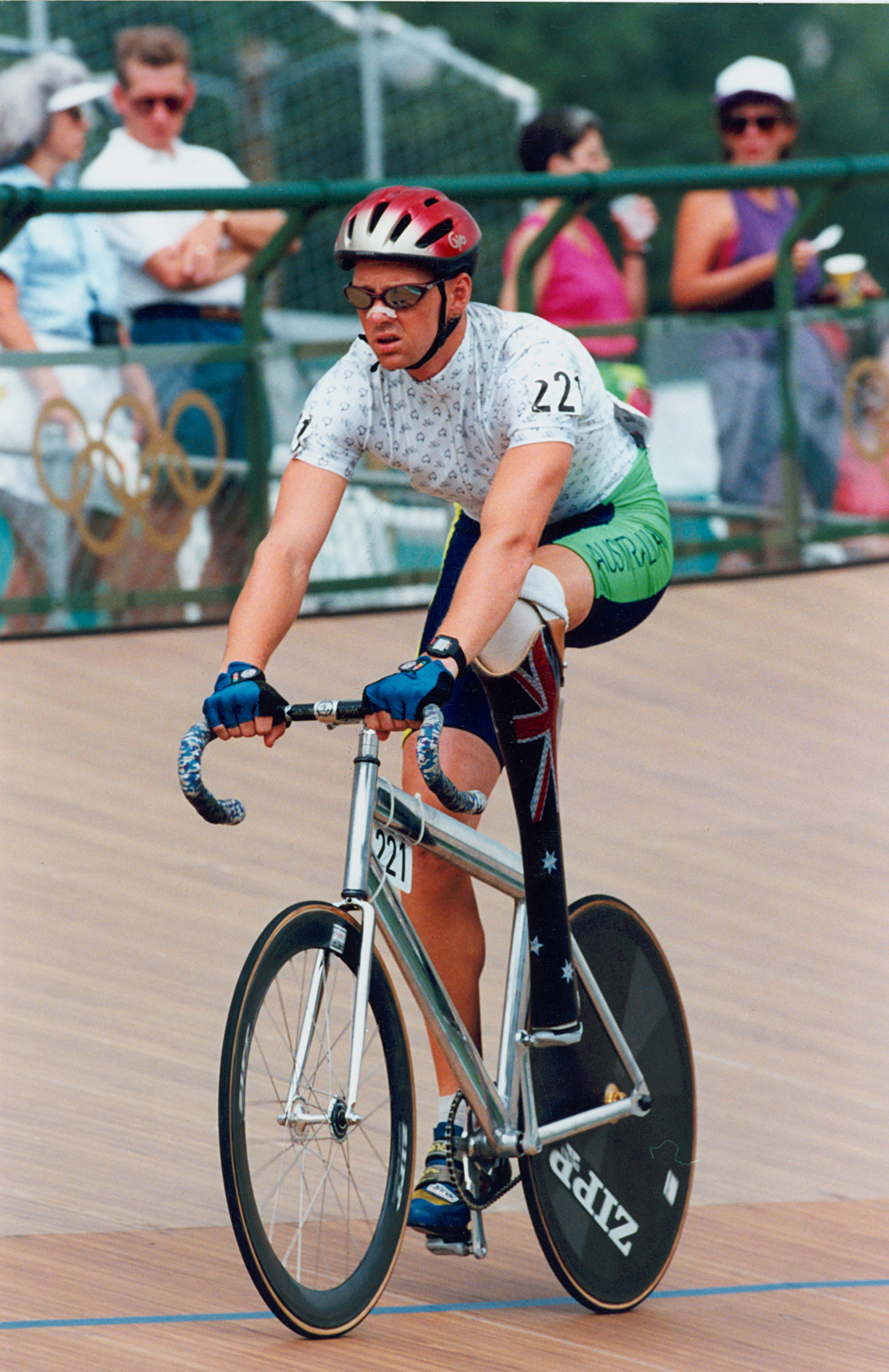
75 ACPS Atlanta 1996 Cycling Paul Lake

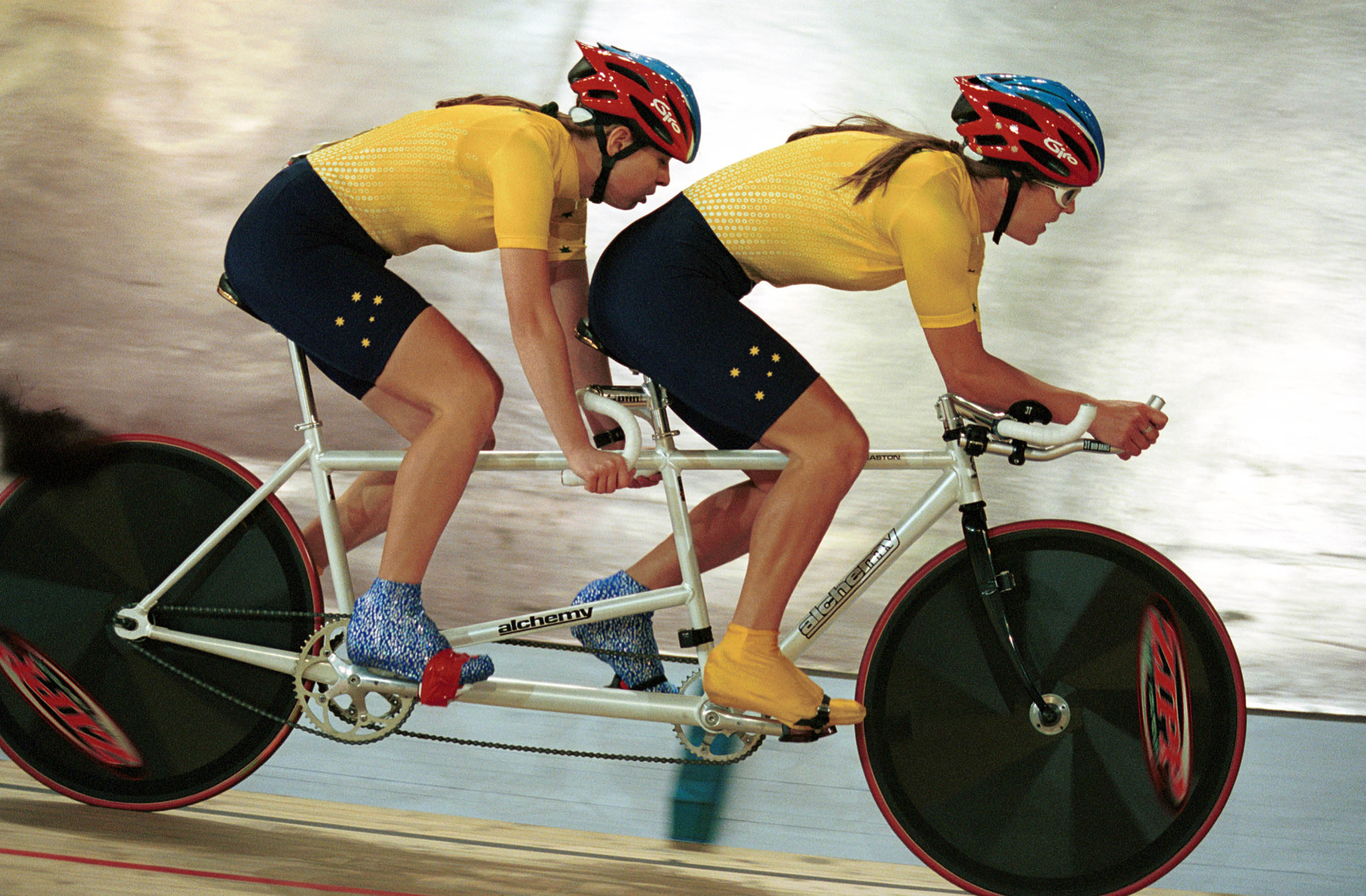
221000 - Cycling track Tania Modra Sarnya Parker action - 3b - 2000 Sydney race photo

== Hand cycling ==
Hand cycles initially developed due to a desire by people with impairments to participate in sports alongside non-disabled athletes. The Paralympic Games allow the use of two types of hand cycles, these are recumbent and kneeling hand cycles. Racing hand cycles often have many gears, which can range from 1 to 33. The construction of hand cycles often consists of materials such as aluminium, titanium and carbon fibre.

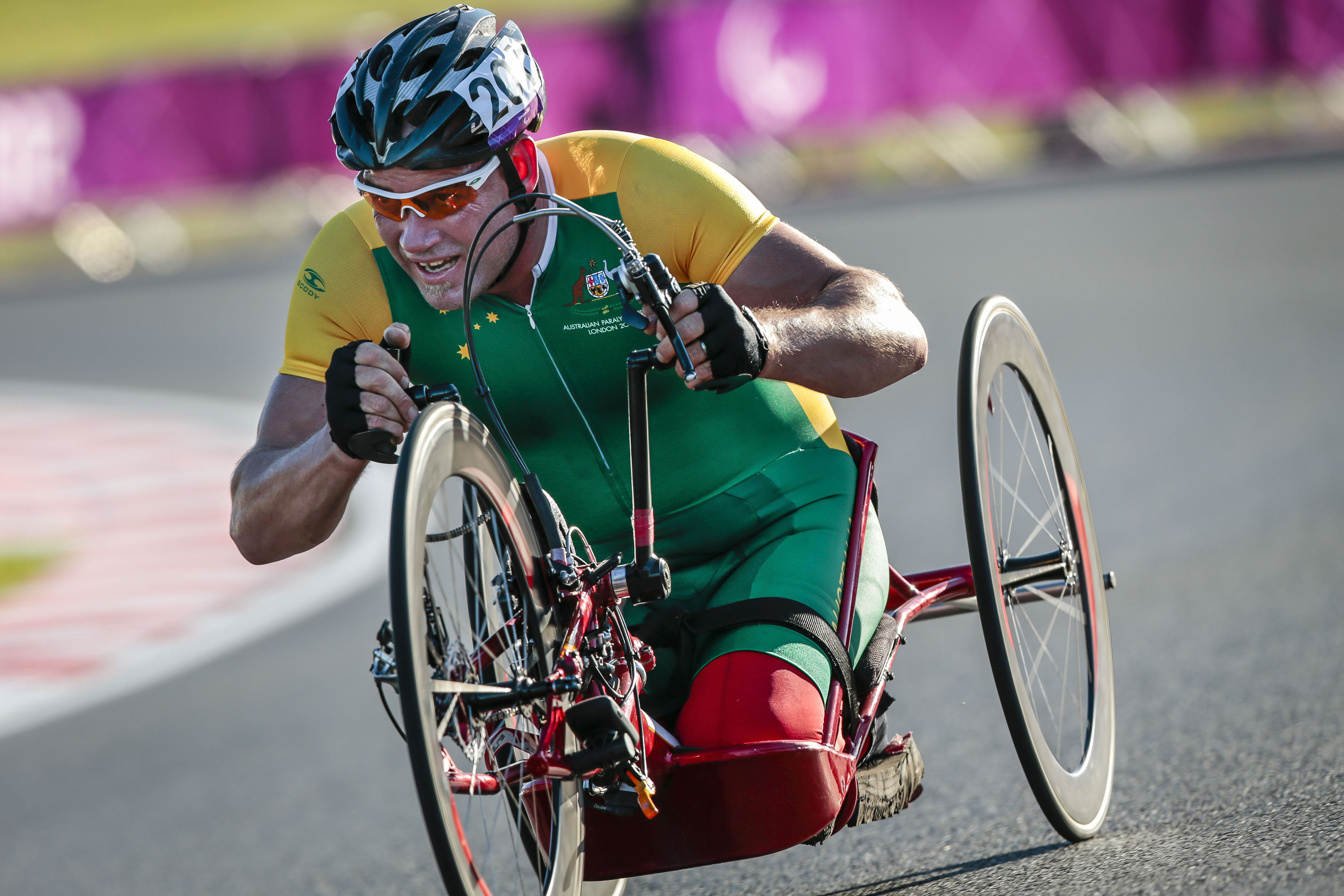
080912 - Stuart Tripp - 3b - 2012 Summer Paralympics

U.S. Navy Yeoman 1st Class Javier Rodriguez Santiago, assigned to the Transient Personnel Unit office at Joint Base Pearl Harbor-Hickam, Hawaii, rolls to the finish line in ninth place with a time of 26-39 130512-N-DT940-122

== Wheelchair basketball ==
Wheelchair basketball is an adaptation of the able-bodied version. Since the beginning of wheelchair basketball in 1946 there have been significant changes in wheelchair technology. Modern wheelchairs used in wheelchair basketball have highly cambered wheels (to prevent injury to players hands). There have also been the addition of rear castor wheels to prevent falling backwards, and high tech materials such as carbon fibre and titanium are being used in the seats, frames and spokes

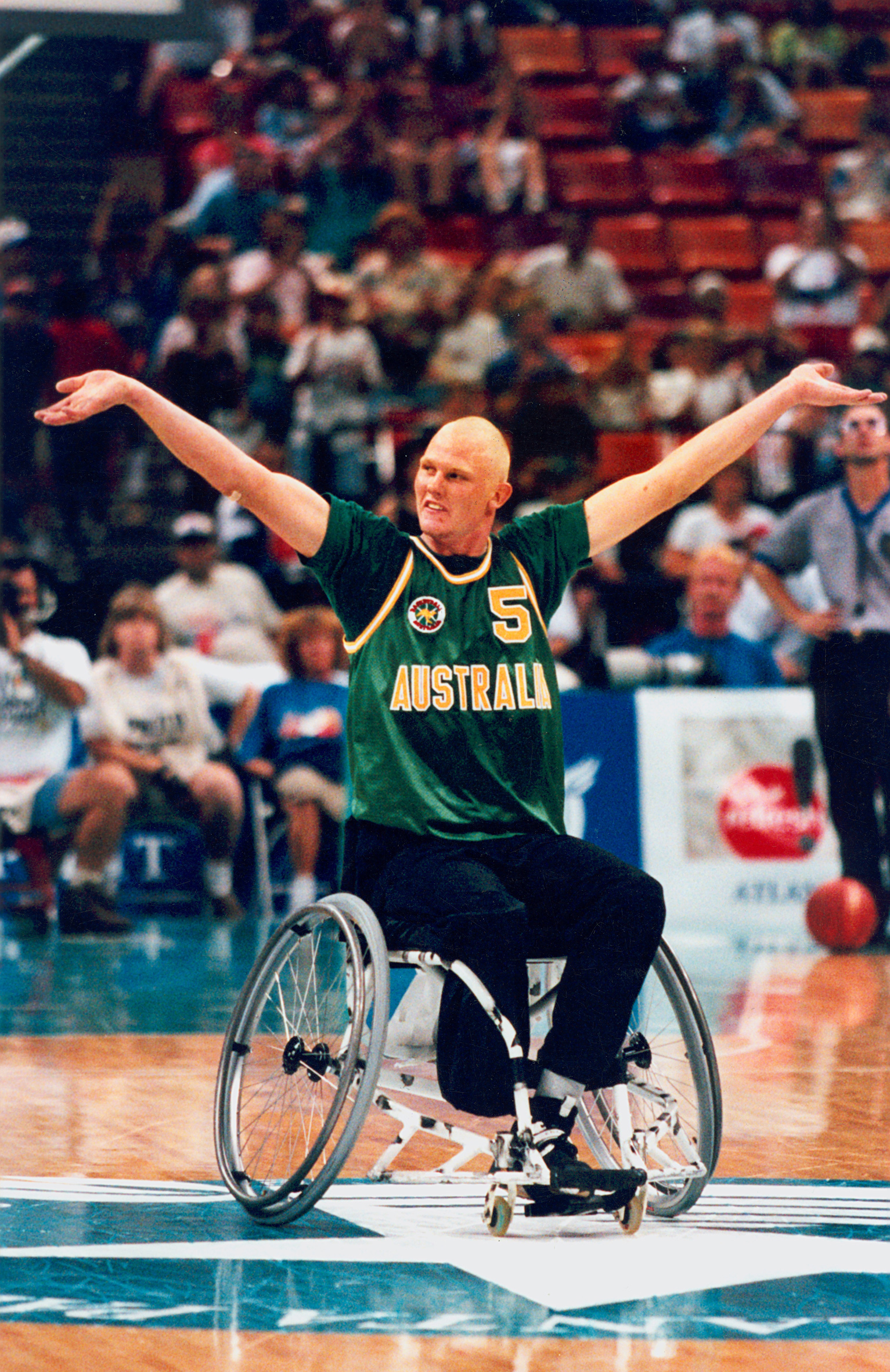
41 ACPS Atlanta 1996 Basketball Troy Sachs

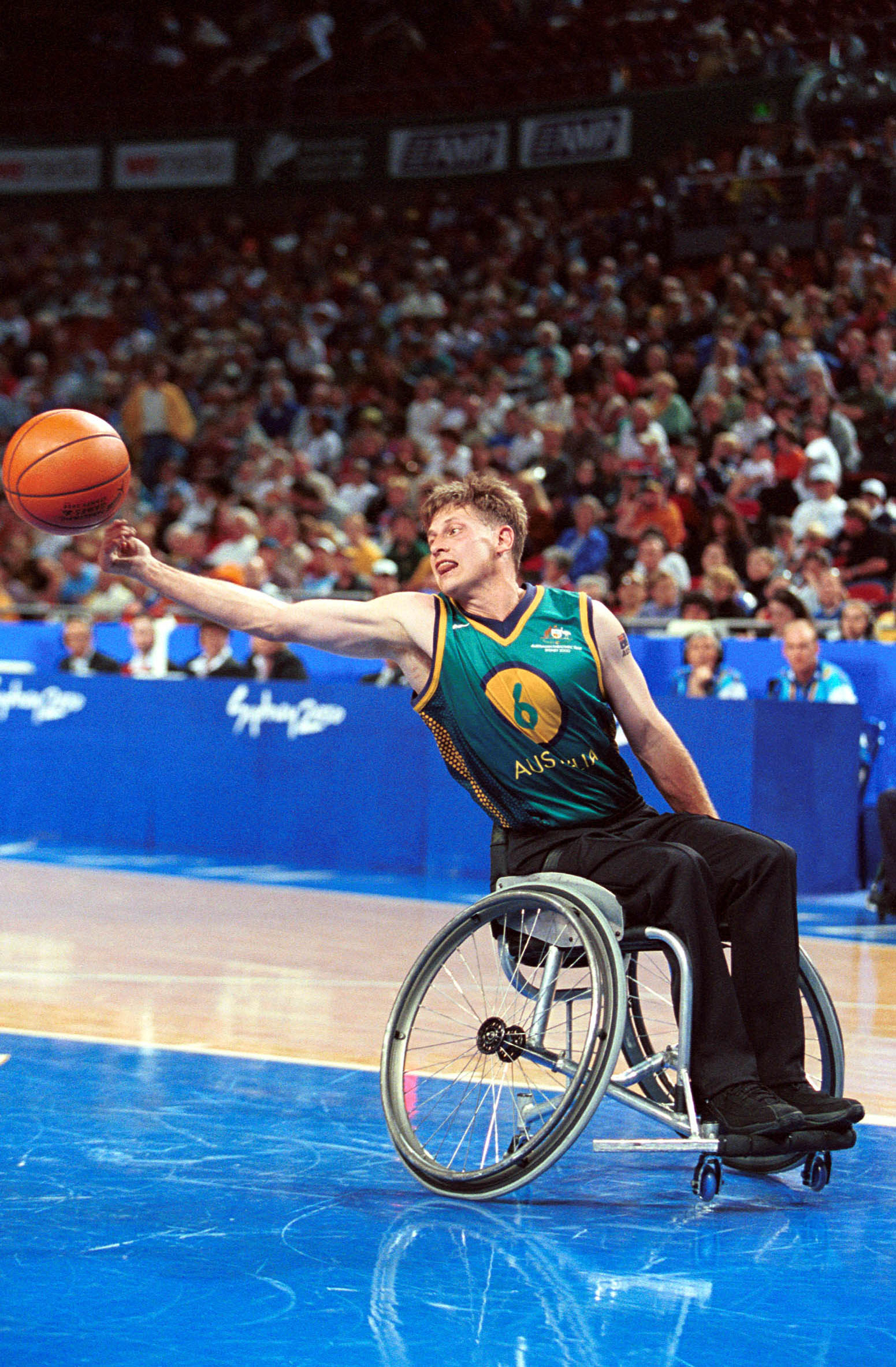
201000 - Wheelchair basketball David Gould reaches - 3b - 2000 Sydney match photo

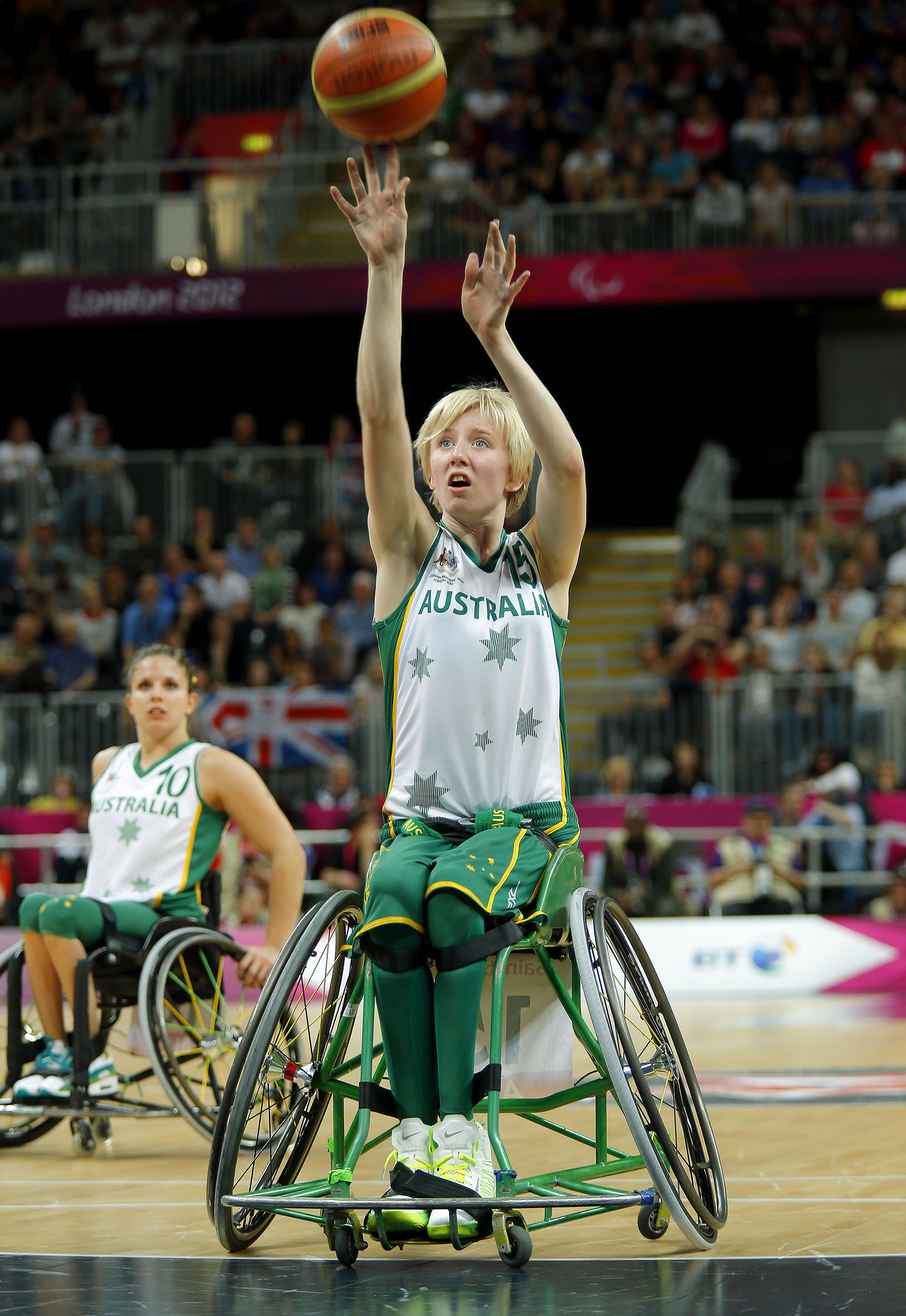
020912 - Amber Merritt - 3b - 2012 Summer Paralympics

== Wheelchair rugby ==
Wheelchair rugby is played by athletes with quadriplegia who was played as a demonstration sport at the 1996 Atlanta Paralympic Games. Wheelchairs made its debut as a medal sport at the 2000 Sydney Paralympic games. These wheelchairs have these following characteristics, they have:

- A higher back for trunk control,
- A greater degree of dump (seat angle) to stop the player from falling forward. The angle also helps the player carry the ball in their lap,
- Metal shroud covering spokes,
- Forward metal protection for contact,
- High wheel camber to prevent injury to player’s hands.

The wheels used between the 1996 and 2000 Paralympic Games were considerably different in their construction. With wheelchairs used in the 1996 Paralympic Games having a greater resemblance to the wheelchairs used in wheelchair basketball. Wheelchairs designs also allow for specialisations between defensive and offensive positions; these consist mainly of added components. Offensive chairs often have shrouds to make it harder for opponents to impede them and the design of defensive chairs allow for bumpers which are intended to impede the opposition.

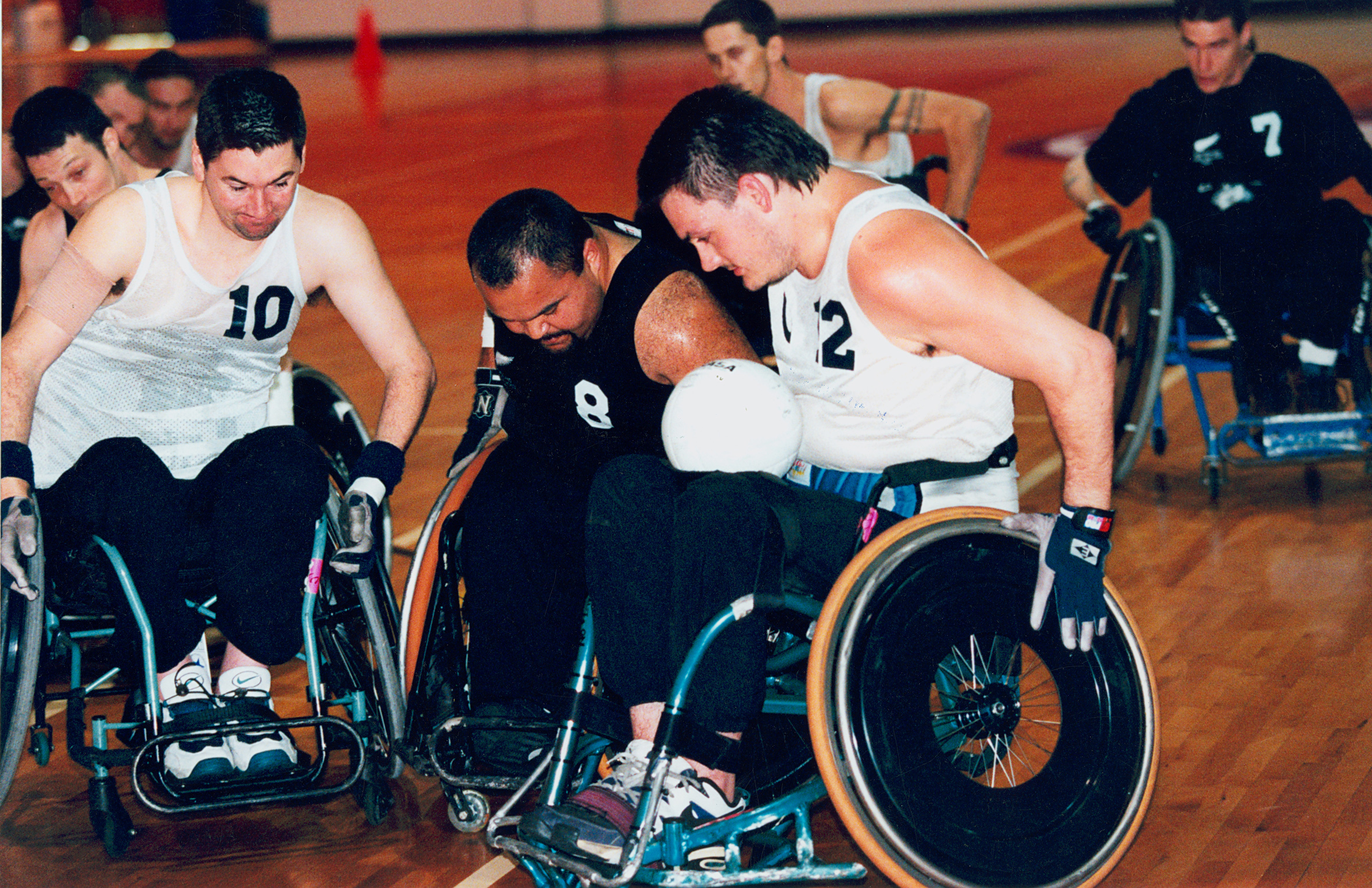
53 ACPS Atlanta 1996 Rugby Steve Porter Garry Croker

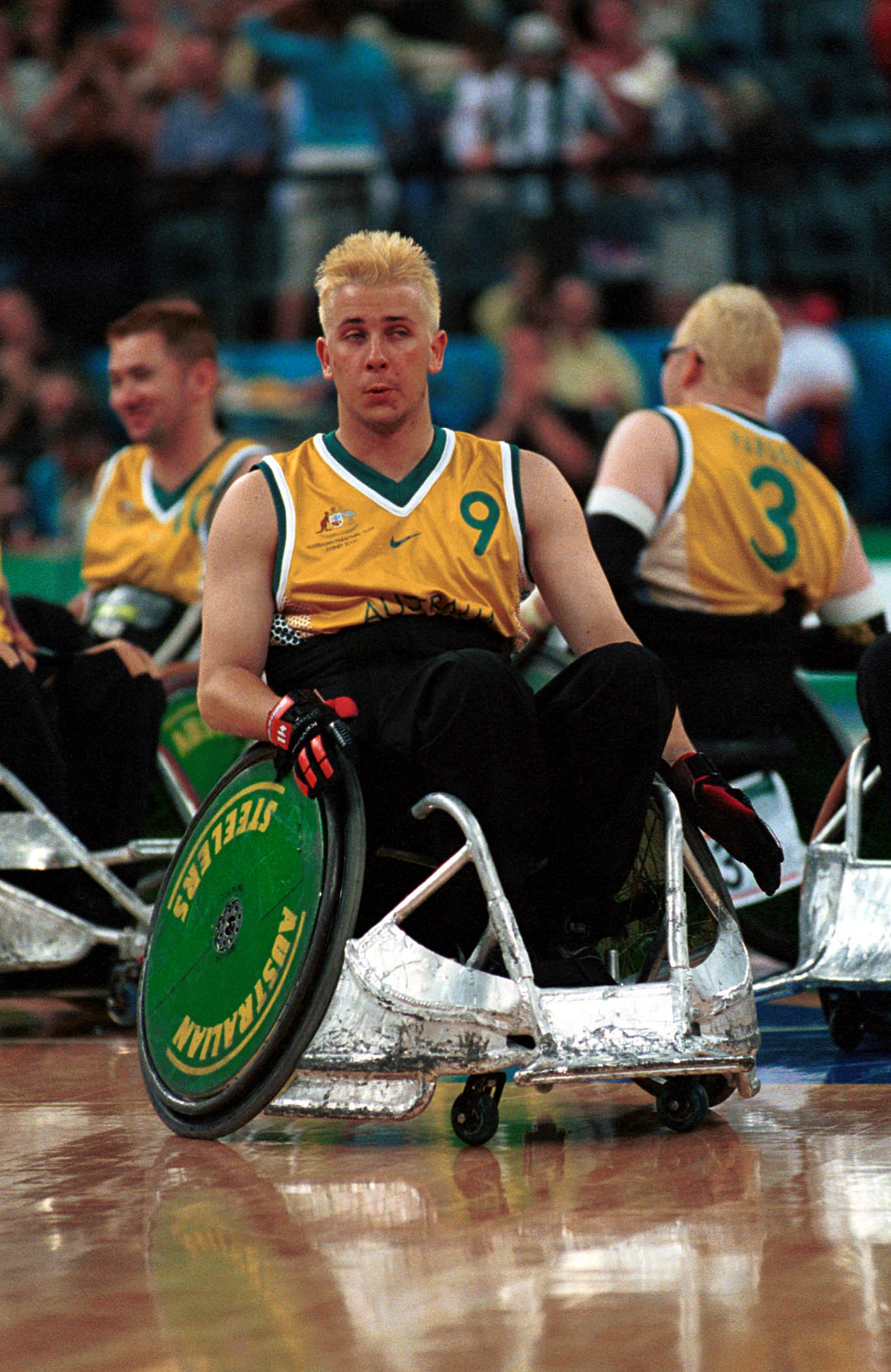
281000 - Wheelchair rugby Patrick Ryan action 2 - 3b - 2000 Sydney match photo

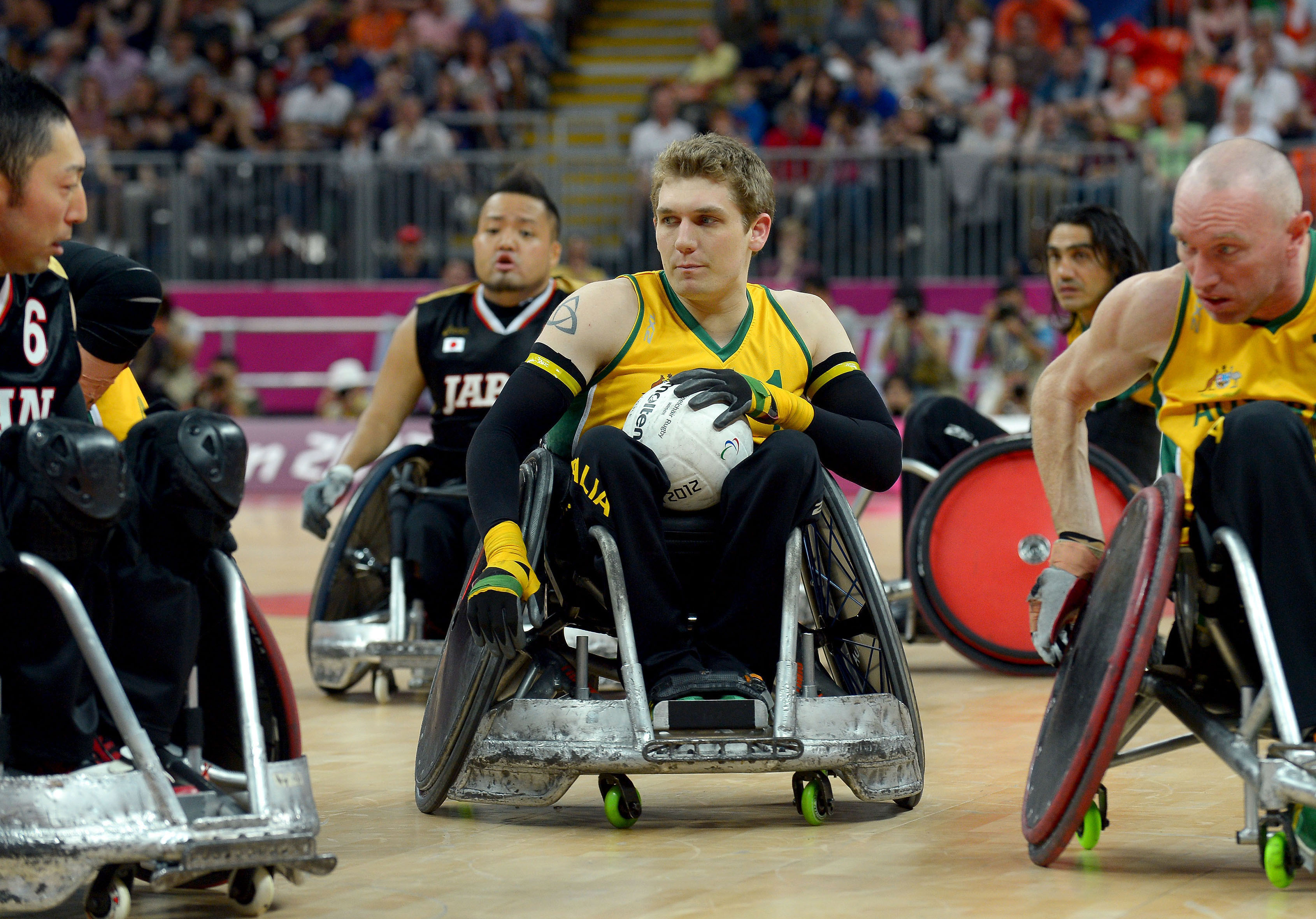
090912 - Ben Newton - 3b - 2012 Summer Paralympics

== Shooting ==
Shooting is a test of both accuracy and control. Paralympic shooting events involve athletes with physical impairments who compete in rifle and pistol events. Disabled shooters use the same firearms and clothing as able-bodied shooters however adaptations to equipment are allowed to accommodate for disabilities. These may include rifle and pistol supports, or aids to allow for visually impaired athletes to aim. Technology changes over the past few decades have allowed for visually impaired athletes to compete in shooting events. These athletes use audio signals to guide them in their aiming, with variable pitch and intensity to indicate closeness to the target. Systems such as the Ecoaims VIS500 use infrared LEDs which are placed above the target and are recognised by the camera module within the aiming device. Shooters who compete in wheelchairs (as shown in the photos) compete in special wheelchairs which comply with the governing body's regulations. These wheelchairs have relatively low back support and no armrests. The mechanical support is used to brace the rifles for shooting.

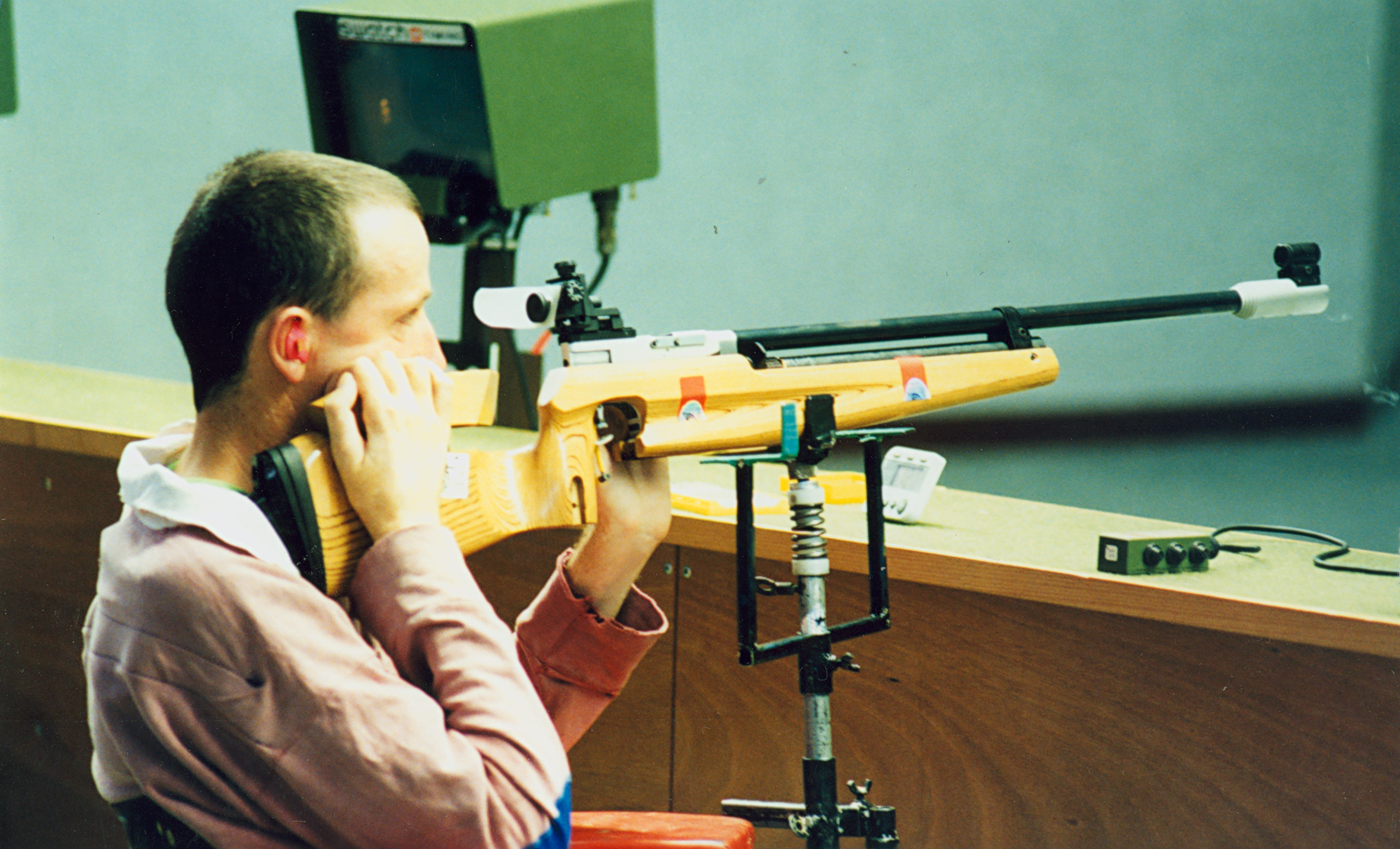
Peter Worsley, Australian paralympic shooter

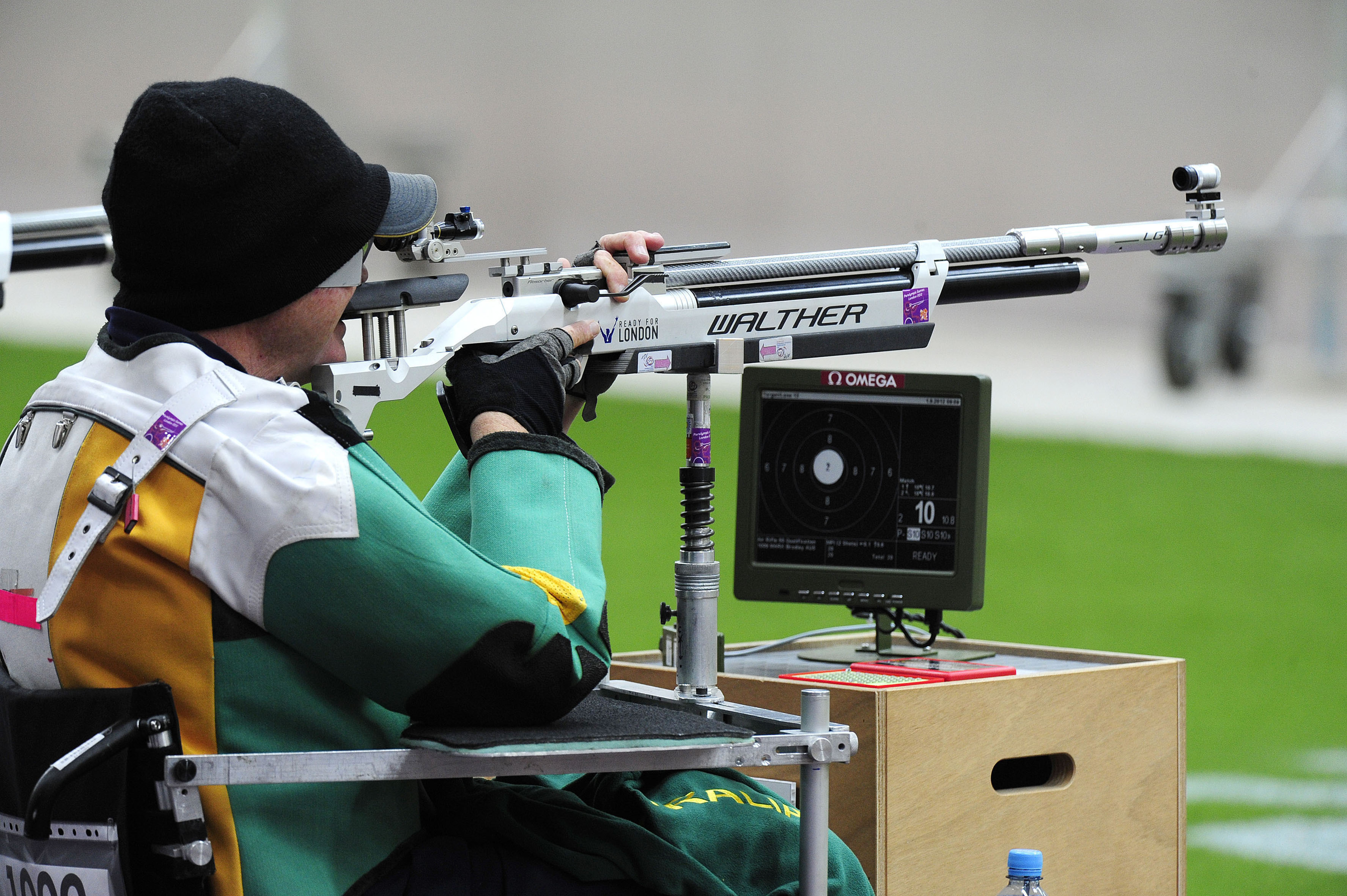
010912 - Bradley Mark - 3b - 2012 Summer Paralympics (01)

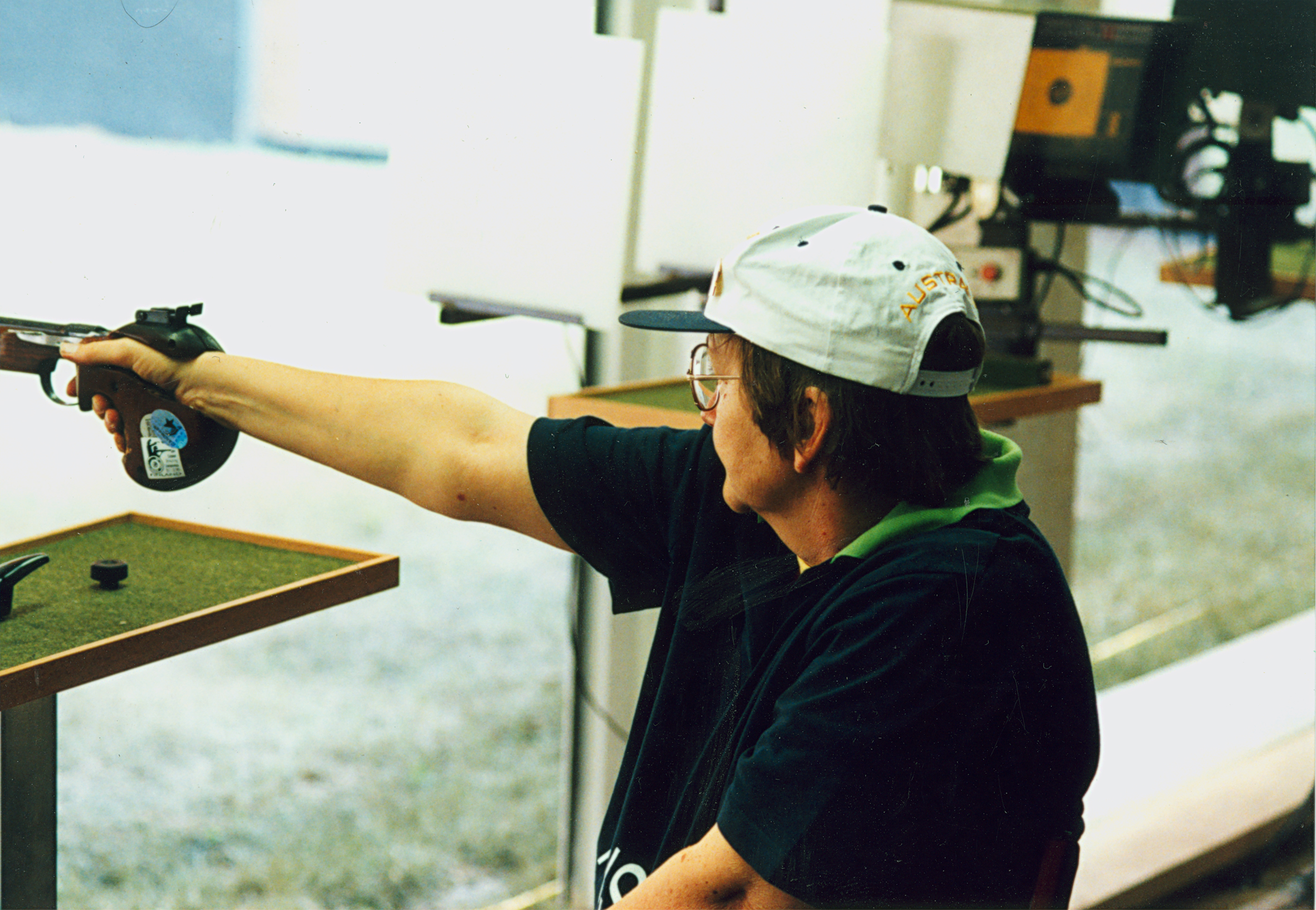
Australian paralympic shooter, Patricia Fischer shoots

== Wheelchair racing ==
Wheelchair racing equipment designs were limited from the 1940s until the 1990s, these restrictions greatly inhibited the innovation and design of racing wheelchairs. Modern racing wheelchairs have been developed solely for speed. Hence they use large rear wheels, a long wheelbase, small hand rims and a forward-leaning bucket seat. There are three methods to steering racing wheelchairs, by using the handlebars, the compensator or by doing a wheelie. The wheelchairs used at the beginning of wheelchair racing were slightly modified everyday chairs. Modern racing wheelchairs are made of advanced materials such as titanium and carbon fiber and have a significant amount of research and development behind them into factors such as rolling resistance and aerodynamics.

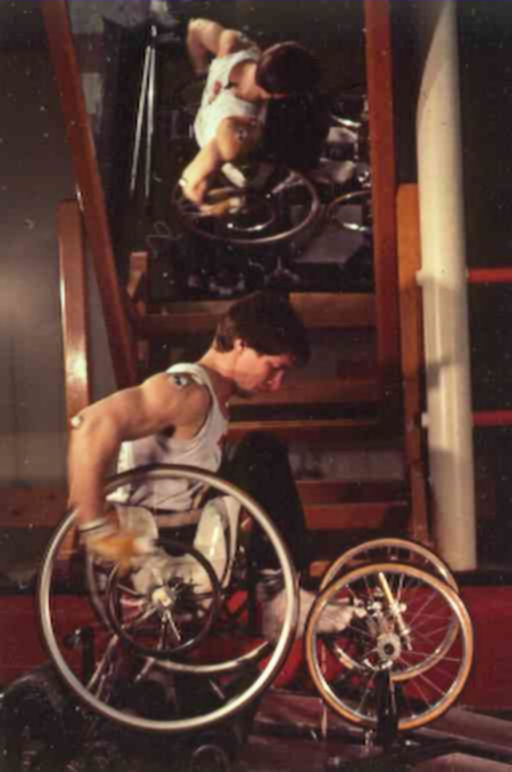
Rick Hansen

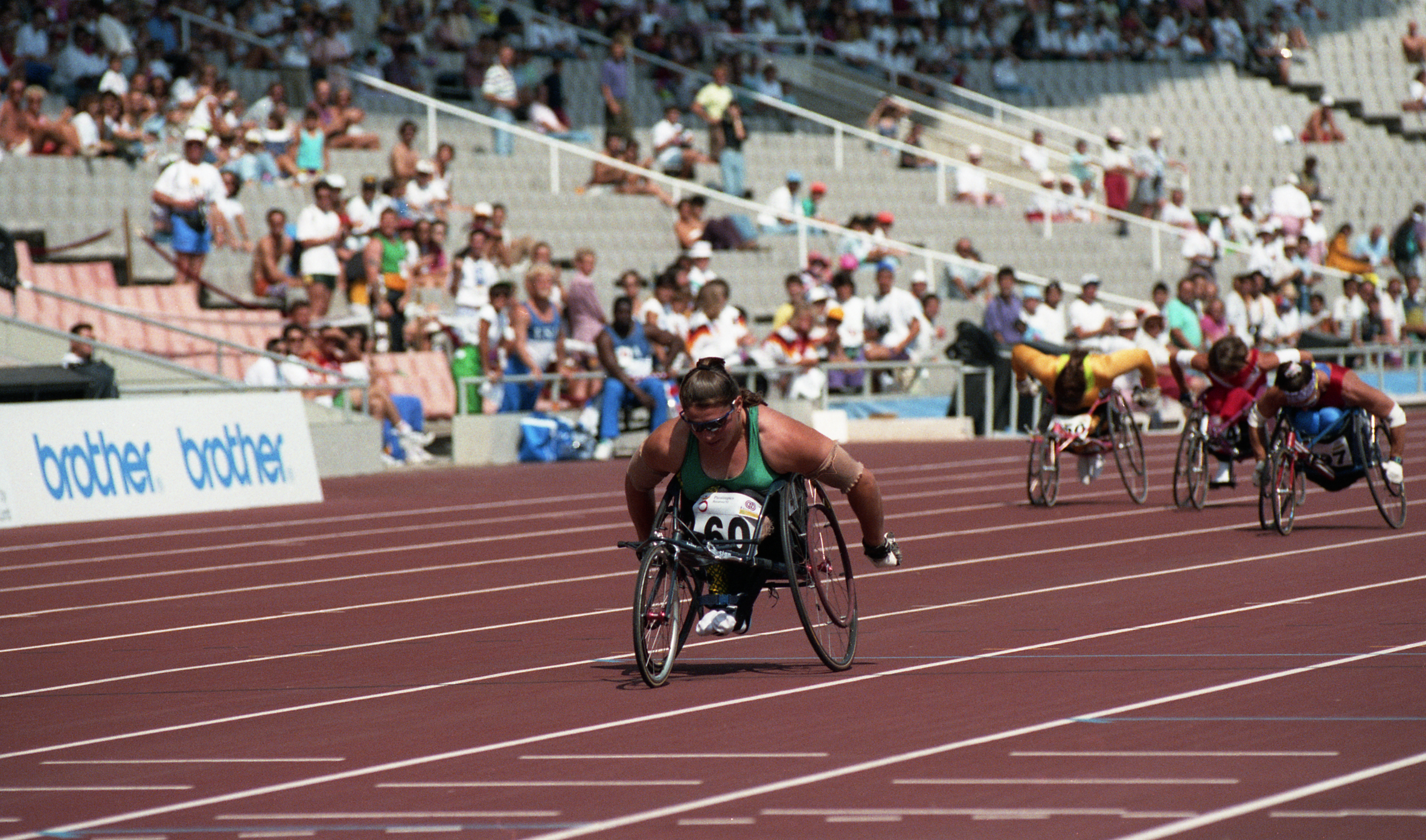
Louise Sauvage, wheelchair race, 1992 Paralympics

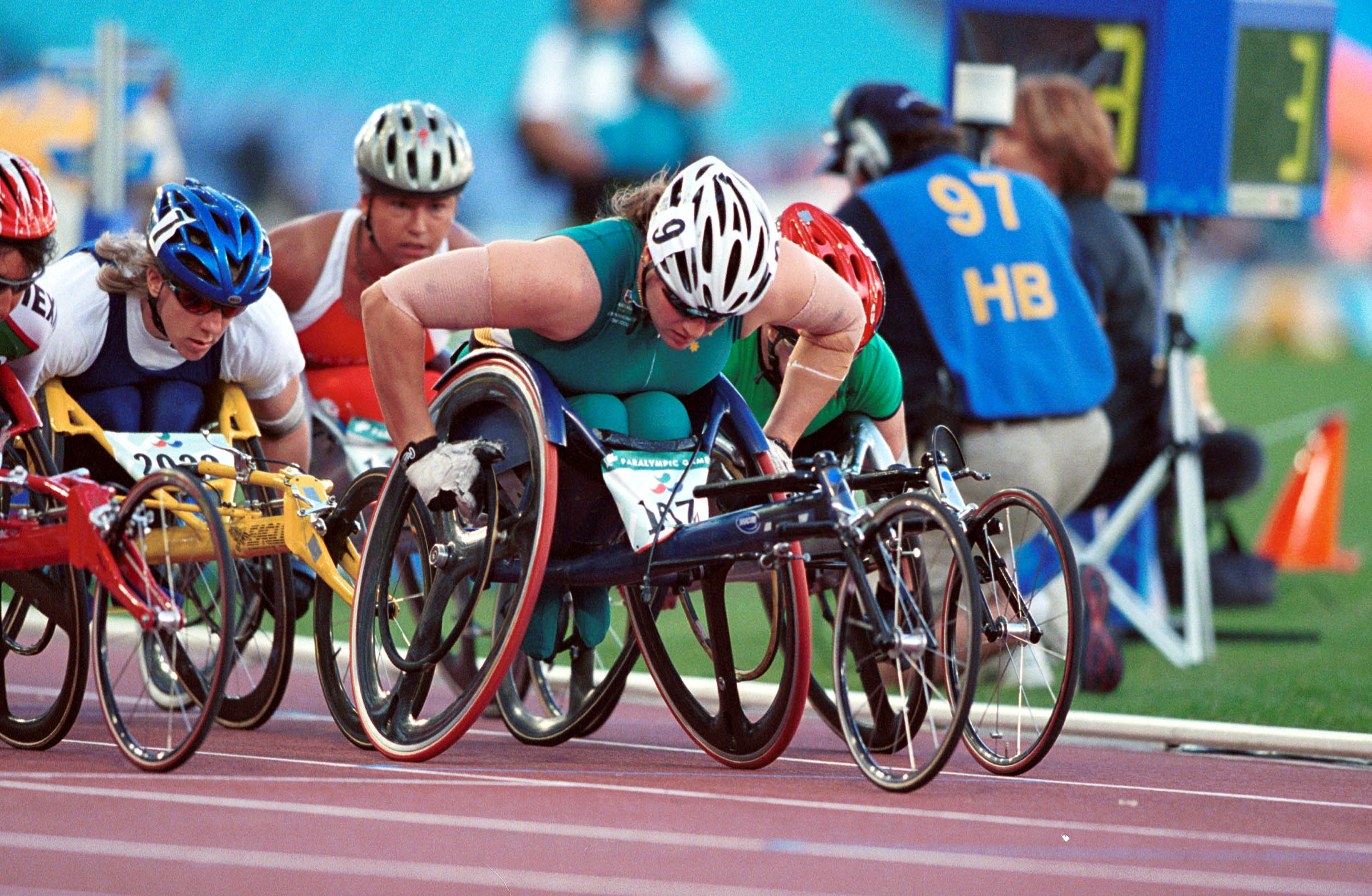
281000 - Athletics wheelchair racing Louise Sauvage action 2 - 3b - 2000 Sydney race photo
