= 2034 Winter Paralympics =

Multi-sport event in Utah, US

XVI Paralympic Winter Games
- Provisional logo
- Location: Utah, United States
- Opening: March 10, 2034
- Closing: March 19, 2034
- Stadium: Rice–Eccles Stadium

The 2034 Winter Paralympics, also known as the Utah 2034 Winter Paralympic Games, and branded as Utah 2034 (Note: Arapaho: Niico'ooowu' 2034; Gosiute Shoshoni: Tit'-so-pi 2034; Navajo: Sooléí 2034; Shoshoni: Soónkahni 2034), will be the 16th edition of the Winter Paralympic Games, an international winter multi-sport parasports event governed by the International Paralympic Committee. The Games are scheduled to take place in the U.S. state of Utah, United States, from March 10 to 19, 2034.

The Future Host Commission of the International Olympic Committee (IOC) initially nominated Salt Lake City as its preferred candidate on November 29, 2023. The bid was approved on July 24, 2024, during the 142nd IOC Session in Paris. This will be the second time the Winter Paralympic Games have been held in the state and also in the country, since the 2002 Games were also held in Utah. Salt Lake City, along with Innsbruck, became the second city in history to host the Winter Paralympic Games twice. This will also be the first Paralympics held in the United States that will be branded under a host U.S. state instead of a city.

== Bidding process ==
Under the new bidding process established under Olympic Agenda 2020, the Future Host Commission of the IOC engages in ongoing, non-committal "continuous dialogue" with parties that are interested in hosting a future Olympic Games. The Commission then recommends preferred candidates to be invited to "targeted dialogue" with the IOC Executive Board. In addition, a "host" can now consist of multiple regions or countries rather than just cities.

=== Host selection ===
On November 29, 2023, per the recommendation of the Future Host Commission, the IOC Executive Board invited the United States Olympic & Paralympic Committee (USOPC) to targeted dialogue, with Salt Lake City named the sole preferred candidate for the 2034 Winter Olympics.

During the 142nd IOC Session in Paris on July 24, 2024, Salt Lake City was elected as host of the 2034 Winter Olympics and 2034 Winter Paralympics, via a referendum to the 95 IOC delegates.

2034 Winter Olympics host city election
Region	NOC name	Yes	No	Abs
Utah	United States	83	6	6

== Development and Preparations ==
=== Venues ===
All planned venues were used for the same events during the 2002 Paralympics, with a few exceptions:

- The closing ceremonies are planned to be held at the Rice–Eccles Stadium, rather than at the Olympic Medals Plaza.
- Para snowboard was not held in 2002, and was added to the Paralympic winter program in 2014. Utah Olympic Park is planned to host para snowboard events in 2034.
- Wheelchair curling was also not held in 2002; it was first introduced in 2006. The Salt Palace convention center in downtown Salt Lake City will host wheelchair curling in 2034.

Venue	Location	Events	Capacity	Status
Maverik Center	West Valley City	Para ice hockey	10,100	Existing
Rice–Eccles Stadium	Salt Lake City	Ceremonies	51,444	Existing
Salt Palace	Salt Lake City	Wheelchair curling	6,500	Existing
Snowbasin	Weber County	Para alpine skiing	19,000	Existing
Soldier Hollow	Wasatch County	Para biathlon	15,000	Existing, renovated
Soldier Hollow	Wasatch County	Para cross-country skiing	15,000	Existing, renovated
Utah Olympic Park	Summit County	Para snowboard	8,000	Existing

== Marketing ==
The Games were originally billed as Salt Lake City—Utah 2034 upon the approval of the bid, as the changes implemented by Olympic Agenda 2020 allow regions to be credited as Olympic hosts as opposed to only cities. On November 24, 2025, a new provisional emblem was unveiled, shortening the branding of the Games to simply Utah 2034; organizing committee CEO Brad Wilson explained that the new branding was meant to be more inclusive of the surrounding regions hosting the Games alongside Salt Lake City, stating that he "want[ed] everyone in Utah to feel like they're a part of Team 2034, whether they live in our amazing capital city or whether they live in Vernal or Layton." Salt Lake City mayor Erin Mendenhall felt that it "hurt" for the city to not be part of the branding, but that Salt Lake City "always will be" an official Olympic city, and that she wanted the Games to "uplift the state".

== See also ==
- 2034 Winter Olympics
