= 2030 Winter Paralympics =

Multi-parasport event in the French Alps

XV Paralympic Winter Games
- Location: French Alps, France
- Opening: 1 March 2030
- Closing: 10 March 2030

The 2030 Winter Paralympics (French: Jeux paralympiques d'hiver de 2030), also known as the Alpes 2030 Paralympic Winter Games, will be the 15th edition of the Winter Paralympic Games, an international winter multi-sport parasports event governed by the International Paralympic Committee. The Games are scheduled to take place from 1 to 10 March 2030 in the French Alps. These will be the second Winter Paralympics, and the third Paralympics overall, to be hosted by France. Events will be held in the department of Alpes-Maritimes on its Hautes-Alpes, in Lyon and in the departments of Haute-Savoie and Savoie in Auvergne-Rhône-Alpes.

== Bidding process ==
Under the new bidding process established under Olympic Agenda 2020, the Future Host Commission of the IOC engages in ongoing, non-committal "continuous dialogue" with parties that are interested in hosting a future Olympic and Paralympic Games. The Commission then recommends preferred candidates to be invited to "targeted dialogue" with the IOC Executive Board. In addition, a "host" can now consist of multiple regions or countries rather than just cities.

=== Host selection ===
On 29 November 2023, per the recommendation of the Future Host Commission, the IOC Executive Board invited the French Paralympic and Sports Committee to targeted dialogue proposing that the 2030 Winter Paralympics be held in the French Alps.

The French Alps were conditionally ratified as hosts during the 142nd IOC Session on 24 July 2024 in Paris, France; as per the new bid process, the vote was in the form of a referendum to the 95 IOC delegates. The decision to award the Games was made under the condition that financial guarantees from federal and state governments be secured by October 2024; usually, these are secured as part of the bid process, but this was hindered by the French political crisis and 2024 French legislative elections.

In October 2024, then-prime minister Michel Barnier sent a letter to IOC president Thomas Bach to confirm the French government's financial support.

2030 Winter Olympics host city election
City	NOC name	Yes	No	Abs
French Alps	France	84	4	7

== Development and preparations ==
=== Venues ===
==== Lyon cluster ====
Venue	Events	Capacity	Status
Eurexpo	Para ice hockey	TBA	Existing with temporary stands
Eurexpo	Wheelchair curling	TBA	Existing with temporary stands

==== Savoie cluster ====
Venue	Events	Capacity	Status
Courchevel	Para alpine skiing	TBA	Existing
Courchevel	Para snowboard	TBA	Existing

==== Haute-Savoie cluster ====
Venue	Events	Capacity	Status
La Clusaz	Para cross-country skiing and Para biathlon	12,500	Existing

== Marketing ==
=== Emblem ===
The emblem of the Games was unveiled on 18 June 2026 during an event at Briançon. The emblem is a stylized mountain peak with a blue, purple, and red gradient, formed by rays of light; it is stated to represent the "promise of clarity, warmth and renewal" and the "convergence" of nations at its summit. The Paralympic emblem uses a similar design, but with the mountain formed in negative space by lights shining behind it. Alongside the emblem, the branding of the Games was also shortened from "French Alps 2030"/"Alpes Françaises 2030" to simply "Alpes 2030". The emblems were designed by Paris based design agency Saint-Lazare.

== See also ==
- 2030 Winter Olympics
- Paralympics celebrated in France:
  - 1992 Winter Paralympics
  - 2030 Winter Paralympics

Preceded by Milan–Cortina d'Ampezzo	Winter Paralympics; Alps; 2030	Succeeded by Utah
