= SNP Heroes Trail =

Long-distance hiking trail in Slovakia

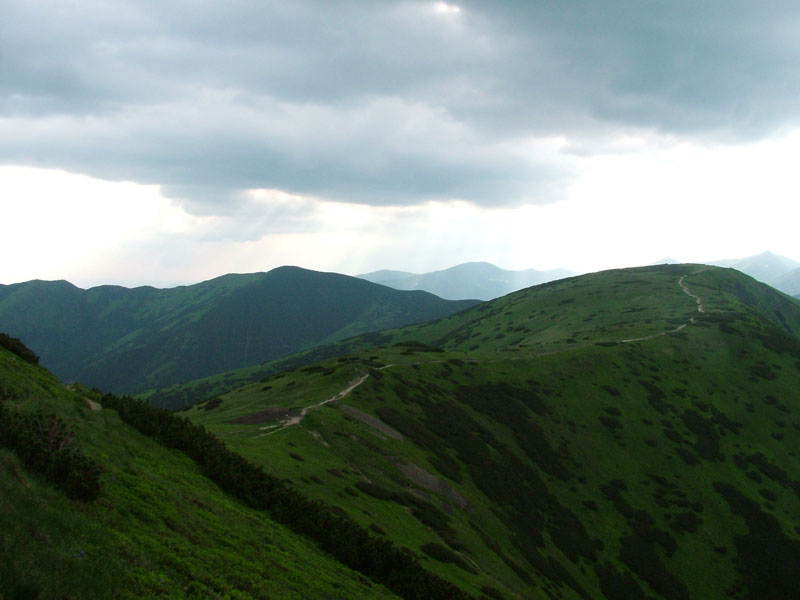
- View of the ridge of the Low Tatras from Štefánik's cottage
- Length: 772.1 km (479.8 mi)
- Location: Slovakia; Czech Republic
- Established: 1956
- Trailheads: Dukla Pass; Devín Castle
- Use: Hiking
- Elevation gain/loss: 31,000 m
- Highest point: Ďumbier 2,046 m
- Lowest point: Devín 143 m
- Difficulty: Easy; medium; high
- Season: Year-round
- Waymark: Red
- Surface: Natural
- Website: cestasnp.sk

The SNP Heroes Trail (Slovak: Cesta hrdinov SNP), inaugurated in 1956, is a long-distance hiking trail in Slovakia that runs from the Dukla Pass in the northeast of the country to Devín Castle, on the western border with Austria, with a total length of 772.1 km. It partially extends into the Czech Republic. The trail runs through most parts of the country where significant events of the 1944–45 Slovak National Uprising (Slovak: Slovenské národné povstanie) occurred and is thus named after it. The trail is marked with red blazes on the majority of its length, and it mostly follows the route of the E8 European long distance path. It is maintained by the Slovak Tourist Club.

== Route ==
Dukla Pass – Svidník – Bardejov – Veľký Šariš – Kysak – Košice – Štós kúpele – Dobšinský kopec – Telgárt – Kráľova hoľa – Čertovica – Chopok – Donovaly – Kremnické Bane – Pod Vyšehradom – Čičmany – Trenčín – Javorina – Myjava – Pezinská Baba – Devín Castle

== Czechoslovak trail ==
The southern route of the Czech Trail, maintained by the Czech Tourist Club, connects with the SNP Heroes Trail, forming approximately 1,770 km of continuous hiking paths.

== See also ==
- List of long-distance footpaths
