= Low Tatras National Park =

National park in Central Slovakia

Low Tatra National Park Národný park Nízke Tatry
- IUCN category II (national park)
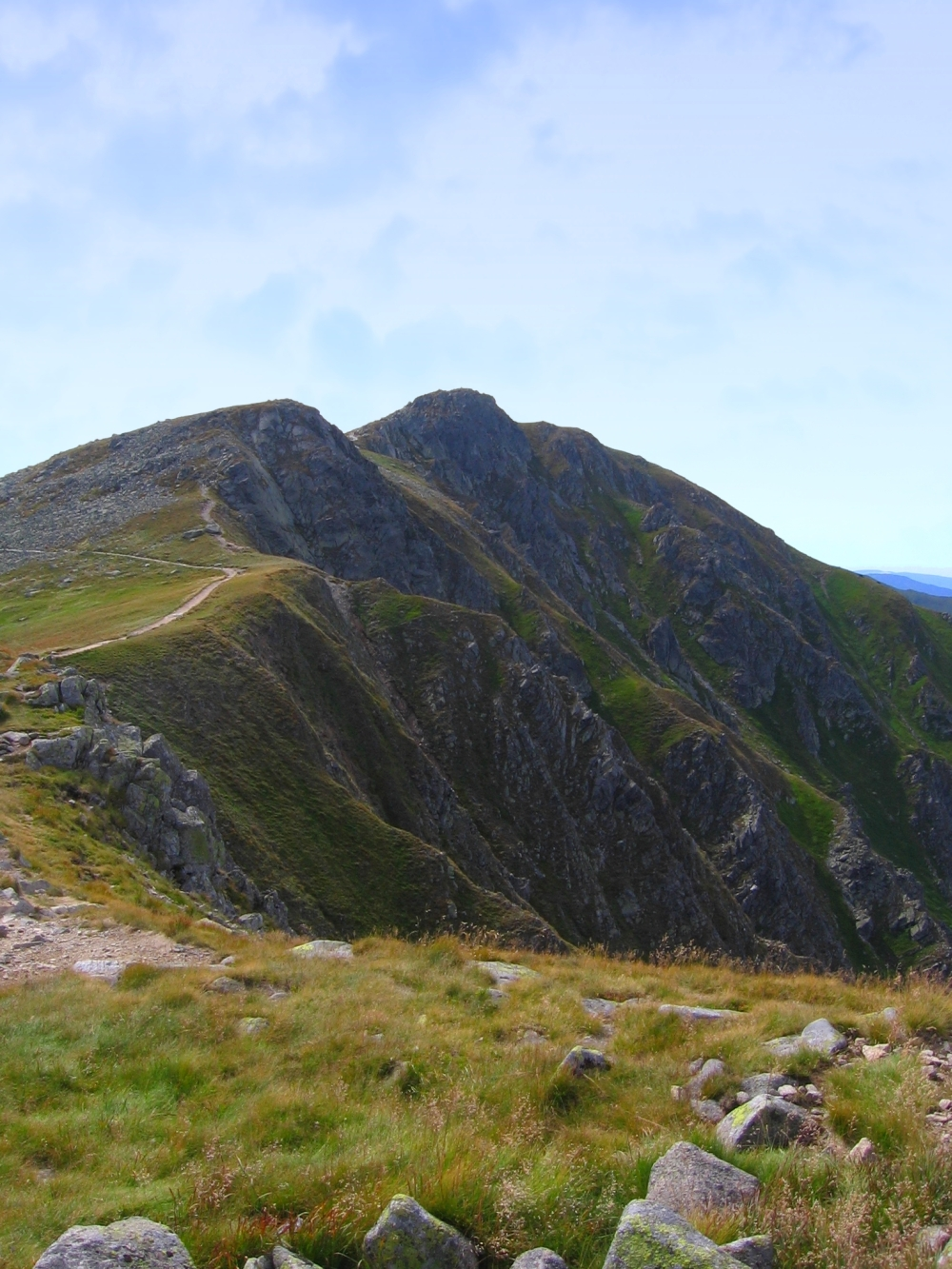
- Dereše peak
- Interactive map of Low Tatra National Park; Národný park Nízke Tatry
- Location: Central Slovakia
- Coordinates: 48.958964°N 19.665914°E
- Area: 728 km^{2} (281 sq mi)
- Established: 1978
- Governing body: Správa Národného parku Nízke Tatry in Banská Bystrica
- Website: www.napant.sk

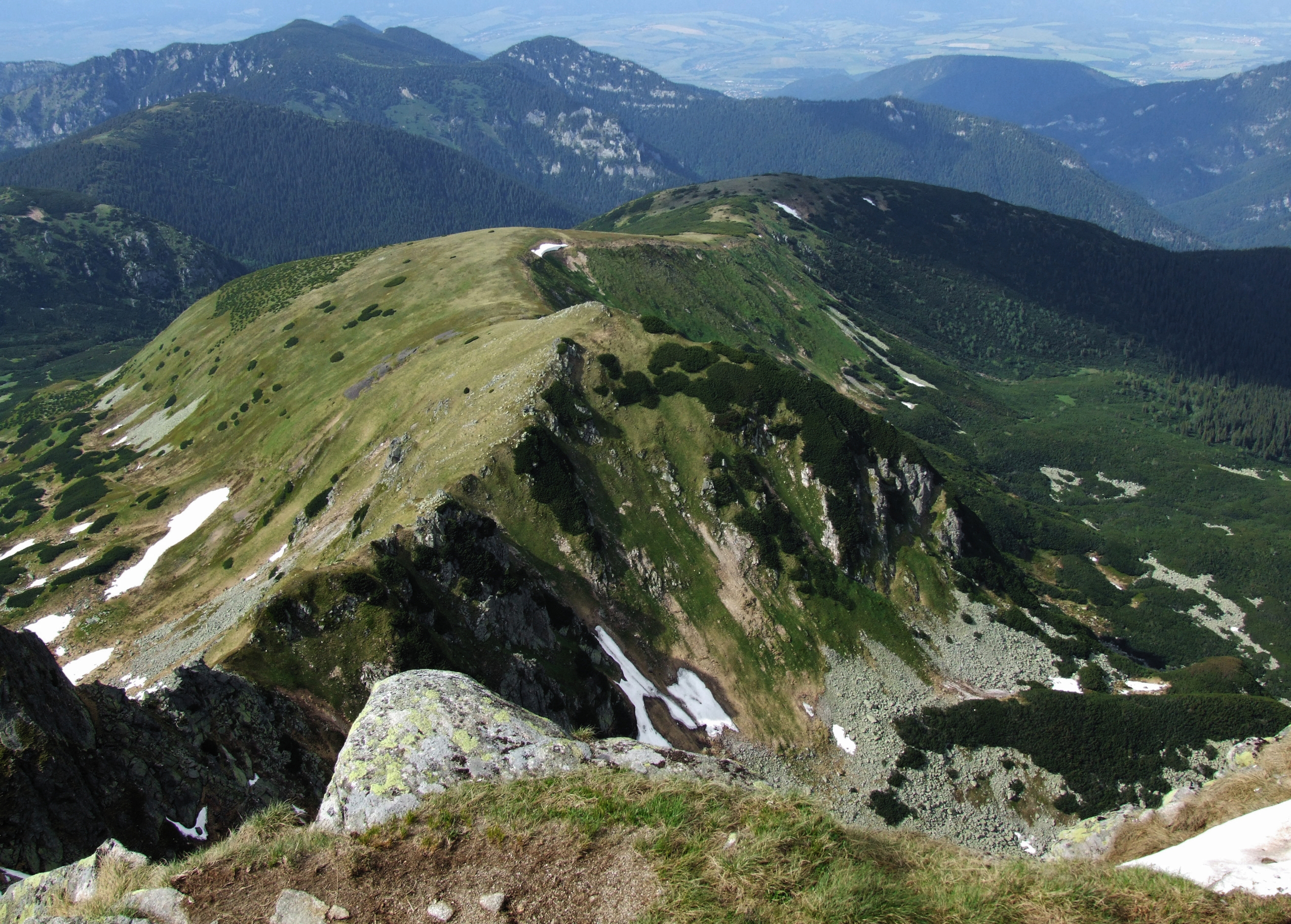
Panorama of the Low Tatras from Ďumbier

Low Tatras National Park (Slovak: Národný park Nízke Tatry; abbr. NAPANT) is a national park in Central Slovakia, between the Váh River and the Hron River valleys. The park and its buffer zone cover the whole Low Tatras mountain range. The National Park covers an area of 728 km^{2} and its buffer zone covers an area of 1,102 km^{2}, which makes it the largest national park in Slovakia.

It is divided between the Banská Bystrica Region (Banská Bystrica and Brezno districts), Žilina Region (Ružomberok and Liptovský Mikuláš districts) and Prešov Region (Poprad District). The highest peak is Ďumbier (2,043 m or 7,063 ft). Four major Slovak rivers rise below the Kráľova hoľa peak: Váh, Hron, Hnilec and Hornád.

== History ==
The protection process of the Low Tatras territory started with first attempts in 1918-1921 and right after the second World War. In 1963 a proposal was made for the establishment of the National Park Low Tatras under the name of Central Slovakia National Park. During the period between 1965 and 1966, right before the completion of the last proposal, a draft for a National Park Ďumbier was proposed. The aim of this draft was to include the north and south part of the central territory of the Low Tatras. From 1967 till 1968 the draft was reformulated with the goal to establish the national park on the 25th anniversary of the Slovak National Uprising. But it took another 10 years to overcome various obstacles that prevented the establishment of the national park. In 1978 the national park was created with the Regulation 119/1978 of the Slovak Socialistic Republic. The area of the national park was set at 81,095 ha and its protection zone at 123,990 ha. The status of the national park was published in the same year by the Ministry of Culture of the Slovak Socialistic Republic in the regulation 120/1978. This regulation set out the conditions for the protection of particular areas.

The borders of the park and the protection zones were revised on 17 June 1997 by regulation No 182/1997 of the government of the Slovak Republic. The revised area of the national park measured 72,842 ha, which is 8,253 ha less than the original area. The revised area of the protection zones was adjusted to 110,162 ha which is 13,828 ha less than the area set in 1978.

== Tourism ==
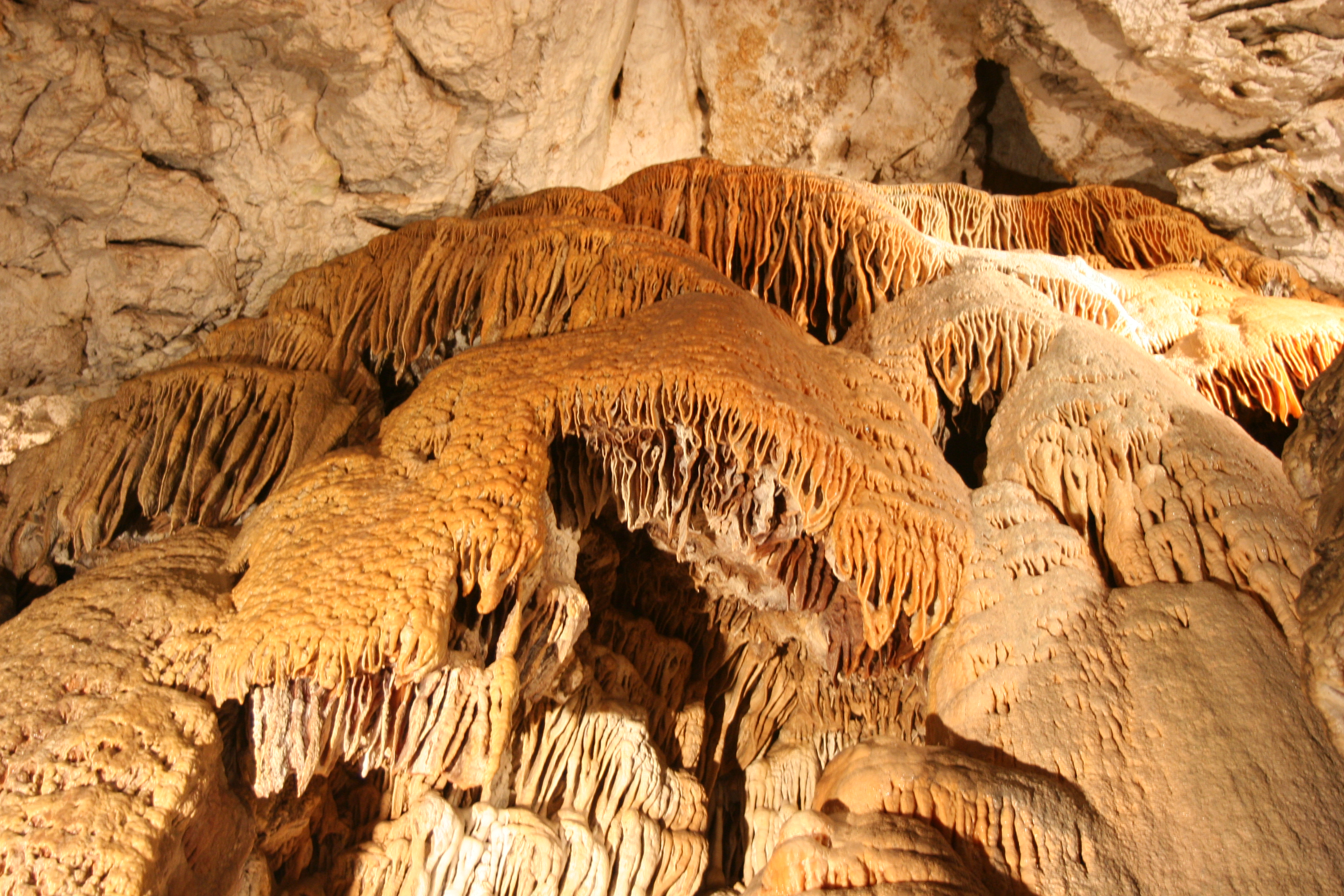
Interior of Demänovská Freedom Cave

The park has excellent conditions for many sports activities. Some of the resorts include Jasna Low Tatras, Tále, Demänovská dolina and Čertovica. The following caves are open to the public: Demänovská jaskyňa Slobody (Demänovská Cave of Freedom), Demänovská ľadová jaskyňa (Demänovská Ice Cave), Bystrá Cave, Važecká Cave and the Cave of Dead Bats.

== Protected areas ==
Currently, the following protected areas are established in the area of the park or its buffer zone, covering 98.89 km^{2}:

- 10 national nature reserves
- 10 nature reserves including Horné lazy
- 5 national nature monuments
- 6 nature monuments
- 1 protected site

== See also ==
- Protected areas of Slovakia
- Tatra National Park, Slovakia
