= Hriate =

Slovak alcoholic drink

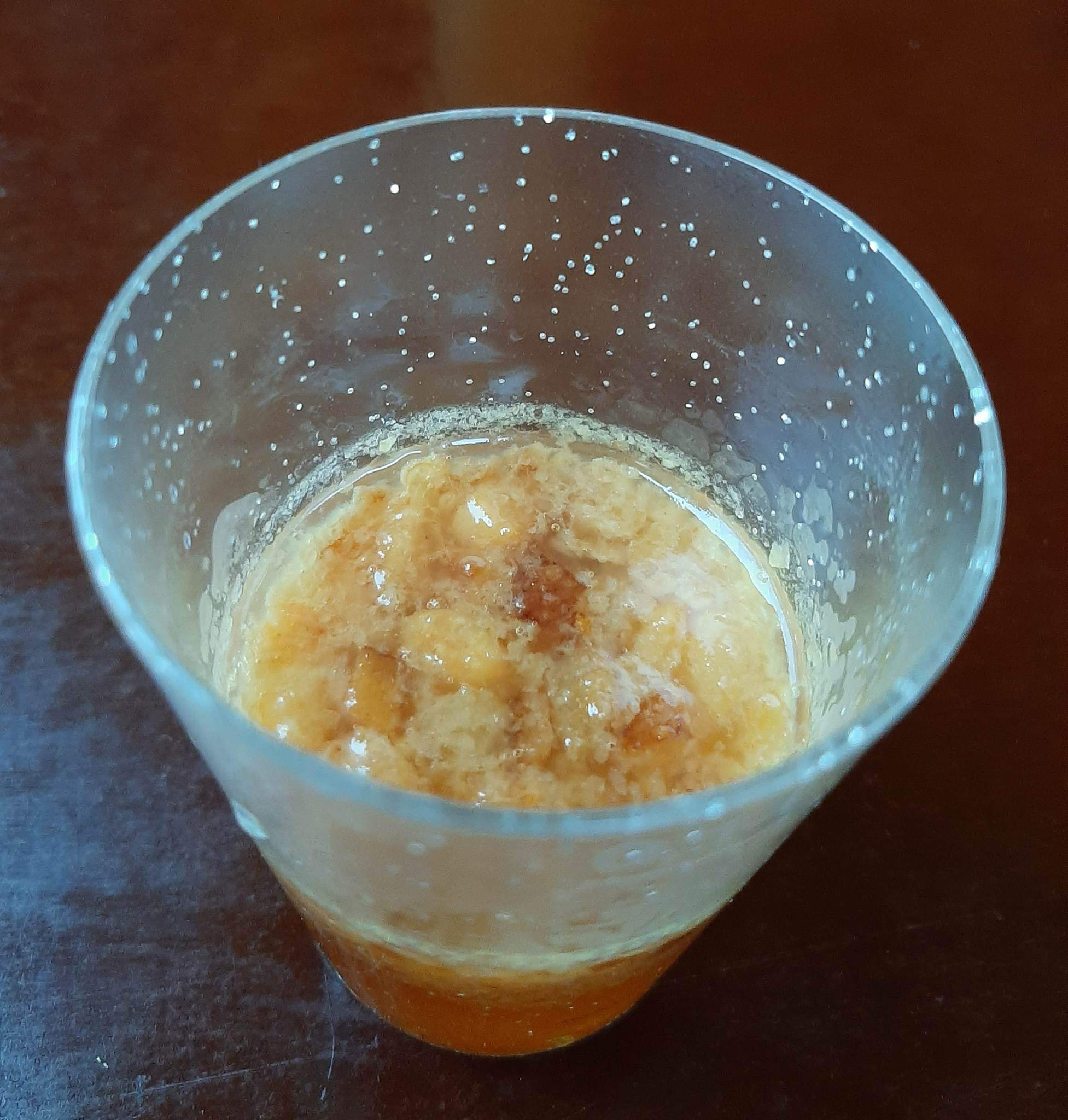
Hriate at the Christmas Market, Bratislava (2022)

Hriate (Slovak pronunciation: ['ɦrɪɐte]) or hriata (Slovak pronunciation: ['ɦrɪɐta], literally "Heated", dialectally hriatô, hriato) is a Slovak alcoholic drink with different variants of preparation. It can also be drunk as an aperitif.

It is prepared in several forms, mainly in Central and Eastern Slovakia, especially in the Liptov, Orava and Spiš regions. The hriate base is honey with fried bacon or butter, but there are also variants with sugar (caramel) instead of honey, and liquor. Traditionally it is served at Christmas or during the winter season in mountain and foothill areas. Many households have their own specific recipes. The drink was considered a healing agent.

In Liptov, hriate was served before dinner on Christmas Eve and New Year's Eve and was traditionally made from vodka warmed over caramel and eaten with oškvarky.
