= Jasná Low Tatras =

Jasna Low Tatras is an all-year mountain tourism resort, situated in the heart of Low Tatras Central Slovakia. In winter it is the largest ski area in Central Europe. The history of the resort started in the 1950s, when the first system of cableways from North of Chopok to South was built. It covers both sides of Mount Chopok - Chopok South and North. It is at an altitude (margin) of 900–2024 m.

== Seasons ==
=== Winter ===
During the winter season there are 7 chairlifts and 18 ski sifts in the operation. Is serves 34 km of downhill slopes and freeride zones. There are slopes for every skier of each skills level. Beginners are starting in Biela Put, where the beginners area of ski school and an easier slope to handle. Intermediate slopes in Zahradky and championship slopes from Lukova and Chopok at the top are available. For free skiers there is a superb snow park and spectacular bowls with steep couloirs (Chopok North) and wide open spaces (Chopok South). There is also ski-climbing, freeride and cross-country skiing. The center offers activities such as SkiFOX, Snowscoot, Snowbike, kitewing, paragliding, rope park, paintball, night sleighing but also quality of complementary services - ski and snowboard school, kindergarten, rentals, service repositories, sports shops. The length of the winter season is around the beginning of December until the end of April.

=== Summer ===
In summer, it is the biggest attraction in the resort countryside of Low Tatras. The center in recent years is well known not only because of tourism and the cable cableways but also because of its unique BikePark. There are other activities including trampolines, archery, paintball, paragliding, rope park and additional services including rental bike, scooter, sports shops, guides and instructor for hiking, Nordic walking, and climbing.
