= Czech Trail =

Long-distance hiking trail in the Czech Republic

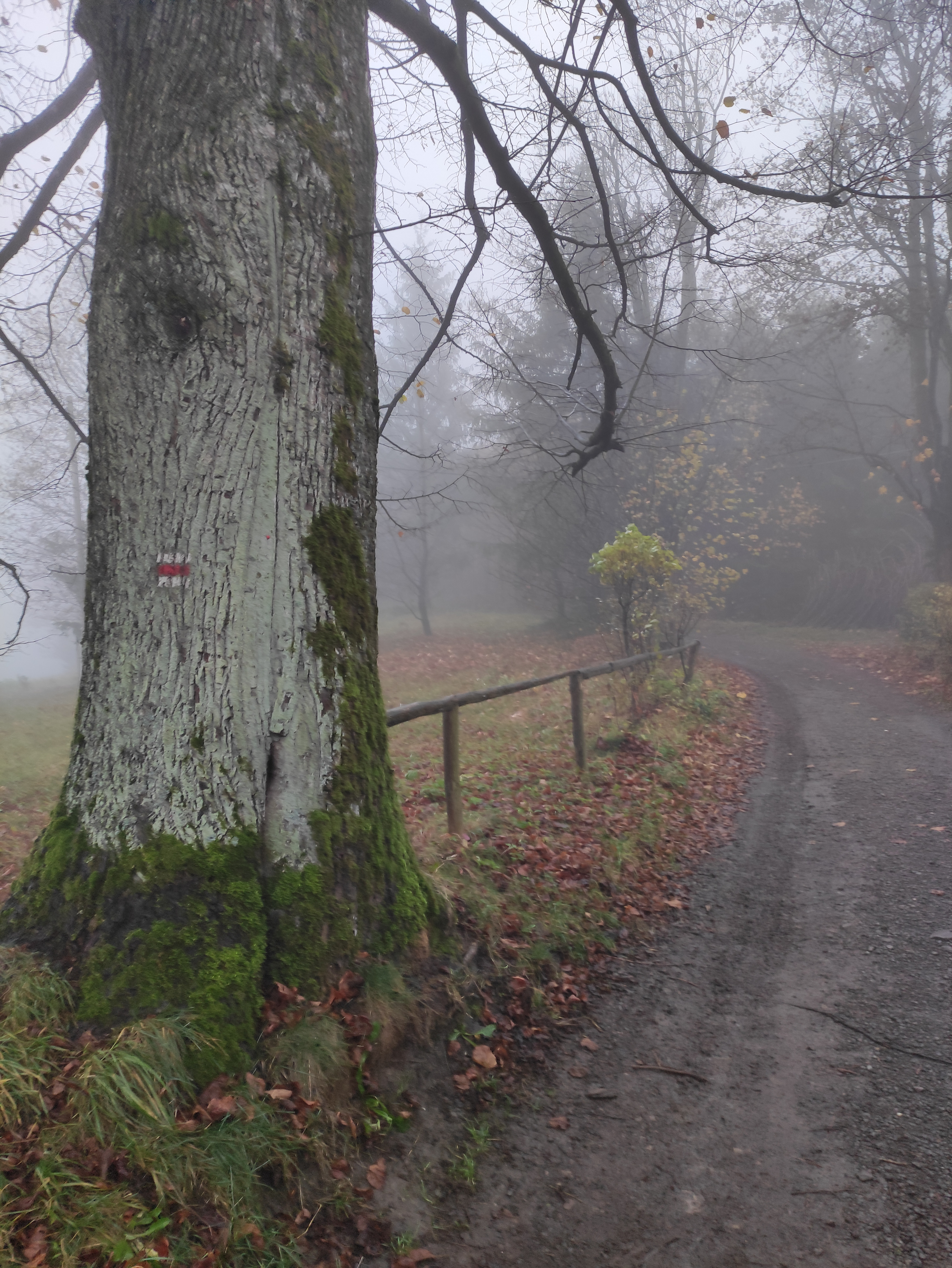
- A trail marker on a tree near Mosty u Jablunkova
- Length: 2,000 km
- Location: Czech Republic
- Established: 2020
- Use: Hiking
- Difficulty: Easy; medium; high
- Season: Year-round
- Surface: Natural
- Website: stezkaceskem.cz/en

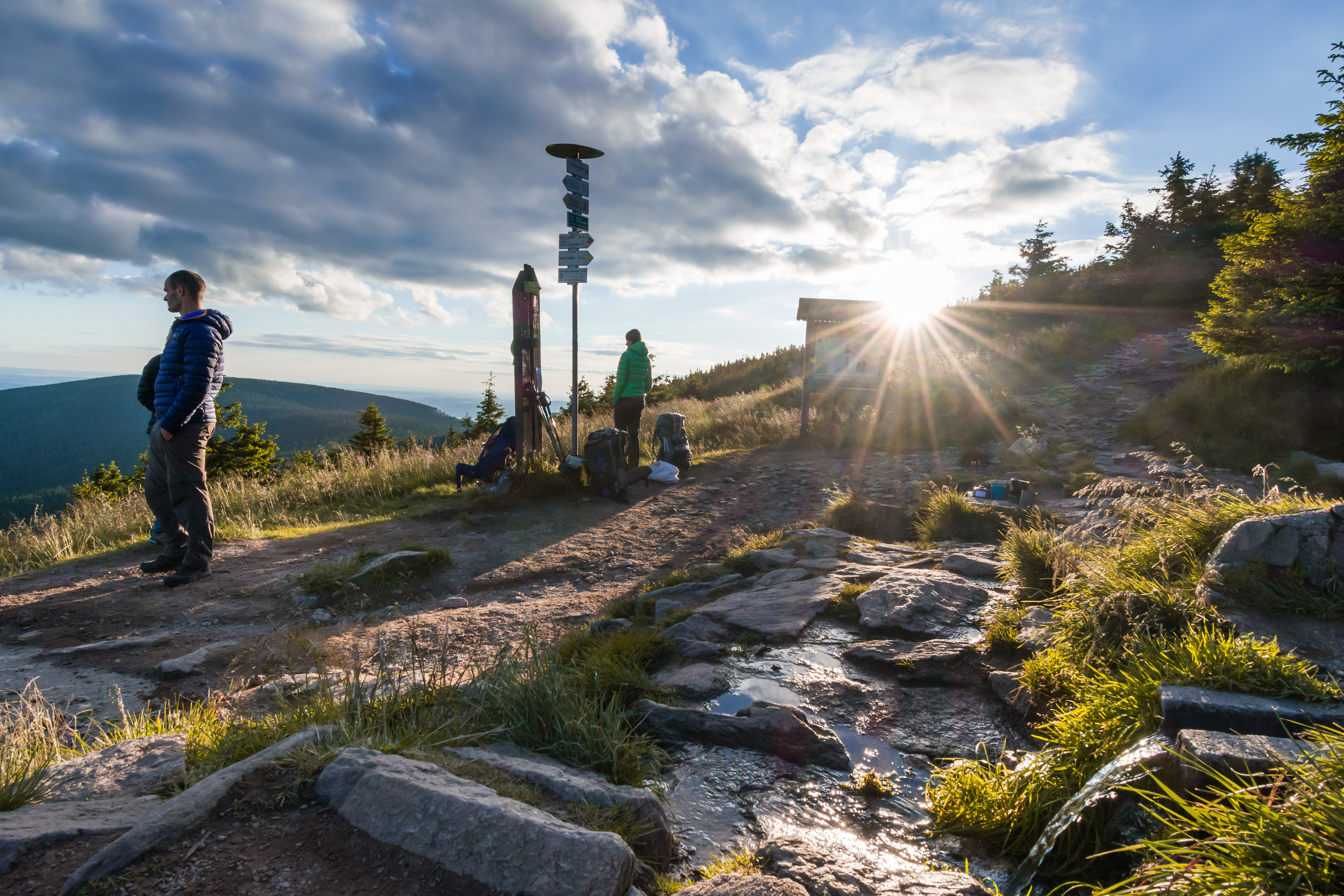
Hikers on the Czech Trail in 2020

The Czech Trail (Czech: Stezka Českem) is a long-distance hiking trail that circumnavigates the entire Czech Republic. It has two routes, north and south, both approximately 1,000 km long. The Czech Trail is a non-commercial project whose motto is "Anyone can do it". It is included in the European long-distance paths network.

== History ==
The idea for a trail that would circumnavigate the entire country was conceived by Czech long-distance hiker Martin Úbl and his friends in 2019, while they were walking the Great Divide Trail in Canada. They began by delineating the routes and walking them, before creating a website and social media pages. They subsequently approached the Czech Tourist Club and CzechTourism for support and official recognition.

In 2021, the Czech Tourist Club agreed to mark the trail with dedicated signposts, with the work being carried out in April and May 2022. Since 2022, the trail has been included in the long-distance trail application FarOut.

In July and August 2022, ČRo Radiožurnál broadcast a series of daily reports about the trail, with ten reporters walking both routes simultaneously over the span of five weeks. In 2023, Czech Television filmed a ten-part documentary series called Stezka Českem, detailing a trek over the entire northern route of the trail by actor Miroslav Vladyka, who introduced not only the most interesting places on the route but also the stories of people connected to it. The series was created with the support of CzechTourism, the Prague wheelchair sports club, and regional tourism authorities.

In January 2024, the educational project Czech Trail for Schools (Czech: Stezka Českem pro školy) was launched together with the Ministry of Education, Youth and Sports.

== Routes ==
The northern route of the Czech Trail, divided into ten sections, runs along the northern border of the Czech Republic, passing through the country's sections of the Fichtel Mountains, Ore Mountains, Lusatian Mountains, Jizera Mountains, Giant Mountains, Broumov Highlands, Orlické Mountains, Králický Sněžník Mountains, Beskids, and Golden Mountains, as well as Bohemian Switzerland National Park, Adršpach-Teplice Rocks, and Hrubý Jeseník.

The southern route leads through the Fichtel Mountains, Upper Palatine Forest, Bohemian Forest, Gratzen Mountains, Czech Canada, Podyjí National Park, White Carpathians, and Beskids.

The full trail, which measures approximately 2,000 km, partially passes through Germany, Poland (e.g., in the Giant Mountains), and Slovakia (White Carpathians).

== Trail angels ==
The Czech Trail introduces the concept of trail angels to the Czech Republic. These are individuals who live on or near long-distance trails and who volunteer to assist hikers on their journeys. This may include camping spots in backyards, the opportunity to fill up water canteens, recharge electronic devices, and some trail angels even drive hikers when needed.

== Czechoslovak trail ==
The southern route of the Czech Trail connects with Slovakia's SNP Heroes Trail and is organized in collaboration with the Czech Tourist Club and the Slovak Tourist Club, forming approximately 1,770 km of continuous hiking paths. The Slovak section passes through the Volovec Mountains, Low Tatras, Kremnica Mountains, and White Carpathians.

== Czech Trail for cyclists ==
The Czech Trail also includes a cycling component, whose course runs entirely on established cycle routes, some of which follow the hiking paths, while others do not.

== See also ==
- List of long-distance footpaths
