= Čertovica =

Čertovica Pass
- Location within Europe
- Elevation: 1,232 metres (4,042 ft)

Third Approach
- Location: Liptov and Horehronie; Slovakia
- Range: Low Tatras
- Coordinates: 48°54′20″N 19°44′09″E

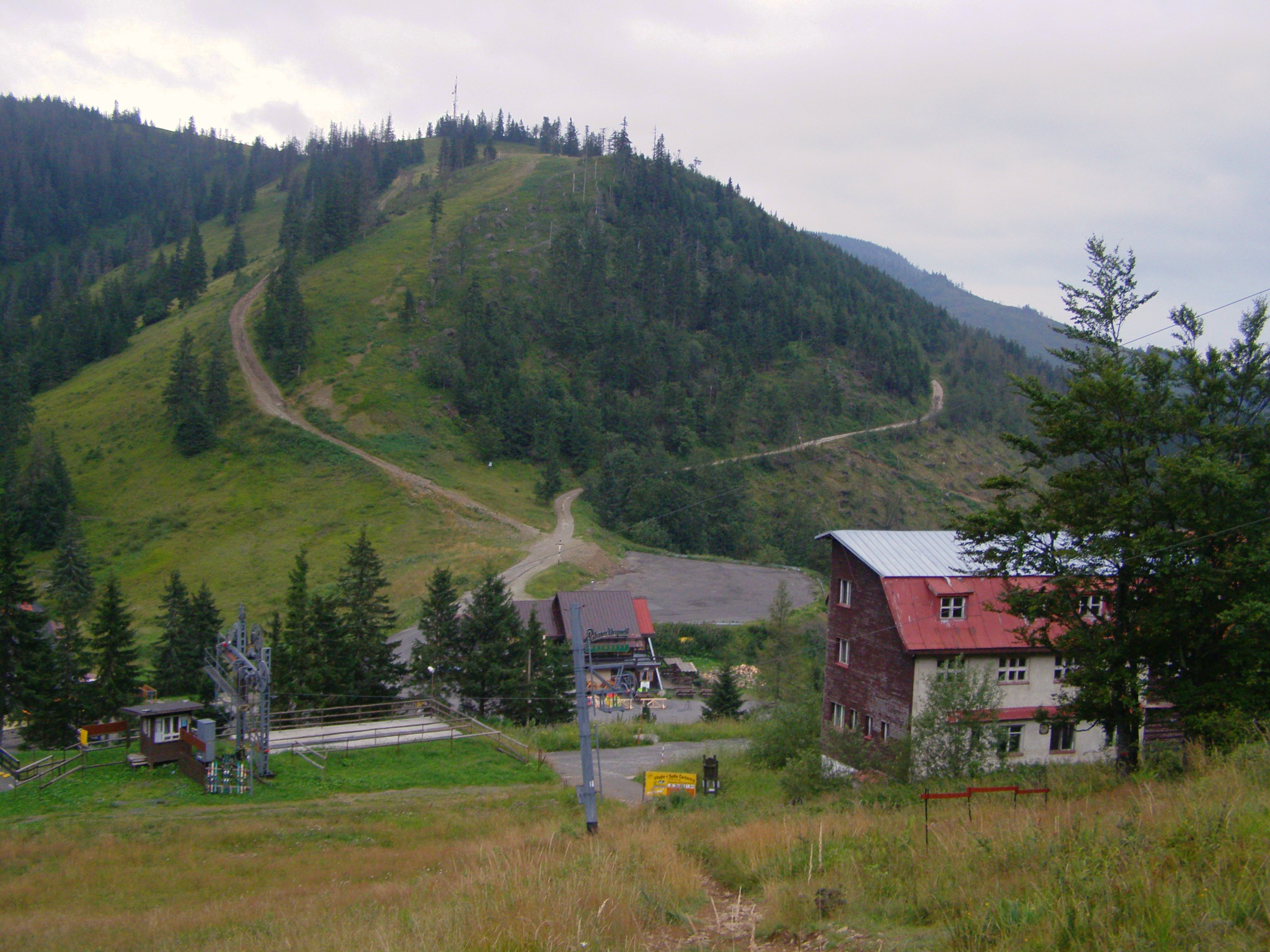
Čertovica pass.

Čertovica is a mountain pass in the Low Tatras mountain range in Slovakia. It connects regions of Liptov and Horehronie. With 1,232 metres (4,042 ft) AMSL, it is the highest paved mountain pass in Slovakia. It is open all year round, however, it can be rarely closed during the winter because of the severe weather conditions. The pass was daily crossed by more than 2000 vehicles as of 2005. On the pass is also situated a minor ski resort and a chalet offering accommodation. The pass is also an important starting or endpoint for many hiking trips because it lies in the middle of the range and is close to some of the range's popular summits as the highest Ďumbier and third-highest Chopok.

== See also ==
- List of highest paved roads in Europe
- List of mountain passes
