= Horné lazy =

Coordinates: 48.814444°N 19.599444°E

- IUCN category IV (habitat/species management area)
- Interactive map of Horné lazy
- Area: 0.3429 km²
- Established: 1961
- Governing body: ŠOP - S- NAPANT

Horné lazy is a nature reserve in the Slovak municipality of Valaská in the Brezno District. The nature reserve covers an area of 34 ha in the Low Tatras mountain area. It has a protection level of 4 under the slovak nature protection system which corresponds to a protection level I according to IUCN standards.

== Fauna ==
The fauna of the reserve includes Eurasian sparrowhawk, Tree pipit, Yellow-bellied toad, Hazel grouse, Eurasian eagle-owl, Common buzzard, European nightjar, European greenfinch, Common raven, Lesser horseshoe bat, Eurasian wren, Common toad, Edible dormouse, Wildcat, Sand lizard, European badger, Hazel dormouse, Apollo, Clouded Apollo, Common frog, Red squirrel, Vipera berus, Viviparous lizard and Eresus moravicus .

== Flora ==
Plant species present in the nature reserve include Lily of the valley and Neotinea tridentata.
