= Valaská =

Valaská Garamolaszka
- Municipality
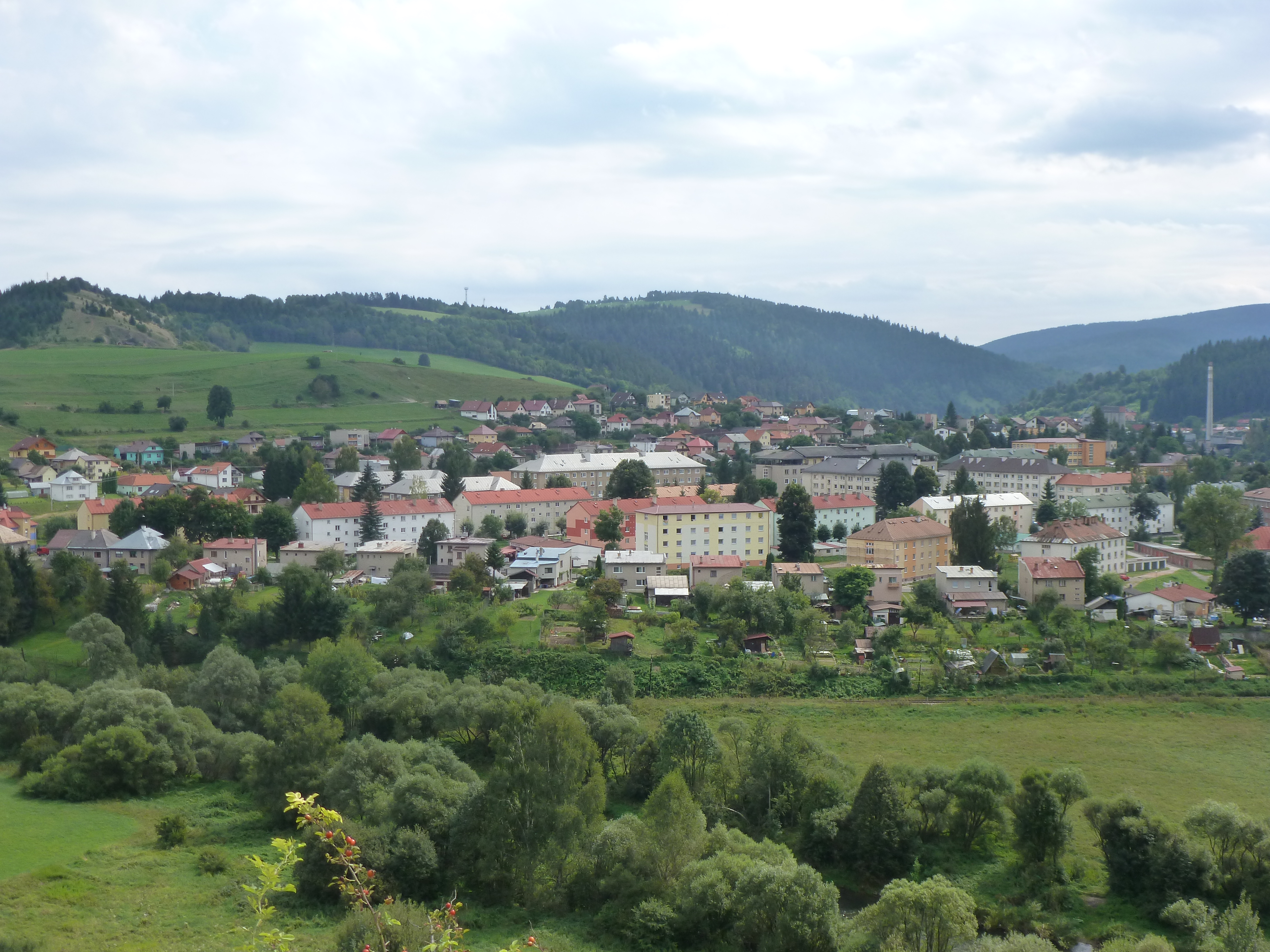

- Flag

- Location of Valaská in the Banská Bystrica Region Location of Valaská in Slovakia
- Coordinates: 48.82°N 19.58°E
- Country: Slovakia
- Region: Banská Bystrica Region
- District: Brezno District
- First mentioned: 1528

Area
  - Total: 63.33 km^{2} (24.45 sq mi)
- Elevation: 489 m (1,604 ft)

Population (2025)
  - Total: 3,267
- Time zone: UTC+1 (CET)
  - Summer (DST): UTC+2 (CEST)
- Postal code: 976 46
- Area code: +421 48
- Vehicle registration plate (until 2022): BR
- Website: www.valaska.sk

Valaská (Hungarian: Garamolaszka) is a village and municipality in Brezno District, in the Banská Bystrica Region of central Slovakia.

== Geography ==
The municipality lies at an altitude of 489 metres (1,604 ft) and covers an area of 63.33 km^{2} (24.45 sq mi) (2025).

== Nature ==
The Horné Lazy nature reserve is located north of the village.

== Population ==
Population statistic (10 years)
Year	1995	2005	2015	2025
Count	3833	3890	3781	3267
Difference		+1.48%	−2.80%	−13.59%

Population statistic
Year	2024	2025
Count	3336	3267
Difference		−2.06%

It has a population of 3267 people (31 December 2025).

=== Ethnicity ===
Census 2021 (1+ %)
Ethnicity	Number	Fraction
Slovak	3050	88.61%
Not found out	352	10.22%
Romani	82	2.38%
Total	3442	

In year 2021 was 3442 people by ethnicity 3050 as Slovak, 352 as Not found out, 82 as Romani, 33 as Czech, 5 as Hungarian, 5 as Other, 4 as German, 3 as Rusyn, 3 as Russian, 1 as Jewish, 1 as Ukrainian, 1 as Polish, 1 as Moravian, 1 as Canadian and 1 as Greek.

Note on population: The difference values of population numbers in the table "Population statistic" and in the sections "Ethnicity" & "Religion" is caused by the use of various statistical methods.

=== Religion ===
Census 2021 (1+ %)
Religion	Number	Fraction
Roman Catholic Church	1703	49.48%
None	1139	33.09%
Not found out	408	11.85%
Evangelical Church	77	2.24%
Total	3442	

In year 2021 was 3442 people by religion 1703 from Roman Catholic Church, 1139 from None, 408 from Not found out, 77 from Evangelical Church, 27 from Christian Congregations in Slovakia, 21 from Greek Catholic Church, 19 from Jehovah's Witnesses, 11 from Ad hoc movements, 6 from Other, 5 from Eastern Orthodox Church, 4 from Old Catholic Church, 4 from Paganism and natural spirituality, 4 from Other and not ascertained christian church, 4 from United Methodist Church, 2 from Calvinist Church, 2 from Islam, 2 from Bahá'i Community, 1 from Jewish community, 1 from Church of Jesus Christ of Latter-day Saints, 1 from Buddhism and 1 from Apostolic Church.
