= Dereše =

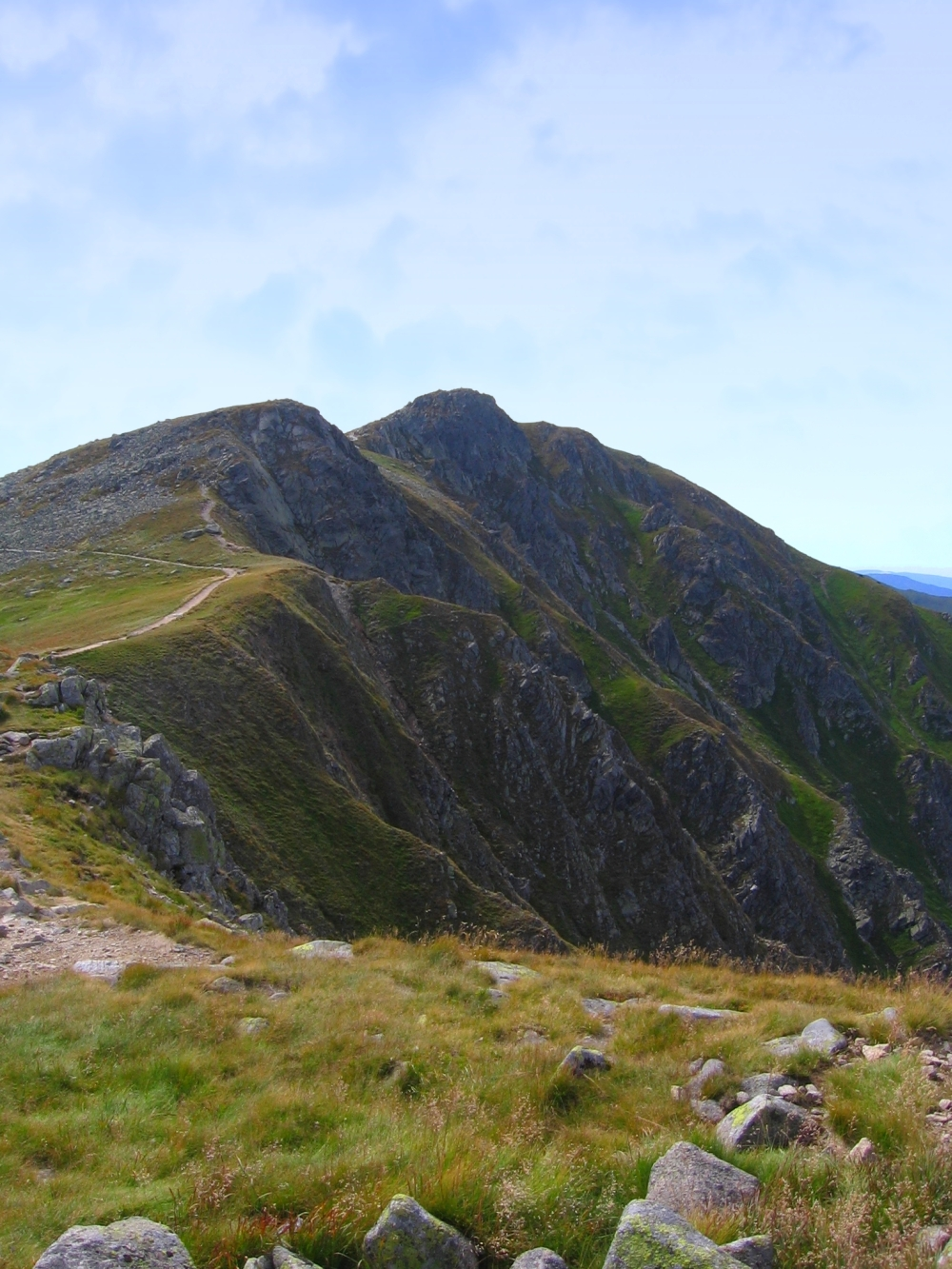
- Dereše

Highest point
- Elevation: 2,004 m (6,575 ft)
- Isolation: 1.34 km (0.83 mi) to Chopok
- Coordinates: 48°56′26″N 19°34′22″E

Geography
- Location within Slovakia
- Location: Slovakia
- Parent range: Low Tatra

Climbing
- Easiest route: walk from Chopok

Dereše (Hungarian: Deres(original name), 2,004 m) is the third highest peak of the Low Tatra range, in central Slovakia. It is located on the way between the highest mountains of the range, Ďumbier and Chopok in the east, and Chabenec in the west. Dereše is a popular destination among alpine skiers despite a high risk of avalanches. The scenic trail on the top of Dereše is surrounded by hundreds of cairns.
