= Važecká Cave =

Cave in Slovakia

Coordinates: 49°3′20″N 19°58′19″E

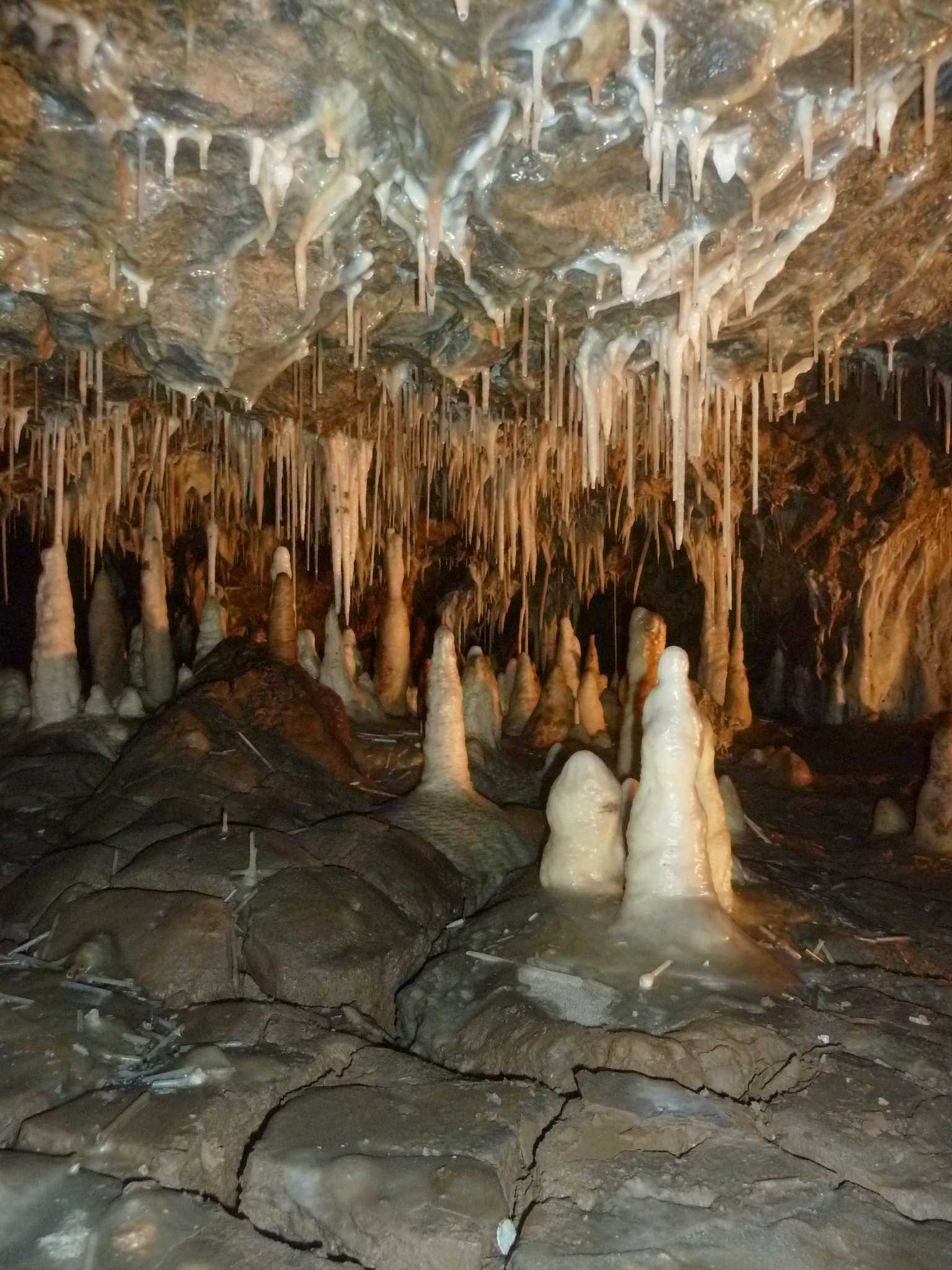
Važecká Cave

Važecká Cave (Slovak: Važecká jaskyňa, and Hungarian: Vázseci-barlang) is a 530-metre (1,740 ft) long stalactite limestone cave. Lying at an elevation of 784 metres (2,572 ft), it is located near the village of Važec, in the Liptov Basin, near the Biely Váh River, on the northern edge of the Low Tatra mountain range in northern Slovakia. The cave was discovered in 1922. Of the 530 m total length, 235 metres (771 ft) are open to the public.

Although it is one of the shorter caves, it is known for its rich stalactite decoration, as well as for its cave fauna.
