= Christmas Market, Bratislava =

Christmas market in Bratislava, Slovakia

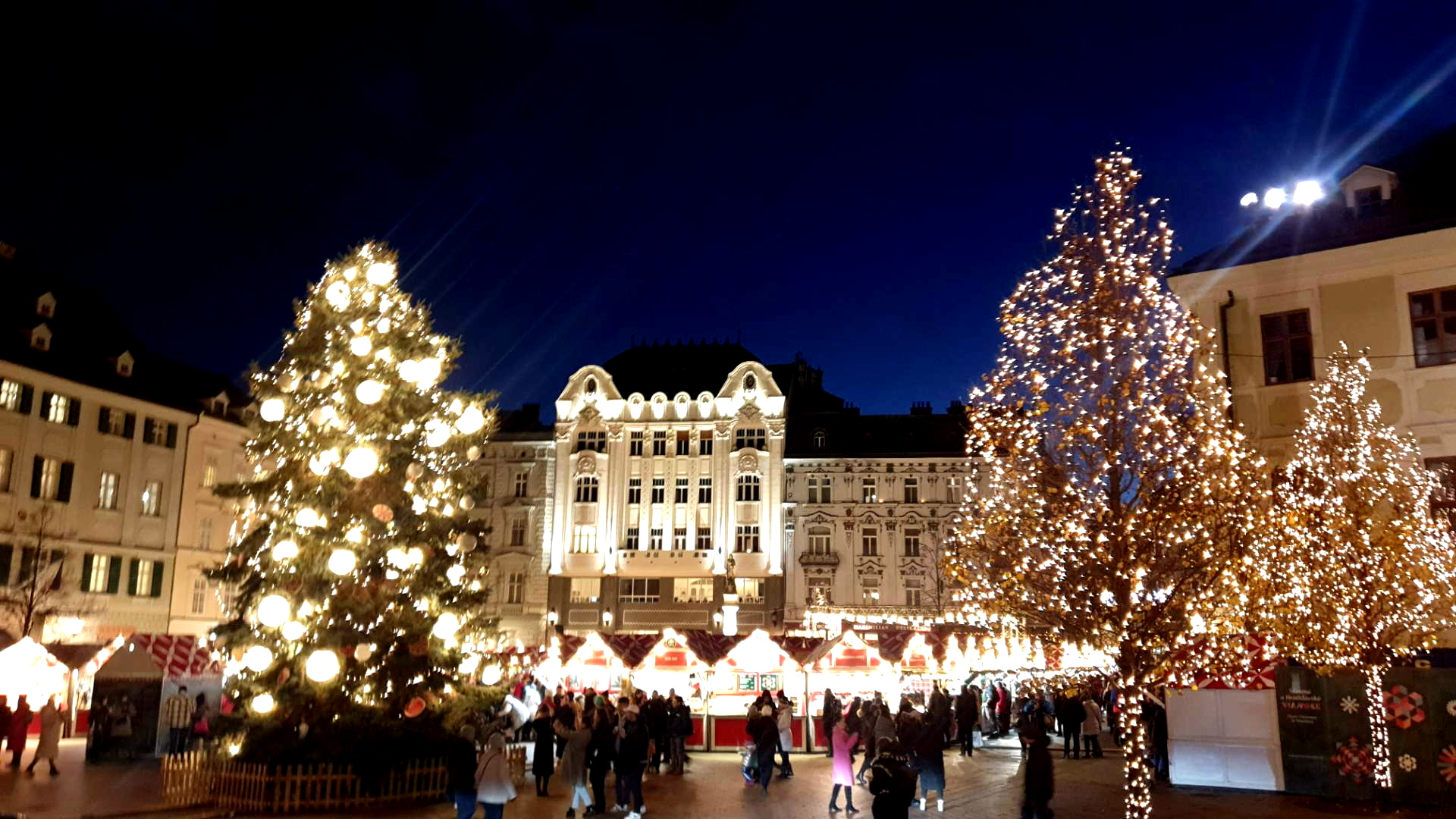
A night view of Hlavné vianočné trhy ("Main Christmas Markets") at Main Square, Bratislava (2023)

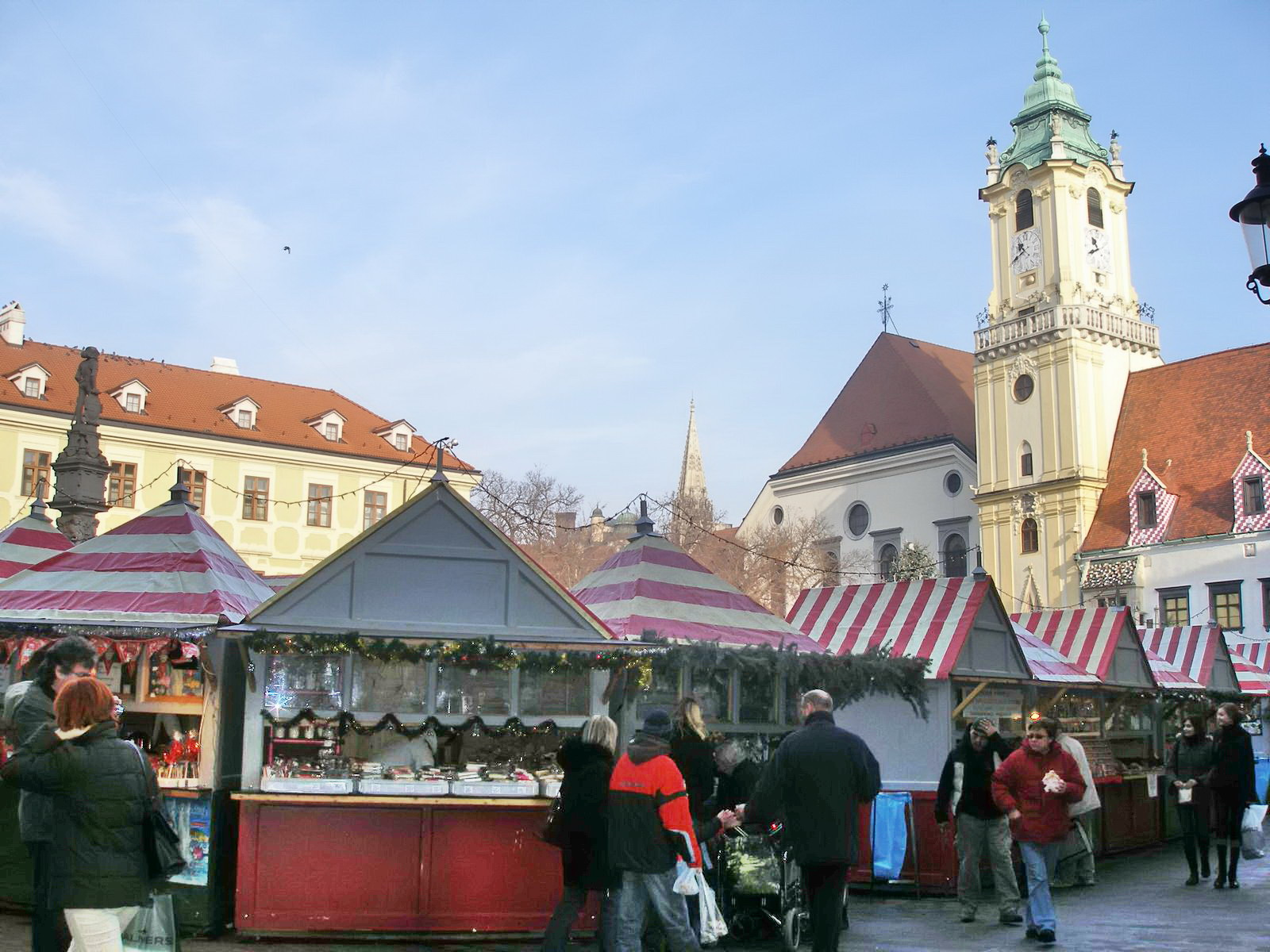
A day view of Hlavné vianočné trhy ("Main Christmas Markets") stalls (2007)

Bratislava Christmas Market(s) (Slovak: Bratislavské vianočné trh(y)), known as Bratislavské Vianoce (literally "Bratislava Christmas"), since 1993, are annual large Christmas markets in Old Town, Bratislava between the end of November and 23 . After a break for Christmas Eve and Christmas Day, the market continued until January 6th.

It is divided into Staromestské vianočné trhy (literally "Old Town Christmas Markets") at Hviezdoslav Square and Hlavné vianočné trhy (literally "Main Christmas Markets") at Main Square and Primate's Square. There are also Stredoveké vianočné trhy (literally "Medieval Christmas Markets") in the Bratislava Castle courtyard.
