= Ďumbier =

Mountain in Slovakia

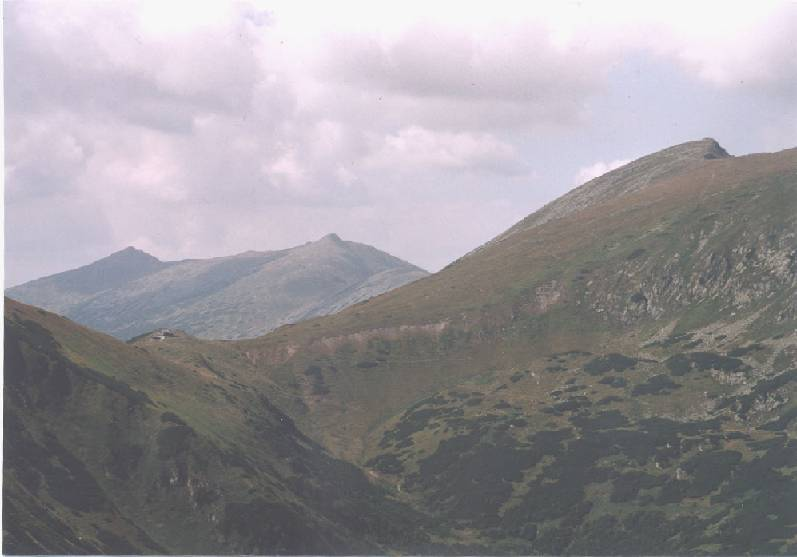
- Ďumbier

Highest point
- Elevation: 2,043 m (6,703 ft)
- Prominence: 1,181 m (3,875 ft)
- Isolation: 26.99 km (16.77 mi) to Baranec
- Listing: Ribu
- Coordinates: 48°56′11.4″N 19°38′25.3″E

Geography
- Location within Slovakia
- Location: Slovakia
- Parent range: Low Tatra

Climbing
- First ascent: 18th century
- Easiest route: Hike

Ďumbier (2,043 m or 6,703 ft) is the highest mountain in the Low Tatra range, in central Slovakia. Despite the remains of medieval mines (gold, iron, antimony), the massif is now protected as a part of the Low Tatras National Park.

The easily accessible summit offers a scenic view of High Tatra, Liptov and the valley of Hron. A chalet called Chata M. R. Štefánika is situated under the summit (1,740 m). Ďumbier, as well as the nearby Chopok mountain, can be reached following the hiking trails either from the north (from the Demänovská dolina and Jánska dolina valleys) or from the south (from the bus stop Trangoška).

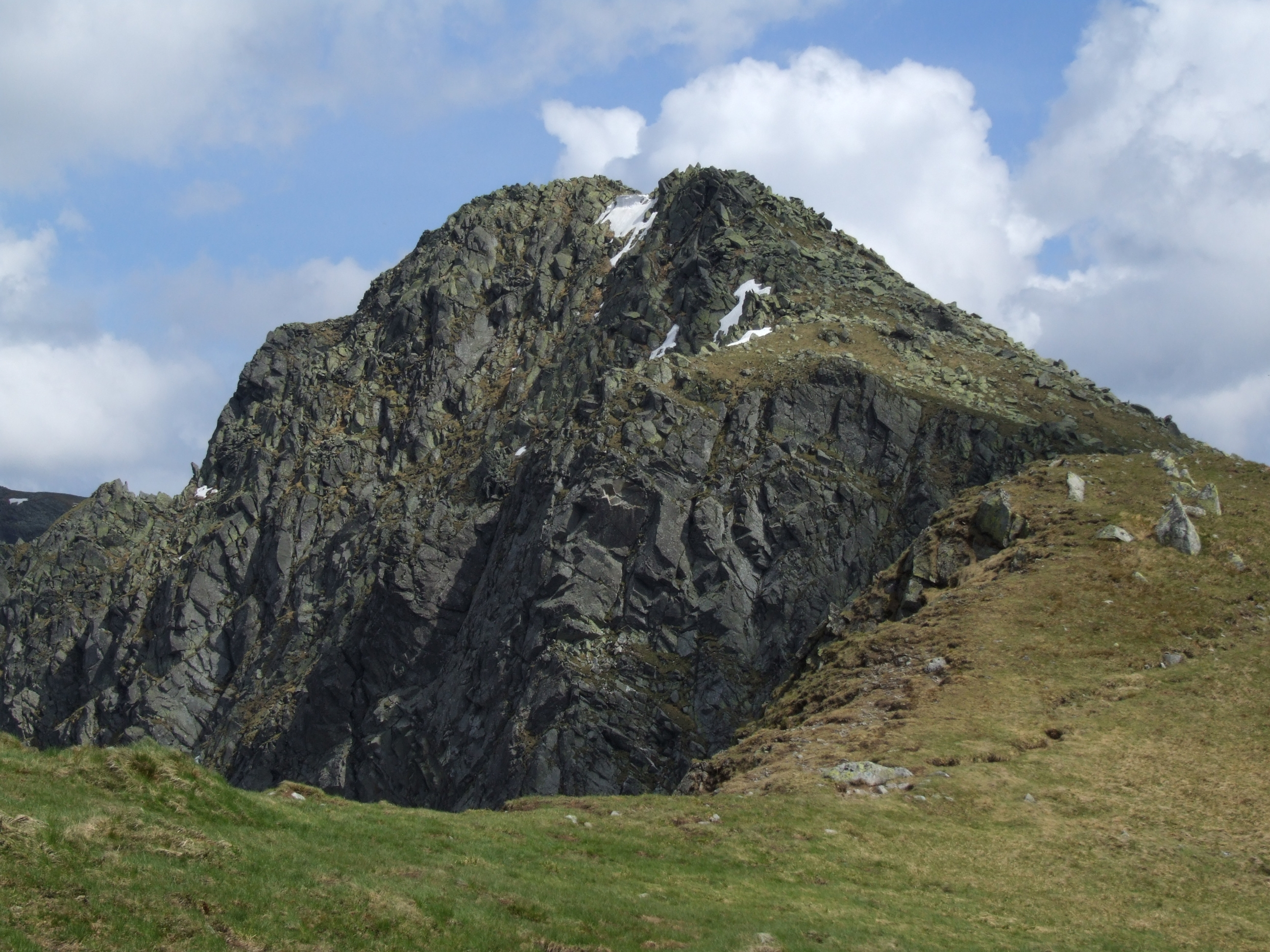
Ďumbier from mountain Krúpova hoľa
