= Liptov =

Historic region in Slovakia

Coordinates: 49.0806°N 19.6222°E

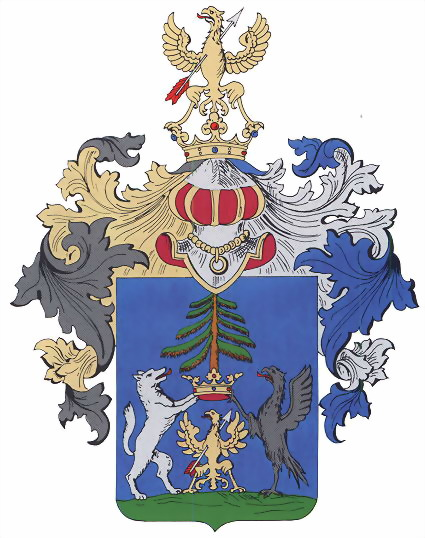
Coat of Arms of Liptov

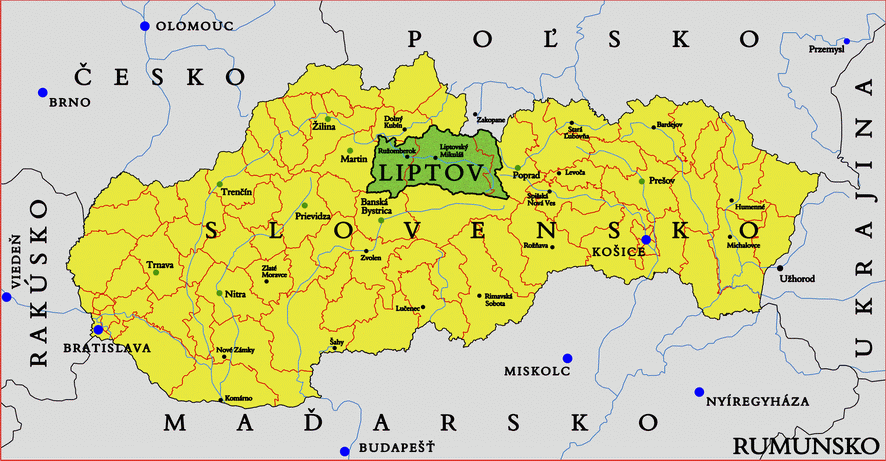
The extent of the Liptov region within present-day Slovakia.

Liptov (Slovak pronunciation: [ˈliptɔw]) is a historical and geographical region in central Slovakia with around 140,000 inhabitants. The area is also known by the German name Liptau, the Hungarian Liptó, the Latin name Liptovium and the Polish Liptów.

== Etymology ==
The name is derived from some Slavic personal name beginning with Ľub- with a possessive suffix -ov. Ľúbiť – to love, derived personal names are Ľubomír, Ľubota (potentially the Czech House of Lubota) and others. E.g. Ľubtov (pronunciation Ľuptov) - Ľubota's castle or his territory. The form Ľuptov has been preserved in Orava and in a frequent Slovak surname Ľupták (Liptovian).

== History ==
The first known inhabitants came to Liptov during the Neolithic age around 6000 years ago. Celts represent an important time period of Liptov during the Iron Age. The Celtic tribal village can be seen in the archaeological site of Havránok near Liptovský Mikuláš. The first settlements of Slavic people in Liptov region began approximately in the 6th century. The first written evidence about Liptov came from 1231 AD during the rule of the Hungarian king Andrew II when Liptov was a permanent comitatus (county) of the Kingdom of Hungary. The dissolution of Austro-Hungarian monarchy in 1918 led to the creation of Czechoslovakia as a successor country, including Liptov as one of the integral regions of the new state. After the dissolution of Czechoslovakia in 1993, Liptov became the region of present-day Slovakia.

There are currently three remains of castles that were built in the Liptov region. They are the Likava castle, the Liptov castle, and the Liptovský Hrádok castle. Liptov is also a place where the legendary Slovak figure of the 17th and 18th century, Juraj Jánošík, was sentenced to death.

== Geography ==
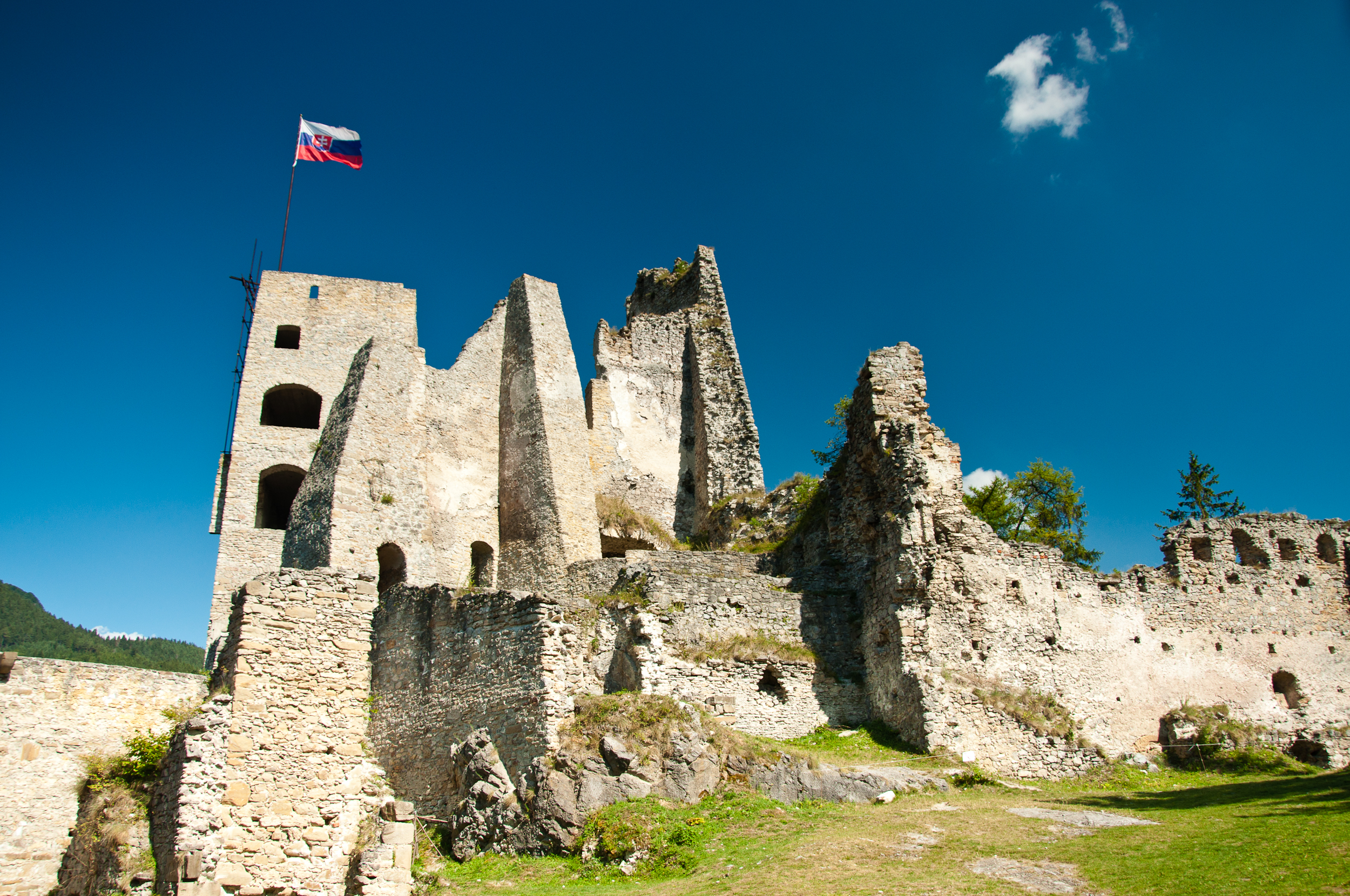
Likava Castle, Likavka

Historical and cultural centres of Liptov are the towns of Liptovský Mikuláš, Ružomberok and Liptovský Hrádok. Liptov is surrounded by the highest mountains in Slovakia: High Tatras, West Tatras and Chočské vrchy from the north, Low Tatras from the south and Greater Fatra from the west. The longest Slovak river of Váh runs through Liptov and fills the important water reservoir of Liptovská Mara. There are two Slovak national parks with the highest level of protection in the territory of Liptov, they are the Tatra National Park and the Low Tatras National Park.

== Tourism ==
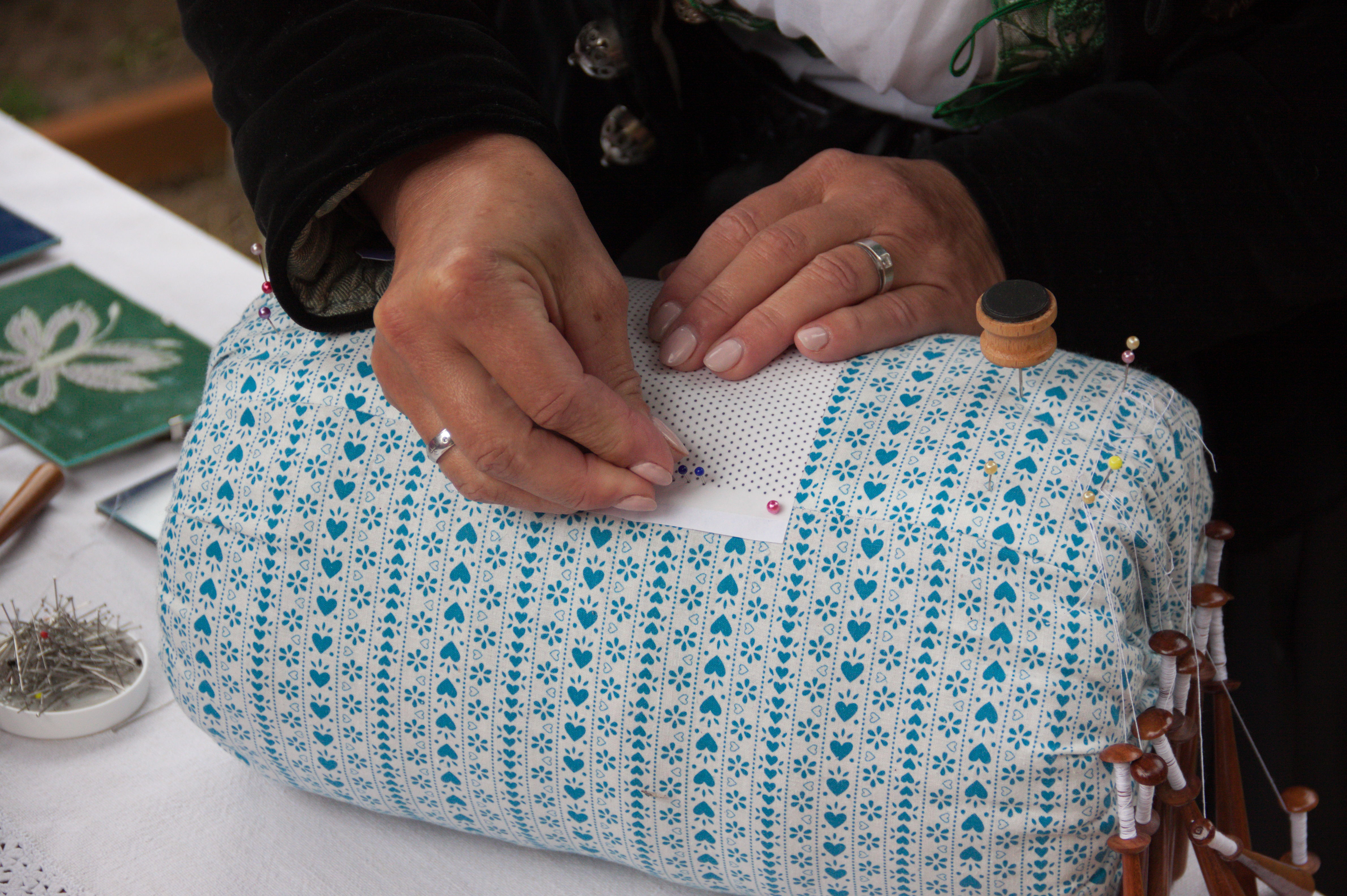
Bobbin lace making Myjava-Festival Slovakia

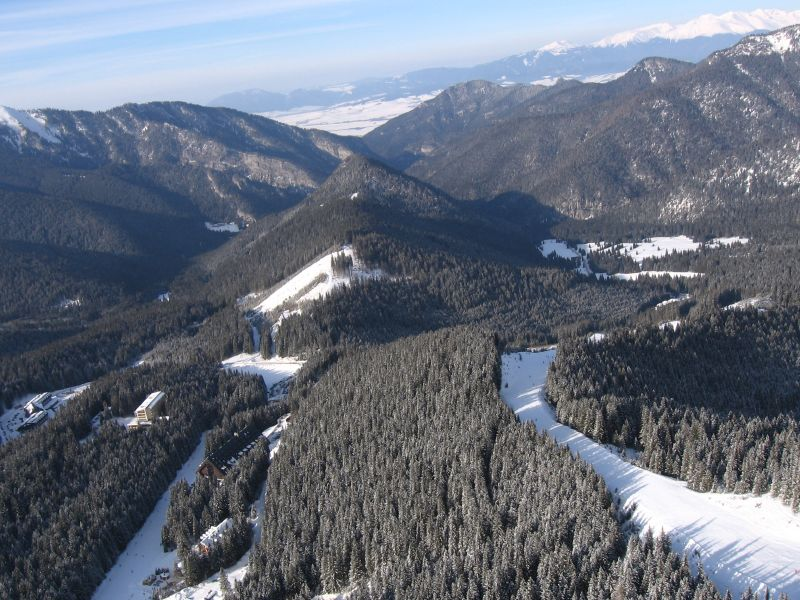
Jasná ski resort

Liptov is one of the most visited regions in Slovakia. There are four public caves: Demänovská Cave of Liberty, Demänovská Ice Cave, Važecká Cave and Stanišovská Cave, the biggest ski resort in Slovakia, Jasná, ski park Malinô Brdo, thermal parks of Tatralandia in Liptovský Mikuláš and Bešeňová and water worlds Gothal in Liptovská Osada and Thermal Paradise in Liptovský Ján as well as a UNESCO World Heritage Site of Vlkolínec. The list of museums and galleries include: Liptov Museum and Ľudovít Fulla Gallery in Ružomberok, Slovak Museum of Nature Protection and Spelology, Gallery of P.M. Bohúň and the Centre of Koloman Sokol in Liptovský Mikuláš. Liptov has a rich tradition of folklore culture. The annual folklore festival in the village of Východná is the biggest folklore event in Slovakia attracting thousands of visitors from all around Europe. A tradition of bobbin lace making to adorn traditional garments continues to be practiced today.

The Liptov region has a number of fine churches. In Svätý Kríž, south of the reservoir, is a large 'articular' wooden church belonging to the same group as the one in Hronsek, near Banská Bystrica (see the article in the section on Banská Bystrica Region). This is one of the largest wooden religious buildings in Europe and, like the buildings at Pribylina, was also rescued from the water (it was originally built in the now-vanished village of Paludza). And in the small village of Nižné Matiašovce, at the start of the precipitous route from Liptov to Zuberec (in the Orava valley), is a beautiful wooden-roofed church with defensive stone walls and bastions.

Liptov has two other big tourist draws: a pair of large geo-thermal aquaparks, at Bešeňová (near Ružomberok) and Tatralandia (near Liptovský Mikuláš); and the Demänovská valley.

On the way up the tree-lined Demänovská valley, are two large limestone cave complexes open to the public, the first of which is an ice cave (where the subterranean climate has formed a sort of underground glacier). The second, the Demänovská Cave of Freedom, is a huge complex of galleries featuring many stalactites and stalagmites.

== Gallery ==
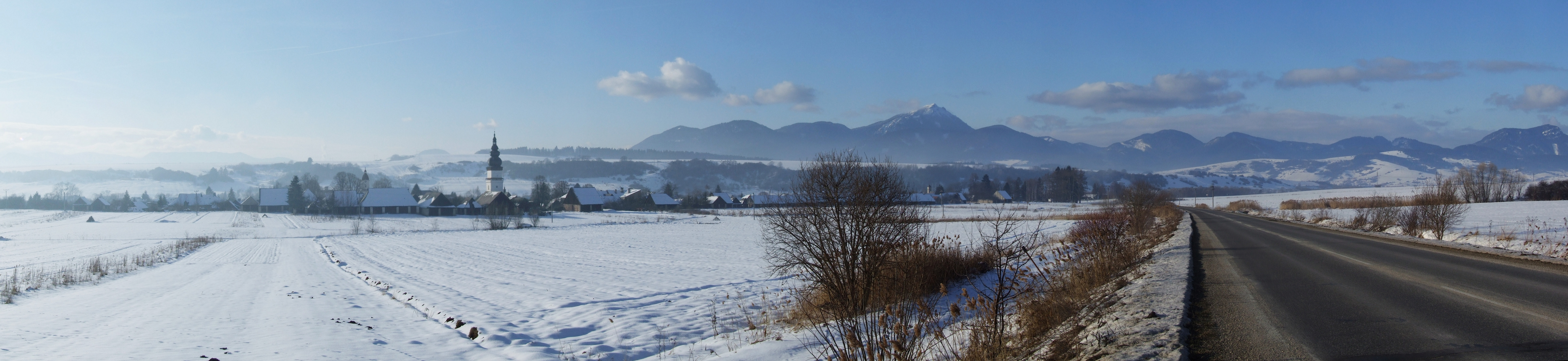
Panorama of Partizánska Ľupča in Liptov.

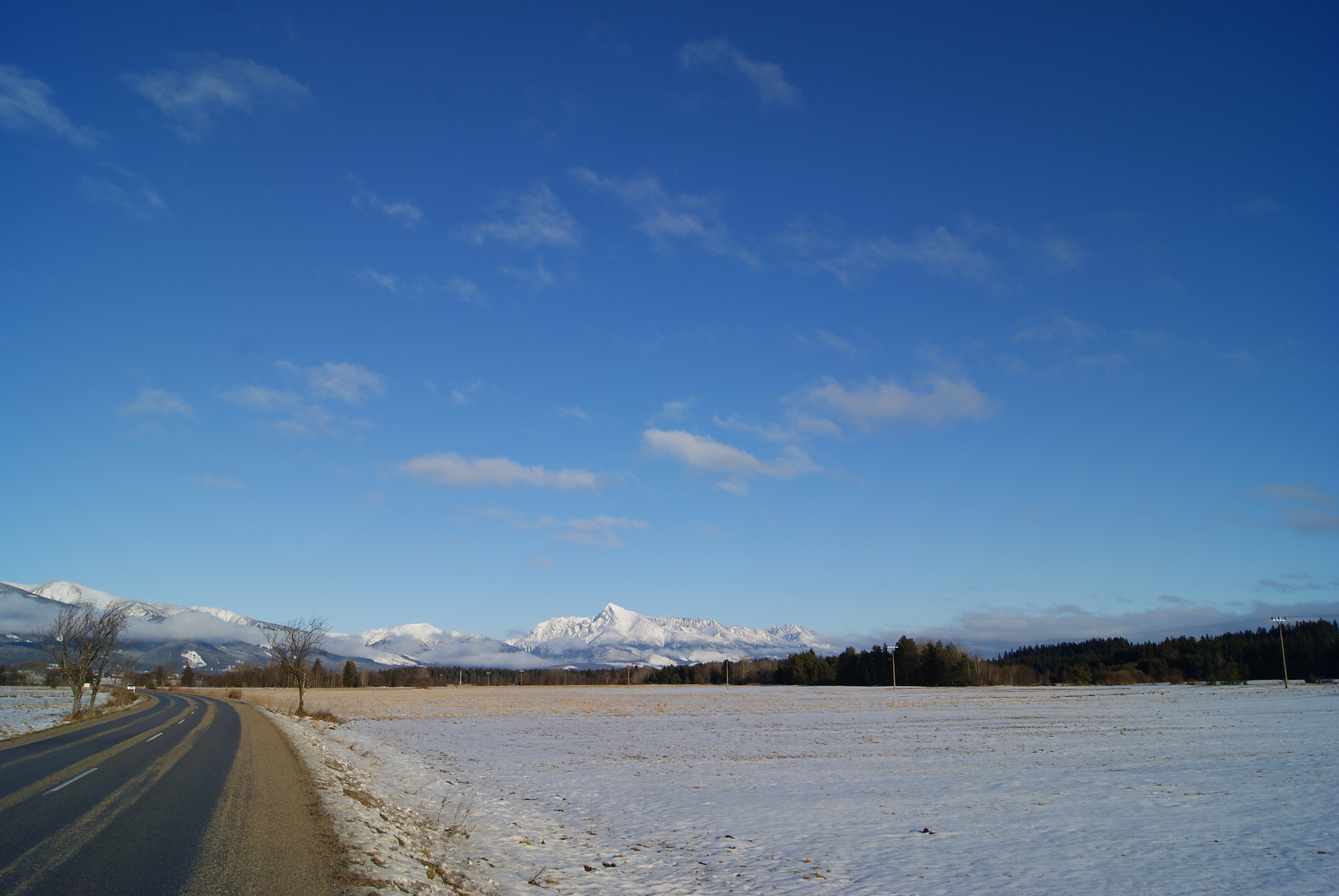
A peak of Kriváň in High Tatras as seen from Liptov.

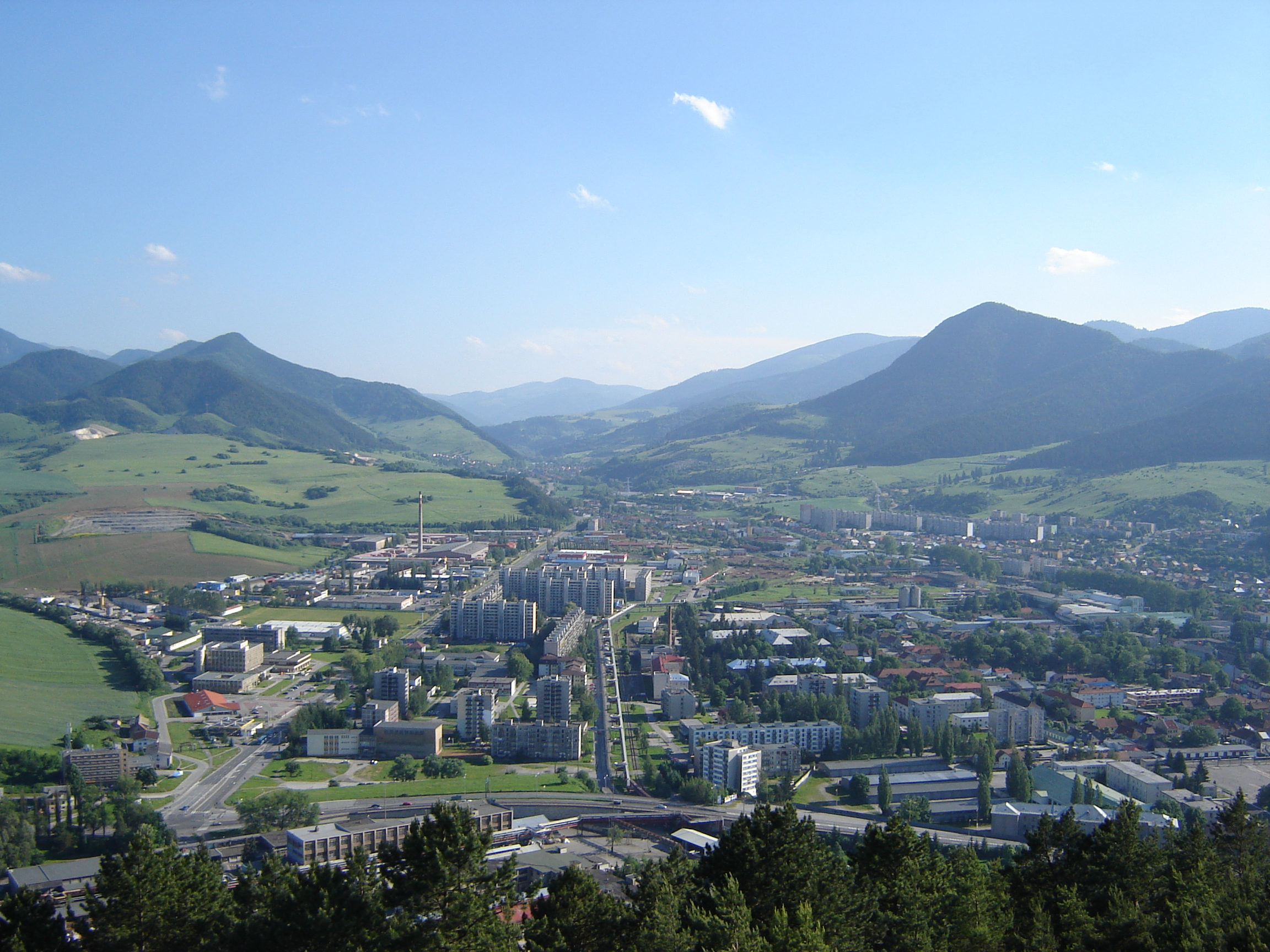
Ružomberok.

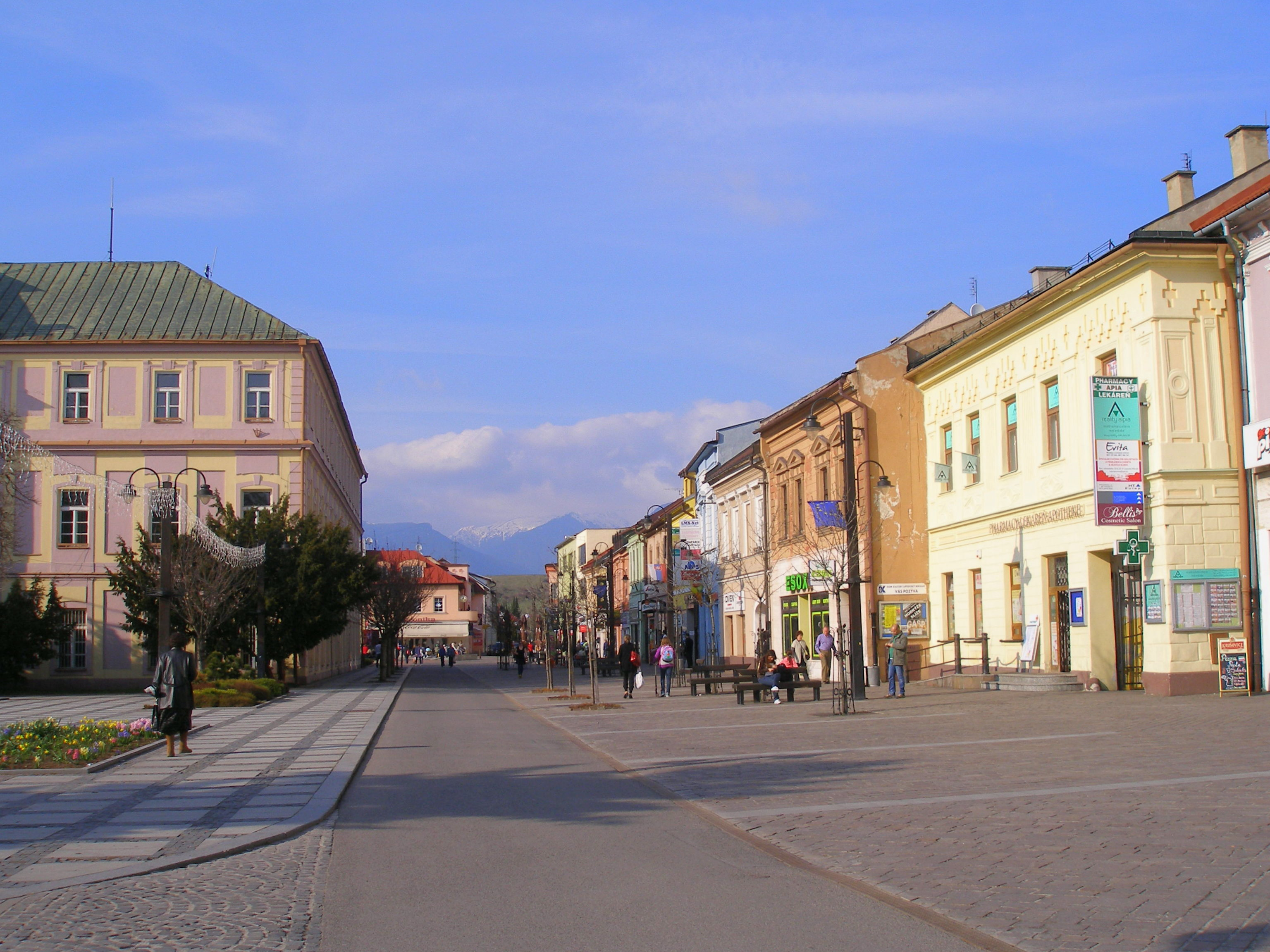
Liptovský Mikuláš

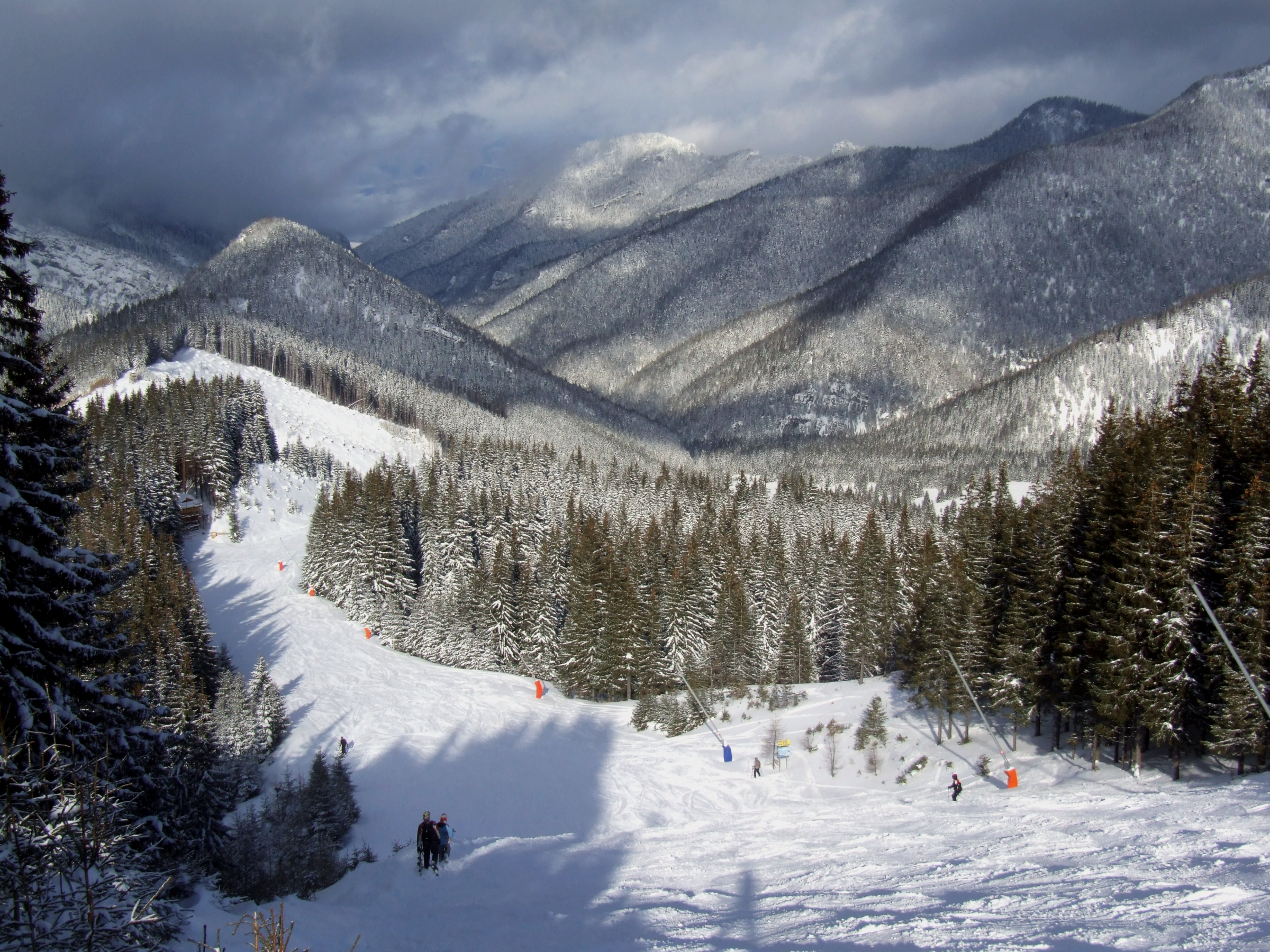
Jasná ski resort near Liptovský Mikuláš

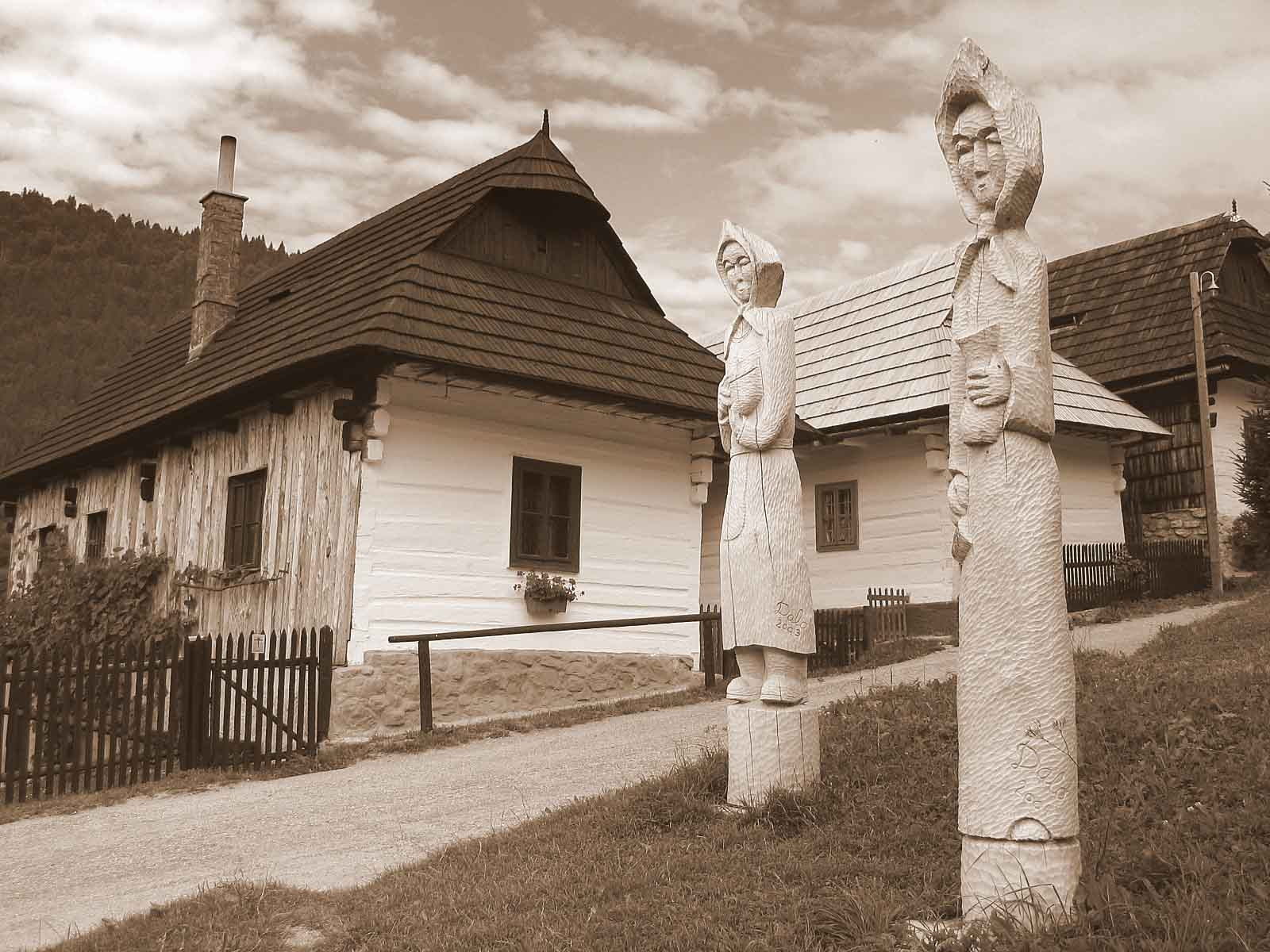
Vlkolínec is famous for its folk architecture.

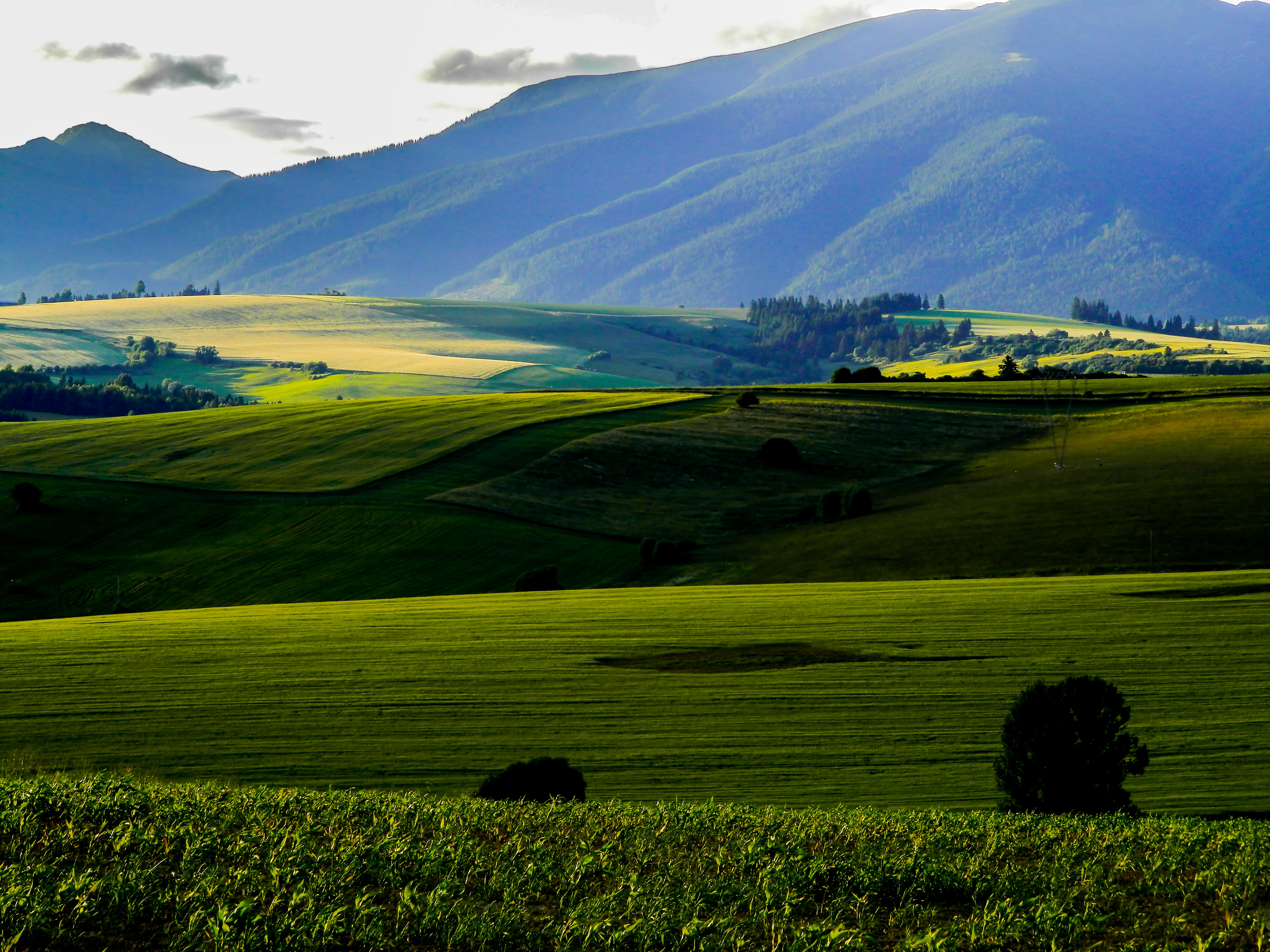
Nature of Liptov (summer).

== See also ==
- Liptauer (Liptov cheese)
