= Chopok =

Mountain peak in central Slovakia

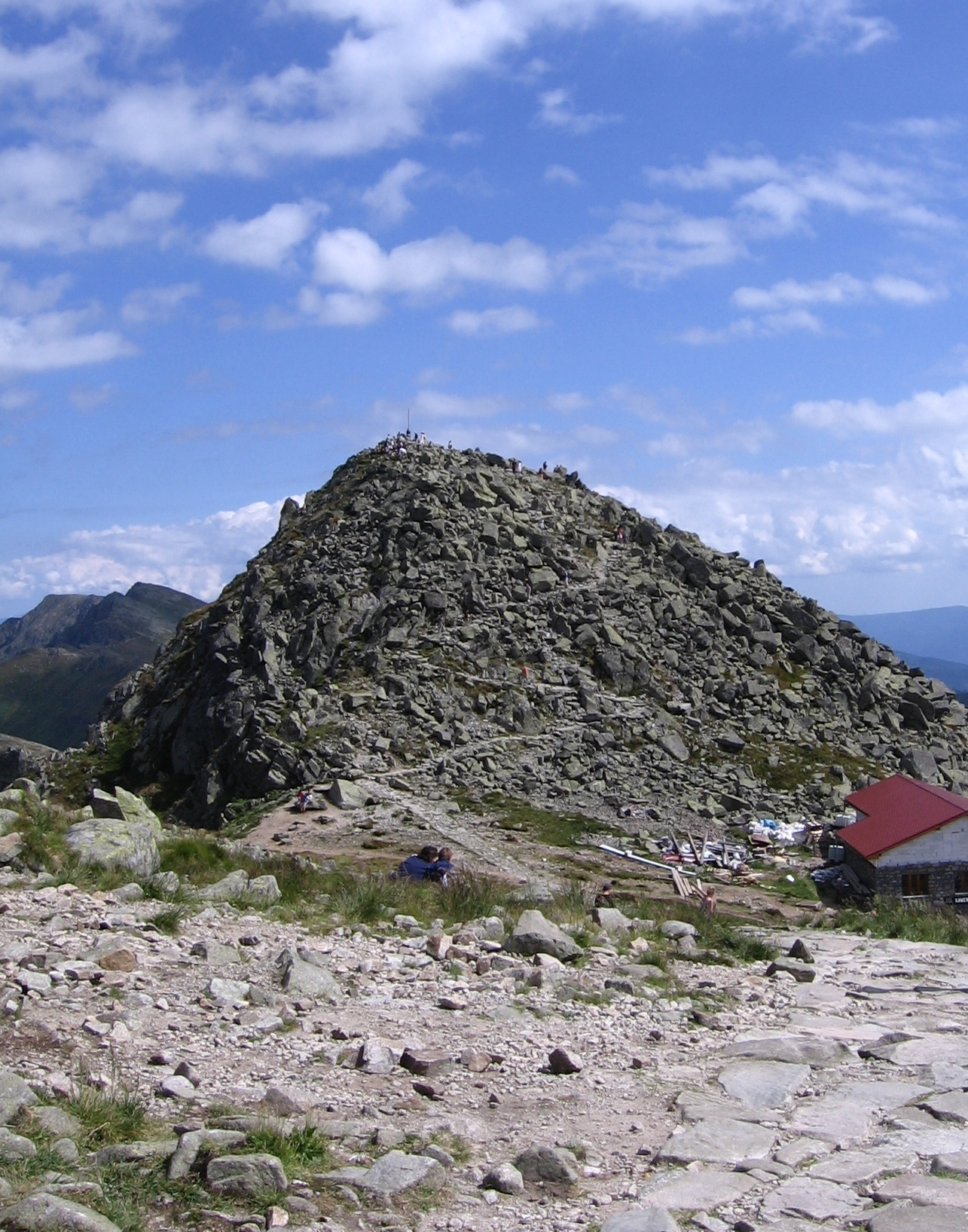
- Chopok peak, with the "Kamenná chata" chalet on the right

Highest point
- Elevation: 2,024 m (6,640 ft)
- Isolation: 3.45 km (2.14 mi) to Ďumbier
- Coordinates: 48°56′37″N 19°35′24″E

Geography
- Location within Slovakia
- Location: Slovakia
- Parent range: Low Tatra

Climbing
- Easiest route: Hike

Chopok (2,024 m) is the third highest peak of the Low Tatra range (just after the neighboring Ďumbier and Štiavnica mountains) in central Slovakia. The peak offers a panoramatic view of High Tatra, Liptov and the valley of Hron. There is a chalet (called Kamenná chata) located near the summit.

== Access ==
Chopok is situated on the E8 European walking route, between the Ďumbier and Dereše peaks. In addition to this east–west trail, the mountain can be also reached following the hiking trails either from the north (from the Demänovská Dolina valley) or from the south (from the bus stops Trangoška and Srdiečko). The highest points accessible by a chair lift are Chopok úboč (1834 m) on the northern slope and Kosodrevina (1494 m) on the southern slope.

== Climate ==
The average temperature is -1 °C (30 °F), with the highest temperature recorded 18 °C (66 °F) and the lowest recorded temperature -27 °C (-18 °F). The average temperature in January is -8 °C (17 °F) and in July 6 °C (44 °F). Chopok is the windiest place with a weather station in Slovakia.

Climate data for Chopok (1991−2020)
Month	Jan	Feb	Mar	Apr	May	Jun	Jul	Aug	Sep	Oct	Nov	Dec	Year
Record high °C (°F)	6.9 (44.4)	7.2 (45.0)	8.8 (47.8)	12.6 (54.7)	17.9 (64.2)	20.6 (69.1)	22.2 (72.0)	22.0 (71.6)	19.4 (66.9)	15.5 (59.9)	14.4 (57.9)	9.9 (49.8)	22.2 (72.0)
Mean daily maximum °C (°F)	−5.0 (23.0)	−5.4 (22.3)	−3.3 (26.1)	1.2 (34.2)	5.8 (42.4)	9.7 (49.5)	11.6 (52.9)	11.9 (53.4)	7.0 (44.6)	3.3 (37.9)	−0.7 (30.7)	−4.1 (24.6)	2.7 (36.9)
Daily mean °C (°F)	−7.8 (18.0)	−8.1 (17.4)	−6.2 (20.8)	−1.7 (28.9)	3.0 (37.4)	6.6 (43.9)	8.5 (47.3)	8.8 (47.8)	4.4 (39.9)	0.8 (33.4)	−3.2 (26.2)	−6.6 (20.1)	−0.1 (31.8)
Mean daily minimum °C (°F)	−10.4 (13.3)	−10.7 (12.7)	−8.8 (16.2)	−4.1 (24.6)	0.6 (33.1)	4.1 (39.4)	5.9 (42.6)	6.3 (43.3)	2.1 (35.8)	−1.6 (29.1)	−5.5 (22.1)	−9.2 (15.4)	−2.6 (27.3)
Record low °C (°F)	−27.9 (−18.2)	−26.8 (−16.2)	−23.5 (−10.3)	−17.7 (0.1)	−11.5 (11.3)	−5.1 (22.8)	−2.6 (27.3)	−3.0 (26.6)	−7.1 (19.2)	−14.9 (5.2)	−18.7 (−1.7)	−25.4 (−13.7)	−27.9 (−18.2)
Average precipitation mm (inches)	79.1 (3.11)	86.2 (3.39)	93.9 (3.70)	78.6 (3.09)	113.5 (4.47)	135.4 (5.33)	156.5 (6.16)	109.5 (4.31)	95.7 (3.77)	82.6 (3.25)	73.9 (2.91)	82.9 (3.26)	1,187.8 (46.76)
Average precipitation days (≥ 1.0 mm)	13.6	13.4	14.4	12.7	15.4	14.8	14.8	11.4	11.6	12.2	12.8	13.9	161.1
Average snowy days	19.3	18.5	19.6	16.1	9.0	2.6	0.8	1.0	5.0	8.8	14.2	18.8	133.5
Average relative humidity (%)	79.0	81.4	84.9	85.7	88.4	89.4	87.7	85.7	89.4	85.0	85.4	80.4	85.2
Mean monthly sunshine hours	92.1	90.2	114.2	146.0	150.9	150.1	171.9	176.4	117.6	106.2	76.0	81.5	1,473.1
Source: NOAA

== Skiing ==
The northern and southern slopes rank among the best skiing terrains in Slovakia. There are three ski areas on the northern slope, with 21 km of prepared skiing tracks, two cable cars, five chair lifts, and ten ski lifts. The southern slope has chair lift and six ski lifts. The mountain is popular among freeskiers. In addition, the Jasná ski center is situated at Chopok's northern base and the Srdiečko and Tále ski resorts at the southern base.
