= Low Tatras =

Mountain range in Slovakia

Coordinates: 48°57′N 19°30′E

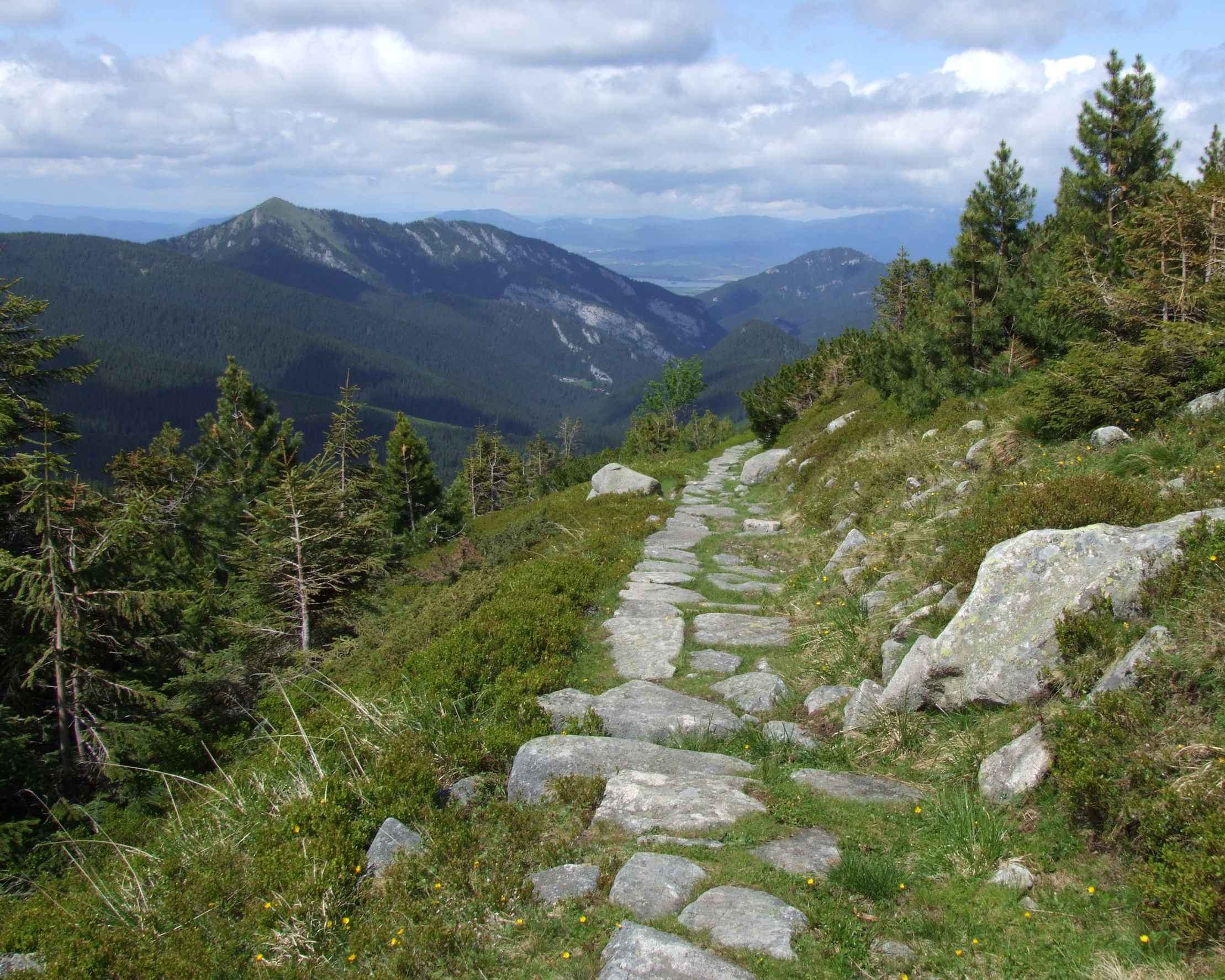
Blue trail of Chopok

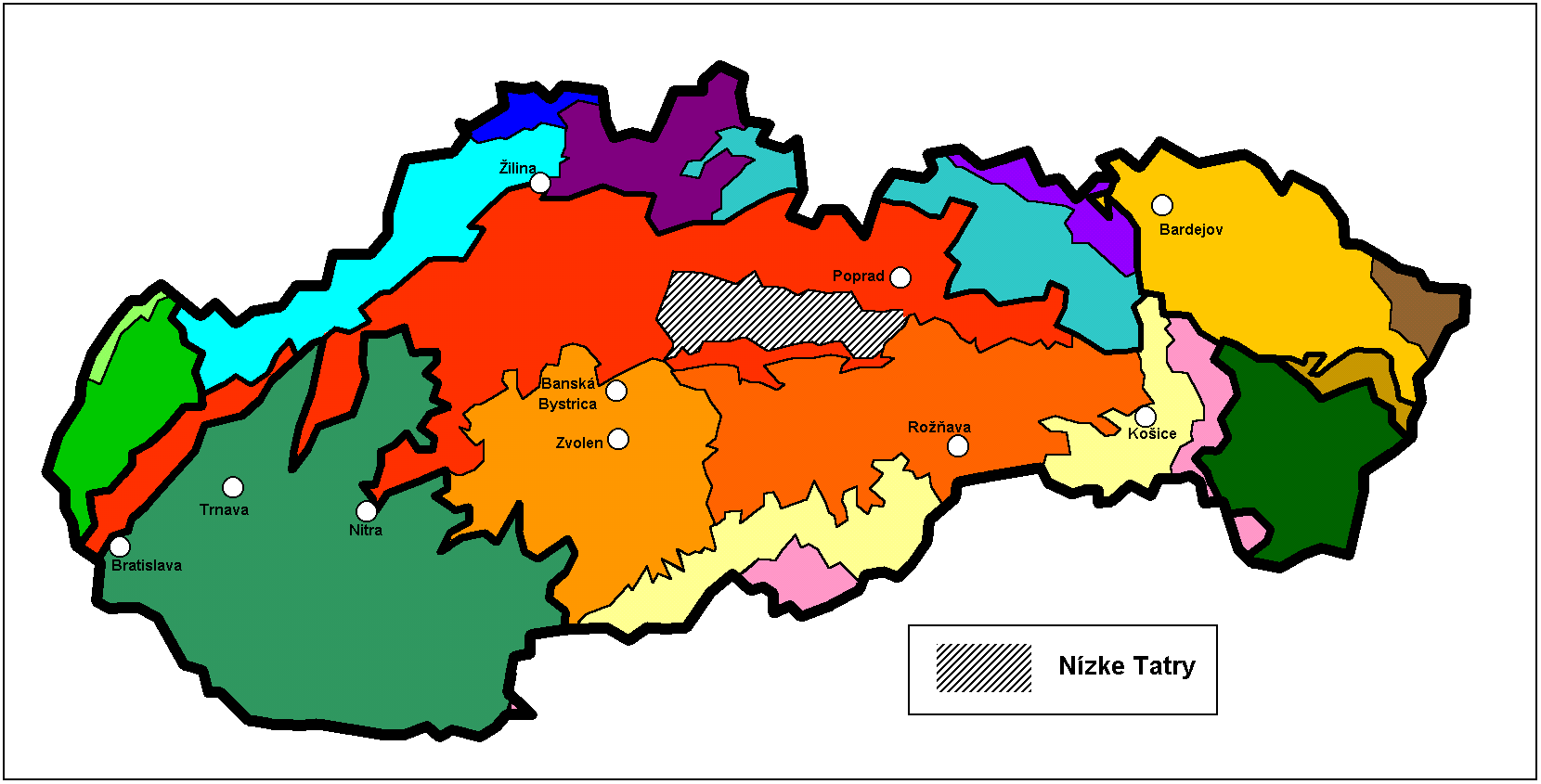
Location of the Low Tatras in Slovakia (in gray)

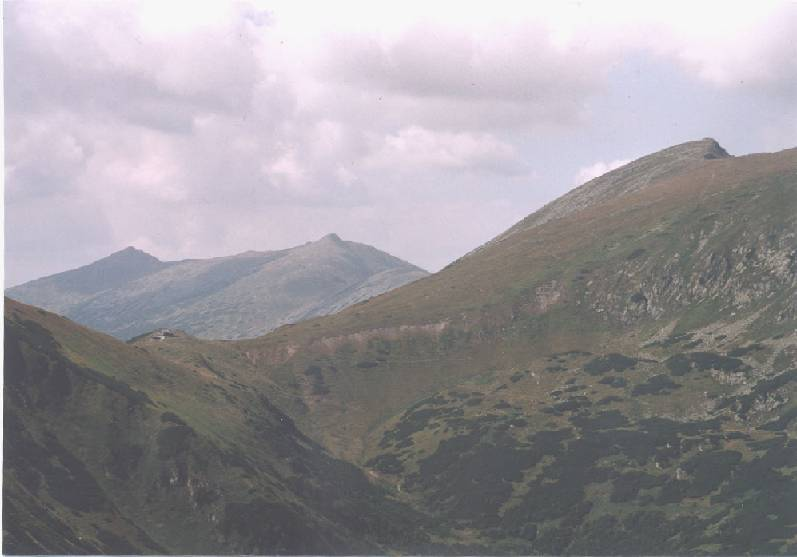
Mount Ďumbier (right) and Mount Chopok (middle)

The Low Tatras or Low Tatra (Slovak: Nízke Tatry; Hungarian: Alacsony-Tátra) is a mountain range of the Inner Western Carpathians in central Slovakia.

It is located south of the Tatras proper, from which it is separated by the valleys of the Váh and Poprad rivers (the Liptov-Spiš abasement). The valley formed by the Hron River is situated south of the Low Tatras range. The ridge runs west-eastwards and is about 80 km long.

The Čertovica pass divides the range into two parts. The highest peaks of the Low Tatras are located in its western part. Ďumbier is the highest mountain at 2,042 m AMSL. Its neighbour Chopok (2,024 m) is accessible by a chairlift, and it is the most visited place in the Low Tatras. Other peaks in the western part include Dereše (2,004 m) and Chabenec (1,955 m). The highest peak in the eastern part is Kráľova hoľa (1,946 m). The best viewpoints in western part are Veľká Chochuľa, Salatín, Chabenec, Skalka, Chopok, Ďumbier, Siná, Poludnica and Baba.

Several karst areas are situated in limestone and dolomite strata at the southern and northern edges of the main ridge, which is composed of granite and gneiss. Among many discovered caves, Bystrianska Cave (Bystrianska jaskyňa), Cave of Dead Bats (Jaskyňa mŕtvych netopierov), Demänovská jaskyňa Slobody, Demänová Ice Cave (Demänovská ľadová jaskyňa), and Važecká Cave (Važecká jaskyňa) are open to the public. The biggest canyon is Hučiaky under Salatín in Ludrová valley near Ružomberok (7 caves - not open for public), suitable for canyoning. The highest waterfall is under Brankov near Ružomberok - Podsuchá (55 m high), reachable by green marked footpath from Podsuchá (20 min). The biggest tarn is Vrbické pleso in the Demänovská dolina Valley.

The mountains are densely forested and their rich fauna includes bear, wolf, and lynx. The alpine meadows are the habitat of chamois.

== National Park ==
Most of the Low Tatras is protected by the Low Tatras National Park (Národný park Nízke Tatry; abbr. NAPANT), established in 1978. The area of the National Park is 728 km^{2} (281.08 mi^{2}) and the buffer zone takes 1,102 km^{2} (425.48 mi^{2}); 1,830 km^{2} (706.56 mi^{2}) together.

== Tourism ==
Tourism is very popular in the Tatras. During the winter there are several ski resorts in Low Tatras, for example Jasná, Mýto pod Ďumbierom, and Tále. Not only are these hubs of hiking and cross-country skiing trails, but Jasna is the largest ski resort in Central Europe and is served by the tourist town of Liptovsky Mikulas. Liptovsky Mikulas also offers a range of summer activities such as rafting, kayaking, boating on the lake, fishing, a hot springs aqua park and hiking. There are many places to stay, restaurants and bars in the town. The steep northern slopes of the range are popular with climbers. Other attractions include an 18-hole golf course near Tále. The Path of the heroes of Slovak national uprising follows the axis of the mountain range. At the very top there are several huts or hotels that can offer refuge to those who want to traverse the entire range from east to west. Low Tatras are also a popular destination for Czech tourists.

== Panorama views ==
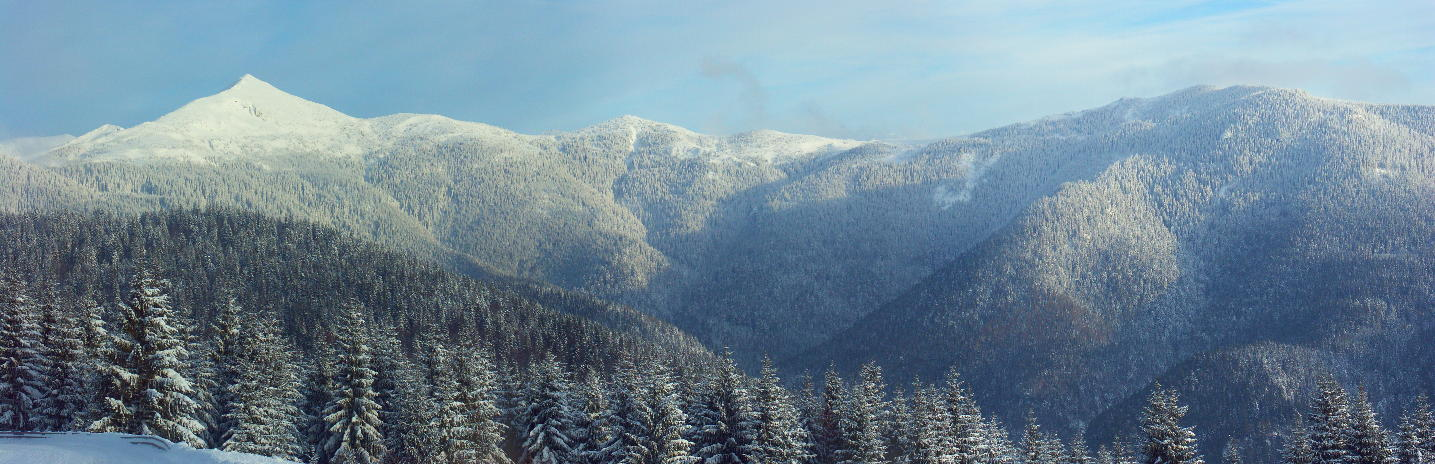
Low Tatras in winter

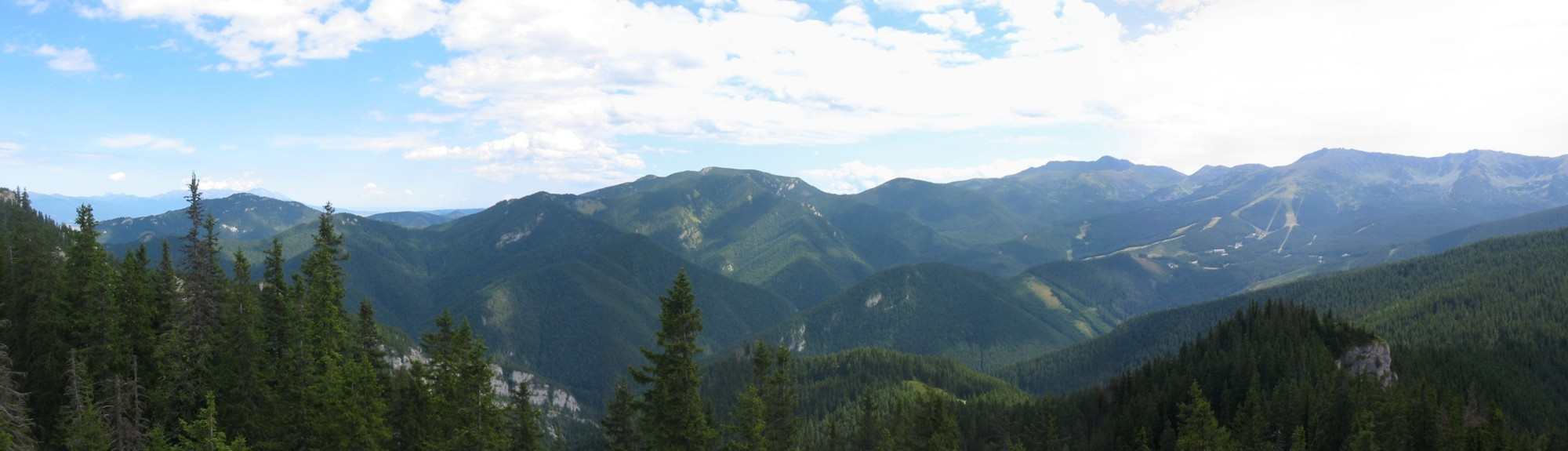
Demänovská dolina Valley

== See also ==
- Mountain Rescue Service (Slovakia)
