= Pavčina Lehota =

- Municipality
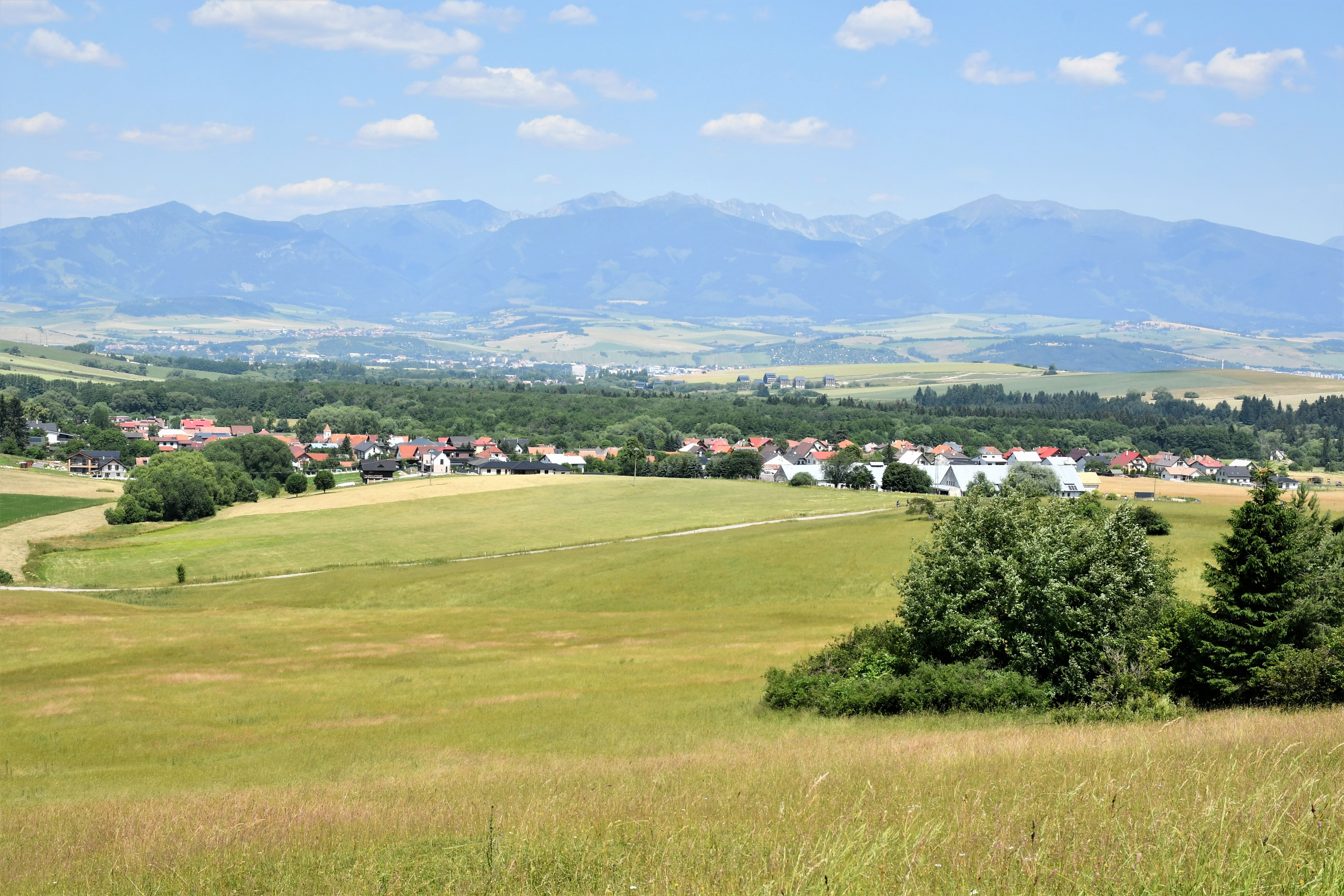

- Flag

- Location of Pavčina Lehota in the Žilina Region Location of Pavčina Lehota in Slovakia
- Coordinates: 49.03°N 19.57°E
- Country: Slovakia
- Region: Žilina Region
- District: Liptovský Mikuláš District
- First mentioned: 1365

Government
  - Mayor: Peter Pethö (Ind.)

Area
  - Total: 7.21 km^{2} (2.78 sq mi)
- Elevation: 710 m (2,330 ft)

Population (2025)
  - Total: 411
- Time zone: UTC+1 (CET)
  - Summer (DST): UTC+2 (CEST)
- Postal code: 310 1
- Area code: +421 44
- Vehicle registration plate (until 2022): LM
- Website: www.pavcinalehota.sk

Pavčina Lehota (Hungarian: Paucsinalehota or Pócsszabadja) is a village and municipality in Liptovský Mikuláš District in the Žilina Region of northern Slovakia. The village is known mainly for tourism because of its location among the famous attractions of large caves, aqua parks, ski resorts that surrounds the village.

== History ==
According to historical records the village was first mentioned in 1365. First settlement was discovered on the peak of Low Tatras called Jama (limestone plateau 1438 metres a.s.l.). In the course of later activities historians documented attempts to build at this place. Before the establishment of independent Czechoslovakia in 1918, Pavčina Lehota was part of Liptó County within the Kingdom of Hungary. From 1939 to 1945, it was part of the Slovak Republic.

=== Monuments ===
Village has ancient rustic bell tower from 1883. Located in the area of the local cemetery. It was modified in 1924. The wooden square single-room building has a tapered superstructure with a tent roof covered with shingles. Its copy is located in the Museum of the Liptov village in Pribylina.

== Geography ==
The municipality lies at an altitude of 710 metres (2,330 ft) and covers an area of 7.21 km^{2} (2.78 sq mi) (2025).

== Population ==
Population statistic (10 years)
Year	1995	2005	2015	2025
Count	346	340	371	411
Difference		−1.73%	+9.11%	+10.78%

Population statistic
Year	2024	2025
Count	401	411
Difference		+2.49%

It has a population of 411 people (31 December 2025).

=== Ethnicity ===
Census 2021 (1+ %)
Ethnicity	Number	Fraction
Slovak	371	94.4%
Not found out	14	3.56%
Czech	11	2.79%
Total	393	

In year 2021 was 393 people by ethnicity 371 as Slovak, 14 as Not found out and 11 as Czech.

Note on population: The difference values of population numbers in the table "Population statistic" and in the sections "Ethnicity" & "Religion" is caused by the use of various statistical methods.

=== Religion ===
Census 2021 (1+ %)
Religion	Number	Fraction
Evangelical Church	152	38.68%
None	145	36.9%
Roman Catholic Church	68	17.3%
Not found out	14	3.56%
Greek Catholic Church	4	1.02%
Total	393	

In year 2021 was 393 people by religion 152 from Evangelical Church, 145 from None, 68 from Roman Catholic Church, 14 from Not found out, 4 from Greek Catholic Church, 3 from Other and not ascertained christian church, 2 from Other, 1 from Paganism and natural spirituality, 1 from United Methodist Church, 1 from Buddhism, 1 from Baptists Church and 1 from Ad hoc movements.

== Surroundings of the village ==
=== Location ===
The village is located in the center of year-round tourism region Liptov right between the aqua-park Tatralandia and Jasna ski-resort in the northern part of the Low Tatras. It is therefore starting point for sports and tourism in Demänovská valley and ski resort Jasná dominated by peak Chopok (2024 metres a.s.l.) as well as the Low Tatras National Park. The village Pavčina Lehota is approximately 7 km distant from the city Liptovský Mikuláš.

=== Skiing ===
There are several ski resorts near Pavčina Lehota:

- Ski resort Jasná (the largest ski resort in Slovakia)
- Ski resort Žiarce (ski resort for pre-intermediate skiers)
- Ski resort Demänova (ski resort for beginners)

=== Aqua-parks and Spa ===
In the vicinity of Pavčina Lehota there are several water amusement and relaxation parks with thermal water

- Aquapark Tatralandia (the largest water park with the most water slides and water attractions in Slovakia)
- Aquapark Bešeňová (aquapark with red thermal water)
- Spa Lúčky

=== Caves ===
Demänovská Valley itself is widely known for extensive karst formations - especially the Cave of Liberty and the Ice Cave. The cave system in Demänovská Valley is opened to public and it includes about 30 caves that have been discovered so far including:

- Demänovská Cave of Freedom (most visited cave in Slovakia)
- Demänovská Ice Cave
- Cave of dead bats (Speleo hiking in cave terrain at the altitude of 1,750 m a.s.l.)
- Stanišovská cave

=== Hiking around the village ===
- Low Tatras National Park, which starts less than 500 meters from the village, offers a wide range of tourist opportunities:
- peak Chopok (2,024 m a.s.l.)
- peak Ďumbier (2,043 m a.s.l.)
- SNP trail along the ridge of the Low Tatras (762 km trail from south-west to north-east of Slovakia)
- Stefanik mountain cottage (1,740 m a.s.l.)
- Vrbicke Lake (1,113 m a.s.l.)
- Educational trail Around Pavčina Lehota (hiking, cross-country skiing, cycling)

Around the village there is a 10 km long educational trail with vertical elevation of 100 metres. This trail consists of 11 information and educational boards and few points of interests such as: ski and bobsleigh area Žiarce, lookout tower, geocaching cabinets, covered seating with fireplace toasting and places with unusual views. The nature trail will guide you through the fauna, flora, history and attractions of Pavčina Lehota.

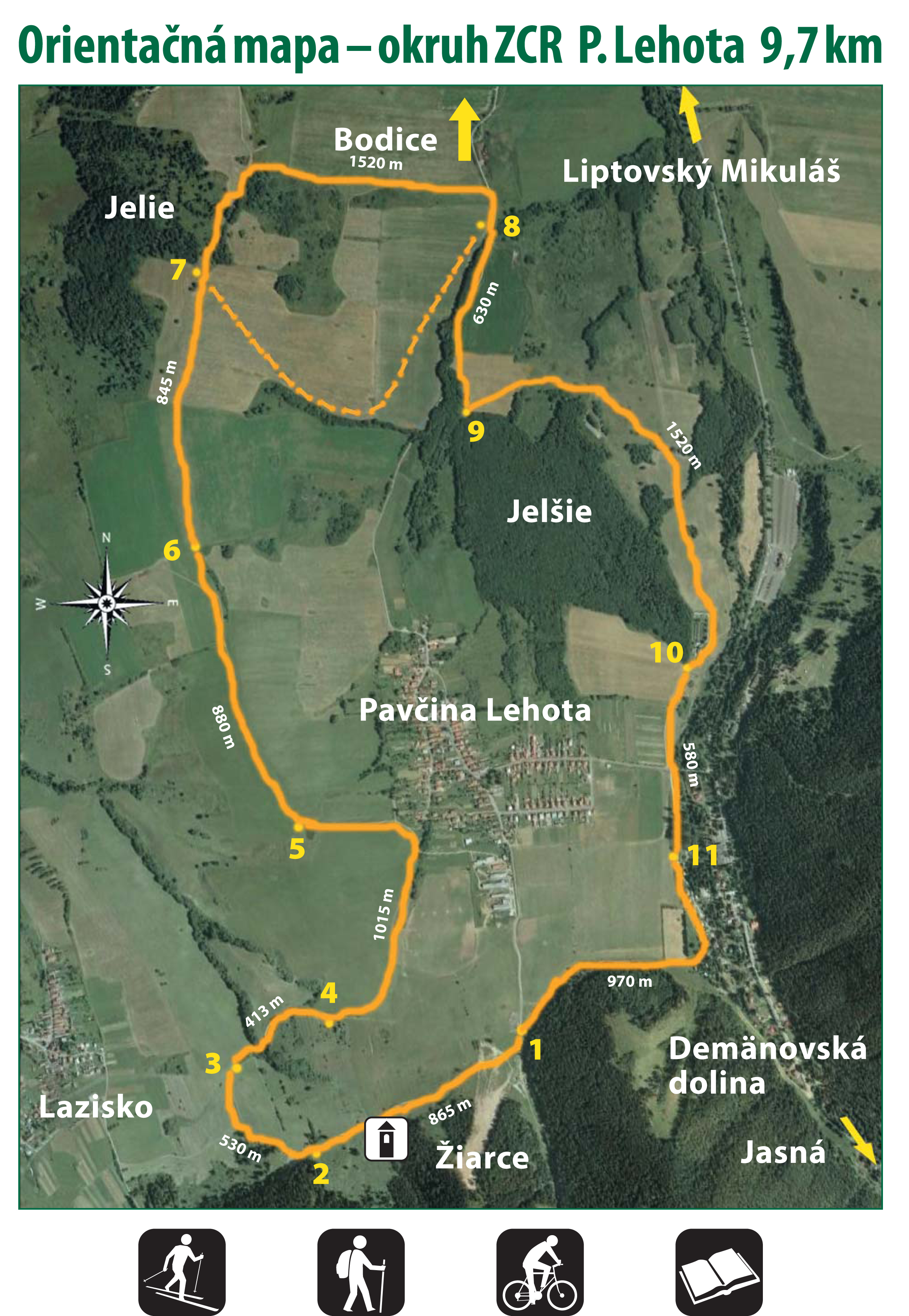
Map, educational trail, Pavčina Lehota

- Nature hiking trail "The story of water" Demänovská Valley (hiking)

The nature hiking trail in Demänovská Valley is only 1 km away from the village and winds along the River Demänovka. Educational boards visualize a map of more than 42 km long 9-storey cave labyrinth, as well as the fauna and flora of important protected areas of Demänovská valley. The Demänovský cave system is the longest cave system in Slovakia. The nature trail passes along the most well-known caves of Demänovská Valley: Demänovská Cave of Freedom and Demänovská Ice Cave

== Other tourist attractions around Pavčina Lehota ==
- Alpine Bobsleigh track and fun park Žiarce
- Downhill cycling - Jasná
- Open-air museum Vlkolínec
- Open-air museum of Liptov village Pribylina
- Downhill on scooters through Žiarska valley in the West Tatras or in Jánska valley in Low Tatras
- Outdoor natural climbing wall Machnatô
- Western city - Tatralandia
- Indoor skydiving in the wind tunnel - Tatralandia
- Indoor surfing - Tatralandia
- Contact zoo - Tatralandia

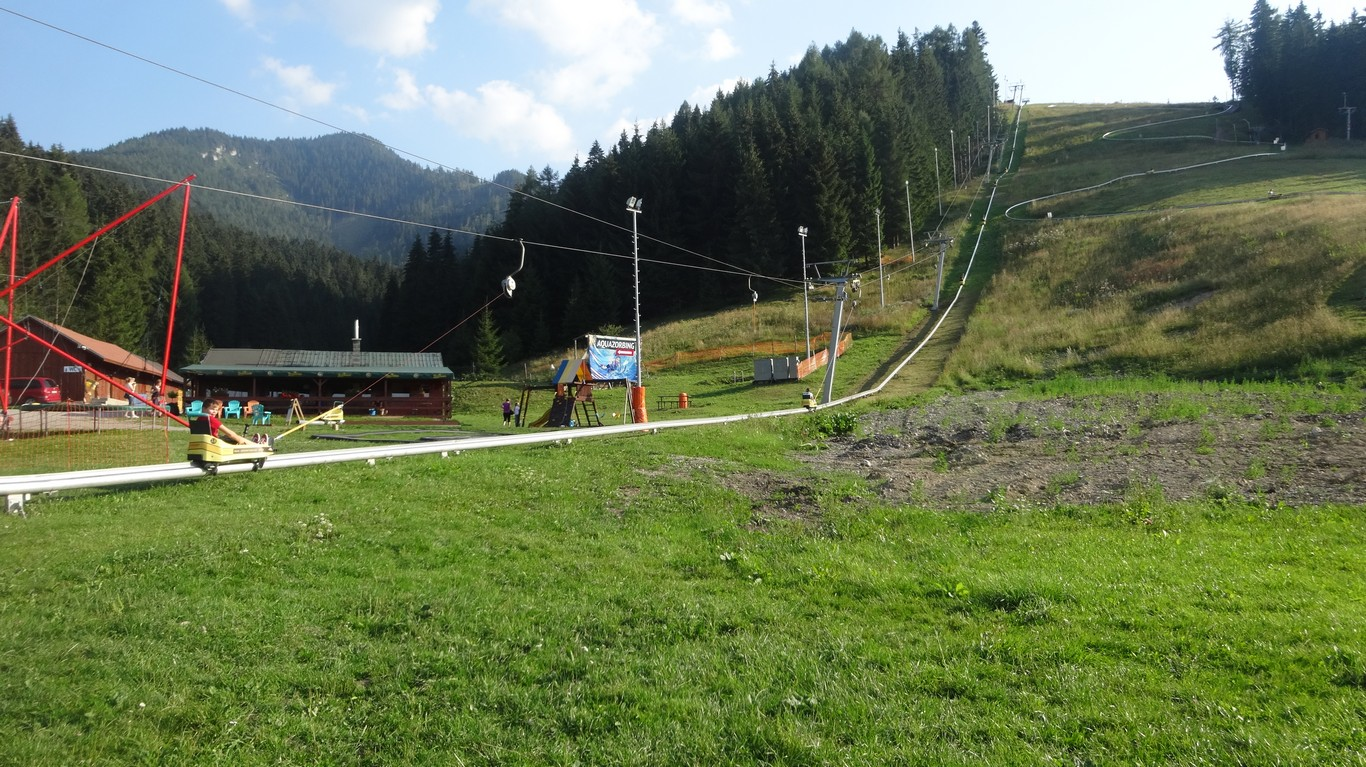
Alpine Bobsleigh track and fun park '''Žiarce'''

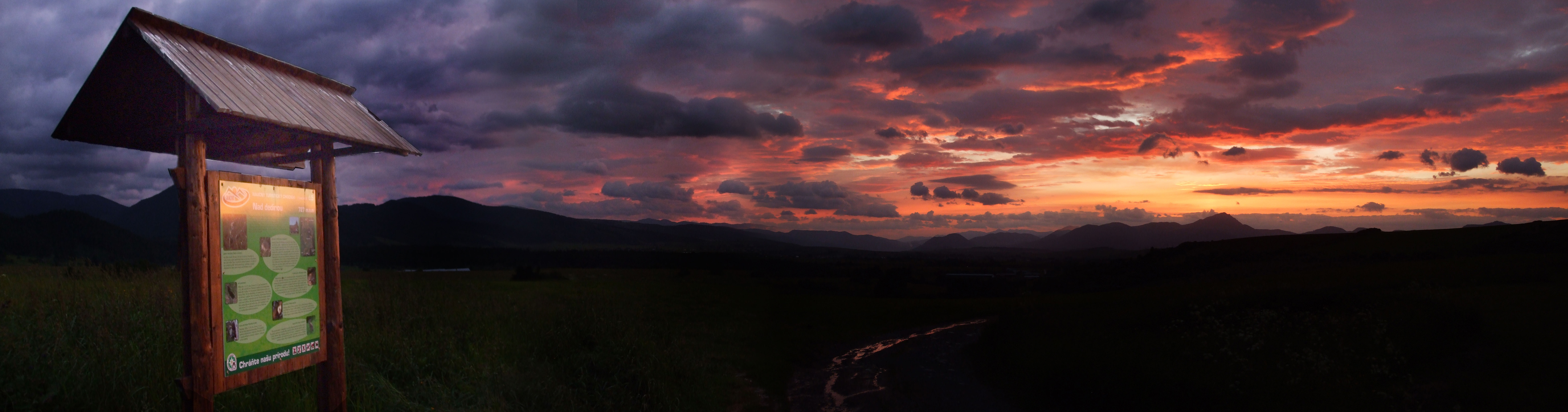
Educational trail around Pavčina Lehota

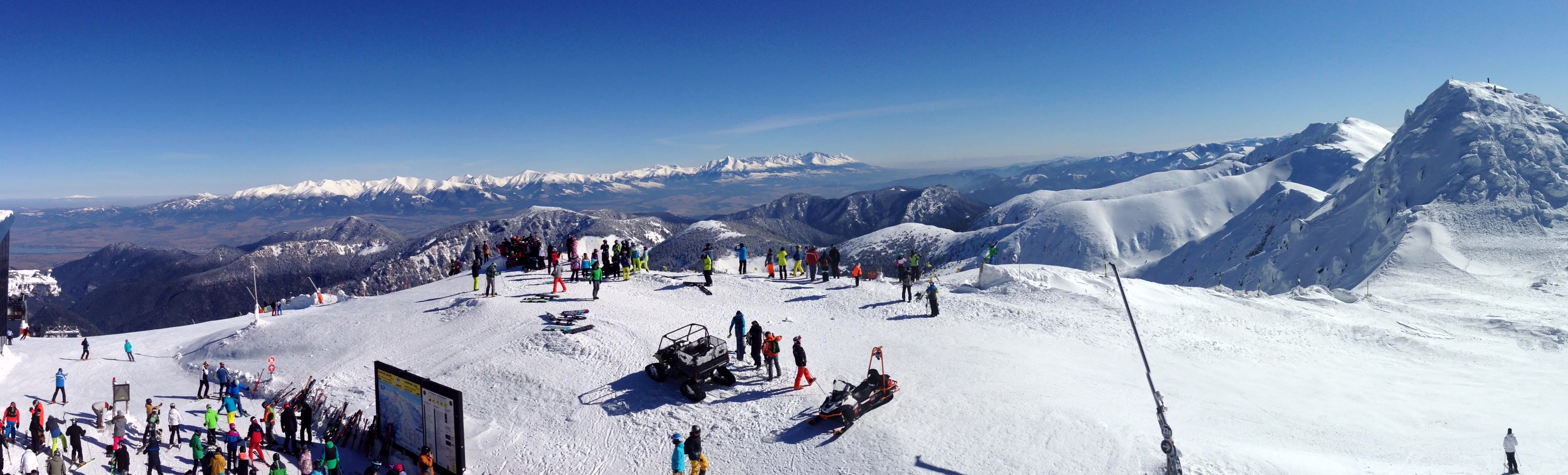
Skiing in Low Tatras in the winter

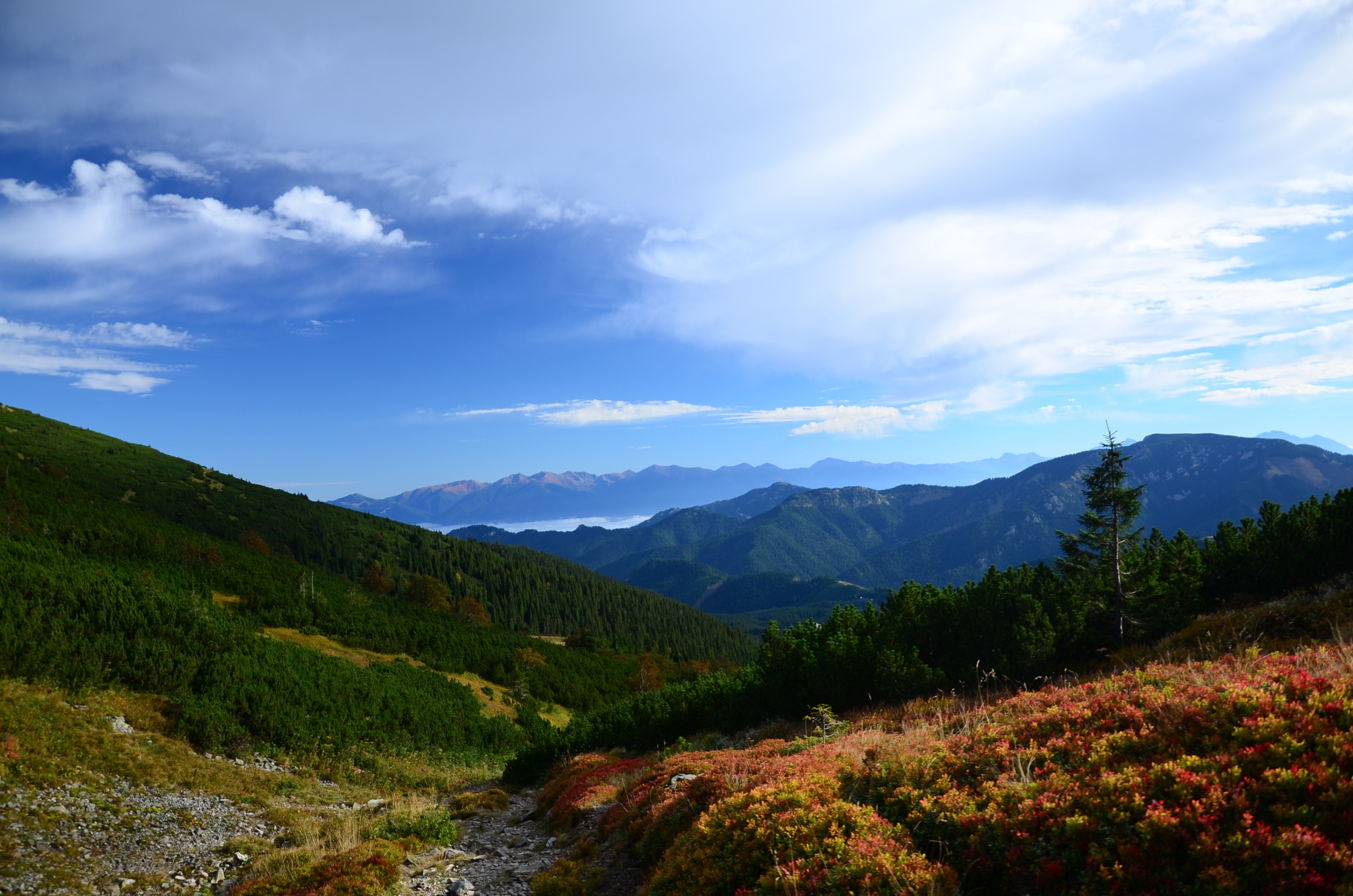
Hiking in Low Tatras in the summer

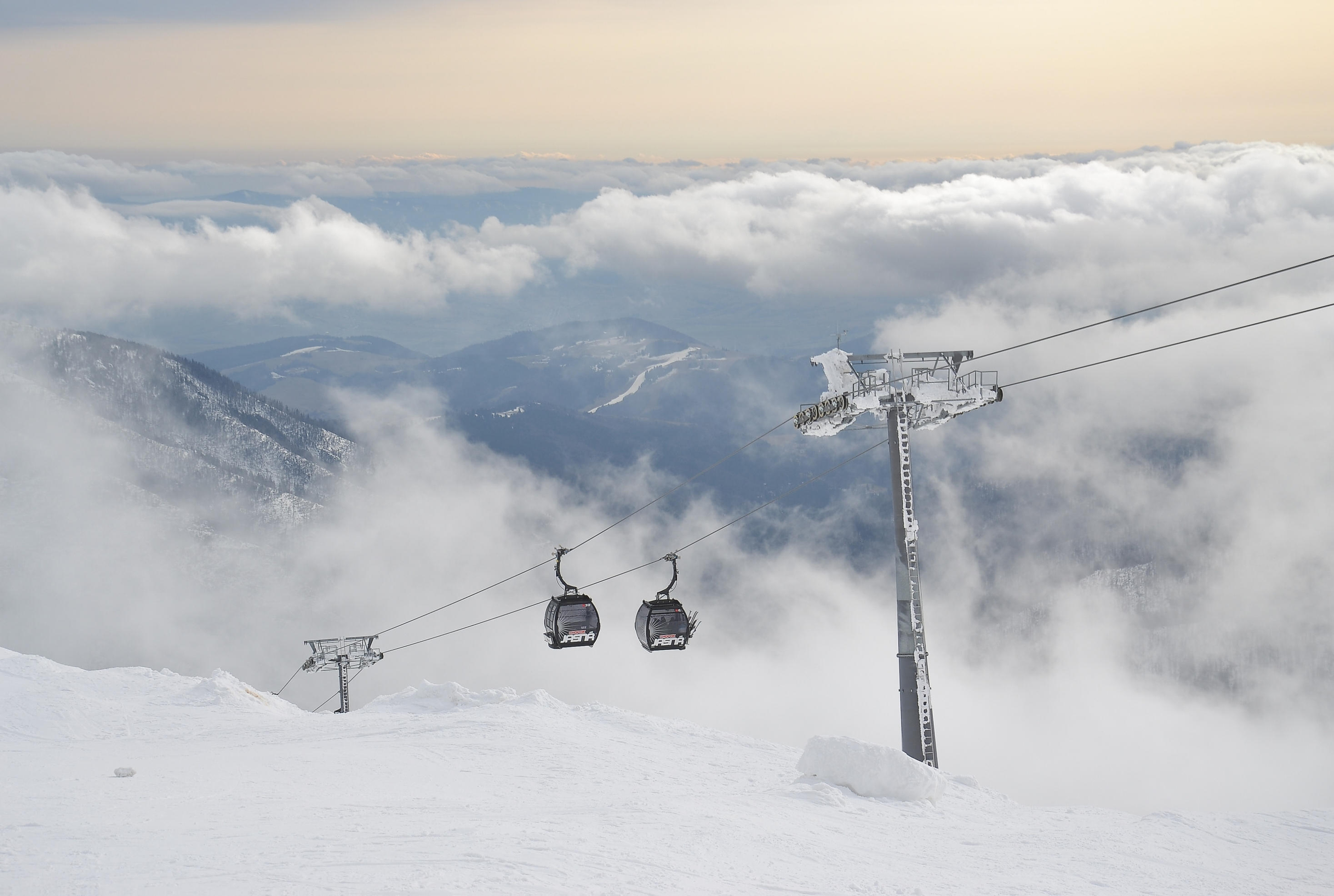
Jasná Ski Resort

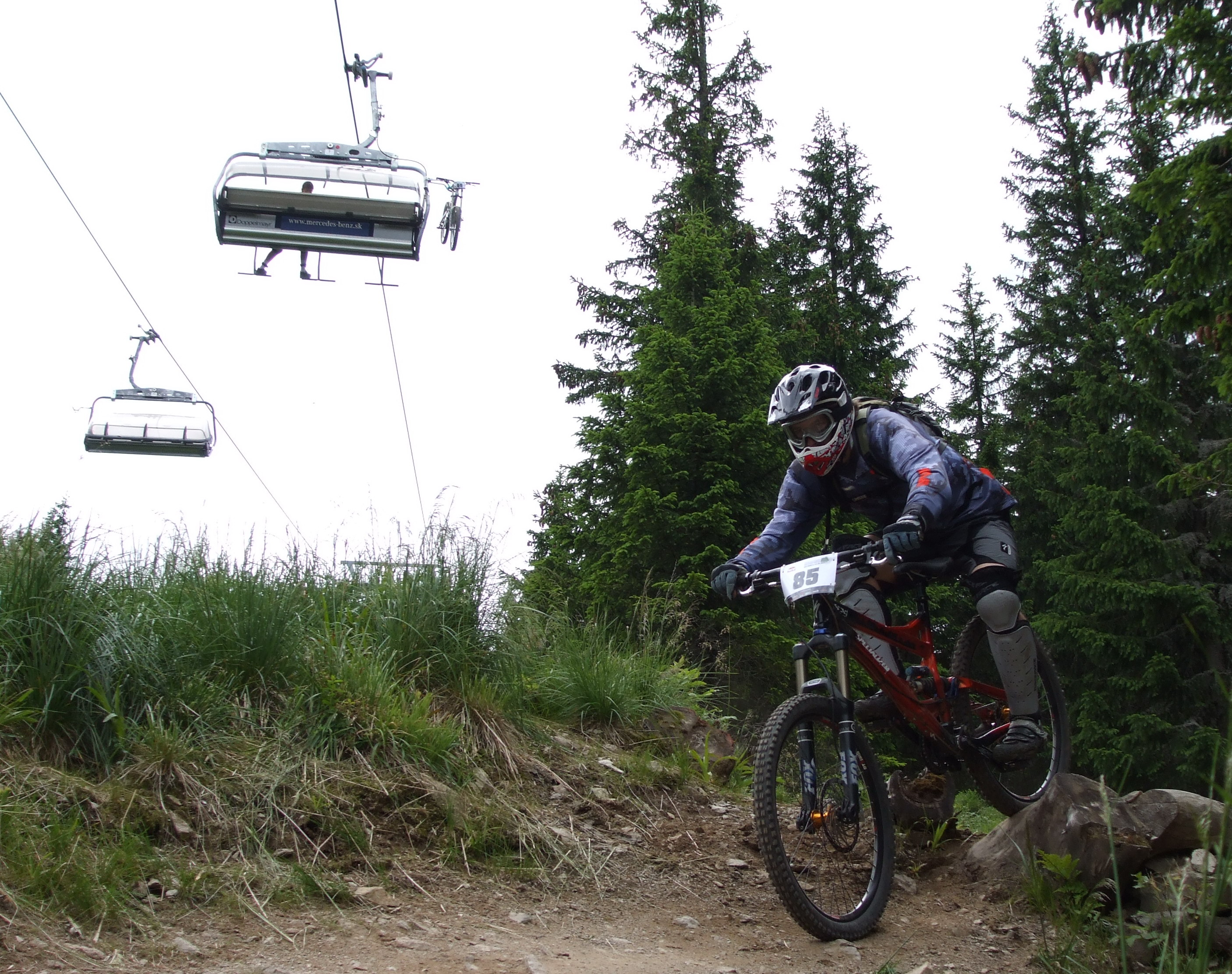
Downhill cycling - Jasná, Low Tatras

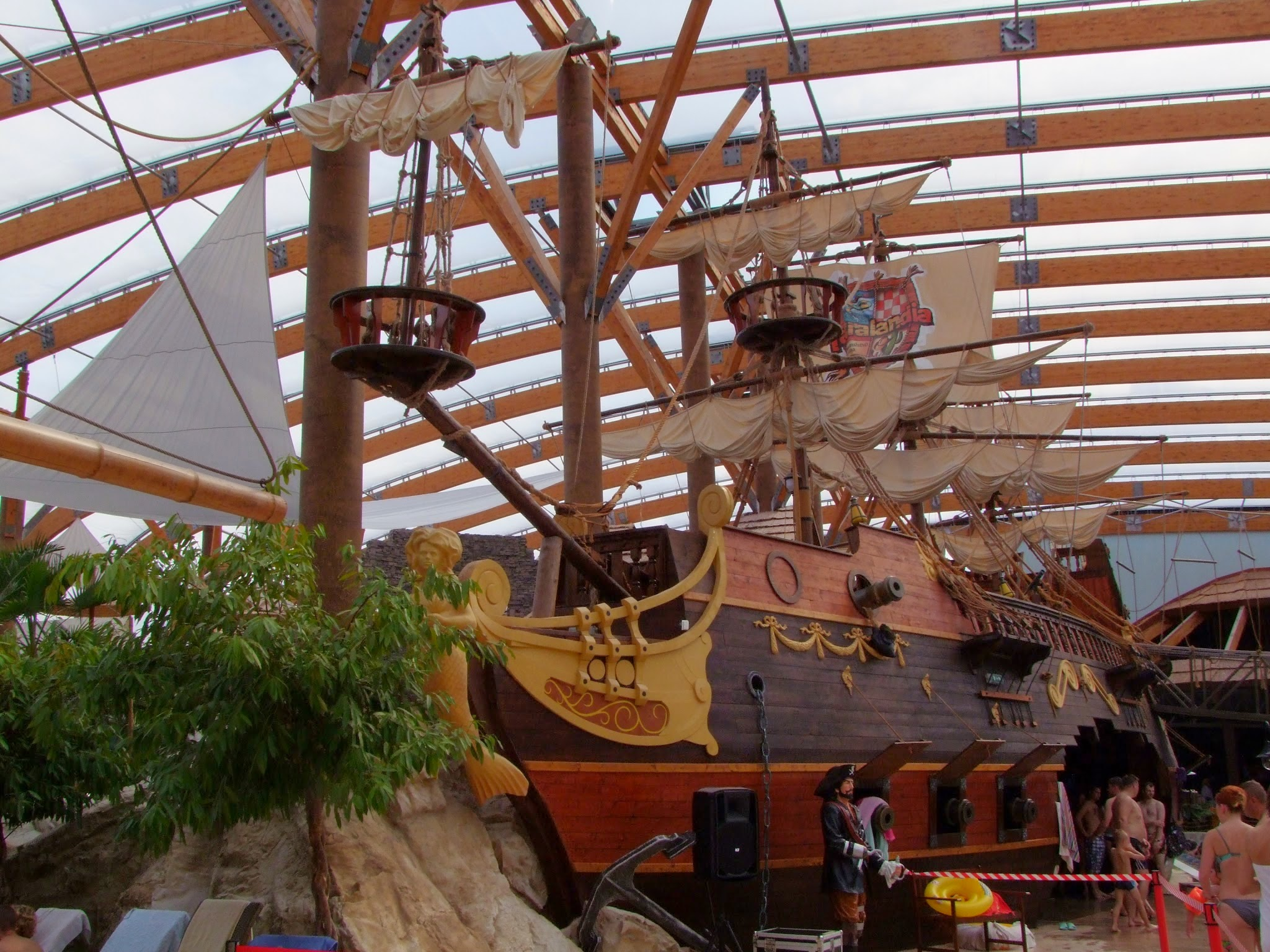
Aqua-park Tatralandia

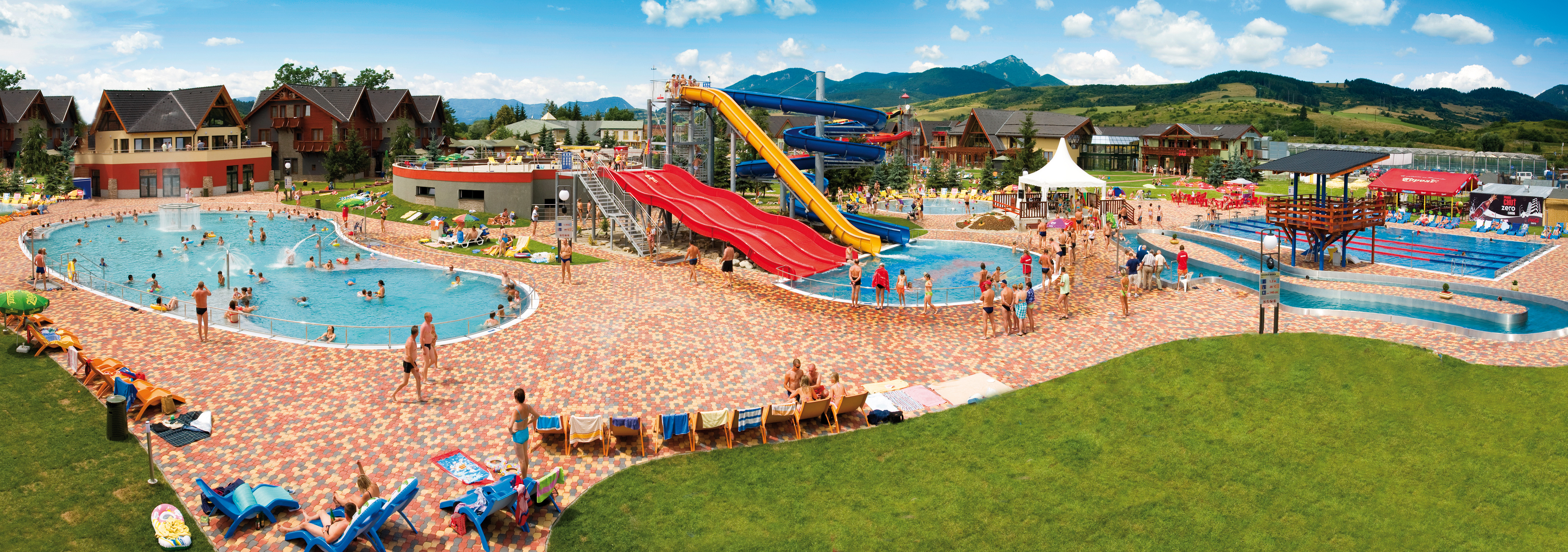
Aqua-park Bešeňová
