= Kraków bid for the 2022 Winter Olympics =

Withdrawn bid by the Polish Olympic Committee

Bids for the 2022 Winter Olympics and Paralympics
Overview
- XXIV Olympic Winter Games; XIII Paralympic Winter Games

Details
- City: Kraków, Poland
- Chair: Magdalena Sroka
- NOC: Polish Olympic Committee (POL)

Previous Games hosted
- None

Kraków 2022 was a bid by the Polish Olympic Committee to hold the 2022 Winter Olympics in Kraków. On 25 May 2014, the inhabitants of Kraków voted to withdraw the bid in a binding referendum. After that Kraków discontinued the application on 26 May 2014.

== History ==
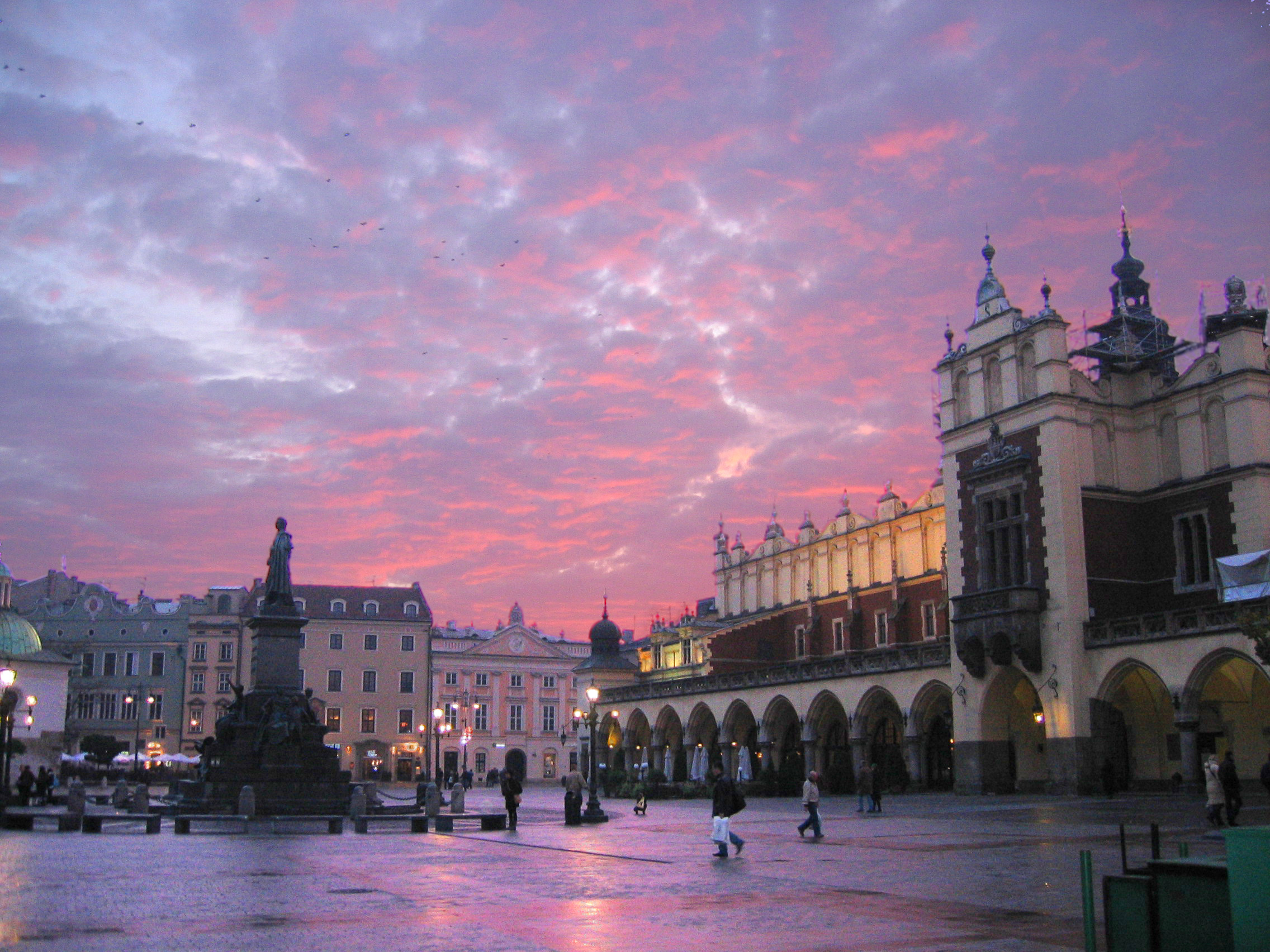
Main Square, Kraków

On 6 March 2010, during a sports facility opening ceremony, Polish President Lech Kaczyński announced that he would like his country to be a candidate for 2022 Winter Olympic Games. A month later, on 10 April 2010, he died in a tragic plane crash, which killed 96 people including him, his wife, and the President of the Polish Olympic Committee. Although most snow sport events can be held in Zakopane, some alpine ski events would have to be held in Slovakia, where higher slopes can be found.

On 19 and 20 October 2012, Polish and Slovak NOCs with Kraków city administration had a meeting in which they agreed to submit the bid possibly in 2013 and formed an official alliance. The idea has had an initial acceptance by the Polish government. On 10 May 2013 the Sejm of the Republic of Poland in a vote gave support to the possible bid. On 29 March 2014 Elżbieta Bieńkowska, Poland's Deputy Prime Minister and Minister for Infrastructure and Development, said that the central government would only finance those Games-related infrastructure projects that are planned anyway, independently of the Games. The remaining costs, including sport facilities and the Olympic village, would need to be financed by local authorities.

Kraków confirmed their joint bid with Jasná, Slovakia to host the 2022 Winter Olympics on November 7, 2013.

Initial opinion polls commissioned by Kraków city authorities returned results in favour of holding the Games. A majority of 68% of participants in a public opinion poll held in June 2013 among Kraków's residents supported the bid, with 25% being against. However, the poll was held before any information on planned spending was made publicly available and before any objections were raised in wider public debate. Opinion polls conducted between 28 October and 2 November 2013 with a sample size of 2,000 respondents throughout Poland resulted in 81% responses in favour across Poland, 79% in Małopolska and 66% in Kraków.

Later opinion polls put public support for holding the Games under doubt. A poll realised by Homo Homini polling center among respondents throughout Poland on 31 March 2014 has indicated that 52% of respondents oppose the Games, 32% are in favour and 16% have no opinion. Another nationwide opinion poll realised for the Polish Radio on 28 April 2014 confirmed that the majority of Poles oppose the Games, with 58,4% against and 32% in favour of holding the Olympic Games in Kraków. A citywide poll in Kraków realised by LoveKraków.pl news website gave 36,3% answers supporting the Games with 63,7% being against. In difference to previous polls from 2013, polls from 2014 were commissioned by news agencies without any interest in holding the Games, not by Kraków local authorities or the bid committee which both have a clear pro-Games agenda. They were ultimately confirmed by the vote in a local referendum on 25 May 2014.

In late 2013 and early 2014 opposition against Kraków's bid for Olympic Games has gathered momentum. As of 30 March 2014, "Kraków Przeciwko Igrzyskom" ("Kraków Against Games") initiative has won support of over 17,300 Facebook users and gathered over 7900 signatures under an online petition calling for referendum over the bid. Main concerns raised by the critics are expected exorbitant costs, likely cost overruns and the resulting rise in Kraków's debt, as well as the need to build sport facilities of little use beyond the games, in contrast to limited interest of Kraków city authorities in spending public money to improve the quality of life of the population. It has been brought to attention in the national press that the overall economic benefits of holding Olympic games are doubtful, local and national public authorities are almost always laden with excessive debt in result, while the only parties actually benefitting from the Games seem to be the International Olympic Committee and national committees. Criticism voiced by opponents of the Games was partly confirmed already when the Games application has been lodged in mid-March 2014. In difference to previous estimates, the Games application does not include several previously planned transport infrastructure projects, while spending on sport facilities is to be significantly higher than previously planned.

Even though the bid was still in early stages, in February 2014 the bid committee has already drawn much criticism in the national press for employing staff (financed from public money) according to unclear criteria, questionable spending on promotional activities including TV spots and a visit by city officials to the Sochi Olympic Games, as well as awarding the contract for preparation of the Games application to a company involved in the 2010 Commonwealth Games corruption scandal. All the cited allegations were later responded by the bid committee.

Kraków's Games application has been lodged on 22 March 2014. Its contents were leaked to the press and published on the internet. The application was criticised for misinforming the International Olympic Committee on climatic and environmental conditions, in particular for failing to provide true information on catastrophic air pollution in both Kraków and Zakopane.

Further controversies arise from the planned location of the Kraków Olympic Park, in particular of the Olympic Village. Its construction would require converting a significant part of the Park Lotników and adjacent green areas into a build-up area with high-rise construction. The envisaged location would involve a reduction of green space despite its crucial importance for Kraków in view of its appalling air pollution record (third most polluted city in the EU).

On 9 April 2014 it was disclosed that Andrzej Walczak, husband of the chairperson of the bid committee Jagna Marczułajtis-Walczak (although himself with no official position in the bid committee), had negotiated to pay journalists for positive coverage of the Games bid. Following widespread reporting of the scandal in the press, Jagna Marczułajtis-Walczak resigned from the bid committee on 12 April.

=== Local referendum and withdrawal ===
Kraków city council had initially rejected the proposal to submit Kraków's bid to a referendum, in a marked difference to Munich, Graubünden and Oslo; however, following increasing opposition, on 24 March 2014, Kraków mayor Jacek Majchrowski promised that the bid would be submitted to a referendum. The vote, held on 25 May 2014 and coinciding with the European Parliament election, covered four issues: Kraków's Olympic bid, plans to build a metro system, increased monitoring by CCTV cameras and increased spending on bicycle paths. According to Polish law, the result of a local referendum is binding if 30% of eligible voters cast their votes; this criterion was met, as the participation rate was 35.96%. Kraków's bid for the 2022 Winter Olympics was rejected by a majority of 69.72% of the voters.

On 26 May 2014, Majchrowski explained that in view of the negative result of the referendum, Kraków would withdraw its bid for the Winter Olympics.

== Previous and future events ==
=== Big events in Kraków ===
In 2000 Kraków were chosen by the European Union as the European Capital of Culture. In 2012, during UEFA European Championship none of the events were held in Kraków, although English, Dutch and Italian teams chose the city as their base-camp. Kraków Arena will be one of the venues hosting the 2014 FIVB Volleyball Men's World Championship tournament. Kraków also bid to host events of 2015 European Capital of Sport (lost to Turin). In 2016 World Youth Day will be organized, with approximately 1 million expected attendance. In the same year 2016 European Men's Handball Championship will be co-organised in Kraków.

=== Winter sport events in Zakopane ===
Zakopane hosted Winter Universiade twice: in 1993 and 2001. Regularly FIS Ski Jumping World Cup is organised at the Great Rafter. In 2000 Biathlon European Championships were hosted here as well. In 1929, 1939 and 1962 FIS Nordic World Ski Championships were held in the Zakopane and Tatra Mountains area.

=== Significant sport events in Poland ===
In 1997 Warsaw hosted World Single Distance Speed Skating Championships and in 2007 European Figure Skating Championships. In 2008 Warsaw were chosen by the European Union as the European Capital of Sport. Upper Silesia organised 2009 European Youth Olympic Winter Festival. Poznań hosted 2011 Women's Indoor Hockey World Cup and 2011 Men's Indoor Hockey World Cup. In 2012 Poland co-host UEFA Euro 2012. Sopot will be host 2014 IAAF World Indoor Championships. Poland will host too the 2014 FIVB Volleyball Men's World Championship. The 2017 World Games were held in Wrocław.

== Previous bids ==
=== Previous bids from other Polish cities ===
Zakopane bid to host the 2006 Winter Olympics but failed to become a candidate. Turin was ultimately awarded the games.

Poznań bid to host the 2010 Summer Youth Olympics, but failed to become a candidate. Singapore was ultimately awarded the games. Poznan went on to bid for the 2014 Summer Youth Olympics but lost to Nanjing. Poznan then went on to bid for the 2018 Summer Youth Olympics, but withdrew the bid. Buenos Aires was ultimately awarded the games.

=== Previous bids by other Slovak cities ===
Poprad bid to host the 2002 and 2006 Winter Olympics but failed to become a candidate. Salt Lake City and Turin were awarded the 2002 and 2006 games respectively.

== Venues ==
The proposed venues plan comprises:

Venue areas

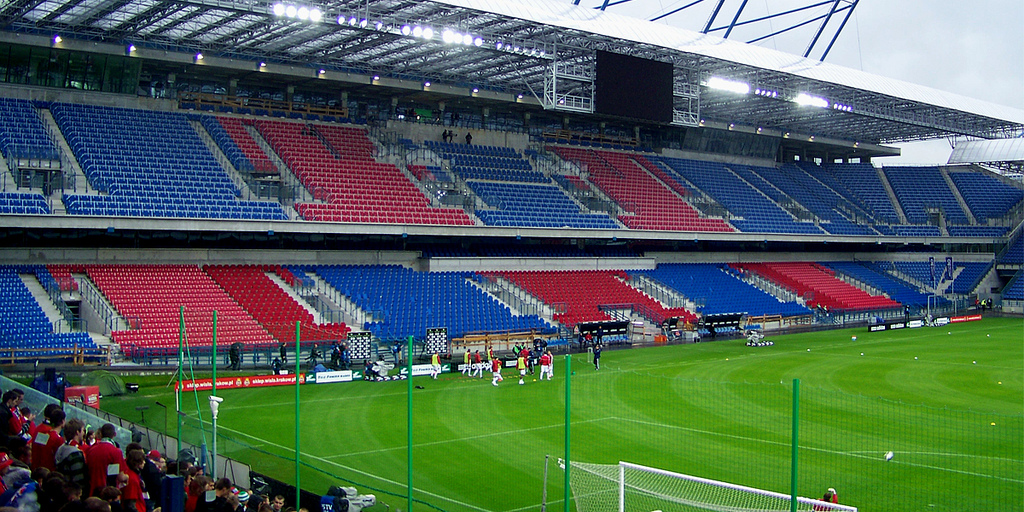
Wisła Stadium

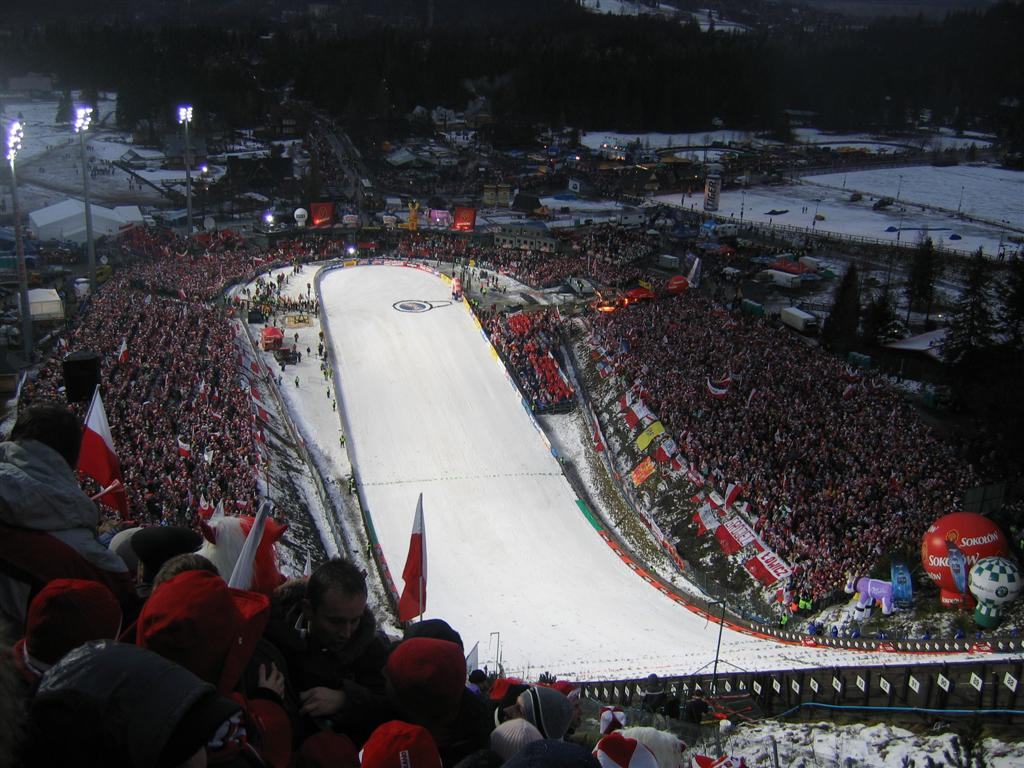
Wielka Krokiew planned for ski jumping and Nordic combined

=== Kraków Olympic Park Cluster ===
- Olympic Village
- ICE Kraków – IOC sessions, Cultural Center
- Kraków EXPO – Main Press Center, International Broadcasting Center
- Kraków Arena – figure skating, short track
- Sports University Arena – speed skating

=== Kraków Wisła Cluster ===
- Wisła Stadium – opening and closing ceremony
- Wisła Arena – second Ice Hockey venue
- Cracovia Stadium – Ice Hockey venue
- Kolna Arena – curling
- Myślenice Sliding Centre – Bobsleigh, Luge and Skeleton competitions

=== Zakopane Cluster ===
- Olympic Village – Zakopane
- Zakopane Media Center
- Krokiew Complex - Ski Jumping
- Zakopane Nordic Centre
- Kościelisko Biathlon Stadium
- The Hawrań Ski Centre - Freestyle Skiing and Snowboard
- Chopok-Jasná – alpine skiing

== Bid logo ==
The bid logo is inspired from the Polish decorative pattern called parzenica. The yellow square at the center refers to the shape of the Kraków´s old town market square.

== Transport ==
The main airport would be the John Paul II International Airport Kraków–Balice located about 17 km from the Main Olympic Village. Direct trains used to cover the route between Kraków Główny train station and the airport in 15 minutes but the connection was suspended in early 2014, because the rail track and stations are being renovated and upgraded. 3,647,616 people used the airport in 2013, giving Kraków Airport 15 percent of all air passenger traffic in Poland. Currently, the airport offers 59 connections and is operated by 2 terminals (international T1 and national T2). The Katowice International Airport is located about 75 minutes from Kraków. The Poprad-Tatry Airport is located 60 kilometres (37 mi) from Jasná.

Kraków has no suburban rail system, but there are plans to develop such a system.

Kraków is located on the A4 East-West highway. The road distance from Kraków to Jasná is 175 kilometres (109 mi), at least 2 hours 50 minutes by road in good traffic conditions. The road distance from Kraków to Zakopane is 110 kilometres (68 mi), 1½ hours by road in good traffic conditions. The Kraków-Zakopane road is notorious for traffic jams in high tourist season and during major sporting events. By 2022 the first 60 kilometres (37 mi) will probably be expressway (S7).
