= Poprad-Tatry bid for the 2006 Winter Olympics =

Bids for the 2006 Winter Olympics and Paralympics
Overview
- XX Olympic Winter Games; IX Paralympic Winter Games
- Winner: Turin; Runner-up: Sion; Shortlist: Helsinki · Klagenfurt · Poprad-Tatry · Zakopane

Details
- City: Poprad, Slovakia
- NOC: Slovak Olympic Committee (SVK)

Previous Games hosted
- None (bid for 2002 Winter Olympics)

Decision
- Result: Not shortlisted

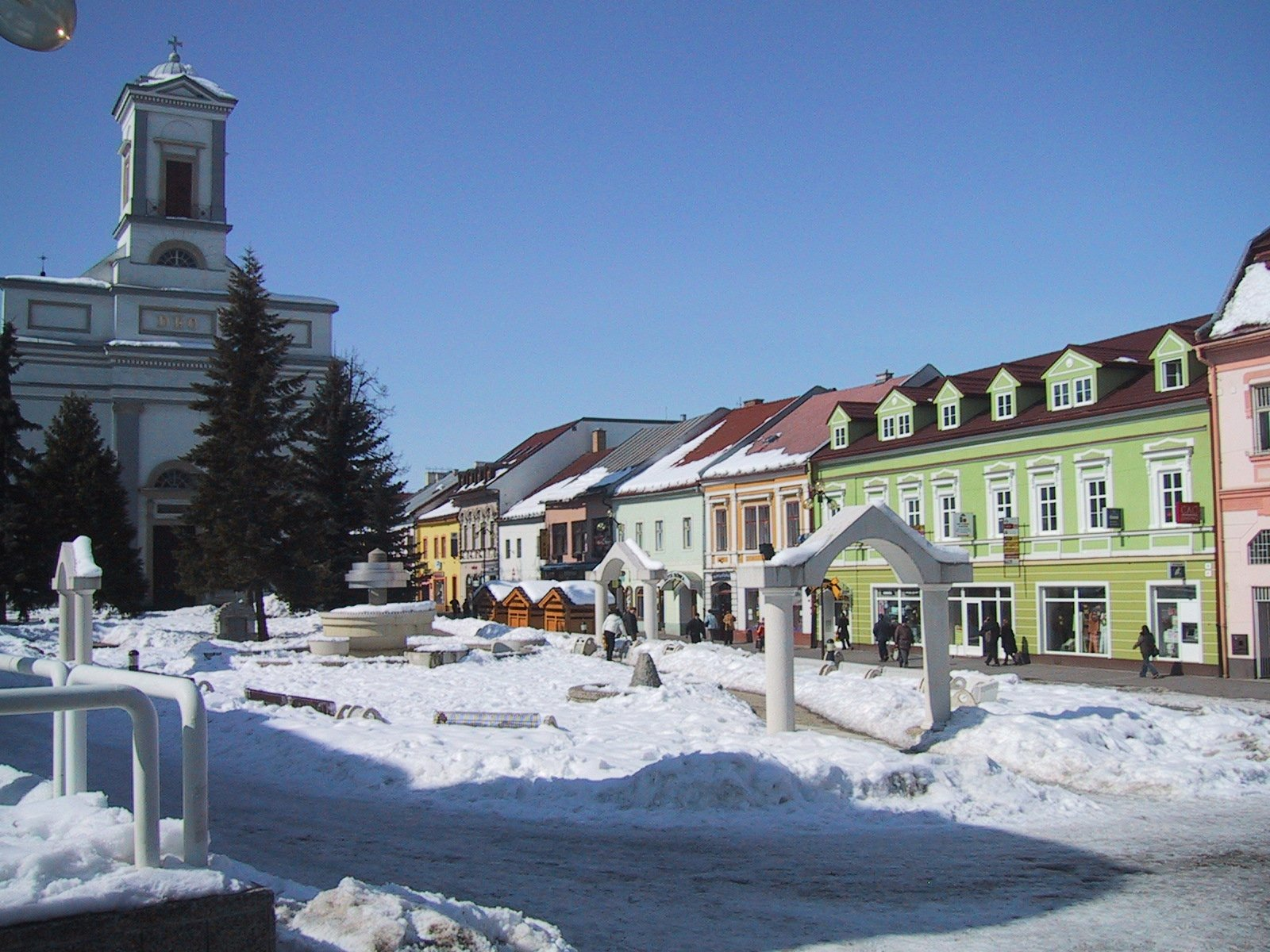
Poprad Center Square planned for medal ceremonies

Poprad-Tatry 2006 (Hungarian: Poprád 2006; German: Deutschendorf 2006) was an unsuccessful bid by Poprad, Slovakia and the Slovak Olympic Committee to host the 2006 Winter Olympics. It was one of six candidates, but failed to be short-listed.

== Venues ==
The proposed venues were:

=== Poprad Cluster ===
- Poprad - ceremonies, olympic village, men's ice hockey, figure skating, short track, speed skating
- Kežmarok - women's ice hockey
- Štrbské Pleso - ski jumping, cross country skiing, Nordic combined
- Štrba - biathlon
- Svit - bobsleigh, luge and skeleton
- Lopušná Dolina - snowboard

=== Liptovský Mikuláš Cluster ===
- Liptovský Mikuláš - men's ice hockey, curling
- Jasná, Chopok - alpine skiing
- Závažná Poruba - freestyle skiing

== Evaluation ==
The proposed bid was considered as a compact sports concept in attractive surroundings, with many venues yet to be constructed. The post-Olympic use of the ice facilities was excellent as all arenas will be dedicated for ice sports development in an area already known for its passion for ice-hockey. The IOC Evaluating Committee favoured the location of all alpine events in one venue, Jasná, which had already hosted World Cup and several international competitions and was located 60 minutes from the Main Olympic Village. The experience of the Slovak Republic in providing high profile event security was rated as moderate, but the country itself hadn't experienced unusual security problems. A referendum held in the communes of the region, as well as opinion polls in 1997 and 1998 throughout Slovakia, showed a considerable majority in support of the bid. Whilst an Olympic Games marketing programme was new to Slovakia, the Bid Committee appeared to have shown diligence in evaluating the possibilities in marketing plans and opportunities.

However, the IOC evaluating report listed some problems that might have effected the Winter Games preparations. The proximity of a major road to the biathlon venue in Štrba may have been a concern for the performance of the athletes. Although Svit, where bobsleigh, luge and skeleton track was planned, is not within the National Park, there could have been environmental concerns as much deforestation was required. The Bid Committee had been unable to secure a partner willing to cover the cost of constructing the Olympic Village. Further, the Evaluation Commission considered that the operating budget of the Village appears to be on the low side and no budget could have been found for the additional accommodations. The Evaluation Commission believed also that accommodation in Poprad needed to be further developed.

While the proposed highway and railway transport concept was considered as sufficient, the Poprad-Tatry Airport could accepted only medium sized jet aircraft, and didn't have regularly scheduled flights. The Evaluation Commission believed that the costs of building infrastructure for and putting on the Olympic Games, would be a significant challenge to the financial resources of both the public and private sectors in Slovakia.

== Aftermath ==
After selection, Poprad didn't bid for Olympics, but withdrawn Kraków bid for 2022 Games included Chopok Mountain as a venue for alpine skiing events.
