= Jasná =

Village in Slovakia

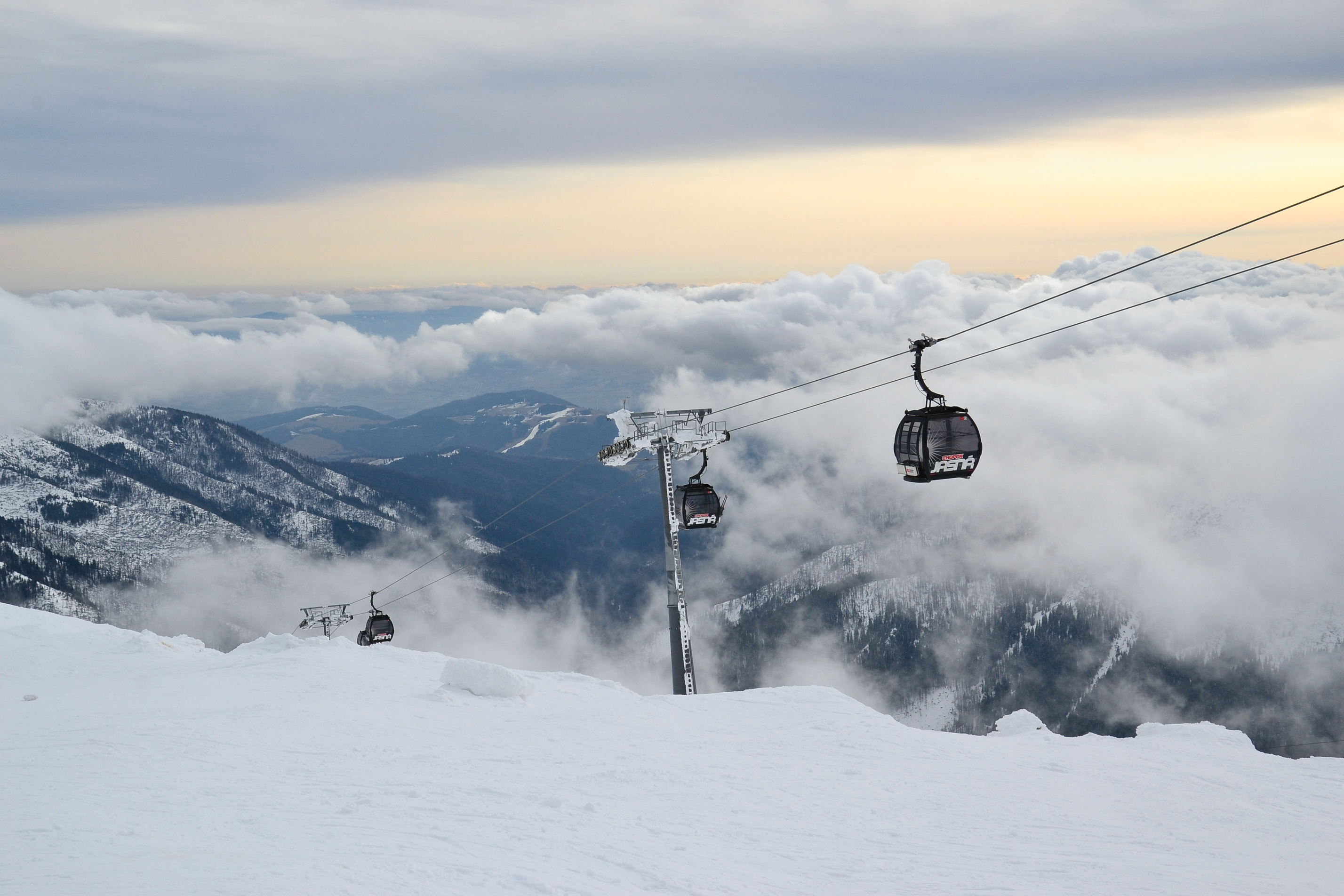
- Cable cars at Jasná in the Tatra Mountains
- Interactive map of Jasná
- Location: Jasná, Demänovská Dolina, Slovakia
- Nearest city: Liptovský Mikuláš; 12 km (7 mi)
- Coordinates: 48°58′18″N 19°35′5″E
- Vertical: 1,081 m (3,547 ft)
- Top elevation: 2,024 m (6,640 ft)
- Base elevation: 943 m (3,094 ft)
- Trails: 50 km (31 mi): 25km beginner; 18km intermediate; 7km advanced
- Lift system: 23 total 3 Gondola; 1 Funitel; 1 Funicular; 8 chair 5 surface lift 5 Magic carpet
- Lift capacity: 28,439 / hr
- Terrain parks: 1
- Snowmaking: over 36 km (22 mi)
- Night skiing: limited
- Website: jasna.sk

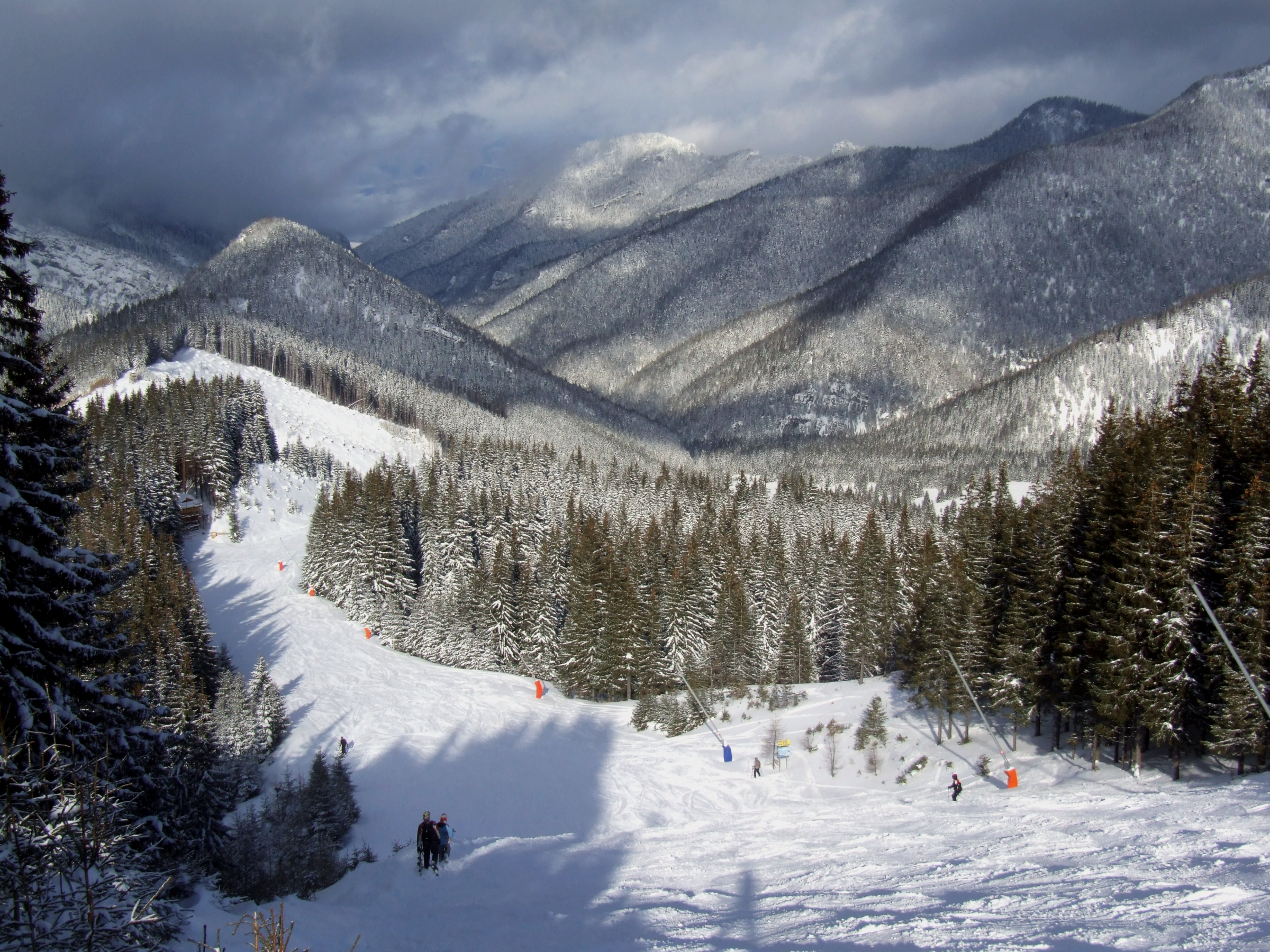
Jasná ski resort

Jasná is a small village situated in central Slovakia, in the Low Tatras mountains. It is a part of the municipality Demänovská Dolina.

== Skiing venue ==
The Jasná area resorts have a total of more than 30 lifts on all sides of the Chopok Mountain. The resort Jasná Low Tatras, is said to be the largest ski area in Slovakia, with eight chair lifts and four cable cars. It has 49 km (30 mi) of piste, back bowl, a 6 km (3.7 mi) home-run, a brand new revamped terrain park, a great deal of off-piste (12 freeride zones), night skiing, and many tree runs. Jasná-Chopok is also a large resort with 41 trails covering 49 skiable kilometers of trails.

The slopes are graded as 28% beginner, 51% intermediate, and 21% advanced. Many mountain activities are available in the valley and nearby area.

== Topography ==
The mountain has a summit of 2,024 m (6,640 ft) and a base at 943 m (3,094 ft) above sea level at Lúčky, the vertical drop is 1,081 m (3,547 ft).

== Nearby areas ==
Nearby are entrances to the Demänovská Cave of Liberty (Demänovská jaskyňa Slobody) and Demänovská Ice Cave (Demänovská ľadová jaskyňa).

Liptovský Mikuláš is the tourist town at the base of Jasná which serves the mountain. There are many hotels and restaurants, including a UK-owned guesthouse with full equipment hire and suggestions for the region.

Liptovský Mikuláš has a direct train connection to Bratislava or by air through Poprad airport.

== 2022 Winter Olympic bid ==
Being about 153 kilometres (95 miles) from Kraków, and having the right climate for world-class skiing, Jasná/Chopok joined in Kraków's bid to host the 2022 Winter Olympics as the alpine skiing venue. If chosen, it would have been the first time that an Olympic Games would be held in multiple countries at the same time. However, in May 2014 Kraków abandoned their bid after it was rejected by the general population in a referendum.
