= Sion bid for the 2006 Winter Olympics =

Bids for the 2006 Winter Olympics and Paralympics
Overview
- XX Olympic Winter Games; IX Paralympic Winter Games
- Winner: Turin; Runner-up: Sion; Shortlist: Helsinki · Klagenfurt · Poprad-Tatry · Zakopane

Details
- City: Sion, Switzerland
- NOC: Swiss Olympic Association (SUI)

Previous Games hosted
- None bid for 1976 Winter Olympics and 2002 Winter Olympics

Decision
- Result: Runner-up (2nd place)

Sion submitted its bid for the 2006 Winter Olympics backed up by the Swiss Olympic Association. The sports concept was considered as "well thought out with the Olympic Village centrally located in Sion, the ice sports in the Rhône valley and the skiing events in the mountains on either side of the city".

== Venues ==
The proposed venues were:

=== Sion Cluster ===
- Sion - ceremonies, main olympic village, figure skating, short track
- Martigny - ice hockey, speed skating (temporary)
- Visp - ice hockey
- Crans-Montana- alpine skiing, snowboard, ski jumping, curling, Nordic combined
- Veysonnaz - alpine skiing, freestyle skiing
- Goms Valley - biathlon, cross-country skiing, Nordic combined

=== St. Moritz Venue ===
- St. Moritz - St. Moritz-Celerina Olympic Bobrun for bobsleigh, luge, and skeleton
