= Helsinki bid for the 2006 Winter Olympics =

Bids for the 2006 Winter Olympics and Paralympics
Overview
- XX Olympic Winter Games; IX Paralympic Winter Games
- Winner: Turin; Runner-up: Sion; Shortlist: Helsinki · Klagenfurt · Poprad-Tatry · Zakopane

Details
- City: Helsinki, Finland
- NOC: Finnish Olympic Committee (FIN)

Previous Games hosted
- 1952 Summer Olympics

Decision
- Result: Not shortlisted

Helsinki 2006 (Swedish: Helsingfors 2006) was a joint bid for the 2006 Winter Olympics presented by the city of Helsinki and Finnish Olympic Committee. Some of the proposed venues were located in Lillehammer, Norway.

Finland does not possess sufficiently high mountains in its territory to host the alpine skiing competitions and thus proposed some events pursuant to Rule 38.2 of the Olympic Charter. Whilst the individual venues were considered to be excellent, the 1000-km distance between Helsinki and Lillehammer, and the fact that a large portion of the Games will be held in Norway, may have led to organisational and operational burdens.

== Venues ==
The proposed venues were spread between two countries:

=== Finland ===
- Helsinki - ceremonies, main olympic village, ice hockey (two venues: Hartwall Arena and Barona Areena), speed skating (Myllypuro), figure skating and short track (Helsinki Ice Hall), curling (Pirkkola Arena)
- Espoo - ice hockey (Barona Areena)
- Lahti - biathlon, ski-jumping, Nordic combined, cross-country skiing, freestyle skiing (Messilä)

=== Norway ===
- Lillehammer - Lillehammer Olympic Bobsleigh and Luge Track for bobsleigh, luge and skeleton
- Hafjell - alpine skiing (men's and women's slalom, giant slalom and combined slalom), snowboard
- Kvitfjell - alpine skiing (men's and women's downhill, combined downhill and super-G)
