= Klagenfurt bid for the 2006 Winter Olympics =

Unsuccessful bid for the 2006 Winter Olympics

Bids for the 2006 Winter Olympics and Paralympics
Overview
- XX Olympic Winter Games; IX Paralympic Winter Games
- Winner: Turin; Runner-up: Sion; Shortlist: Helsinki · Klagenfurt · Poprad-Tatry · Zakopane

Details
- City: Klagenfurt, Austria
- NOC: Austrian Olympic Committee (AUT)

Previous Games hosted
- None

Decision
- Result: Not shortlisted

Klagenfurt 2006 (Austro-Bavarian: Klognfuat 2006; Slovene: Celovec 2006) was an unsuccessful multinational bid submitted by Klagenfurt, Austria and the Austrian Olympic Committee to host the 2006 Winter Olympics. It was one of six candidates, but failed to be short-listed. The 2006 Winter Olympics were awarded to Turin.

The failed bid proposed by Tarvisio for the 2002 Winter Olympics planned to use venues placed in Italy and Slovenia. One of the principal motivations was to "demonstrate the unity, harmony, and friendship of a region which has existed and developed as such over centuries, despite changing conditions, separation by political borders and language barriers". The cross-border structure was central to the bid's identity, but it also made the proposal dependent on coordination among authorities and venues in three countries.

== Background ==
The Klagenfurt bid developed from the cross-border Senza Confini concept, which proposed using winter-sport venues in the neighbouring regions of Carinthia, Friuli-Venezia Giulia and Slovenia. In 1997, while several Austrian regions were seeking national support for a 2006 Winter Olympic bid, Klagenfurt promoted the project as a way to stage competitions across the three border regions. The official bid material was titled Imagine: The bid beyond borders and presented the candidacy as a joint project involving Austria, Italy and Slovenia.

In October 1997, Carinthia held a public consultation on whether the region should pursue the bid with Friuli-Venezia Giulia and Slovenia. About 415,000 Carinthians were eligible to participate in the vote. Friuli-Venezia Giulia later adopted regional legislation concerning financial guarantees connected to the possible staging of the 2006 Winter Olympics.

== Bid process ==
The bid was considered under the revised IOC procedure used after the Salt Lake City bidding scandal. Planned visits by IOC members to candidate cities were canceled under the reform process, which affected Klagenfurt before the final presentations in Seoul. Franz Klammer, the 1976 Olympic downhill champion, led the Austrian presentation team and said the cancellation of the visit disadvantaged the bid because IOC members could not see the proposed venues.

Klagenfurt was not advanced to the final IOC vote. At the 109th IOC Session in Seoul on 19 June 1999, only Turin and Sion were submitted to the full vote, with Turin defeating Sion 53 votes to 36.

== Promotion ==
The bid committee promoted the candidacy as "Winter Games without borders". In January 1999, a promotional event at Weissensee in Carinthia brought together young athletes and Olympians from the three bid regions in support of Klagenfurt 2006.

== Legacy ==
The cross-border Olympic concept continued to be referenced after the failed bid. In 2022, the Carinthian government described a possible future Olympic candidacy involving Carinthia, Slovenia and Friuli-Venezia Giulia as a revival of the late-1990s Senza Confini bid for the 2006 Winter Olympics.

== Venues ==
The proposed venues were located in three countries:

=== Austria ===
- Klagenfurt - ceremonies, main olympic village (Valden), women's ice hockey (Klagenfurt Trade Fairs), figure skating, short track, speed skating, curling (temporary ice rink)
- Nassfeld - alpine skiing (men's downhill, the combined downhill and super-G)
- Arnoldstein - alpine skiing (women’s downhill, combined downhill and super-G)
- Hohenthurn-Achomitz - biathlon
- Bad Kleinkirchheim - snowboard

=== Italy cluster ===
- Tarvisio - alpine skiing (women’s slalom, combined slalom and giant slalom), freestyle skiing, cross-country skiing, Nordic combined
- Cortina d'Ampezzo - Eugenio Monti track for bobsleigh, luge, and skeleton

=== Slovenia cluster ===
- Ljubljana - men's ice hockey (two venues: Tivoli Hall and University Hall)
- Kranjska Gora - alpine skiing (men's slalom, combined slalom and giant slalom)
- Planica - ski-jumping, Nordic combined

== Aftermath ==
Klagenfurt 2006 was the second of four consecutive bids to host the Winter Olympics in Austria. Ganz submitted a bid to host the 2002 Winter Olympics, and Salzburg submitted bids to host the 2010 Winter Olympics and 2014 Winter Olympics.

The Italian town of Tarvisio previously bid for 2002 Winter Olympics and later became a part of the Klagenfurt 2006 bid. Cortina d'Ampezzo hosted the 2026 Winter Olympics jointly with Milan, and used the Cortina Sliding Centre, which is a full reconstruction of the Eugenio Monti Olympic Track that was a proposed venue for the Klagenfurt 2006 bid. Organizers for the 2026 Winter Olympics were encouraged by the IOC to use an existing sliding track in Innsbruck, Austria, but using venues in another country was met with protests from the Italian government.
