= Poznań bid for the 2018 Summer Youth Olympics =

Bids for the 2018 Summer Youth Olympics
Overview
- Games of the III Youth Olympiad

Details
- City: Poznań, Poland
- NOC: Polish Olympic Committee

Previous Games hosted
- none

Poznań 2018 was a bid by the city of Poznań and the Polish Olympic Committee to host the 2018 Summer Youth Olympics. Poznań withdrew their bid on October 9, 2012, for financial reasons.

== History ==
Poznań was revealed to be one of the bidding cities for the 2018 Summer Youth Olympics when the IOC announced who the applicants were on March 2, 2012.

Poznań was one of the eight cities that hosted games during the UEFA Euro 2012 championship. The Stadion Miejski hosted three matches during the championship.

Poznań, in recent years, had been a host city of such sport events as the 2011 Men's Indoor Hockey World Cup. In 2010 the city hosted the Academic Canoeing World Cup, Academic Basketball World Cup, European Male Basketball Cup and the European Athletic Cup for vets. In 2006 the city hosted the Academic Futsal World Cup and was one of the host cities for the 2006 UEFA European Under-19 Football Championship.

On October 8, 2012, the city council rejected the proposed budget for the bid. There was a lack of financial guarantees from the city organizer and the city withdrew its bid.

Buenos Aires was ultimately elected as the host city of the 2018 Summer Youth Olympic Games on July 4, 2013.

== Previous bids ==
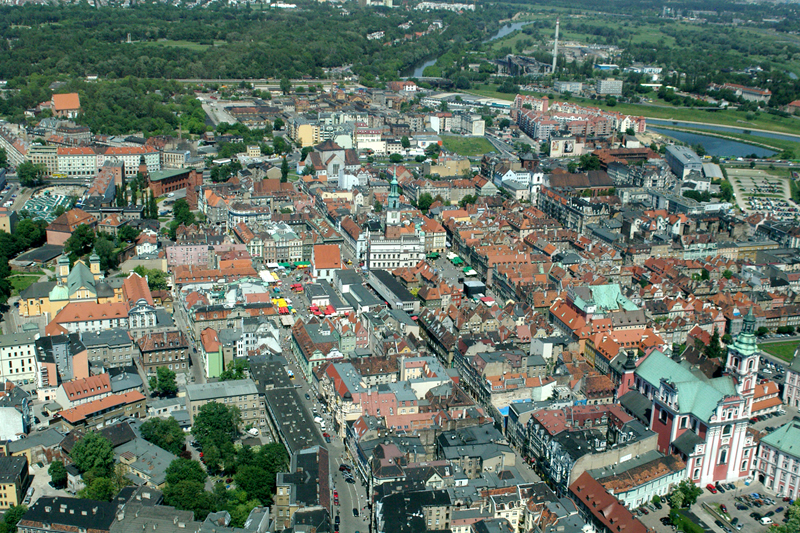
View of Poznań's Old Town

Poznań bid to host the 2014 Summer Youth Olympics but lost to Nanjing by only five votes. They bid to host the 2010 Summer Youth Olympics but failed to become a candidate. Those games were ultimately awarded to Singapore.

=== Previous bids by other Polish cities ===
Zakopane bid to host the 2006 Winter Olympics but lost to Turin.

== See also ==
- Poland at the Olympics
- Bids for the 2018 Summer Youth Olympics
