= Bids for the 2006 Winter Olympics =

Bids for the 2006 Winter Olympics and Paralympics
Overview
- XX Olympic Winter Games; IX Paralympic Winter Games
- Winner: Turin; Runner-up: Sion, Switzerland; Shortlist: Helsinki · Klagenfurt · Poprad-Tatry · Zakopane

Details
- Committee: IOC
- Election venue: Seoul; 109th IOC Session

Map of the bidding cities

Important dates
- Shortlist: June 19, 1999
- Decision: June 19, 1999

Decision
- Winner: Turin (53 votes)
- Runner-up: Sion, Switzerland (36 votes)

At the closing date of the receipt of applications to host 2006 Winter Olympics (formally known as XX Olympic Winter Games) on February 1, 1998, six cities had formally presented their candidatures to the IOC. The deadline for the receipt of candidature files was set at September 1, 1998. The Evaluation Commission proceeded with its visits to the six candidate cities in October and November 1998.

In the wake of the 2002 bidding controversy, a new bidding procedure was instituted in 1999 to elect the 2006 Winter Olympics host city. After the six candidates cities made their final presentations before the members of the International Olympic Committee, during its 108th Session in Seoul, a new body called "Selection College" was tasked with selecting two "finalist cities" that would be subjected to the members' voting, in order to determine the host city.

Turin's bid ended up defeating Sion by 53 votes to 36. The other four non-shortlisted candidate cities that made presentations to the IOC were Helsinki, Klagenfurt, Poprad-Tatry and Zakopane.

The selection of Turin over Sion came as a surprise, since Sion was the overwhelming favorite in part because the IOC is based in Switzerland.

== Final selection ==
2006 Host City Election – ballot results
City	Country (NOC)	Round 1
Turin	Italy	53
Sion	Switzerland	36
Helsinki	Finland	—
Klagenfurt	Austria	—
Poprad-Tatry	Slovakia	—
Zakopane	Poland	—

== Proposed dates (Note: Between the awarding of the bid and the Games themselves, the Games were extended from 16 to 17 days.) ==
	XX Olympic Winter Games	IX Paralympic Winter Games
Turin	4 - 19 February	9 - 18 March
Sion	11 - 26 February	12 - 26 March
Helsinki	11 - 26 February	8 - 17 March
Klagenfurt	11 - 26 February	3 - 12 March
Poprad-Tatry	4 - 19 February	4 - 13 March
Zakopane	4 - 19 February	6 - 15 March

== Bidding cities ==
City	Country	National Olympic Committee
Helsinki	Finland	Finnish Olympic Committee
Main article: Helsinki bid for the 2006 Winter Olympics
Klagenfurt	Austria	Austrian Olympic Committee
Main article: Klagenfurt bid for the 2006 Winter Olympics
Poprad	Slovakia	Slovak Olympic Committee
Main article: Poprad-Tatry bid for the 2006 Winter Olympics
Sion	Switzerland	Swiss Olympic Association
Main article: Sion bid for the 2006 Winter Olympics
Turin	Italy	Italian Olympic Committee
Main article: Turin bid for the 2006 Winter Olympics
Zakopane	Poland	Polish Olympic Committee
Main article: Zakopane bid for the 2006 Winter Olympics
