= Zakopane bid for the 2006 Winter Olympics =

Bids for the 2006 Winter Olympics and Paralympics
Overview
- XX Olympic Winter Games; IX Paralympic Winter Games
- Winner: Turin; Runner-up: Sion; Shortlist: Helsinki · Klagenfurt · Poprad-Tatry · Zakopane

Details
- City: Zakopane, Poland
- NOC: Polish Olympic Committee (POL)

Previous Games hosted
- None

Decision
- Result: Not shortlisted

Zakopane 2006 (Podhale Goral: Zokopane 2006) was an unsuccessful bid by Zakopane, Poland, and the Polish Olympic Committee to host the 2006 Winter Olympics. It was one of six candidates, but failed to be short-listed.

== Venues ==
The proposed venues concept comprised:

=== Zakopane Cluster ===
- Zakopane – main Olympic village, medal ceremonies, speed skating, men's ice hockey
- Wielka Krokiew – ceremonies, ski jumping, Nordic combined
- Kasprowy Wierch – alpine skiing (downhill, super-G, giant slalom), snowboard (giant slalom)
- Nosal – alpine skiing (slalom), freestyle skiing (moguls)
- Poronin – freestyle skiing (aerials), snowboard (halfpipe)
- Kościelisko:

- Kiry - biathlon
- Siwa Polana - cross-country skiing
- Witów - luge, bobsleigh and skeleton

=== Kraków Cluster ===
- University School of Physical Education - olympic village, men's ice hockey final, figure skating, short-track speed skating
- Cracovia Ice Hall - curling

=== Nowy Targ ===
- Municipal Ice Hall - women's ice hockey
Venues plan

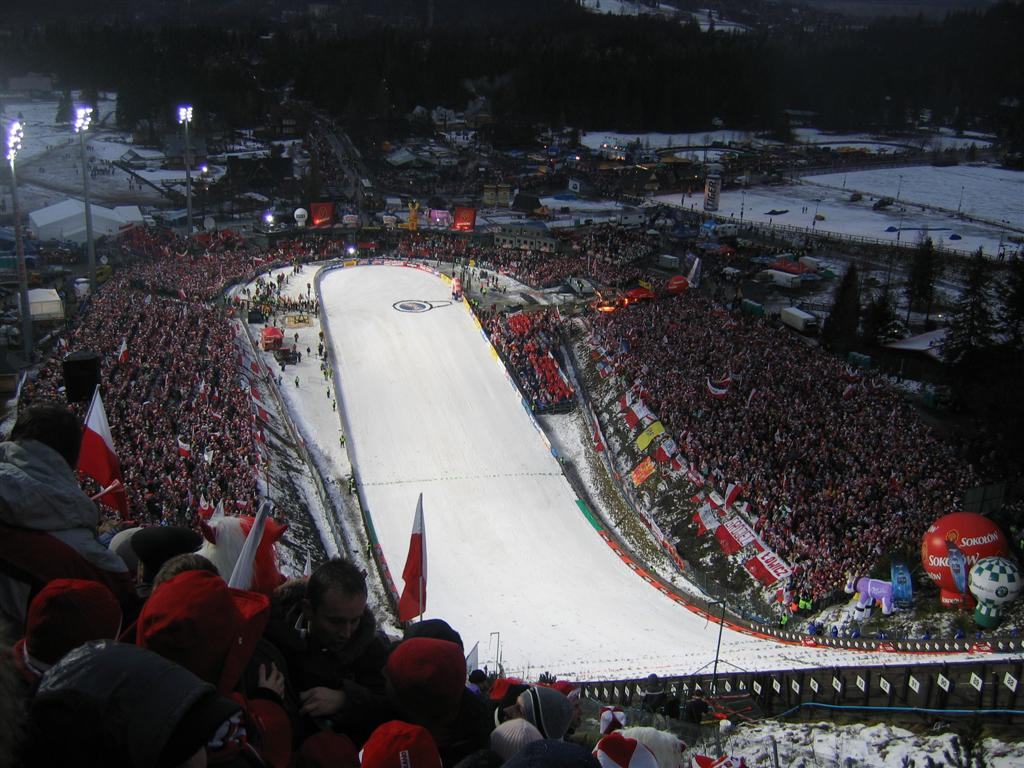
Wielka Krokiew, planned for ceremonies, ski jumping and Nordic combined

== Evaluation ==
The proposed sports concept was considered as good with most of the venues in the vicinity of Zakopane, close to the main Olympic village. The IOC evaluation report praised the support by both Polish government and the Zakopane residents (in a 1997 referendum held in Zakopane 82.6% replied positively to the question of organising the Games, and 61.6% as its financial implications). Other issues rated favorably were: sufficient experience of Poland's security forces, and winter sports traditions resulted in a good legacy and post-use of the planned venues.

However, the evaluation report listed some problems that might have occurred. The construction of certain facilities, particularly the skiing venues, to be located totally or partially in the Tatra National Park, could have been a big challenge due to its special international ecological status. The most problematic issue was using Kasprowy Wierch as a downhill, super-G, and giant slalom slope. The snowmaking facilities, cable car, lift and spectator capacities were considered insufficient and access to the stadium was non-existent. The proposed men’s downhill course was not approved by International Ski Federation. There were objections among non-governmental organisations, the scientific and intellectuals community to the proposed venues placed in the Biosphere Reserve.

Furthermore, the Evaluation Commission believed that there was a shortage in accommodation facilities and the general standard of accommodation had to be upgraded. The road between Kraków and Zakopane was rated as insufficient for Games-related traffic. The International Ice Hockey Federation was concerned with the logistics of holding the men’s ice hockey final in Kraków.

== Aftermath ==
During the 109th IOC meeting held in Seoul the final presentation was headed by Irena Szewińska. The Zakopane bid missed the shortlist.

After selection, Zakopane didn't bid for Olympics, but Kraków bid for 2022 Games included Zakopane as venue for snow sports.
