= 2014 Kraków referendum =

A referendum over four questions was held in Kraków on 25 May 2014.

== History and background ==
In 2012 the authorities of Kraków decided to launch a bid for the 2022 Winter Olympics. Although Kraków City Council had initially refused to submit the city's bid to a referendum, growing opposition to hosting the Olympics, in particular by the initiative "Kraków Przeciwko Igrzyskom" ("Krakow Against Games") has forced Kraków city mayor to change his mind and announce on 24 March 2014 that the bid would be submitted to a referendum. Three more questions were subsequently added by the Kraków City Council, which also changed the initially planned date in June to 25 May 2014, in order to coincide with the European Parliament election, thus improving chances for bigger participation.

According to Polish law, a local referendum is binding if at least 30% of eligible voters cast their votes.

== Questions ==
The referendum was held on 25 May 2014 over 4 questions:

- 1. Are you in favour of holding the 2022 Winter Olympic Games in Kraków?
- 2. Are you in favour of building metro in Kraków?
- 3. Are you in favour of creating a CCTV monitoring system in order to improve public security in Kraków?
- 4. Are you in favour of building more bicycle paths in Kraków?

== Results ==
Voter turnout was 35.96%, with the result that the referendum was valid and binding. The results were as follows:

- Question 1 on Winter Olympics:

"Yes": 30,28%; "No": 69,72%; Result: rejected

- Question 2 on the metro:

"Yes": 55,11%; "No": 44,89%; Result: approved

- Question 3 on CCTV monitoring:

"Yes": 69,73%; "No": 30,27%; Result: approved

- Question 4 on bicycle paths:

"Yes": 85,20%; "No": 14,80%; Result: approved

== Aftermath ==
Shortly after the official results of the referendum Kraków's mayor announced that the city would withdraw its bid for the Winter Olympics.
