= Demänovská Dolina =

- Municipality
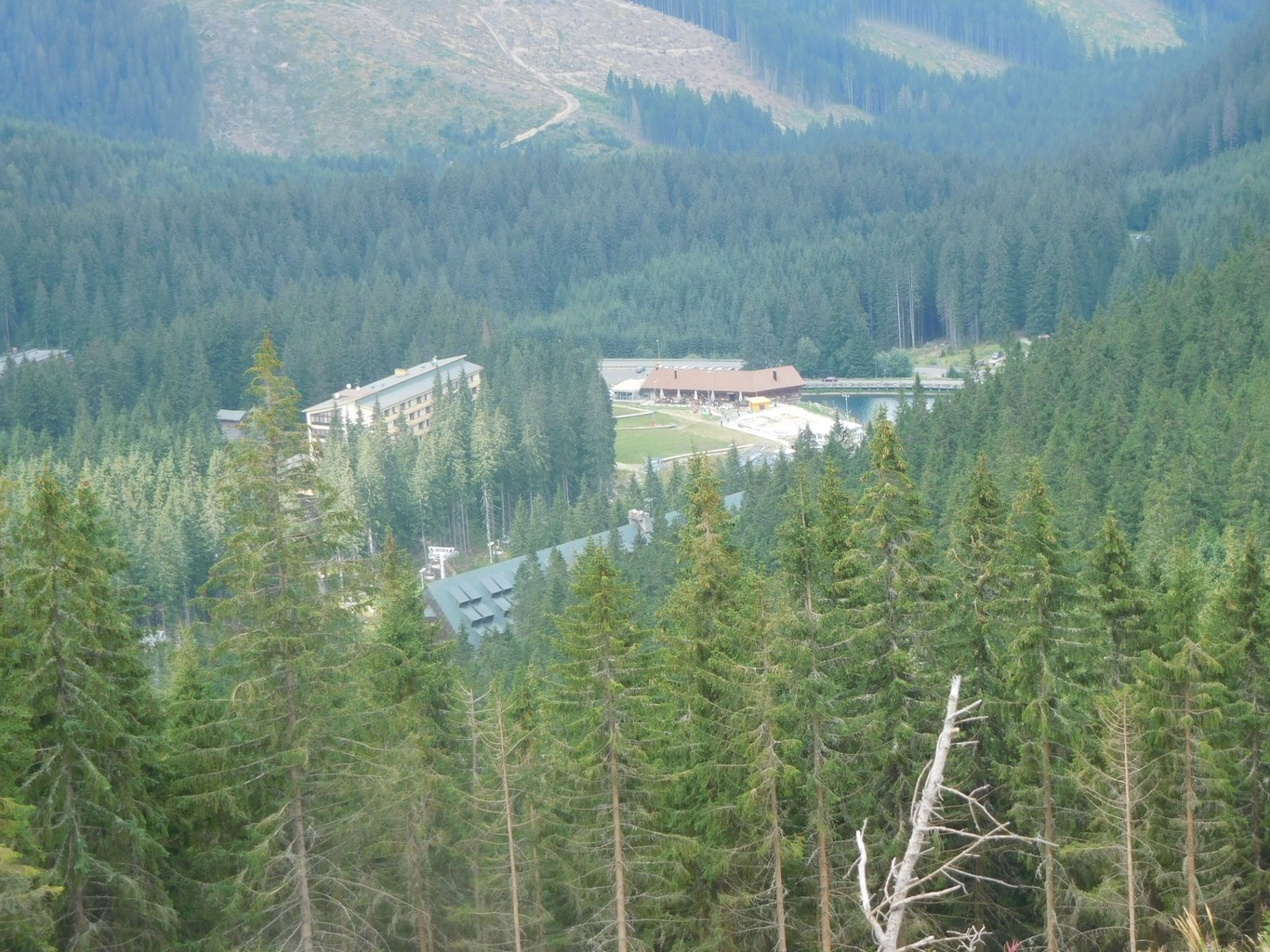
- The forested Demänovská valley gives its name to the whole municipality

- Flag Coat of arms

- Location of Demänovská Dolina in the Žilina Region Location of Demänovská Dolina in Slovakia
- Coordinates: 48.97°N 19.58°E
- Country: Slovakia
- Region: Žilina Region
- District: Liptovský Mikuláš District
- First mentioned: 1964

Area
  - Total: 47.84 km^{2} (18.47 sq mi)
- Elevation: 1,109 m (3,638 ft)

Population (2025)
  - Total: 379
- Time zone: UTC+1 (CET)
  - Summer (DST): UTC+2 (CEST)
- Postal code: 325 1
- Area code: +421 44
- Vehicle registration plate (until 2022): LM
- Website: www.demanovskadolina.info

Demänovská Dolina (Hungarian: Deménvölgy) is a village and municipality in Liptovský Mikuláš District in the Žilina Region of northern Slovakia. More precisely, it is situated in Demänovská valley, where Demänovská Cave of Liberty and Demänovská Ice Cave can be found.

== History ==
The municipality was founded in 1964. Before the establishment of independent Czechoslovakia in 1918, its territory was part of Liptó County within the Kingdom of Hungary. From 1939 to 1945, it was part of the Slovak Republic.

== Geography ==
The municipality lies at an altitude of 1,109 metres (3,638 ft) and covers an area of 47.84 km^{2} (18.47 sq mi) (2025).

== Population ==
Population statistic (10 years)
Year	1995	2005	2015	2025
Count	193	212	301	379
Difference		+9.84%	+41.98%	+25.91%

Population statistic
Year	2024	2025
Count	369	379
Difference		+2.71%

It has a population of 379 people (31 December 2025).

=== Ethnicity ===
Census 2021 (1+ %)
Ethnicity	Number	Fraction
Slovak	285	89.9%
Not found out	29	9.14%
Total	317	

In year 2021 was 317 people by ethnicity 285 as Slovak, 29 as Not found out, 2 as Czech, 2 as Rusyn, 1 as Russian and 1 as German.

Note on population: The difference values of population numbers in the table "Population statistic" and in the sections "Ethnicity" & "Religion" is caused by the use of various statistical methods.

=== Religion ===
Census 2021 (1+ %)
Religion	Number	Fraction
None	135	42.59%
Roman Catholic Church	103	32.49%
Not found out	29	9.15%
Evangelical Church	27	8.52%
Ad hoc movements	12	3.79%
Greek Catholic Church	6	1.89%
Total	317	

In year 2021 was 317 people by religion 135 from None, 103 from Roman Catholic Church, 29 from Not found out, 27 from Evangelical Church, 12 from Ad hoc movements, 6 from Greek Catholic Church, 3 from Buddhism, 1 from Jewish community and 1 from Eastern Orthodox Church.
