= Demänovská Ice Cave =

Cave in Slovakia

Coordinates: 48°59′55″N 19°34′55″E

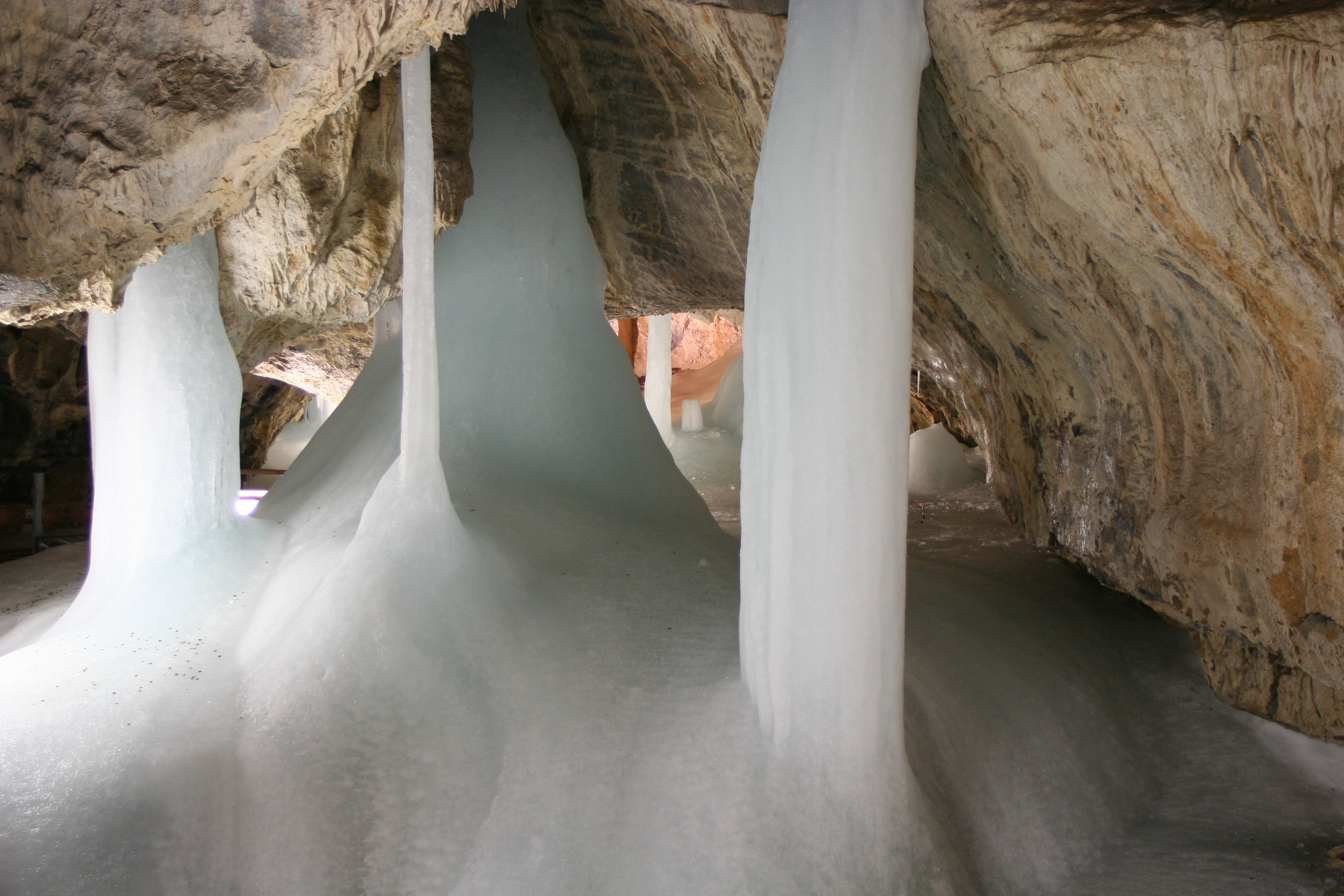
Demänová Ice Cave

Demänovská Ice Cave or Demänovská ľadová jaskyňa (in Slovak) is an ice cave in the Demänovská Valley (Low Tatra) in Slovakia. It was first mentioned in 1299 and is one of oldest known caves in Europe. After the opening of Demänovská jaskyňa Slobody in 1924, interest in this cave declined. It was reopened to the public after the reconstruction of wooden stairs and electrical lighting in 1952, with 680 m accessible out of the 1,975 m. Currently, the route for visitors is 850 m long and takes about 45 minutes to traverse.
