= Demänovská Cave of Liberty =

Karst cave in Slovakia

- Slovak: Demänovská jaskyňa slobody
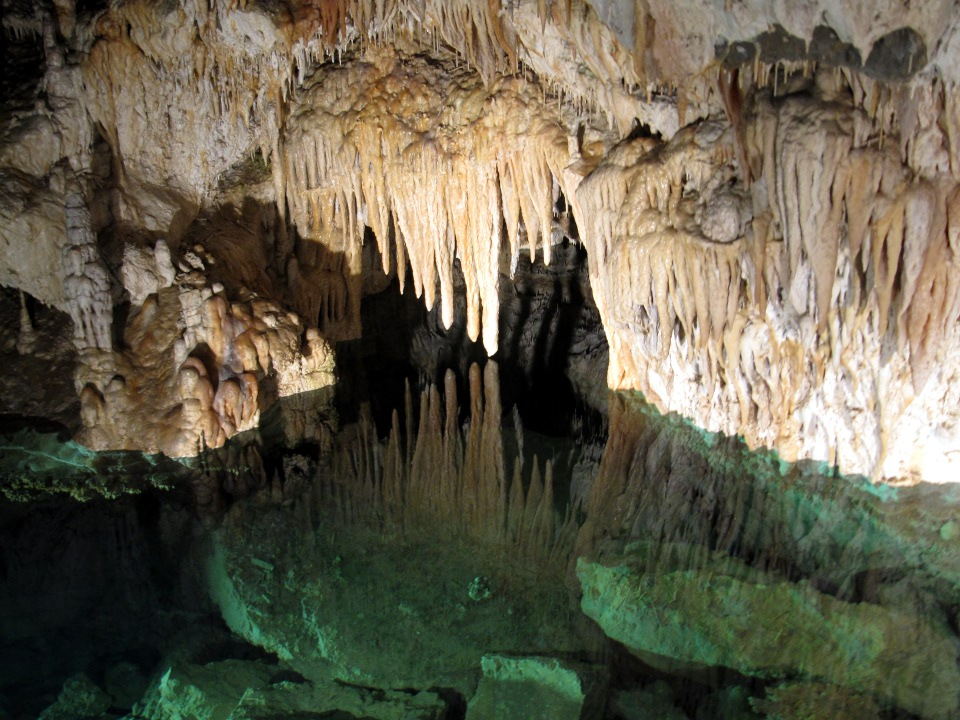
- The Emerald Lake

- Location within Slovakia
- Location: Demänovská Dolina, Slovakia
- Coordinates: 48°59′55″N 19°34′55″E
- Length: 8,126 m (5,0 mi)
- Elevation: 870 m (2,850 ft)
- Discovery: 1921
- Geology: Karst
- Visitors: 118,703 (2019)

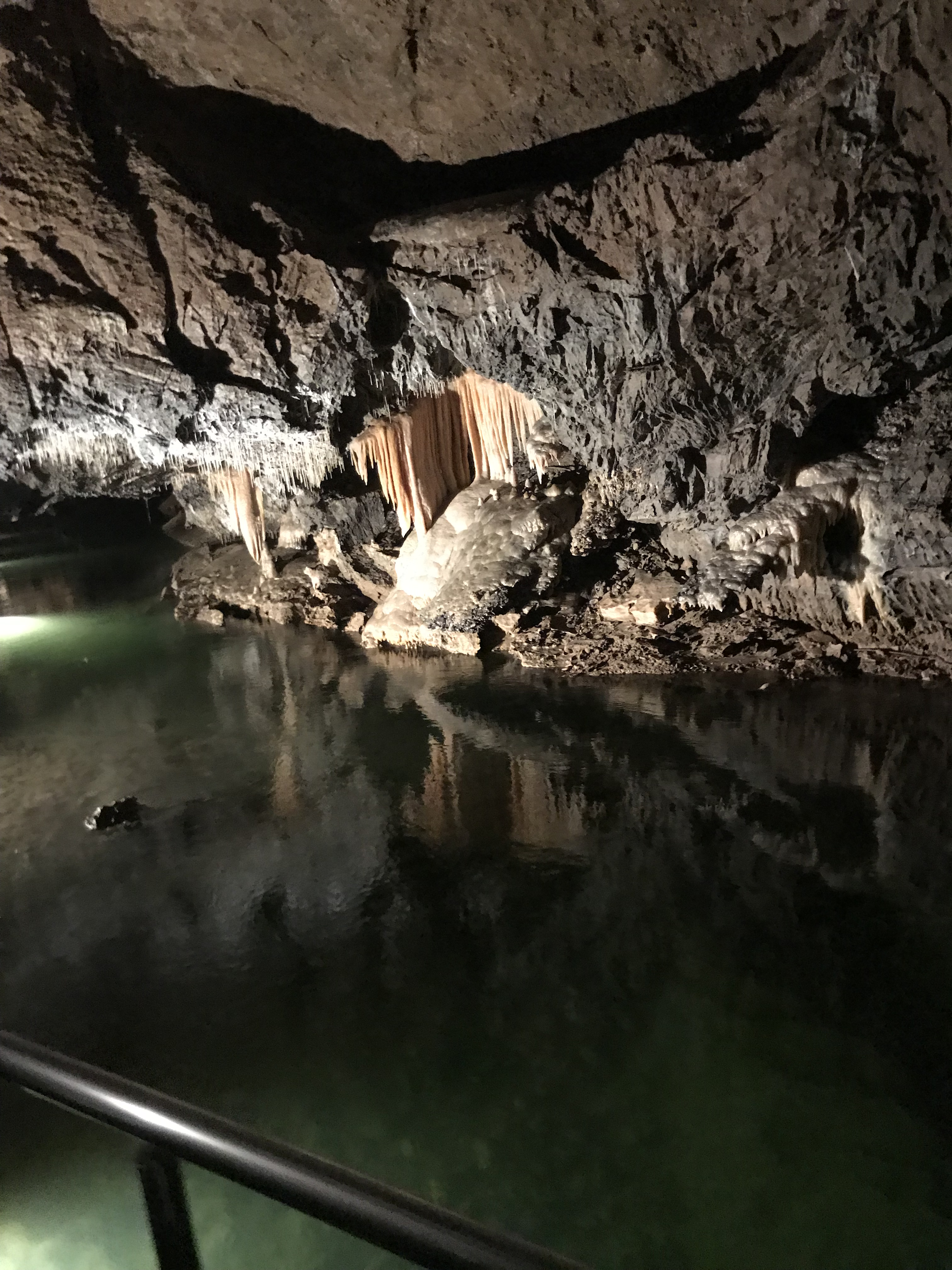

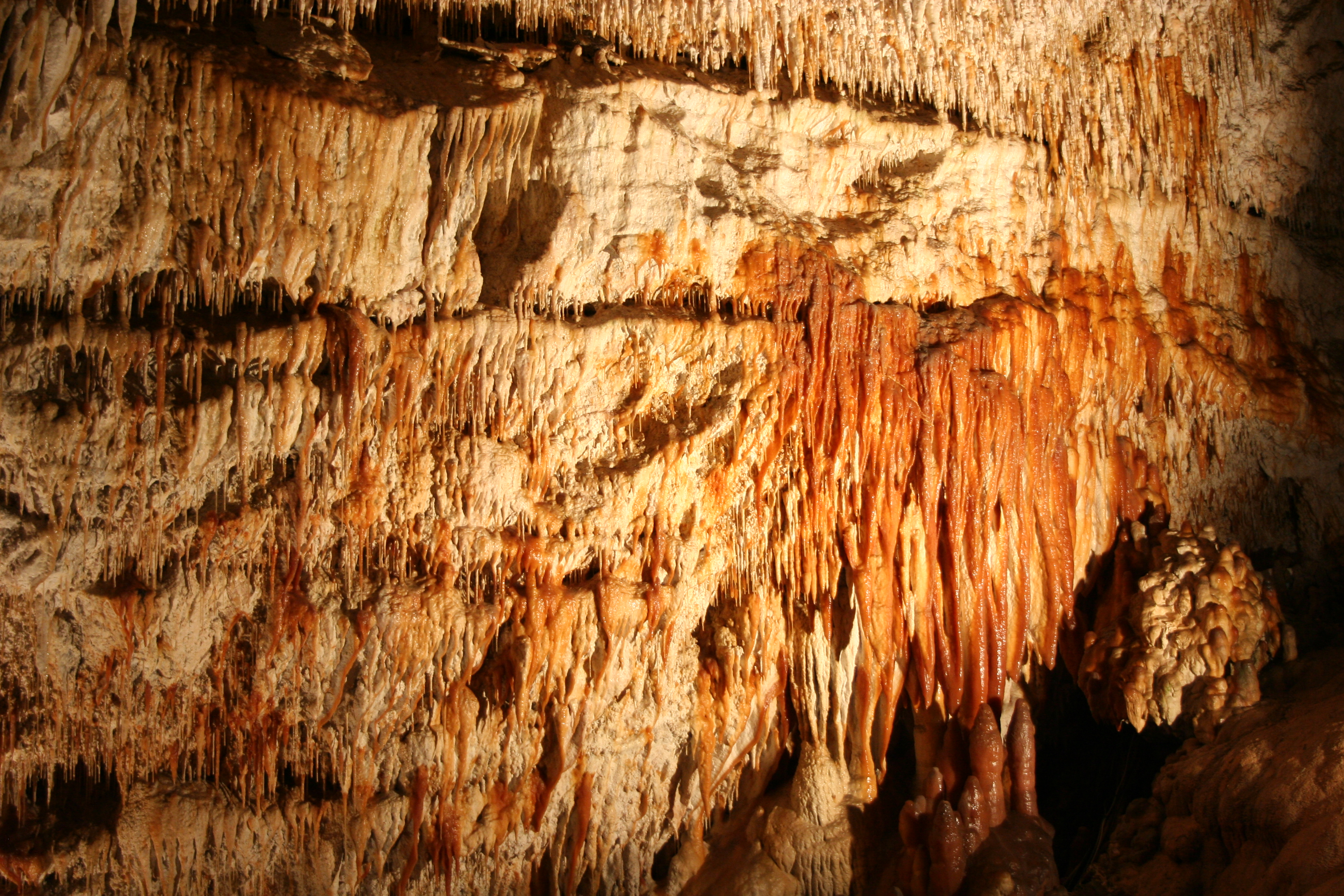
Decoration in the cave

Demänovská Cave of Liberty (Slovak: Demänovská jaskyňa slobody) is a karst cave in Low Tatras, Slovakia. The cave was discovered in 1921, and, opened to the public in 1924. It is the most visited cave in Slovakia.

The public entrance is at an altitude of 870 metres (2,850 ft). The entire cave has a length of 8,126 metres (5.0 mi), but, only 1,800 metres (1.1 mi) are open to the public.

Cave bear bones were found in a passage now named Bear's Passage (Slovak: Medvedia chodba).

Large domes have been created with the largest being the Great Dome, which is 41m high, with a length of 75m and width of 35m.

== See also ==
- List of caves in Slovakia
