= Chicago bid for the 2016 Summer Olympics =

Bid for the 2016 Summer Olympics

Bids for the 2016 Summer Olympics and Paralympics
Overview
- Games of the XXXI Olympiad; XV Paralympic Games

- Winner: Rio de Janeiro; Runner-up: Madrid; Shortlist: Tokyo · Chicago

Details
- City: Chicago, United States
- Chair: Patrick Ryan
- NOC: United States Olympic Committee

Evaluation
- IOC score: 7.0

Previous Games hosted
- None • Bid for 1952 and 1956 (It was elected to host the 1904 Summer Olympics, but they were transferred to St. Louis in a 14–2 vote of the IOC).

Decision
- Result: 3rd runner-up (18 votes)

The Chicago bid for the 2016 Summer Olympics and Paralympics was an unsuccessful bid, first recognized by the International Olympic Committee (IOC) on September 14, 2007. The IOC shortlisted four of the seven applicant cities—Madrid, Spain; Tokyo, Japan; Rio de Janeiro, Brazil; and Chicago, United States; over Baku, Azerbaijan; Doha, Qatar; and Prague, Czech Republic—on June 4, 2008, during a meeting in Athens, Greece. This was followed by an intensive bidding process which finished with the election of Rio de Janeiro at the 121st IOC Session in Copenhagen, Denmark, on October 2, 2009.

In Chicago's bid, the games would have been held from July 22 to August 7, with the Paralympics held between August 12 and 28. The bid plan emphasized use of Chicago Park District parks to host the games, but other existing facilities such as Soldier Field and McCormick Place would have hosted events. The bid included a plan for North Side, Downtown Loop and South Side celebration locations that would have had high-definition LED screens for unticketed visitors. The bid noted that there was a very high concentration of event locations and training facilities close to each other and that the majority of event sites were clustered together. Thus, the vast majority of athletes would have been close to their competitions.

Chicago earned a general score of 7.0 during the Applicant phase, after a detailed study of the Applicant Files received by the IOC Working Group on January 14, 2008. Between April 4 and 7, 2009, the IOC Evaluation Commission, led by Nawal El Moutawakel, arrived in Chicago to assess the conditions of the city. The Commission attended technical presentations, participated in question-and-answer sessions about the Candidature File, and made inspections in all the existing venues across the city.

Though considered a favorite entering the voting process, and despite personal appeals from such high-profile Chicagoans as U.S. President Barack Obama, Michelle Obama, and Oprah Winfrey, the bid faced considerable organized grassroots opposition, including from the coalitions No Games Chicago and the Unlympics Organizing Committee. Opponents cited the history of cost overruns pervasive to Olympic bids in a time of considerable public debt and the sentiment that funds for the Olympics should instead fund public schools and public clinics. Surveys of Chicagoans in the run-up to the bid saw support for the bid fall below 50%, and Chicago was eliminated on the first ballot in IOC voting on October 2, 2009, with 18 votes in a three-round exhaustive ballot of the IOC.

On October 2, 2009, Chicago was knocked out in the first round of voting, and the Olympics went to Rio de Janeiro, despite some high-profile backers, such as US President Barack Obama and Chicago-based television hostess Oprah Winfrey, going to Copenhagen to support the bid. Seven years later, the 2016 state-funded Olympics in Rio proved to be a financial disaster, and many argued that privately funded games in Chicago, where most of the venues were existing or temporary ones, would have fared far better.

The United States Olympic Committee (USOC) selected Chicago over Houston, Los Angeles, Philadelphia and San Francisco as its candidate city to host the 2016 Summer Olympics and 2016 Summer Paralympics on April 14, 2007. This is the city's third failure, after two failed attempts for the 1952 and the 1956 Summer Olympics (and fourth overall attempt, as Chicago won the 1904 Olympics, but they were moved to St. Louis, as the World's Fair was there and threatened to host a competing competition if the Olympics were not moved). Olympic Games in North America, including the 2010 Winter Olympics in Vancouver, British Columbia, Canada, hurt Chicago's bid. It would have been the ninth Olympics hosted in the United States, after the 1904, 1932, 1984 and 1996 Summer Olympics; and the 1932, 1960, 1980 and 2002 Winter Olympics.

After Chicago's failure, the United States will not host the Olympics until the 2028 Summer Games when Los Angeles hosts the Summer Olympics for the third time.

== USOC city selection ==
Chicago mayor Richard M. Daley and his staff began considering the possibility of hosting the Olympics in early 2005, during the New York City bid for the 2012 Summer Olympics. After New York lost to London in July 2005, these plans were revealed to the public for the first time. Daley had previously said that he was not interested in an Olympic bid because of the cost. While several other American cities made formal proposals to the U.S. Olympic Committee (USOC) in late 2005 and early 2006, the USOC told the candidates "not to spend a great deal of time and money on forming bid committees until we have made a decision about whether to proceed with a bid for 2016". Accordingly, the city of Chicago did not create a formal bid committee until May 2006.

Chicago vied for the 2016 Olympics alongside four other cities, all needing the USOC's approval to make a bid: Houston, Los Angeles, Philadelphia, and San Francisco. The USOC's chairman at the time, Peter Ueberroth, visited all potential host cities during April and May 2006. He visited Chicago on May 10. On July 26, 2006, the USOC narrowed its list of American applicant cities to three: Chicago, Los Angeles and San Francisco. San Francisco withdrew its application on November 13, 2006, after the San Francisco 49ers pulled out of a deal for the construction of a new stadium that would be the centerpiece of the games.

The final stage of the USOC internal selection occurred on April 14, 2007, at Washington, D.C.'s Embassy Row Hotel, where the two remaining bid cities, Chicago and Los Angeles, made a last 40-minute presentation to the USOC board members. At about 21:00 UTC, Chicago was announced as the winner of the United States bid for the 2016 Summer Olympics by Ueberroth. The vote totals were not disclosed.

== Bid details ==
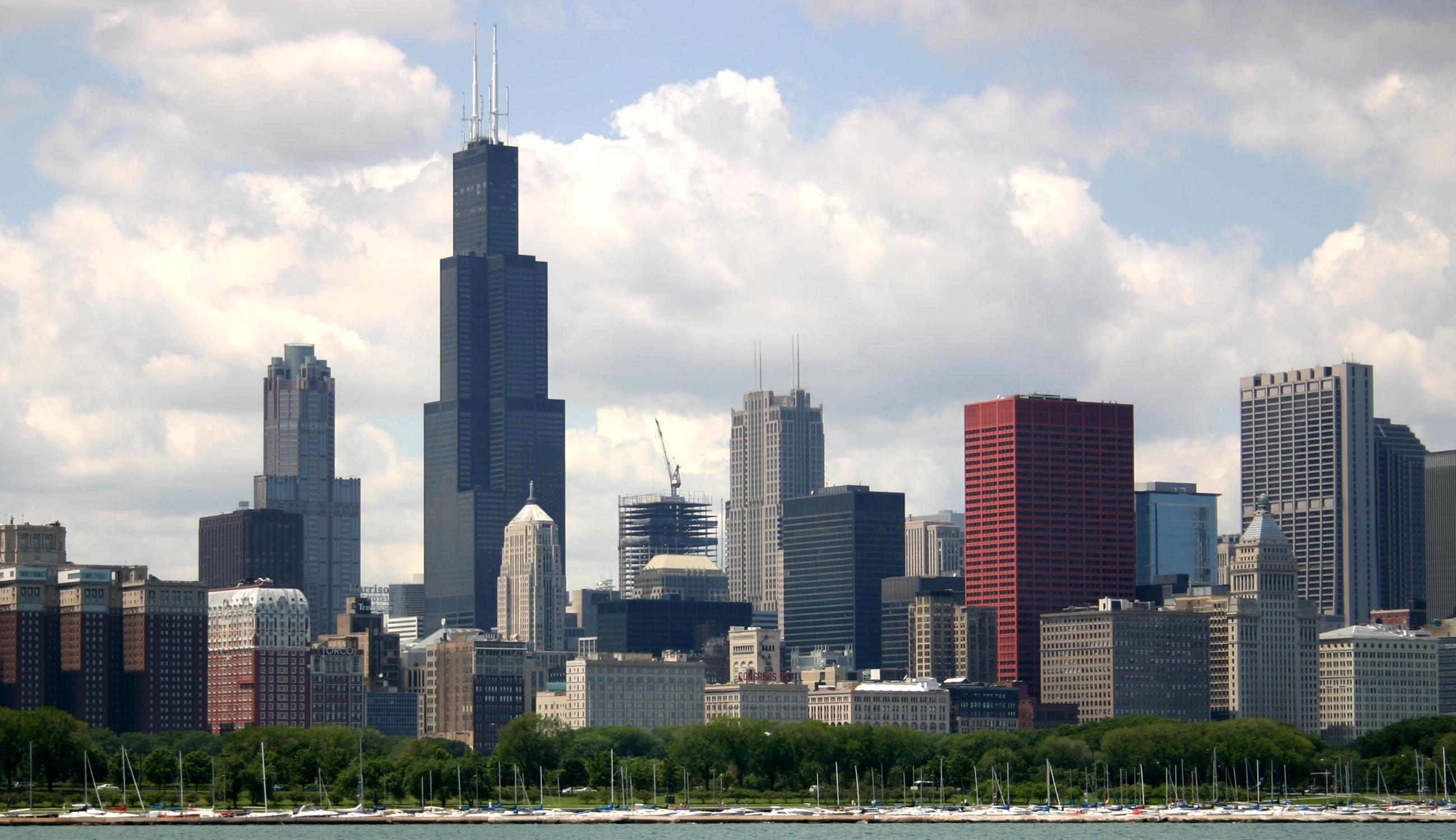
Chicago Skyline from Lake Michigan

Chicago had prior experience with Olympic bids. In 1901, the city was unanimously chosen by the IOC to stage the 1904 Summer Olympics, but the Games were moved to St. Louis to coincide with the 1904 World's Fair. Chicago also bid for the 1952 and 1956 Summer Olympics, without success. Mayor of Chicago Richard M. Daley visited Beijing – host city of the 2008 Summer Olympics – on May 15, 2006, where he collected information on hosting. The bidding process for the 2016 Summer Olympics was officially launched on May 16, 2007.

In June 2007, Olympic bid committee chairman and CEO, Patrick G. Ryan announced that David P. Bolger was appointed chief operating officer and Rick Ludwig as chief financial officer.

The Chicago 2016 Olympic bid committee announced the details of the Olympic bid application on January 15, 2008. 22 of the 27 Olympic venues were to be in four clusters within 15 km of the Olympic Village. Five new venues and eleven temporary venues would have been built for the games at a cost of $49.3 million; these construction costs, and the costs of the games were to be borne by the private sector, with the government financing the infrastructure.

The bid committee filed a 600-page candidacy file with the IOC in Lausanne, Switzerland on February 12, 2009. The file responded to 227 questions given to each candidate city. On February 13, the candidacy file with the final version of Chicago's 2016 Olympic plan was publicly released.

Chicago 2016 Olympic bid politician and celebrity supporters
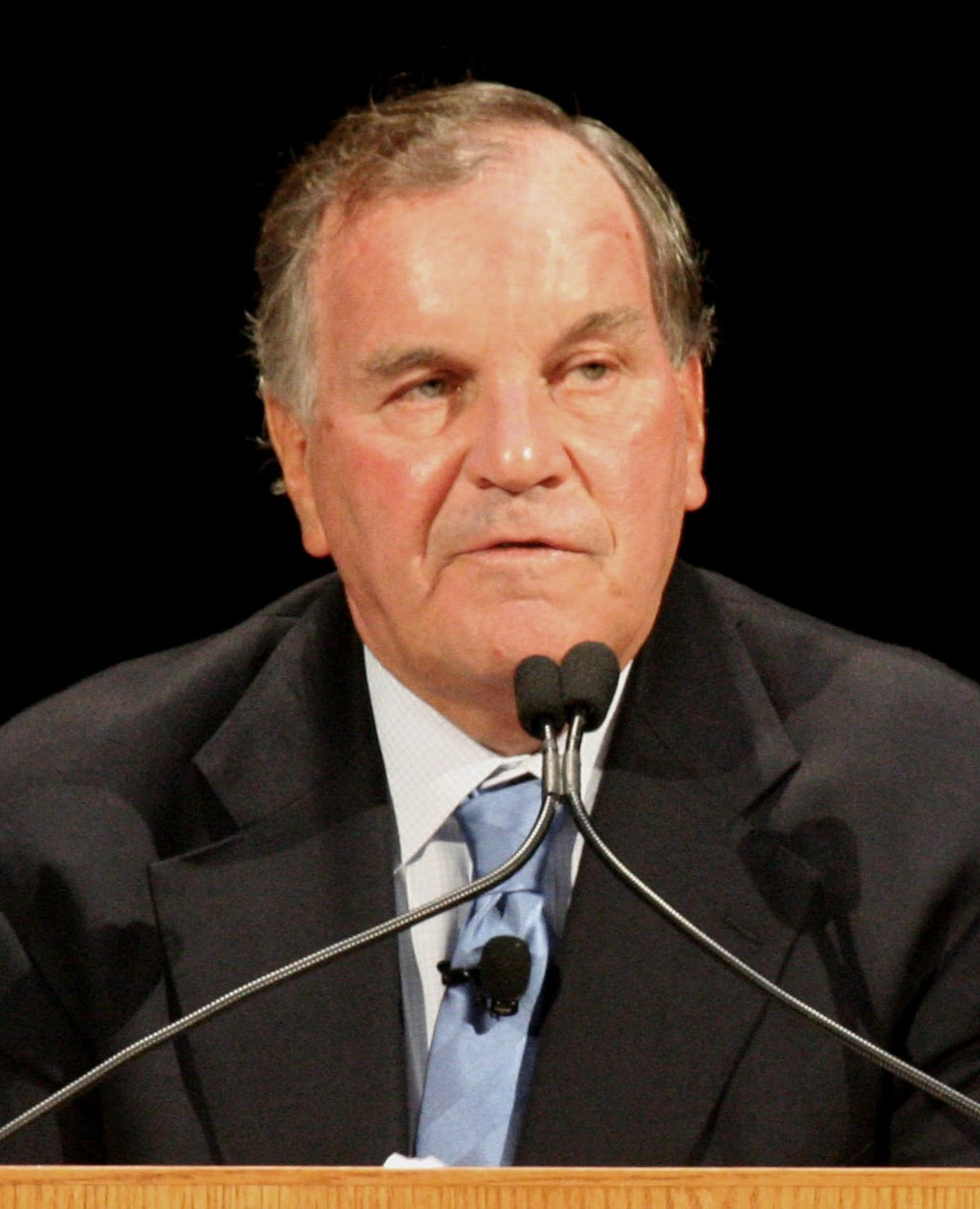
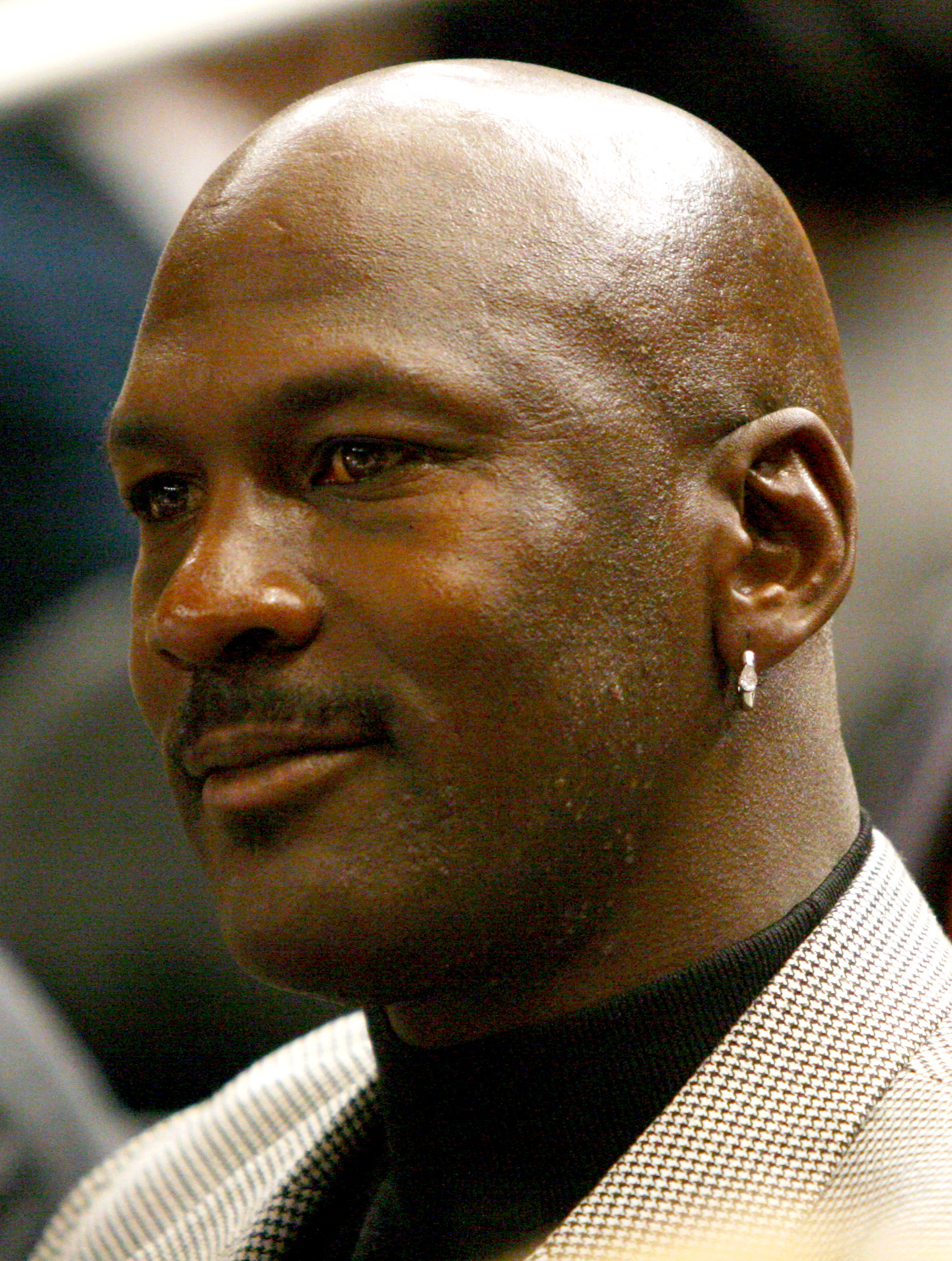
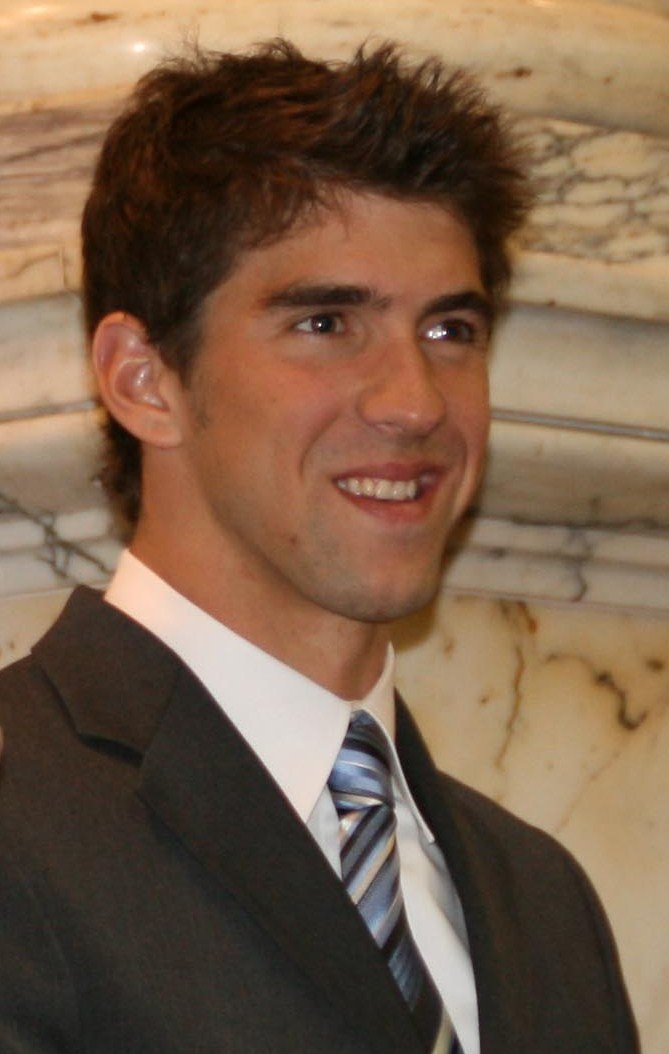
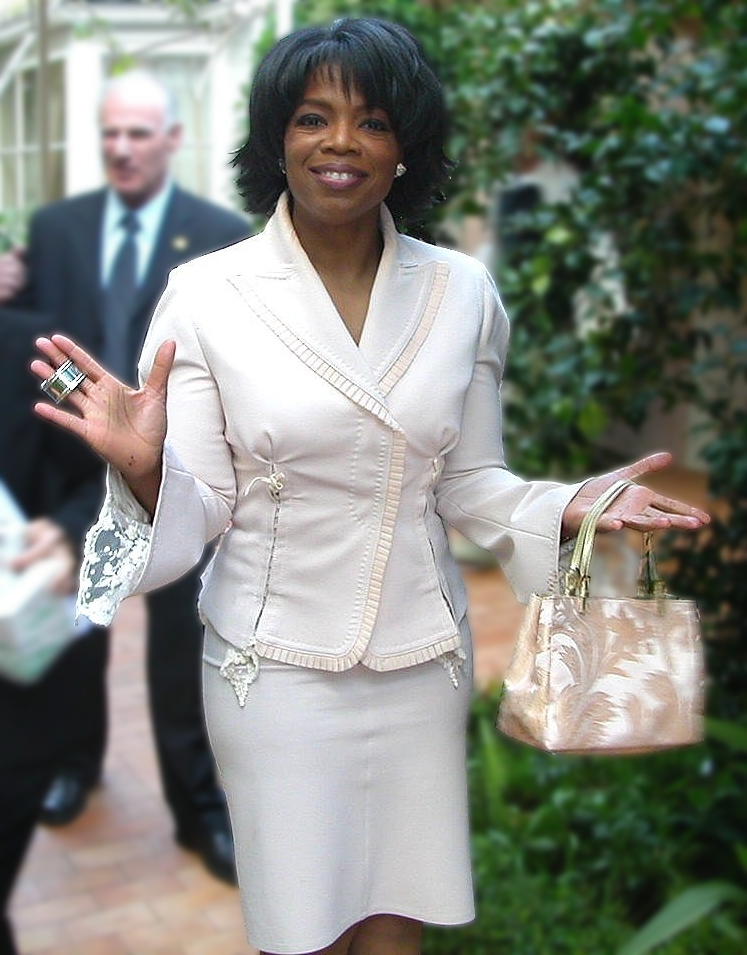
(left to right) President of the United States Barack Obama, Mayor of Chicago Richard M. Daley, Olympians Michael Jordan and Michael Phelps and celebrity Oprah Winfrey

Chicago's bid was supported by major preliminary corporate commitments, philanthropic efforts by wealthy Chicagoans, promised planning participation by a wide range of community and government leaders, and the enthusiasm of the citizenry. Local support for the bid on the South Side, particularly in the Washington Park and Woodlawn community areas, was divided. Ben Joravsky, a Chicago Reader columnist, was one of the strongest critics of the Chicago 2016 bid. However, 2007 opinion polls indicated 76 percent public support. In 2009, as the final selection approached, opponents of the bid became vocal even though organizers seemed to be pleased with the bid's progress and presentation. Peter Ueberroth stated, "Chicago is going in the right direction, and we are impressed by that."

Long-time Chicago resident and then current President of the United States Barack Obama was a supporter of Chicago's bid since its inception and noted his support during his Presidential election victory speech in Grant Park. President Barack Obama and First Lady Michelle Obama traveled to Denmark to support Chicago's bid for the 2016 Summer Olympics. Michael Jordan was an unofficial spokesman for Chicago's bid. Chicago media mogul Oprah Winfrey and Olympic champion Michael Phelps had been widely promoting the bid since the 2008 Summer Olympics.

The bid plan emphasized use of Chicago Park District parks (Washington Park, Burnham Park, Lincoln Park, Douglass Park and Grant Park). In addition, existing facilities such as Soldier Field and McCormick Place would have hosted events. In addition to the event sites, the bid included North side, downtown Loop and South Side celebration locations in Lincoln and Grant Parks as well as the Midway Plaisance respectively that would have had JumboTrons for unticketed visitors. The bid noted the high concentration of event locations; the majority of event sites would have been clustered together.

=== Financing ===
Chicago 2016 Olympic bid funding supporters
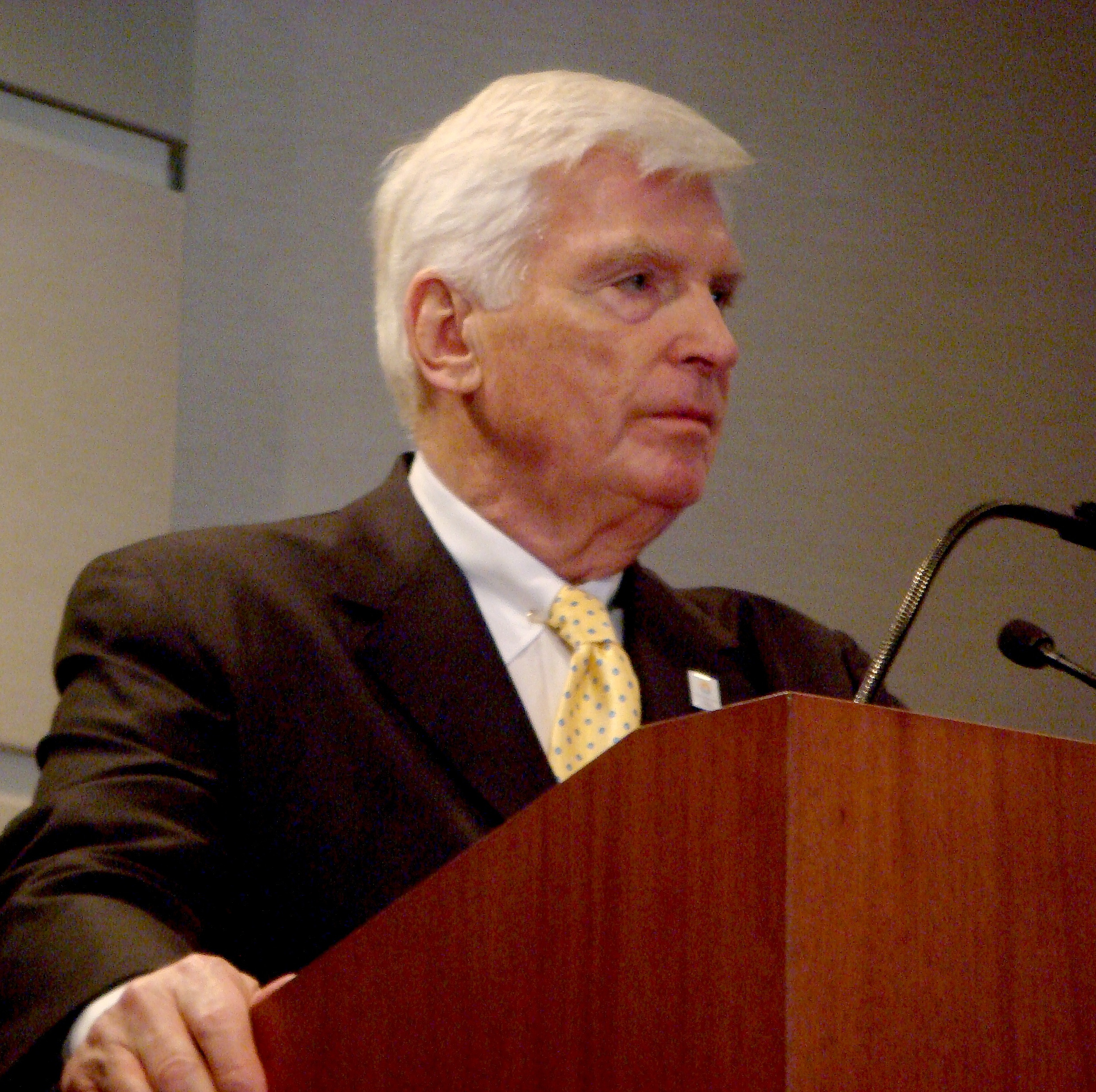
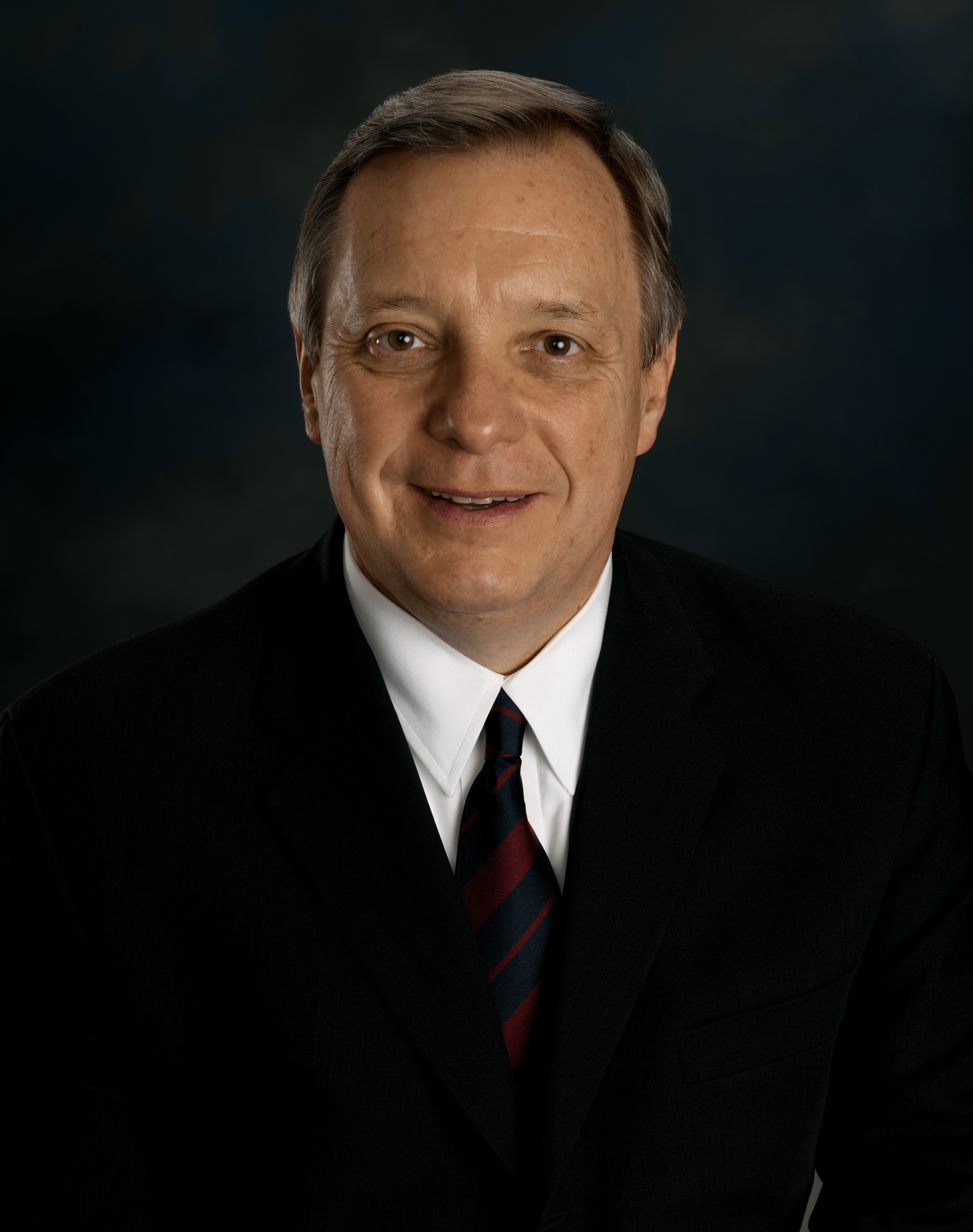
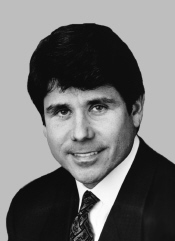
1. Chairman and CEO Patrick G. Ryan, Senior
2. United States Senator Dick Durbin, and
3. former Governor of Illinois Rod Blagojevich.
In addition, former Governor of Illinois Pat Quinn, has been instrumental in securing funding commitments.

Ueberroth and members of the national committee met with Daley on May 10, 2006, for the initial assessment. Daley appointed business executive Patrick G. Ryan of Aon Corporation, part-owner of the Chicago Bears, to lead the city's bid process, especially in areas of corporate participation in fundraising.

Mayor Daley said on May 10, 2006, that the Olympics "cannot become a financial burden to the taxpayers of Chicago and Illinois." "The goal is to have the Olympics be totally privately funded and we have unparalleled support from the business community," a mayoral spokeswoman said in July 2006. Daley insisted that no tax money would be used to pay for the city to host the 2016 Summer Olympics and said funding from the private sector and federal dollars for security and infrastructure would cover the costs. "Tax money isn't paying for it," Daley said on February 7, 2009. "The federal government pays for security, which is the highest cost of the Olympics ... The other thing they pay for is infrastructure ... There's no city tax money whatsoever ... We are very strong in that position ... in the regard to having that be sponsored by the private sector and others." In previous years, Daley opposed possible bids for the 2008 and 2012 Summer Olympics owing to former international committee financial-guarantee requirements. The 2016 financial guarantee requirements were not initially formalized.

Early cost estimates hovered at $5 billion, with $1.1 billion for the lakeside Olympic Village and an additional estimated $366 million for a temporary 80,000 seat Olympic Stadium to be built in Washington Park. Nonetheless, the proposed budget was small in comparison to the Beijing Olympics, which are estimated to have cost $40 billion. Further, the 2004 Athens Summer Olympics, initially budgeted to cost $2.4 billion, in fact cost $9 billion. On April 11, 2007, former Governor of Illinois Rod Blagojevich proposed $150 million in state funding to help secure the bid to the USOC for Chicago. Then current Governor Pat Quinn stated that he would be willing to support any funding necessary to secure the Olympics for Chicago. By April 14, over $35 million in cash and $13 million in goods had been pledged, including donations in excess of $100,000 from at least 225 individuals and corporations. Chicago had strong allies to pursue federal funds for security and transportation: U.S. Senator Dick Durbin was the second in command among Democratic Senators as the Whip, and former Senator Barack Obama had become the President of the United States. The city announced a $500 million insurance policy against cost overruns and revenue shortfalls.

=== Venues ===
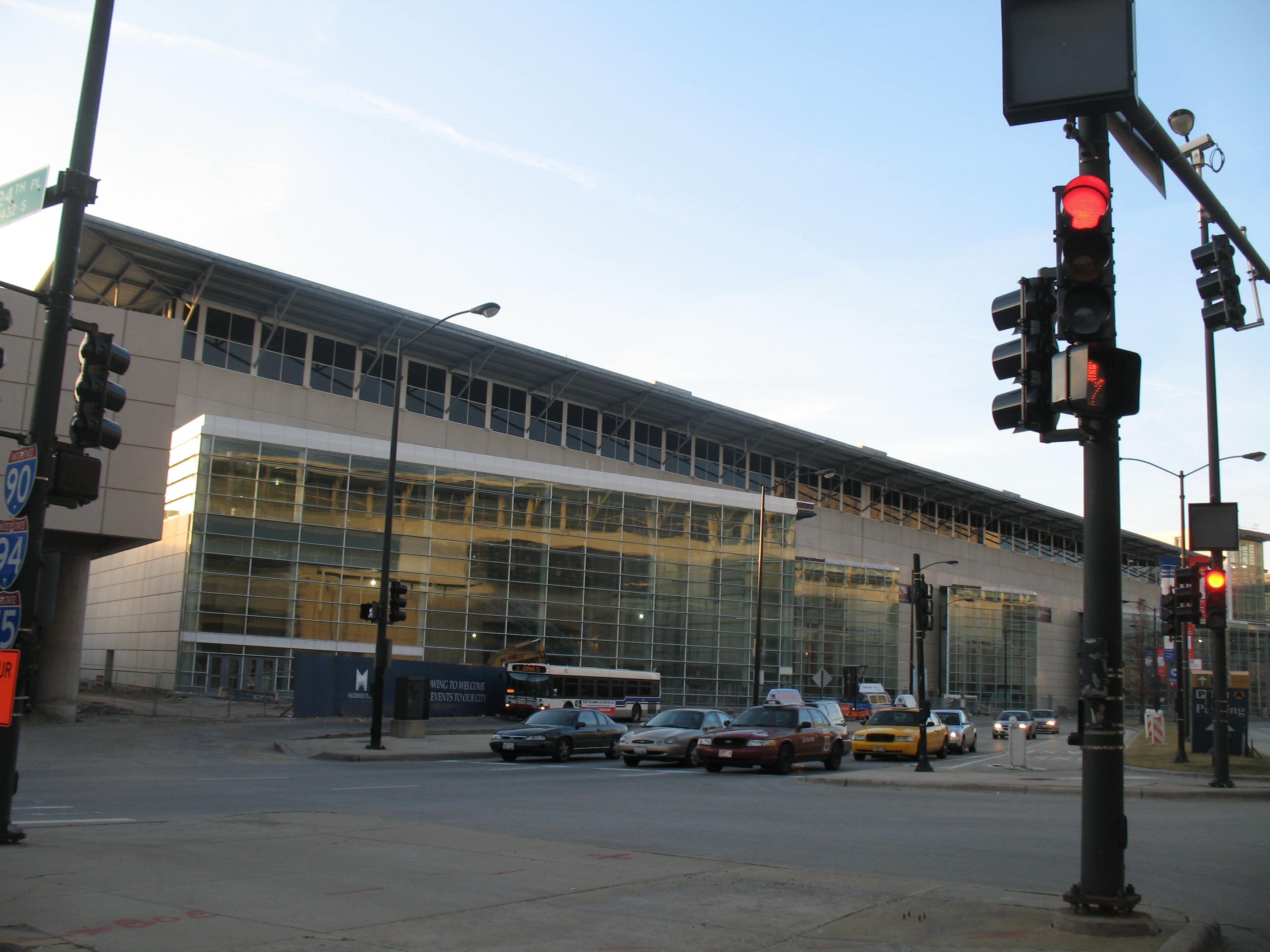
McCormick Place would have hosted multiple sports had Chicago hosted the games.

Despite the lack of an Olympic stadium, Chicago had dozens of existing sport venues: Soldier Field, United Center, U.S. Cellular Field, Wrigley Field, Allstate Arena in Rosemont, Sears Centre in Hoffman Estates, and Toyota Park (now SeatGeek Stadium) in Bridgeview. Venues at Loyola University Chicago, Northwestern University, the University of Chicago, the University of Illinois at Chicago, Chicago State University, Northern Illinois University, and the University of Illinois at Urbana–Champaign, among others, were also available and had been mentioned in early news reports as possibilities. Northerly Island and the lakefront along Lake Michigan would have hosted all beach and water events. The McCormick Place convention center, the second largest in the world, was the planned venue for indoor events like judo and weightlifting, as well as hosting all press offices, while Archery and the medals podium were slated for Grant Park.

Preliminary soccer matches would have been played in several venues, of which a few were slated to have been temporarily renamed in line with the IOC prohibition against corporate naming rights sponsorships to be used for venue names. These venues included MetLife Stadium in East Rutherford, New Jersey (which would have been temporarily renamed "New York Field" for the Olympics); the Rose Bowl in Pasadena, California; Lincoln Financial Field ("Philadelphia Field") in Philadelphia, Pennsylvania; the Edward Jones Dome in St. Louis, Missouri ("St. Louis Dome"); FedExField in Landover, Maryland ("Landover Field"); and TCF Bank Stadium ("Minneapolis Stadium"), a new stadium which opened in September 2009 on the campus of the University of Minnesota in Minneapolis, Minnesota.

Swimming events were originally planned to be held in the West Side's Douglass Park, but in a December 2008 plan revision the swimming events would have moved to Washington Park and a velodrome for track and BMX cycling events would have moved from Northerly Island to Douglass Park. The Cycling hub would have been in Madison, Wisconsin.

While some venues might have changed at short notice, the Chicago 2016 Bid Book indicated that the following venues would have been permanently constructed: an Aquatic Center, the Olympic Stadium (to a limited long-term degree), a Canoe/Flatwater/Rowing area at Monroe Harbor, a Canoe/Kayak-Slalom Course, a velodrome in Douglass Park, and Field Hockey Fields in Jackson Park.

==== Rowing ====
The Monroe Harbor would have been enlarged with a $60-million breakwater to accommodate an approximately 2-mile (3.2 km) course for rowing events. This would have enabled rowing competitions to take place on a course running from Northerly Island to about Randolph Street. This course would have featured a picturesque Chicago Loop skyline backdrop for television viewing, which by 2016 might have included the Chicago Spire, if it was completed. In order to accommodate the Olympics, all non-Olympic watercraft would have been required to vacate Monroe Harbor for a year. Canoeing events would have been held in the former location of Meigs Field on Northerly Island near the Adler Planetarium. Historically, this site staged some venues for the 1933 World's Fair.

==== Stadium ====
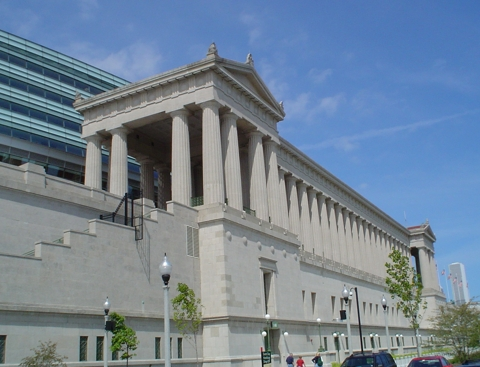
Soldier Field would not have served as the main Olympic Stadium in Chicago. However, the sports venue would have hosted several soccer matches, including the Olympic Soccer finals.

The Olympic Stadium would have been built in Washington Park, a site listed on the National Register of Historic Places in the Washington Park community area of the same name on the city's south side. Chicago initially proposed building a temporary 80,000-seat track stadium adjacent to Soldier Field and having the two stadiums host dual opening and closing ceremonies. However, the final proposal called for a $366 million temporary stadium to be built in Washington Park. The stadium would have been replaced by a 10,000 seat multi-use venue after the games. The smaller post-Olympic stadium would have been more in line with public interest in restoring the historic park after the games. The new stadium would have featured a high-tech reflective sheathing material to accommodate huge TV picture projections on its outside walls. The temporary stadium would not have had concessions inside the stadium, unlike permanent local venues, although concessions were planned outside the stadium. The stadium would have featured a basic oval shape, but it would also have adhered to Olympic design rules which dictate that there must be an overhanging lip at one end to cover dignitaries and the media. IOC president Jacques Rogge praised Chicago's design in November 2007 as a possible "blueprint for the future", reflecting the desire of the IOC to make the games both more affordable and to have a smaller ecological footprint on the host city.

==== Olympic Village ====
The Olympic Village for housing athletes during the games would have been a $1.1-billion series of newly constructed lakefront buildings that would have been converted to rental and condominium units after the games. The village was to be located immediately south of McCormick Place, which was expected to host 11 event venues, on a current truck parking lot between South Lake Shore Drive and the Illinois Central Railroad tracks in the Near South Side and Douglas community areas. At the time, the parking lot was being used to stage events at McCormick Place. The village was slated to have pedways over Lake Shore Drive. This location was meant to enable 88% of the Olympic athletes to be within 15 minutes of their competition venue.

Initially, the Olympic Village was to be located entirely on the McCormick Place truck yards, but in November 2006, The Michael Reese Hospital site became listed for sale. Planners determined that the hospital site would likely have been superior in terms of lower cost and more successful urban planning implementation. In November 2007, Mayor Daley announced a plan to acquire the 37-acre (150,000 m^{2}) site, and the following June the hospital decided that it would cease operations. In July 2008 the city announced its official bid for the property: The city planned to borrow $85 million to buy the Michael Reese Hospital campus, near 31st and King Drive, from its current owner, Medline Industries. Medline would only get $65 million, because the company agreed to make a $20 million "charitable contribution" back to the city. The city would use that $20 million to pay up to five years of interest on its $85 million debt, demolish the hospital, and clean up the site. Then sometime in the next couple years it planned to sell the site for at least $85 million to a developer or developers, who in turn were expected to build a complex big enough to house about 15,000 Olympians. After the games the developer would sell or rent out the units.

In September 2008, the city realized it had underestimated demolition and environmental cleanup costs, which put the transaction at risk. Additionally in September the Associated Press reported a recalcitrant property owner may force the hospital site to be abandoned. These problems needed resolution by the bid committee by February 2009, the date which bid books were due. That month, the city requested a renegotiation of terms and within a week Michael Reese hospital filed for chapter 11 bankruptcy. In December 2008, new terms for the deal became public. Although original financing plans included no taxpayer funding, the late deal was only possible with $500 million of taxpayer participation via a guarantee by the city to cover possible revenue shortfall and $45 million for Chicago Police Department costs. In addition, in early 2008, records were uncovered that show the campus of Michael Reese Hospital to have been designed, in large part, by one of the twentieth century's most well-respected modernist architects, Walter Gropius. Thus, the plan for the Olympic Village battled the growing belief that preserving the old hospital campus would be better from an urban planning and historic preservation standpoint, and also rose questions about financing the village. In addition, the planned demolition of 28 buildings put the sustainability record the city was attempting to create in question.

=== Sports culture ===
Chicago benefited from a strong sports culture. On August 1, 2006, it was named Best Sports City in the US by Sporting News. Chicagoans are famous for their rabid support of their home teams: the Chicago Bears, Chicago Bulls, Chicago Cubs, Chicago White Sox, Chicago Blackhawks, Chicago Wolves, and more recently, Chicago Sky (WNBA), Chicago Fire, the Chicago Red Stars (the new women's soccer team), and the Chicago Machine. Other events such as the Chicago Marathon, one of the five World Marathon Majors, would also play a part in Chicago's Olympic-planning process.

=== Experience ===
Chicago hosted the 1959 Pan American Games.

Chicago has hosted major and historic world gatherings in the past, including the famous 1893 World's Columbian Exposition, the 1933 Century of Progress Exposition and the 1959 Pan American Games, as well as matches for the 1994 FIFA World Cup soccer tournament. Chicago has also hosted the most United States presidential nominating conventions. Chicago was scheduled to host the 1904 Summer Olympics, but the games were instead relocated to St. Louis to coincide with its Louisiana Purchase Exposition, more commonly known as the Saint Louis World's Fair. Chicago was also the first host of the Special Olympics in 1968.

More recently, Chicago hosted the Gay Games VII in July 2006, and the 2007 AIBA Boxing Championships in October 2007. The championships were a qualifying event for the 2008 Summer Olympics and a chance for Chicago to showcase its staging skills to IOC members. AIBA head Dr. Ching-kuo Wu enthused the tournament was the "best ever", especially considering the short six-month lead time Chicago had to organize the games.

=== Logo ===
On May 16, 2007, Chicago was informed that its logo, a representation of a torch with the flames reminiscent of Chicago's skyline, violated IOC rules against using Olympic torch imagery. Bidding rules prohibit logos containing the Olympic symbol, motto, flag or other imagery including a flame, torch or medal. Chicago agreed to revise the logo. The current redesigned logo was released on September 19, 2007. Using the same color palette, a unique six-pointed Chicago star represents a compass pointing in all directions reaching out to the world. Each point represents an Olympic value: Hope, Respect, Harmony, Friendship, Excellence and Celebration. The warm colors initially represented in the flame (or top) of the image refer to the sun, the cool colors represent the green parklands and blue waters of Lake Michigan. Initially beneath the logo were the words "Applicant City". Both logos were designed by Chicago-based design firm VSA Partners.

Chicago not only changed its logo, but relaunched its campaign. It changed its motto from "Stir the soul" to "Let friendship shine". Chicago used social media more than any other city bidding, and was keen to make 2016 a 'New Media Olympics'. It established a number of groups on Facebook, and on September 29, 2009, the bid's official page surpassed 100,000 members; it also used Flickr and Twitter.

Hypothetical flag of Chicago with a fifth star added, as suggested by Edward M. Burke if the 2016 Olympics had been held in the city.

Chicago City Council alderman Edward M. Burke proposed that a fifth star be added to the Flag of Chicago if the city won its bid for the 2016 Summer Olympics.

=== Bid factors ===
The bid relied on Chicago's strength in medical services and doping control, security, accommodations, transportation, technology and media operations. The city's transportation infrastructure includes the Chicago Transit Authority, known locally as the CTA, which operates a vast network of buses and elevated/subway 'L' trains, and the Metra and South Shore Line commuter rail services that connects more than 230 suburban destinations to Chicago. These transportation options would have allowed public transit access to the Games for city residents and people throughout northeastern Illinois into northern Indiana and southern Wisconsin.

Chicago's main airport, O'Hare International Airport is the second-busiest airport in the world. The Chicago region is served by two other major commercial airports, Midway and Milwaukee's General Mitchell International Airport, along with several smaller airports. The city is served by all major worldwide airlines, and O'Hare is an international hub for both American and United Airlines, while Midway is a hub for domestic carrier Southwest Airlines. There is also a considerable network of rail lines and interstate highways in the region. Chicago has over 30,000 hotel rooms in the immediate downtown area alone, and it has the largest skilled-labor workforce in the US catering to conventions and other large-scale media events.

Chicago is in the Central Time Zone (UTC −5 during the summer months), which is well adapted to North American television coverage. The NBC television network with its sister cable broadcasters is the largest media vendor and contract purchaser of the Olympic Games.

== Domain name dispute ==
Trademark controversies arose for "Chicago2016.com" and "Tokyo2016.com", when both were registered in 2004 by entrepreneur Stephen Frayne Jr., an MBA student at the Kellogg School of Management; he also claimed around 40 other domain names whose city/year format mimicked the way Olympic Games are marketed. Frayne's stated intent for the site was a "comprehensive, balanced discussion" of the benefits and pitfalls of holding the Olympics in Chicago; the Chicago 2016 committee contended that his real intent was to profit from cybersquatting. The Chicago Olympic bid organization, which had been using Chicago2016.org as its official web site, sought control of Chicago2016.com through a complaint filed with an international arbitration organization. Attempts by the USOC to have the World Intellectual Property Organization (WIPO) release the names failed. Frayne sued in the U.S. District Court in Chicago, seeking an injunction against the arbitration proceedings. On September 25, 2008, the WIPO arbitration panel granted Frayne's motion to suspend and terminate proceedings setting up a battle in the federal court in the Northern District of Illinois.

The Olympic bid candidature documentation published by the International Olympic Committee (IOC) states that each bid must "...provide documentation indicating that appropriate measures have been taken to register domain names that are of value to your candidature such as '[City] 2016' followed by extensions .com .net .org as well as the country code concerned."

== Opposition to the bid ==
A number of Chicago grassroots citizens groups organized to oppose the Chicago 2016 Olympic bid. The Unlympics Organizing Committee organized a series of Chicago events over four Saturdays in the winter of 2009.

Arguably the leading organizing group against the bid was No Games Chicago. To coincide with an IOC visit to Chicago in April 2009, No Games Chicago organized a rally in Federal Plaza where hundreds voiced their opposition to the bid. No Games Chicago participants dogged bid officials during a series of town halls held in each of Chicago's fifty wards two months before the IOC vote. No Games Chicago also assembled a book of evidence which was delivered to IOC headquarters in Lausanne, Switzerland, and reinforced in Copenhagen for the IOC decision.

== Outcome ==
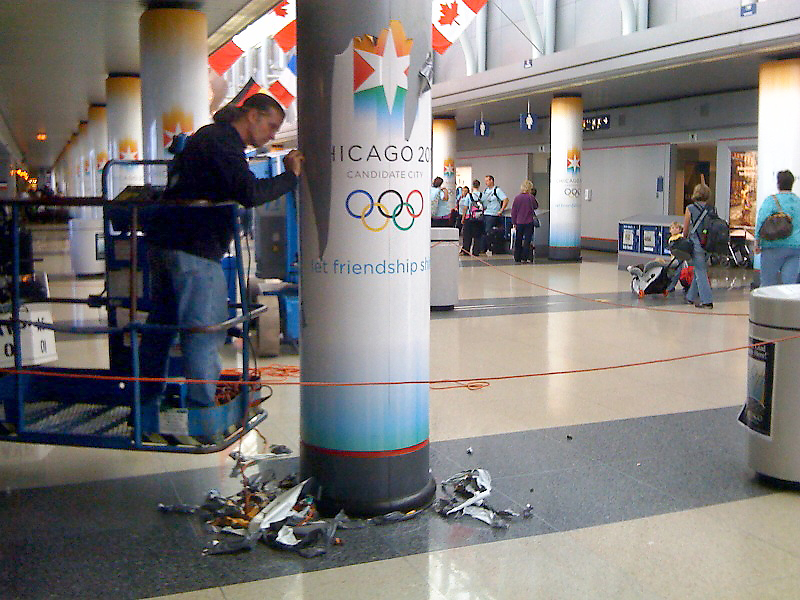
Removing of 2016 Chicago banners at O'Hare

=== Outlook ===
Chicago made the Candidate city shortlist in June 2008 as one of four finalists to host the 2016 Summer Olympics. Its technical ranking by the IOC was 7.0; generally beyond the 6.0 minimum threshold, but trailing behind Tokyo and Madrid's bids. (Technical qualities are only part of the final selection process.) The final selection from Madrid, Spain; Rio de Janeiro, Brazil was made on October 2, 2009, in Copenhagen, Denmark.

In 2007, USOC head Peter Ueberroth contended that Chicago was in "third or fourth place", with a need to focus more on the international relations rather than just having a stronger technical bid. In September 2009, the IOC gave a written evaluation of the venues, budgets, transportation plans and public support. Chicago's bid was not federally underwritten, unlike other bid cities, which concerned the IOC, given declining tax revenue during a major recession in the US economy. Nevertheless, with Chicago's strong hosting of the AIBA Boxing Championships which exposed the city to many IOC members, the city was cited as a current favorite, and one member claimed the Games were "theirs to lose." Chicago also successfully hosted the 2006 Gay Games, another multinational sporting event. Both events were planned with short lead times.

In April 2009, the Chicago 2016 bid committee was the first of the four finalists to host the 13-member IOC Evaluation Commission. They presented twenty films to the committee. Among the video spokespersons were Hillary Clinton (raised in suburban Chicago) and Michael Jordan. In addition to meeting with bid organizers, the IOC commission met with bid opposition groups when they visited. After the IOC commission left Chicago, the Chicago City Council approved an Olympic Community Agreement ordinance that was drafted by Alderman Toni Preckwinkle. The agreement committed 30 percent of Olympic Village units to affordable housing conversion and guarantees women and minorities a portion of Olympic-related contracts. Former Illinois Senate President Emil Jones derided the agreement as an inadequate deal. Some Chicago residents opposed to the Chicago bid, particularly because of the financial implications of the undertaking to Chicago residents, launched a website called "chicagoansforrio.com" to persuade the IOC to give the Olympics to Rio instead. In a public poll, Chicago residents were almost evenly divided on the bid, with 47% supporting and 45% not supporting.

=== IOC vote ===
On October 2, 2009, Chicago was knocked out in the first round of voting, and the Olympics went to Rio de Janeiro, despite some high-profile backers, such as US President Barack Obama and Chicago-based television hostess Oprah Winfrey, going to Copenhagen to support the bid. Seven years later, the 2016 state-funded Olympics in Rio proved to be a financial disaster, and many argued that privately funded games in Chicago, where most of the venues were existing or temporary ones, would have fared far better.

Since balloting is secret and IOC members rarely share their voting tendencies, there has been much speculation as to why Chicago lost the Olympic bid so early in the process. Michelle Higgins on The New York Times blog argued that an overly restrictive passport and visa policy was one such reason. CBS 2 Chicago's website suggested that anti-Americanism may have contributed. Bid CEO Patrick Ryan was quoted in the Chicago Sun-Times as saying "bloc voting" and assumptions by others in the IOC that Chicago had enough votes to make it to the second round of voting led to its early demise. The same article hinted at fractious relations, noted by The Seattle Times, between the IOC and USOC.

=== Aftermath ===
Following Chicago's loss, the USOC declined to bid for the 2020 Summer Olympics, which was ultimately awarded to Tokyo. The USOC later entered the race for the 2024 Summer Olympics with Boston but withdrew their bid. The USOC quickly selected Los Angeles to be the American candidate for the 2024 Olympics. After the IOC decided to award the hosts of both the 2024 and 2028 Olympics in 2017, Los Angeles declared their candidature for 2028, securing the 2024 Olympics for Paris with Los Angeles securing the 2028 edition.

== See also ==
- United States bids for the Olympic Games
