= Rio de Janeiro bid for the 2016 Summer Olympics =

Bid for the 2016 Summer Olympics

Bids for the 2016 Summer Olympics and Paralympics
Overview
- Games of the XXXI Olympiad; XV Paralympic Games

- Winner: Rio de Janeiro; Runner-up: Madrid; Shortlist: Tokyo · Chicago

Details
- City: Rio de Janeiro, Brazil
- Chair: Carlos Arthur Nuzman
- NOC: Brazilian Olympic Committee

Evaluation
- IOC score: 6.4

Previous Games hosted
- None • Bid for 1936, 2004 and 2012

Decision
- Result: Winner (66 votes)

The Brazilian city of Rio de Janeiro mounted a successful bid to host the 2016 Summer Olympics and 2016 Summer Paralympics. It was submitted on September 7, 2007, and recognized as an Applicant city by the International Olympic Committee (IOC) one week after. On June 4, 2008, the IOC Executive Board shortlisted Rio de Janeiro with three of the six other Applicant cities—Chicago, Madrid and Tokyo; over Baku, Doha and Prague—becoming a Candidate city during the 2008 SportAccord Convention in Athens, Greece.

Rio de Janeiro was shortlisted receiving a 6.4 score, according to a study of its Application File delivered to the IOC Working Group on January 14, 2008. As a Candidate city, Rio de Janeiro submitted its Candidature File to the IOC on February 11, 2009. The dossier was analyzed by the IOC Evaluation Commission, which arrived in the city on April 27, 2009, to assess the quality of the bid. Between April 29 and May 2, the Commission attended technical presentations and made inspections in all the existing venues across the city, giving a favorable assessment in its final report.

The Brazilian Olympic Committee (COB) chose Rio de Janeiro as its bidding city to host the 2016 Summer Olympics and Paralympics, during its Annual Assembly on September 1, 2006. This was the city's first bid that proceeded to the Candidature phase, after three failed attempts to host the Games in 1936, 2004 and 2012. The lengthy and intensive bidding process was concluded with the election of Rio de Janeiro as the host city during the 121st IOC Session, held in Copenhagen, Denmark, on October 2, 2009. It is the first city in South America to host the Games.

Rio de Janeiro planned to organize the Games at a cost of US$14.4 billion, being able to hold all sport events (excepting football) inside the city. There will be 30 competition venues in four Olympic zones—Barra, Copacabana, Deodoro, and Maracanã—apart from venues for golf and rugby union, which were added to the Olympic program after the election. Football matches were held in the cities of Belo Horizonte, Brasília, Salvador and São Paulo. The proposed dates ranged from August 5 to 21 for the Olympic Games, and September 7 to 18 for the Paralympic Games.

== Bid process ==
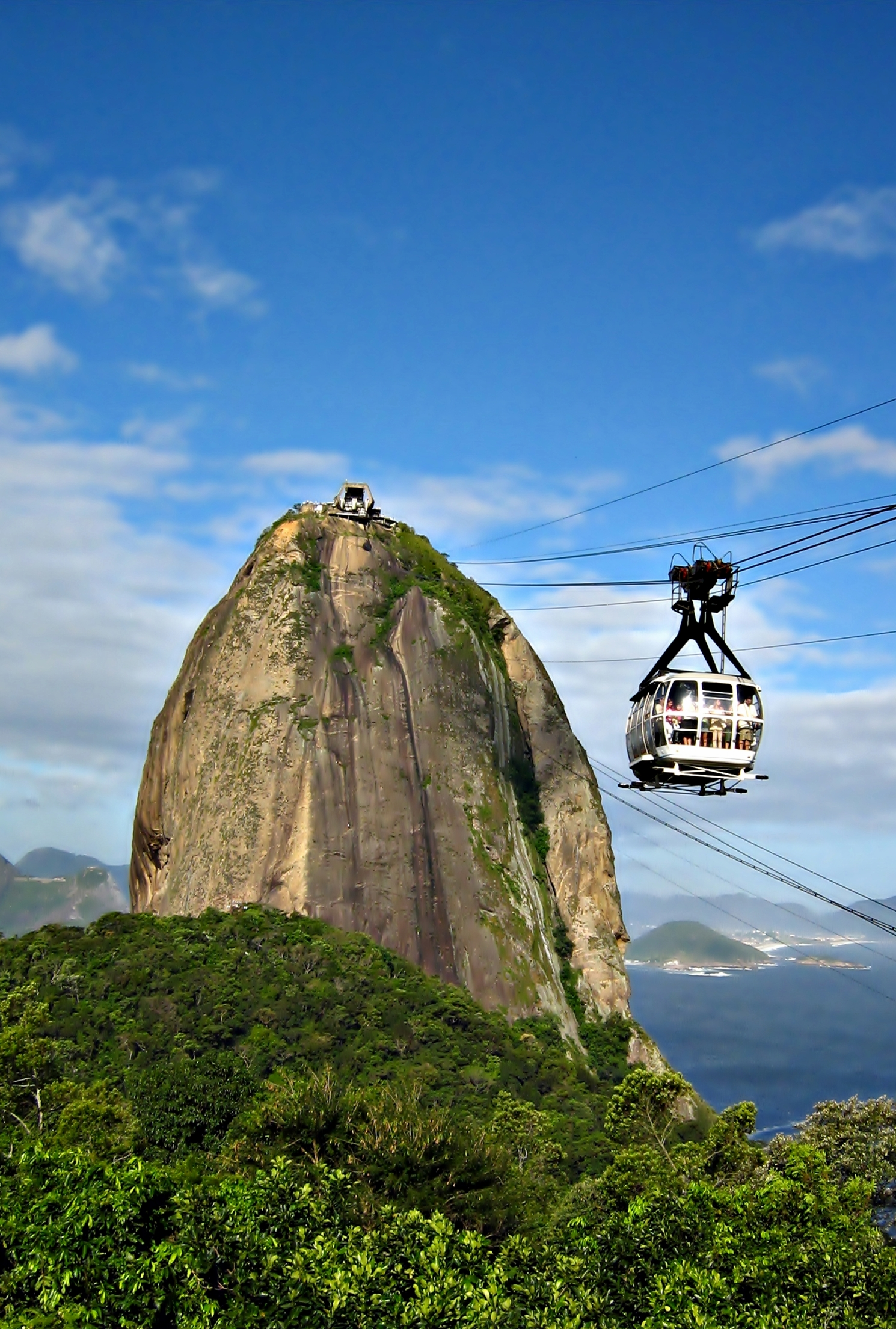
Sugarloaf Mountain at Guanabara Bay, chosen to be the symbol of the campaign. It subsequently appeared stylized in the bid logo.

Rio de Janeiro's bidding process began on July 28, 2006, when the Executive Council of the Brazilian Olympic Committee (COB in the Portuguese acronym) met to consider the possibility of nominating a Brazilian city to host the 2016 Summer Olympics and Paralympics. This meeting was prompted by the fact that several cities in the world demonstrated interest around the election, some having already announced their bidding intention. Then a technical analysis was commissioned by COB to evaluate the conditions of the city, unveiled on August 25, 2006. A week later, on September 1, 2006, the COB's Annual Assembly decided by acclamation that Rio de Janeiro would be the Brazilian representative seeking to host the Olympic and Paralympic Games in 2016. The Assembly felt it was the only city in Brazil and South America which would possess Olympic-level facilities ready for an Olympic and Paralympic bid, a legacy of its upcoming hosting of the XV Pan American Games in 2007, later considered to be the best in history. Another positive aspect was that Rio de Janeiro could host all Olympic sports within the city limits, although the Olympic football tournament is hosted by multiple cities. The Brazilian government immediately expressed its support to the bid. Carlos Arthur Nuzman, president of COB, and César Maia, then Mayor of Rio de Janeiro, approved the decision, thus making the bid official.

The International Olympic Committee (IOC) officially launched the bid process for the 2016 Summer Olympics and Paralympics on May 16, 2007. All then 203 National Olympic Committees (NOCs) were invited to submit the name of a city within their jurisdiction until September 13, 2007. On September 14, the IOC recognized seven cities—Baku, Chicago, Doha, Madrid, Prague, Rio de Janeiro and Tokyo—which had been put forward by their respective NOCs to bid. On October 1, 2007, the Rio de Janeiro bid committee paid the required fee of US$150,000 to the IOC and signed the Candidature Acceptance Procedure. Soon after, from October 15 to 19, Rio officials attended the 2016 Applicant cities' Seminar organized by the IOC at the Olympic Museum in Lausanne, Switzerland, where they learnt more about technical areas that would be analyzed throughout the application process. On January 14, 2008, the seven Applicant cities returned documents, known as the Application Files, containing the answers and guarantees requested by the 2016 Candidature Acceptance Procedure, which provided to the IOC an overview of each city's project. The responses were studied by the IOC Working Group for months and served as the basis to the shortlist of Chicago, Tokyo, Rio de Janeiro and Madrid on June 4, 2008, becoming Candidate cities during a meeting of the IOC Executive Board at the 2008 SportAccord Convention in Athens, Greece.

Rio de Janeiro bid to host the 1936, 2004 and the 2012 Games, but failed on every occasion; missing the shortlist in the two latest attempts, while the bidding process for 1936 did not follow the current standards. For the first time in the Candidature phase, the official bid flag was raised during a ceremony held at the Palácio da Cidade (English: City's Palace) on June 23, 2008, celebrating the Olympic Day. On July 3, 2008, the Rio de Janeiro bid committee paid a fee of US$500,000 to the IOC and signed the Candidature Procedure, reconfirming its acceptance of the rules. Then, Rio officials participated in the Olympic Games Observers Program from August 8 to 24, during the 2008 Summer Olympics in Beijing, China; and attended the IOC Official Debriefing of the Beijing Games from November 24 to 27, in London, United Kingdom. On February 11, 2009, the Rio de Janeiro bid committee delivered its Candidature File to the IOC in Lausanne and, eight days later, to the International Paralympic Committee (IPC) in Bonn, Germany; containing the responses to the 2016 Candidature Procedure and Questionnaire, as well as guarantees and undertakings. The Candidature File had three volumes containing 568 pages of detailed answers to 300 technical questions, divided into 17 themes. Finally, on June 17, 2009, the IOC organized the 2016 Candidate Cities Briefing to 93 of its members at the Olympic Museum, being the first such meeting in its history and the most important before the election. Rio officials came out stronger after a presentation of 45 minutes, considered to be exceptional, followed by a session of 16 questions.

Throughout the campaign, the Rio de Janeiro bid committee introduced its plans to the General Assemblies of all Associations of National Olympic Committees (ANOC), making the bid's first official presentation on October 11, 2008, to the Pan American Sports Organization (PASO), in Acapulco, Mexico. On October 21, the vision was presented to the Olympic Council of Asia (OCA) in Bali, Indonesia, followed by the European Olympic Committees (EOC) on November 21, in Istanbul, Turkey. On March 26, 2009, Rio officials made a praised presentation during the 2009 SportAccord Convention in Denver, United States. For the first time, a world map of the past Olympic host cities was displayed, subsequently becoming an icon of Rio's campaign due to the void in South America. On March 31, 2009, the Rio de Janeiro bid committee made its plea to the Oceania National Olympic Committees (ONOC) in Queenstown, New Zealand; and on July 7, to the Association of National Olympic Committees of Africa (ANOCA) in Abuja, Nigeria. The bid committee also attended many sporting events, such as the Australian and European Youth Olympic Festivals, the Commonwealth Youth Games, the Asian Youth Games and the Mediterranean Games, as well as the Aquatics, Athletics, Rowing and Judo World Championships. The three-year campaign culminated with the beginning of the 13th Olympic Congress in Copenhagen, Denmark, which was officially opened in a ceremony held at the city's Opera House, and after a lunch offered by Margrethe II, Queen of Denmark, to the heads of state of the four Candidate cities at the Amalienborg Palace.

=== Evaluation ===
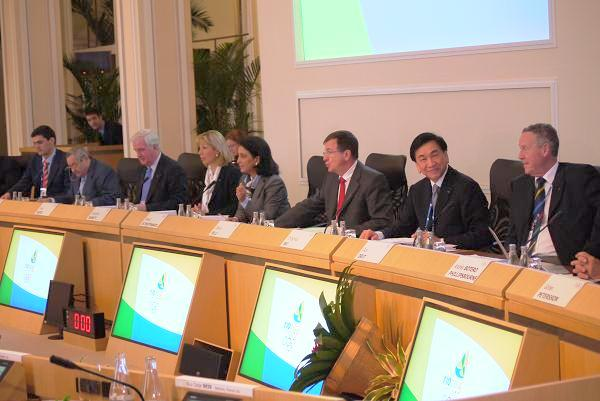
IOC Evaluation Commission attending presentations at Copacabana Palace.

Rio de Janeiro was primarily evaluated during the Applicant phase, accurately on March 14, 2008, when the IOC Working Group released its report after four days of meetings, giving a weighted-average score of 6.4 to the bid. It was based on a thorough technical analysis of the projects presented on the Application File, which was developed by the Rio de Janeiro bid committee after having access to the Olympic Games Knowledge Management database as well as the official IOC Technical Manuals. The Working Group composed of several experts assessed the city's potential for staging successful Olympic Games according to eleven criteria presented in the Application File. Rio de Janeiro's highest score came from Government support, legal issues and public opinion due to the strong government commitment, and its lowest from Safety and security due to the city's chronic problems of violence. Experience in major events also yielded good scores, while a shortage in the number of required hotel rooms undermined the accommodation theme. The Working Group also gave an 8.3 score to Tokyo, 8.1 to Madrid, 7.0 to Chicago, 6.9 to Doha, 5.3 to Prague and 4.3 to Baku; being the basis for the selection to the Candidature phase. On September 18, 2008, after the shortlist which concluded the Application phase, the IOC announced the composition of its Evaluation Commission. The commission inspected the four Candidate cities under the leadership of Nawal El Moutawakel, who also chaired the Evaluation Commission for the bid process of the 2012 Summer Olympics and Paralympics.

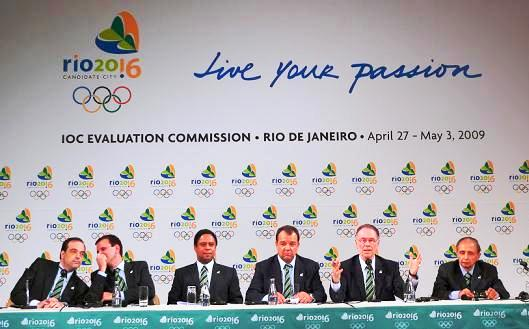
The bid committee, led by Carlos Arthur Nuzman, giving a press conference.

The IOC Evaluation Commission arrived in Rio de Janeiro on April 27, 2009, to assess the quality of the bid, stating that the welcoming activities prepared by the city had been the best. Unlike the first evaluation, the committee did not assign scores, but analyzed the probability of execution of the plans. During the first two days of the visit, the Evaluation Commission held internal meetings at Copacabana Palace, the host hotel. Between April 29 and 30, the Commission attended technical presentations in a large ballroom equipped with lighting and multi-media resources, where it participated in question-and-answer sessions about each of the seventeen themes presented in the Candidature File. May Day was marked by the inspectors' visits to all existing venues across the city. On May 2, 2009, the Evaluation Commission made a press conference to highlight the main points of the visit. According to El Moutawakel, the Commission was very impressed with the unity of government support, the quality of the presentations and the level of integration of the Games in the country's long-term development plan. After seven days of inspections involving 300 professionals, the thirteen members of the IOC Evaluation Commission left Rio de Janeiro on May 3, 2009, on the way to Madrid. One month before the election, on September 2, 2009, Rio officials welcomed the released of the 2016 Evaluation Commission Report. It gave a very positive assessment to the city and described the documents submitted by Rio de Janeiro as "of a very high quality".

Table of scores given by the IOC Working Group to assess the quality and feasibility of Rio de Janeiro's bid
Criteria		Weight	Grade^{[α]}			Feasibility	
Criteria		Weight	Min	Max	Planned	Min	Max
Accommodation		5	5.5	6.4	3–5 star rooms	0.7	0.9
Accommodation concept (20%)		5	5.0	7.0	Media villages	0.7	0.8
Number of rooms (80%)		5			Other rooms	0.6	0.9
Environmental conditions and impact		2	5.6	7.6		0.80	
Current environmental conditions (40%)		2	5.0	7.0		0.85	
Environmental impact (60%)		2	6.0	8.0		0.85	
Experience from past sports events		2	6.6	7.9			
Number of major international events organized (60%)		2	7.0	8.5	Categories^{[β]}		
Quality of the events (40%)		2	6.0	7.0	Commercial revenue		
Finance		3	6.0	7.7	Commercial revenue projection of USD 750 million considered feasible. Brazil listed at A4 by COFACE Country Risk Rating out of seven risk levels (A1, A2, A3, A4, B, C and D, in order of increasing risk).		
General infrastructure		5	5.3	7.2	Commercial revenue projection of USD 750 million considered feasible. Brazil listed at A4 by COFACE Country Risk Rating out of seven risk levels (A1, A2, A3, A4, B, C and D, in order of increasing risk).		
Airport (5%)		5	5.0	7.5	Commercial revenue projection of USD 750 million considered feasible. Brazil listed at A4 by COFACE Country Risk Rating out of seven risk levels (A1, A2, A3, A4, B, C and D, in order of increasing risk).		
International Broadcast Center–Main Press Center (15%)		5	6.0	8.0	Commercial revenue projection of USD 750 million considered feasible. Brazil listed at A4 by COFACE Country Risk Rating out of seven risk levels (A1, A2, A3, A4, B, C and D, in order of increasing risk).		
Transport infrastructure (85%)	Existing	5	5.0	7.0	Telecommunications		
Transport infrastructure (85%)	Planned and additional	5	7.0	9.0	Brazil appear to offer a satisfactory level of development with modernisation plans underway that would support the 2016 Summer Olympics and Paralympics, according to an IDATE Report.		
Government support, legal issues and public opinion		3	7.3	8.8	Brazil appear to offer a satisfactory level of development with modernisation plans underway that would support the 2016 Summer Olympics and Paralympics, according to an IDATE Report.		
Government support & commitment (70%)		3	7.0	9.0	Brazil appear to offer a satisfactory level of development with modernisation plans underway that would support the 2016 Summer Olympics and Paralympics, according to an IDATE Report.		
Olympic Charter, legal aspects and anti-doping measures (15%)		3	8.0	9.0	Brazil appear to offer a satisfactory level of development with modernisation plans underway that would support the 2016 Summer Olympics and Paralympics, according to an IDATE Report.		
Public opinion (15%)		3	7.7				
Olympic Village		3	6.0	7.7	Glossary		
Concept (40%)		3	6.0	8.0	Grade: Value (on a scale of 0 to 10) attributed by the IOC Working Group to the main and sub-criteria, using the format of an interval comprising a minimum and maximum grade.; Feasibility: Probability of a project being achieved in the proposed timeframe. A factor (value of 0.1 to 1.0) applicable to the grades can penalise the project to which it is attributed.; Weight: Importance given by the IOC Working Group to a main or sub-criterion in relation to other criteria or sub-criteria.		
Legacy (20%)		3	8.0	9.0	Grade: Value (on a scale of 0 to 10) attributed by the IOC Working Group to the main and sub-criteria, using the format of an interval comprising a minimum and maximum grade.; Feasibility: Probability of a project being achieved in the proposed timeframe. A factor (value of 0.1 to 1.0) applicable to the grades can penalise the project to which it is attributed.; Weight: Importance given by the IOC Working Group to a main or sub-criterion in relation to other criteria or sub-criteria.		
Location (40%)		3	6.0	8.0	Grade: Value (on a scale of 0 to 10) attributed by the IOC Working Group to the main and sub-criteria, using the format of an interval comprising a minimum and maximum grade.; Feasibility: Probability of a project being achieved in the proposed timeframe. A factor (value of 0.1 to 1.0) applicable to the grades can penalise the project to which it is attributed.; Weight: Importance given by the IOC Working Group to a main or sub-criterion in relation to other criteria or sub-criteria.		
Overall project and legacy		3	5.5	8.0	Grade: Value (on a scale of 0 to 10) attributed by the IOC Working Group to the main and sub-criteria, using the format of an interval comprising a minimum and maximum grade.; Feasibility: Probability of a project being achieved in the proposed timeframe. A factor (value of 0.1 to 1.0) applicable to the grades can penalise the project to which it is attributed.; Weight: Importance given by the IOC Working Group to a main or sub-criterion in relation to other criteria or sub-criteria.		
Safety and security		3	4.5	7.0	Grade: Value (on a scale of 0 to 10) attributed by the IOC Working Group to the main and sub-criteria, using the format of an interval comprising a minimum and maximum grade.; Feasibility: Probability of a project being achieved in the proposed timeframe. A factor (value of 0.1 to 1.0) applicable to the grades can penalise the project to which it is attributed.; Weight: Importance given by the IOC Working Group to a main or sub-criterion in relation to other criteria or sub-criteria.		
Sports venues		4	5.8	7.4	Grade: Value (on a scale of 0 to 10) attributed by the IOC Working Group to the main and sub-criteria, using the format of an interval comprising a minimum and maximum grade.; Feasibility: Probability of a project being achieved in the proposed timeframe. A factor (value of 0.1 to 1.0) applicable to the grades can penalise the project to which it is attributed.; Weight: Importance given by the IOC Working Group to a main or sub-criterion in relation to other criteria or sub-criteria.		
Existing venues (35%)		4	5.0	7.0	Grade: Value (on a scale of 0 to 10) attributed by the IOC Working Group to the main and sub-criteria, using the format of an interval comprising a minimum and maximum grade.; Feasibility: Probability of a project being achieved in the proposed timeframe. A factor (value of 0.1 to 1.0) applicable to the grades can penalise the project to which it is attributed.; Weight: Importance given by the IOC Working Group to a main or sub-criterion in relation to other criteria or sub-criteria.		
Olympic Games sports concept & legacy (30%)		4	6.0	8.0	Grade: Value (on a scale of 0 to 10) attributed by the IOC Working Group to the main and sub-criteria, using the format of an interval comprising a minimum and maximum grade.; Feasibility: Probability of a project being achieved in the proposed timeframe. A factor (value of 0.1 to 1.0) applicable to the grades can penalise the project to which it is attributed.; Weight: Importance given by the IOC Working Group to a main or sub-criterion in relation to other criteria or sub-criteria.		
Planned and additional venues (35%)		4	6.5	8.0	Notes		
Transport concept		3	5.5	7.5	^{α} The IOC Working Group set the benchmark at 6 as the minimum required grade.^{β} The IOC Working Group commissioned reports about the presented categories instead of attributing grades based on the Applicant File.		
Distances and travel times (50%)		3	5.0	7.0	^{α} The IOC Working Group set the benchmark at 6 as the minimum required grade.^{β} The IOC Working Group commissioned reports about the presented categories instead of attributing grades based on the Applicant File.		
Transport organisation and traffic management at Games-time (50%)		3	6.0	8.0	^{α} The IOC Working Group set the benchmark at 6 as the minimum required grade.^{β} The IOC Working Group commissioned reports about the presented categories instead of attributing grades based on the Applicant File.		
Total average			6.4		^{α} The IOC Working Group set the benchmark at 6 as the minimum required grade.^{β} The IOC Working Group commissioned reports about the presented categories instead of attributing grades based on the Applicant File.		

=== Election ===
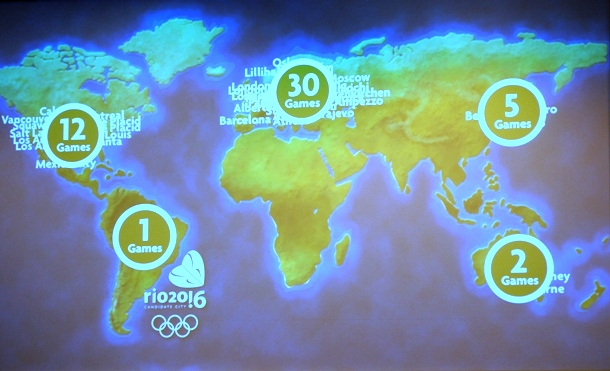
After victory version of the presentations map of Olympic host cities.

The election of the host city took place at Bella Center on October 2, 2009, in Copenhagen, during the 121st IOC Session. Rio de Janeiro was the third city to present plans to the IOC members, entering the Hall A of Bella Center at 12:05 (CEST) with a delegation of 60 people, among bid leaders, government authorities and athletes. João Havelange made the opening speech and invited everyone to celebrate his centenary in Rio de Janeiro in 2016. Carlos Arthur Nuzman was the next speaker, talking about experiences of the Olympic movement, and who introduced the iconic map of past Olympic host cities. Governor Sérgio Cabral Filho then spoke about projects related to security and transportation, followed by Henrique Meirelles, who explained the economic situation of Brazil. Mayor Eduardo Paes was responsible for presenting the venues plan alongside Carlos Roberto Osório, while they were complemented by Olympic sailor Isabel Swan, who stated that the project had been made thinking on athletes. Swan cited the other athletes present in the plenary: former football player Pelé, Paralympic swimmer Daniel Dias and junior athlete Bárbara Leôncio. After that, President Luiz Inácio Lula da Silva made a plea to bring the Games for the first time to South America, saying that was "time to light the Olympic cauldron in a tropical country". Nuzman returned and concluded the presentation, which included a short film (called Unity^{A}) by Academy Award nominated director Fernando Meirelles, and a music video (called Celebration^{B}) with an English version of "Aquele Abraço" by Gilberto Gil.

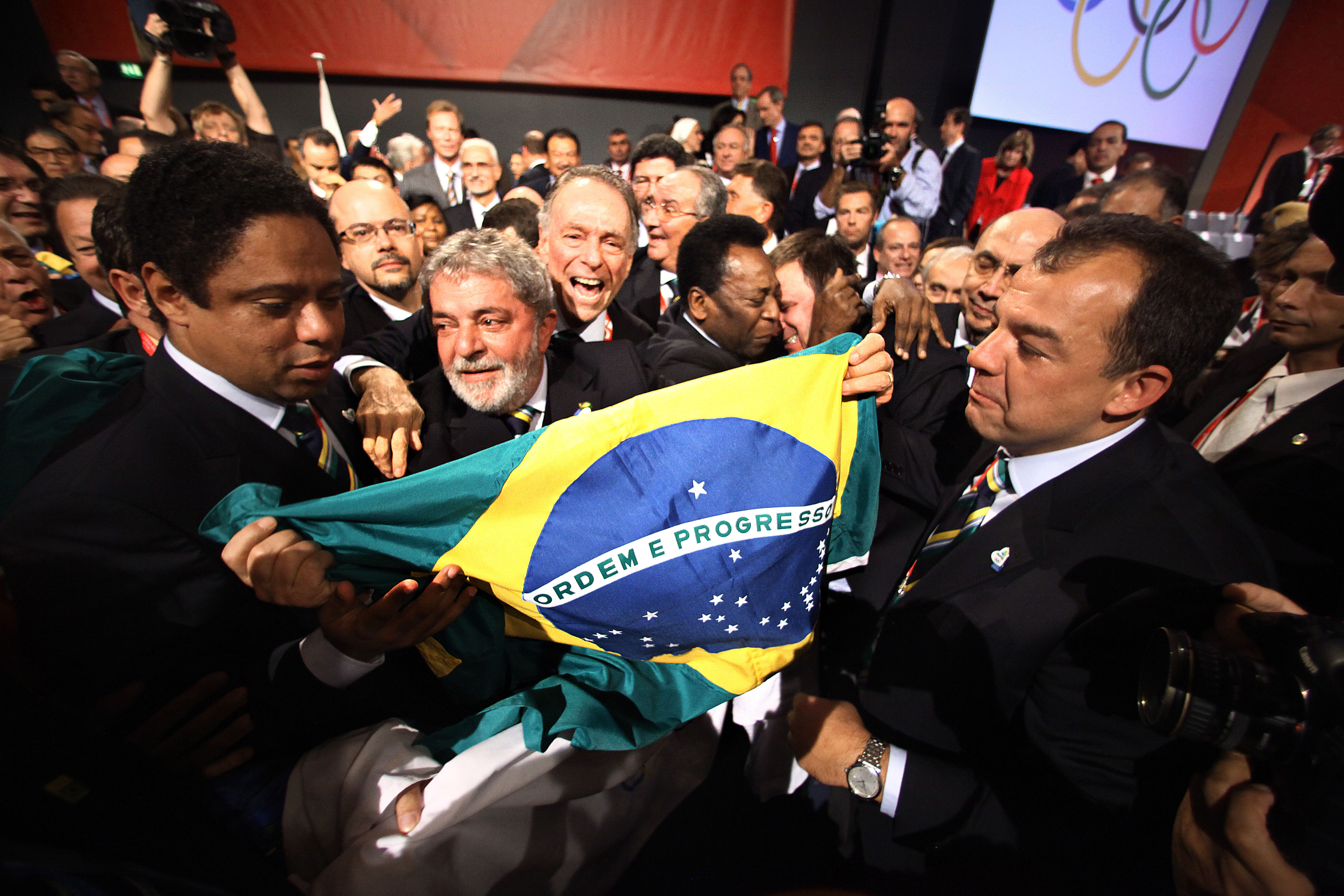
Celebration after the city's victory during the 121st IOC Session at Bella Center.

After the presentation, the session was opened for questions. Nuzman clarified doubts by Arne Ljungqvist about doping legislation; Osório and Cabral answered two questions by Prince Albert of Monaco about accommodation and the project's legacy, respectively; and the President of Brazil himself responded to a question by Austin Sealy about organization risks. Following the presentations by the four Candidate cities, Nawal El Moutawakel presented the report of the Evaluation Commission to the Session. From a total of 106 eligible IOC members, 95 were available to vote in the first round. Members from the four bidding countries were not allowed to vote until their city was eliminated. Alpha Ibrahim Diallo, Kun Hee Lee, Saku Koivu and the IOC president were eligible members who did not vote. Chicago fell in the first round with 18 votes, while Tokyo received 22, Rio 26, and Madrid 28. In the second round, Tokyo was eliminated with 20 votes, while Madrid received 29 and Rio 46. Rio de Janeiro was elected in the final round with 66 votes over 32 for Madrid. The winning city was revealed by Jacques Rogge at 6:30 (CEST) during an announcement ceremony hosted by Lillian Gjerulf Kretz and Jonathan Edwards. Nearly 100,000 people celebrated the victory on Copacabana beach while watching the live broadcast. Following the announcement, Richard Carrión, Rogge, Nuzman and Paes signed the Host City Contract and officialized Rio de Janeiro as the host of the 2016 Olympic and Paralympic Games.

== Bid concept ==
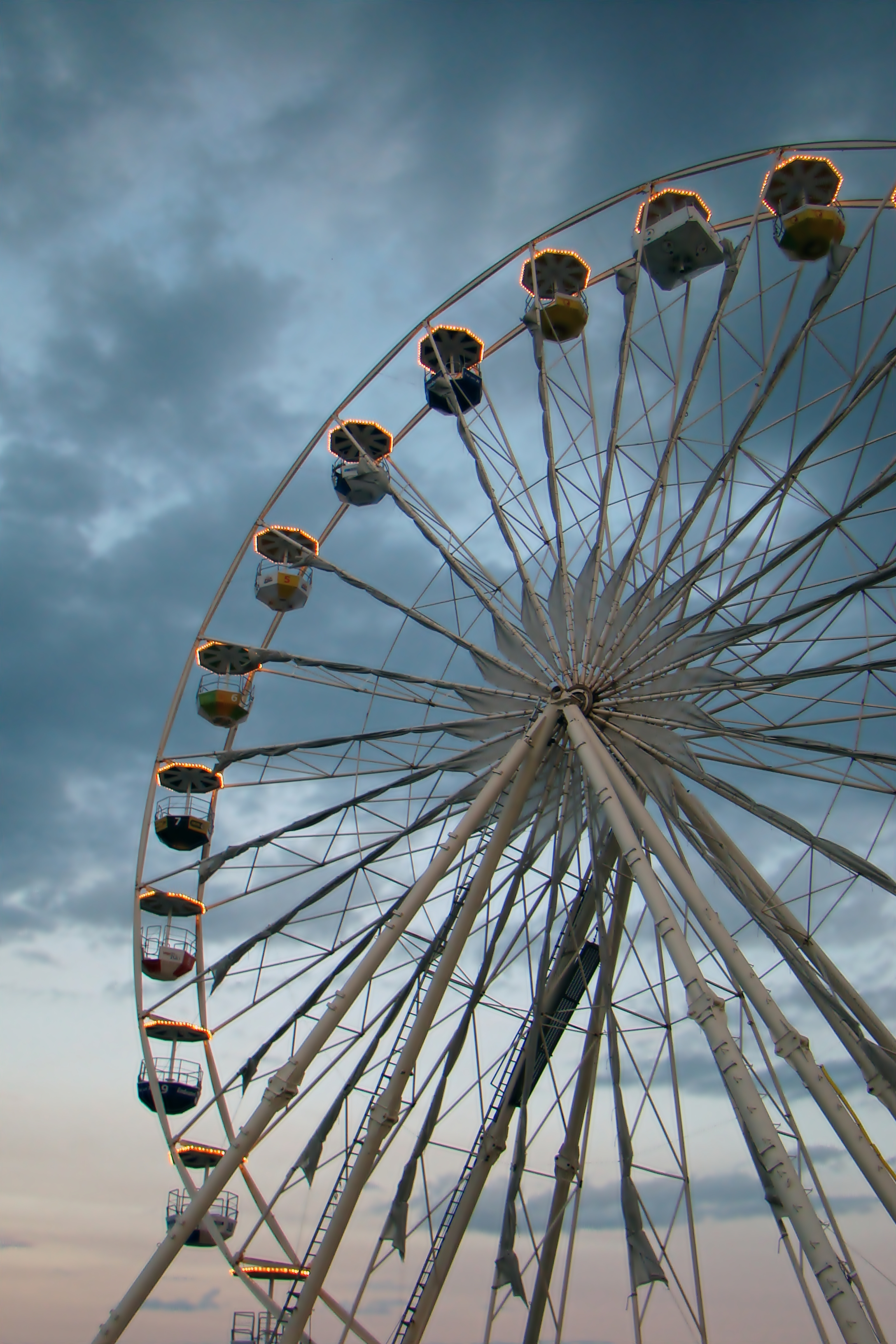
Rio de Janeiro 2016-themed Ferris wheel on Copacabana beach, built to promote the campaigning. Images were projected on it while operating.

According to the Rio de Janeiro bid committee, the bid's concept was based on four principles—technical excellence, experience of a lifetime, transformation, and supporting the Olympic and Paralympic Movements—highlighting the city's celebration lifestyle, as seen on its promotional video (called Passion^{C}). The 2016 Summer Olympics and Paralympics will embed the Games in society as a catalyst for social integration, through programs for job generation, education, community outreach, volunteerism, training and up-skilling initiatives. The campaign also focused on youth and the fact that South America never hosted the Olympic Games, considering it to be a "self affirmation" of the Brazilian people. Rio de Janeiro integrated economic, environmental and social elements into its "Green Games for a Blue Planet" vision and planted 2386 seedlings to offset 716 tons of carbon emitted over the two years of campaign. Athletes and spectators will enjoy good climatic conditions in Rio de Janeiro, where mild southern hemisphere winter with absence of heavy rainfall provides favorable atmosphere for athletic performance. Average midday temperature of 24.2 °C (75.6 °F) is predicted during the proposed dates for the Games, with temperatures ranging from 18.9 °C (66.0 °F) to 28.1 °C (82.6 °F) and humidity levels of 66.4%.

The visual identity of the candidature consisted of a logo and a slogan, which were applied in marketing moves during the campaign. Designed by Ana Soter and selected among four finalists by a special jury, the logo was unveiled during the 2007 Brazilian Olympic Awards, held at the Municipal Theater of Rio de Janeiro, on December 17, 2007. The Sugarloaf Mountain was chosen to be the symbol as one of the city's most famous landmarks. According to the Rio de Janeiro bid committee, the design as a whole conveys a heart shape, representing Brazilian passion and enthusiasm for sports. First with only the inscription "Applicant city", the logo received the Olympic rings and the label "Candidate city" after being shortlisted. At midnight on January 1, 2009, the bid's slogan "Live your passion" was launched as part of the New Year's celebrations, which was attended by nearly two million people. According to the Rio de Janeiro bid committee, the slogan reflected the Brazilian's way of getting passionately involved in whatever they do. It was projected onto the Rio de Janeiro 2016-themed Ferris wheel after the countdown to the beginning of 2009. The structure erected on Copacabana beach to promote the candidature was 36 m (118 ft 1 in) high, weighed 80 tonnes (180,000 lb) and had 24 gondolas for 144 people.

Rio de Janeiro previously hosted major sporting, business and cultural events. On the sporting front, these events included World Cups and World Championships in many Olympic sports, as well as regional championships. From July 13 to July 29, 2007, the city successfully staged the 15th and largest ever edition of the Pan American Games (over 5,650 athletes competing in 34 sports) and the accompanying Parapan American Games (over 1,150 athletes competing in 10 sports). Rio de Janeiro hosted the 1950 FIFA World Cup and recently hosted the 2014 FIFA World Cup, just two years before the 2016 Olympic and Paralympic Games, which includes upgrades to security, telecommunications and tourism infrastructure. The 2013 FIFA Confederations Cup will also be organised by Brazil and used as a test event for the 2014 FIFA World Cup. The proposed competition schedule spreads medals across the entire program with two peaks at the weekends, being similar to the 2008 Summer Olympics program. The period proposed by the Rio de Janeiro bid committee to stage the 2016 Summer Olympics is from Friday, August 5, to Sunday, August 21, 2016. It is also proposed that the 2016 Summer Paralympics begin on the Independence Day of Brazil, Wednesday, September 7, and last until Sunday, September 18.

=== Politics ===
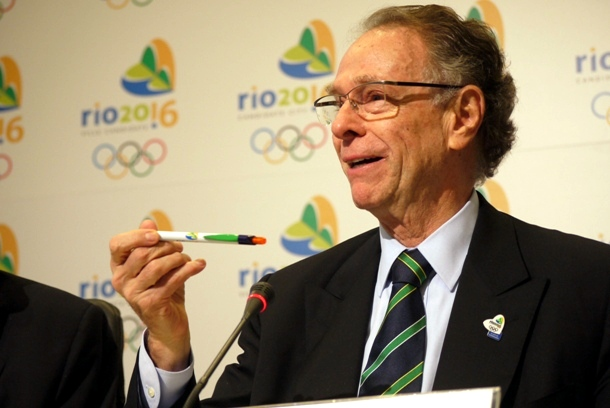
Carlos Arthur Nuzman, chair of the Rio de Janeiro bid committee.

The Rio de Janeiro bid committee was an incorporated non-profit entity under the leadership of an Honorary Council and an Executive Board, both chaired by Carlos Arthur Nuzman. At the highest level, the Honorary Council comprised the President of the Federative Republic of Brazil Luiz Inácio Lula da Silva, the Governor of the State of Rio de Janeiro Sérgio Cabral Filho, the Mayor of the Municipality of Rio de Janeiro Eduardo Paes, and the two Brazilian IOC members: Nuzman and João Havelange. At the executive level, the Executive Board was divided in four departments—Government Coordination Commission, Business Council, Legacy Committee and Athletes' Commission—being responsible for the main operations of the campaign. The Board also included representations from the three levels of Government with the specific authority to make commitments on behalf of their respective Governments. Technical aspects of the bid were supported by various Councils and Committees composed of a professionals staff, and supplemented by a team of domestic and international experts; which were coordinated by Carlos Roberto Osório, Secretary General of the bid committee. Mike Lee, former Director of Communications and Public Affairs for the London bid for the 2012 Summer Olympics, was the lead advisor to the bid of Rio de Janeiro. His company, Vero Campaigning Communications, was responsible for planning the bid's advertising campaign strategy, presentation scripts, visual support development and international media relations, as well as international press conferences.

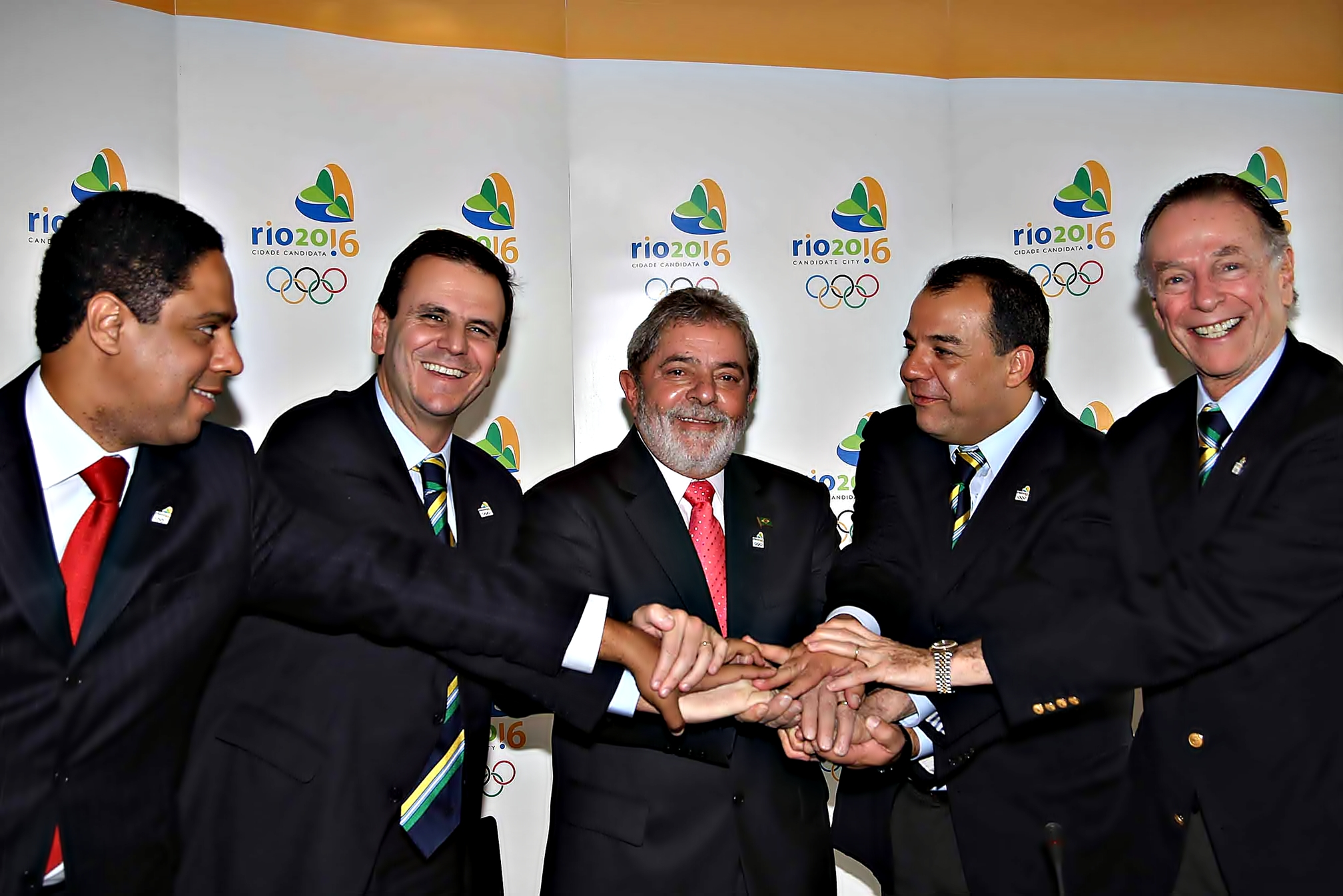
Leaders of the Brazilian government demonstrating political support to the bid.

Rio de Janeiro had full political backing from the three levels of the Government of Brazil—Federal, State and City—providing all guarantees and covenants required by the IOC, as well as some additional undertakings. All levels government, as well as all major political parties in the country, pledged complete support for the bid and endorsed the conduct of the Olympic and Paralympic Games in Brazil. On June 23, 2008, the Brazilian president formed the Government Action Management Committee, under the patronage of the Minister of Sport Orlando Silva, which coordinated Federal government actions during the bid process. Another act created the Olympic Development Authority (ODA) on January 17, 2009, to coordinate public services and infrastructure delivery for eventual Games in Rio de Janeiro, based in the pioneer model developed by Sydney for the 2000 Summer Olympics and Paralympics. Under legal aspects, the Organising Committee for the Olympic Games (OCOG) would be the entity responsible for planning and staging the 2016 Olympic and Paralympic Games. According to the IOC, the existing legislation was sufficient to enable the organization of the Games and would be amended or modified to suit the Olympic Charter if needed. The Ministry of External Relations and the Ministry of Labor guaranteed the entry, exit and working arrangements for Games personnel. People in possession of a valid passport and an Olympic or Paralympic Identity and Accreditation Card, in lieu of a visa, will be able to enter the Brazilian territory.

=== Controversies ===
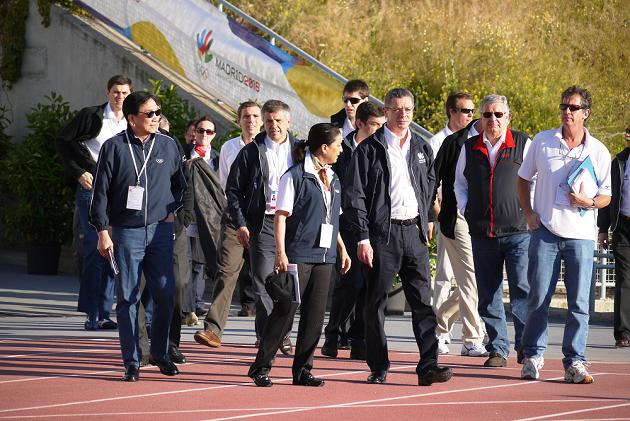
Evaluation Commission touring Madrid despite the spy scandal.

The IOC's decision to shortlist Rio de Janeiro over Doha generated criticism, as the Doha bid committee accused the IOC of "closing the door on the Arab world" and of making a political decision rather than judging on technical grounds. Doha outperformed Rio de Janeiro in the majority of the categories assessed, but according to the IOC, Doha's desire to stage the Olympics in October because of high temperatures was the reason the bid was rejected. On May 3, 2009, the Rio de Janeiro bid committee accused the Madrid bid committee of sending a spy to Rio de Janeiro during the visit of the Evaluation Commission, and considered filing a formal ethics complaint with the IOC. Simon Walsh, who claimed to be a reporter working for EFE, omitted the fact that he was a paid consultant of the Madrid bid committee and was stripped of his media accreditation. Madrid officials denied the accusations. On June 14, 2009, the American television network NBC aired the episode "The Glory That Was..." from the series Law & Order: Criminal Intent, in which a security company, interested in millionaire contracts with the possibility of hosting the 2016 Summer Olympics in Brazil, bought votes of members of the "Olympic Site Selection Committee" for Rio de Janeiro and murdered a member of the Belgian Olympic Committee. When aired by AXN in Brazil on September 3, 2009, the episode received much criticism. Eduardo Paes called the show "ridiculous and pathetic", while the Rio de Janeiro bid committee condemned the "irresponsible and reckless use" of the city's image.

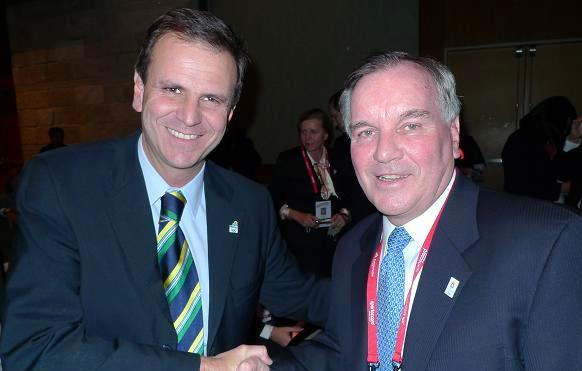
Eduardo Paes and Richard M. Daley at SportAccord, in March 2009.

Ahead of the election, the Rio de Janeiro bid committee lodged an official complaint against Madrid with the IOC Ethics Commission about comments made on September 30, 2009, by José Maria Odriozola, vice president of the Spanish Olympic Committee (SOC); and considered doing it against Chicago due to comments by Richard M. Daley, Mayor of Chicago, on September 21, 2009. Odriozola called Rio de Janeiro "the worst of the four candidates", while Rio officials believe that Daley implied that the city was incapable of hosting the Olympics when he said it was "not the same as hosting the [2014] FIFA World Cup". Mercedes Coghen apologised for Odriozola's comments on behalf of the Madrid bid committee. According to the IOC rules, rival cities are not allowed to directly criticise other bidders. After the conclusion of the bid process, Shintarō Ishihara, Governor of Tokyo, blamed "invisible dynamics" and political deals for Tokyo's failure. Rio officials repudiated "the inappropriate statements" and sent a formal notification to the IOC on October 6, 2009. On November 30, 2009, the Hollywood actor Robin Williams caused embarrassment due to humorous comments made in an interview with David Letterman. During the Late Show with David Letterman, broadcast by CBS, Williams said that Rio de Janeiro was elected as host city because it sent "50 strippers and a pound of blow" to compete with Michelle Obama and Oprah Winfrey, from Chicago. The comments were widely criticized by the Brazilian media and government authorities.

== Bid project ==
Artistic concept of the proposed rowing venue to be located at the Lagoa Rodrigo de Freitas on Copacabana zone.

Rio de Janeiro proposed to hold all sporting events within the city limits—apart from the football (soccer) tournaments which would be held in the cities of Belo Horizonte, Brasília, Salvador and São Paulo—making the Games more compact and technically feasible. The competition venues will be located in four Olympic zones—Barra, Copacabana, Deodoro, and Maracanã—and divided in seven Olympic clusters—Barra, Copacabana, Deodoro, Flamengo, João Havelange, Lagoa and Maracanã—with four Olympic precincts—Maracanã, Olympic Park, Riocentro and X Park. The Olympic and Paralympic Village, the International Broadcast Centre (IBC) and the Main Press Centre (MPC) will be located at the Barra zone, which is the core of the project and includes the largest number of competition venues. A television tower will be built at the IBC/MPC complex to complement broadcasting operations and provide panoramic studios. There will be a media-exclusive hotel within the complex, accessible directly from the IBC/MPC. The Olympic and Paralympic Village complex will include an Olympic Village Training Center, an Olympic Village Park, an Olympic Beach and direct access to the Olympic Park, in addition to the 8,856 rooms to accommodate over 17,770 athletes and team officials, including accredited additional officials.

Rio de Janeiro's competition venues meet the International Federation's (IFs) technical requirements and both IOC and IPC standards, and align with the City Master Plan and legacy strategy. Most venues are already operational, recently developed or renovated. According to the Rio de Janeiro 2016 bid committee, there are ten (29%) existing venues with no permanent works required and eight (24%) venues requiring reforms, while nine (26%) new permanent venues and seven (21%) temporary venues will be built. In total there will be 34 competition venues alongside 29 training venues, as part of the training venues strategy. The most significant legacy project from the bid is the Olympic Training Center (OTC) program and facilities with its headquarters located in Barra zone. Furthermore, the Rio de Janeiro 2016 bid committee recognized the possibility of new sports being added to the Olympic Program and, following detailed analysis for each of the seven potential sports—baseball, golf, karate, roller sports, rugby, softball and squash—confirmed its capability to accommodate any of them in respect to venues, transport and other operational or logistical aspects. In addition, Rio de Janeiro and the four proposed cities to hold football (soccer) competitions—Brasília, Belo Horizonte, Salvador and São Paulo—were chosen to host the 2014 FIFA World Cup.

Rio de Janeiro will build the Summer Paralympics, upon the experience of hosting the III Parapan American Games—considered "the best ever" by the International Paralympic Committee (IPC) and the Americas Paralympic Committee (APC)—as well as many other international competitions for athletes with disabilities. For this purpose, the organizing committee will include representatives of the Brazilian Paralympic Committee (BPC) and create a specific department responsible for supervising the Games. Another element that will bring the Paralympics up to par with their Olympic counterpart is the reuse of twenty Olympic competition venues for the equivalent Paralympic sports. Promotion of accessibility-friendly measures by the hospitality and tourism industries will also be encouraged and recognized by the government.

Venues of the Rio de Janeiro bid for the 2016 Summer Olympics
New competition venues
Venue	Sports			Capacity	Cost (USD thousand)
Youth Arena	D	Fencing, Basketball (elimination rounds)		5,000	46,096
Olympic Aquatics Stadium	D	Swimming and Waterpolo		18,000	54,564
Olympic BMX Centre	D	Cycling (BMX)		7,500	12,289
Olympic Tennis Centre	D	Tennis		18,250	62,808
Olympic Training Center – Hall 1	D	Basketball		16,000	56,768
Olympic Training Center – Hall 2	D	Judo and Taekwondo		10,000	56,998
Olympic Training Center – Hall 3	D	Wrestling		10,000	56,694
Deodoro Olympic Whitewater Stadium	D	Canoe/Kayak (slalom)		8,000	30,979
Rio Olympic Velodrome	D	Cycling (track)		5,000	39,707
Existing competition venues
Venue		Sports		Capacity	Cost (USD thousand)
João Havelange Stadium	B	Athletics (track and field)		60,000	52,478
Rodrigo de Freitas Lagoon	B	Rowing and Canoe/Kayak (sprint)		14,000	20,591
Maracanã Stadium	A	Football		90,000	5,572
Maracanãzinho Arena	A	Volleyball		12,000	2,737
Maria Lenk Aquatics Center	B	Diving, Synchronized swimming, Waterpolo		6,500	14,844
Marina da Glória	B	Sailing		10,000	22,084
National Equestrian Center	B	Equestrian		14,000	20,343
National Shooting Center	B	Shooting		6,850	7,596
Olympic Hockey Centre	B	Field hockey		15,000	12,351
Rio Olympic Arena (HSBC Arena)	A	Gymnastics		12,000	4,094
Riocentro – Pavilion 2	A	Boxing		9,000	4,848
Riocentro – Pavilion 3	A	Table tennis		7,000	6,469
Riocentro – Pavilion 4	A	Badminton		6,500	6,354
Sambódromo	B	Archery and Athletics (marathon)		36,000	22,731
Temporary competition venues
Venue		Sports		Capacity	Cost (USD thousand)
Copacabana Stadium	C	Beach volleyball		12,000	10,782
Deodoro Stadium	C	Modern pentathlon Rugby		20,000	10,362
Fort Copacabana	C	Marathon swimming, Cycling (road), Triathlon		5,000	9,735
Mountain Bike Centre	C	Cycling (mountain bike)		5,000	8,409
OTC – Future Arena	C	Handball		12,000	58,269
Pontal	C	Athletics (race walk) and Cycling (time trial)		5,000	8,827
Riocentro – Pavilion 6	C	Weightlifting		6,500	17,980
Competition venues outside Rio de Janeiro
Venue		Sports	Location	Capacity	Cost (USD thousand)
Itaipava Arena Fonte Nova	A	Football	Salvador (BA)	60,000	3,726
Estádio Nacional Mané Garrincha	A	Football	Brasília (DF)	76,000	3,726
Mineirão Stadium	A	Football	Belo Horizonte (MG)	74,000	3,726
Arena Corinthians	A	Football	São Paulo (SP)	48,000	3,726
Legend A Existing (no permanent work required). B Existing (permanent work required). C Additional temporary (Games dependent). D Planned (irrespective of the Games) and additional permanent (Games dependent). Golf and Rugby sevens returned to the Olympic program after the election of the host city, hence their venues were not specified during the candidature process. Map of Rio de Janeiro showing the venues of its bid for the 2016 Summer Olympics. Map of Brazil showing the football venues of the Rio de Janeiro bid for the 2016 Summer Olympics.

=== Infrastructure ===
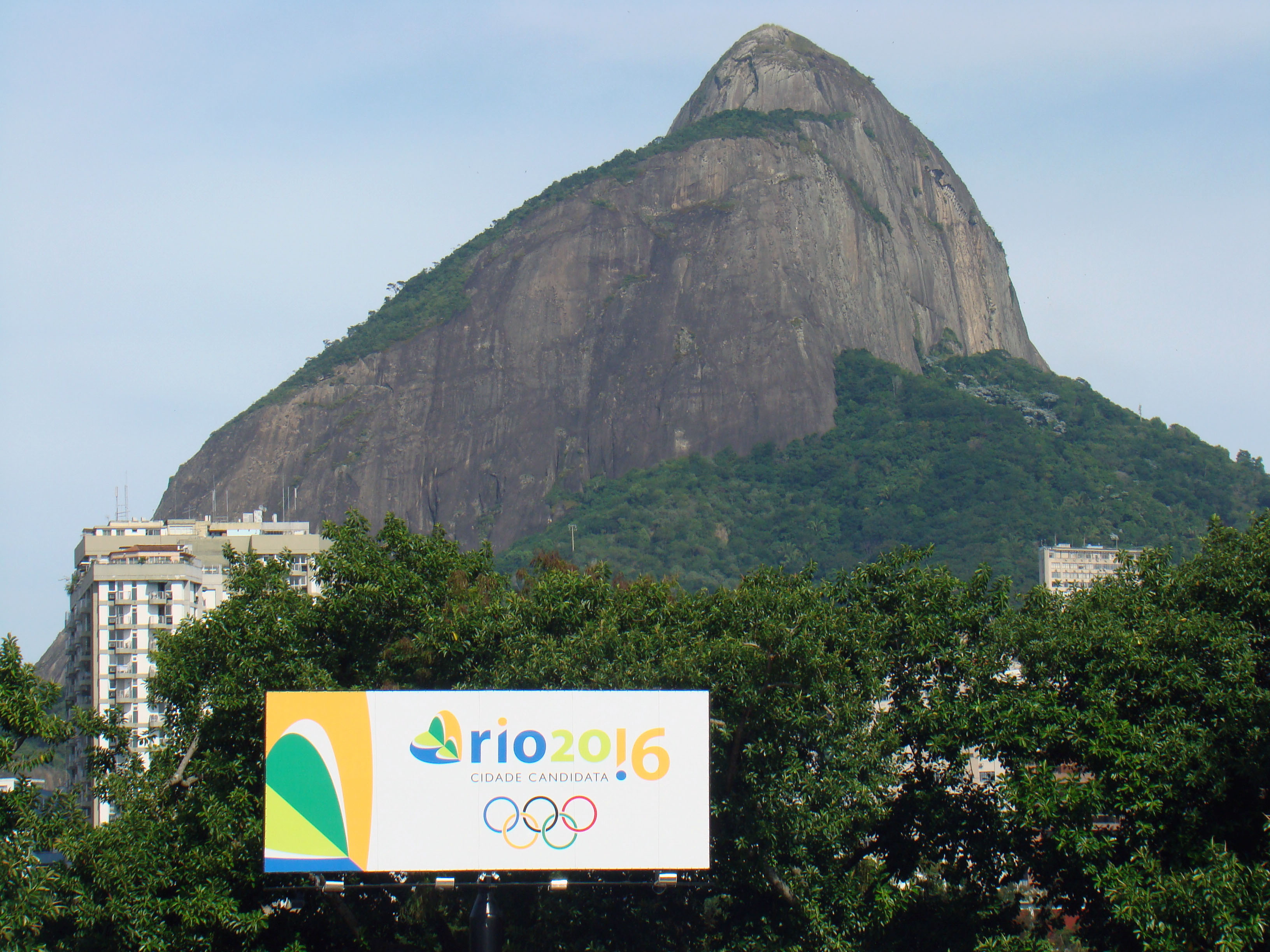
A large banner hangs in Rio de Janeiro as part of the look of the bid.

Rio de Janeiro's infrastructure, systems, management structures and staff readiness will be tested during the 2014 FIFA World Cup and during dedicated test events for the transport network in 2015. There will be 49,750 rooms to meet IOC requirements, of which some 1,700 are located in apartment hotels in the city and more than 13,000 in hotels throughout Rio de Janeiro and the football tournament host cities. Rio de Janeiro proposed the use of cruise ships and condominium apartments to overcome a possible shortage in the number of hotel rooms. Six modern cruise ships will provide more than 8,500 cabins. Media would be accommodated in a combination of media villages and hotels. Rio de Janeiro plans to implement 150 km (93 mi) of Olympic lanes connecting the four Olympic zones and the Antônio Carlos Jobim International Airport. An existing corridor of high-capacity rail and metro systems as well as motorways and major roads links three of the four Olympic zones, and with the development of the western corridor, all four zones will be connected. A bus rapid transit (BRT) system is going to be the main solution to the city's topography. Security and disaster-related risks for the event will be mitigated by the implementation of a comprehensive security operation. Crime in parts of Rio de Janeiro was considered to be an issue for the safety of people attending the Games. Rio de Janeiro's experience in mounting security structures around highly mediatized and crowd-attracting events is a positive aspect. The Federal Government will be responsible for the security of the 2016 Summer Olympics and Paralympics.

=== Finance ===
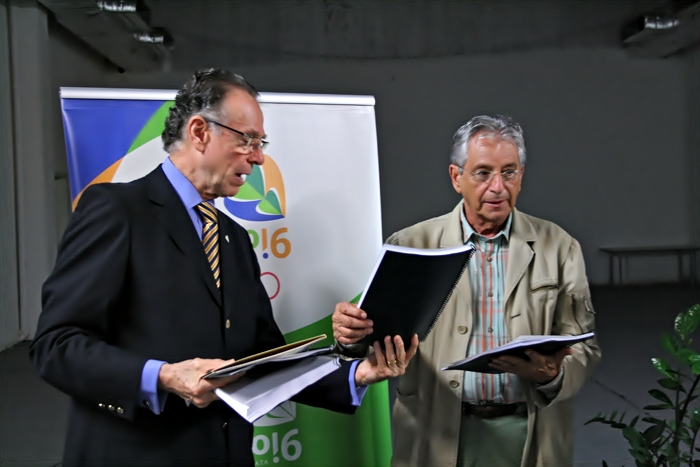
Bid president Carlos Arthur Nuzman presenting the specifications.

The three levels of Brazilian government assured the free provision of a range of services to the bid, including security, medical services, customs, transport, immigration, and other governmental services and support. Rio de Janeiro also approved funding of US$240 billion from the Program for Growth Acceleration (PAC) of the federal government. Other revenue-generating activities include sponsorship sales, ticketing program, licensing and merchandising. These revenues will be supplemented by IOC-secured commercial and broadcast contributions. Capital expenditure on infrastructure by the government or the private sector includes already committed and ongoing investments of US$3.9 billion on projects such as airport and subway expansions and construction of the metropolitan road arc. The OCOG budget does not assume any capital contributions to the construction of permanent or legacy venues, other than for Games overlay, including the construction of temporary venues. The balance of OCOG expenditures will be funded by the public sector, involving a combination of government commitments from Federal, State and Municipal levels. The OCOG budget and operating expenses are projected at US$2.8 billion, with its Olympic-related budget, including capital investments in transportation, sports venues and incremental costs being US$11.6 billion. The government submitted guarantees to cover any potential shortfall. The bid expenses for both Applicant and Candidature phases were of R$85,792 million, as released during the official closing of the campaign on November 11, 2009.
