= Pat Ryan (executive) =

American businessman

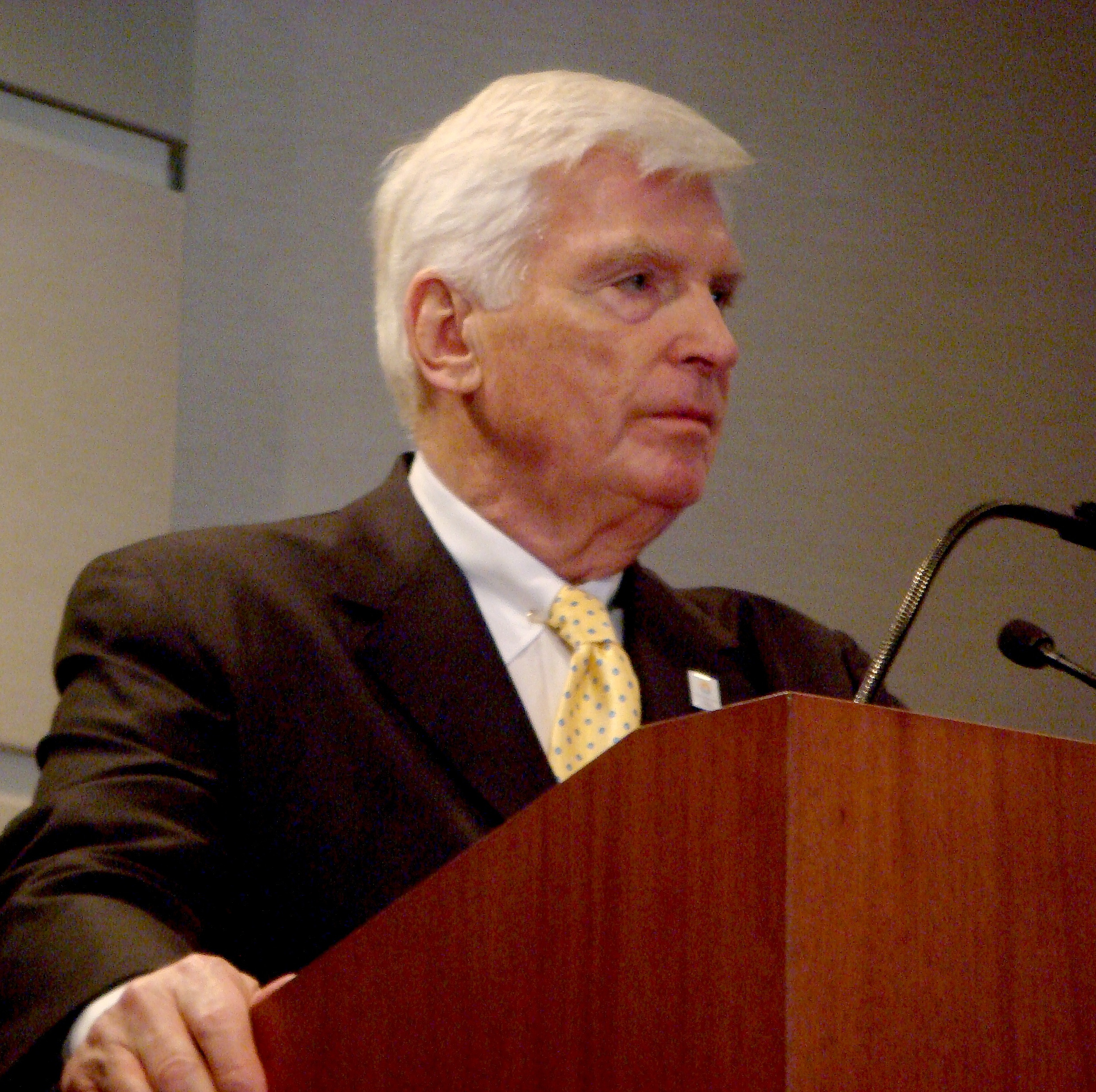
- Ryan in 2008
- Born: May 1937 (age 89); Milwaukee, Wisconsin
- Education: Northwestern University (BA)
- Spouse: Shirley Ryan
- Children: 3

Patrick George Ryan (born May 1937) is an American billionaire insurance businessman. He is the founder and retired chairman and CEO of Aon. In 2010, he founded Ryan Specialty Group (RSG) as a holding company aimed at providing specialty services to insurance brokers, agents and carriers. RSG's first subsidiary, ThinkRisk, began business in December 2009 to provide underwriting and claims management services for media, technology, advertising and network security.

Ryan was the chairman and CEO of the Chicago 2016 Olympic bid committee and is chairman of World Sport Chicago, an organization that formed out of Chicago's Olympic bid.

Ryan is a philanthropist in Chicago. He is married to Shirley Welsh Ryan, with whom he runs the Patrick G. and Shirley W. Ryan Foundation. He is also a benefactor of the Art Institute of Chicago Building's modern wing addition.

Ryan is a member and former chairman of the board of trustees at Northwestern University, where both major athletic facilities, Welsh-Ryan Arena and Ryan Field, are named after him. Ryan owns a large minority interest in the Chicago Bears.

== Early life ==
Ryan is the son of an Irish-American father who ran a Ford Motor Company dealership in suburban Milwaukee. He graduated with a bachelor's degree from Northwestern University's School of Business (now Kellogg School of Management) in 1959 with a degree in Finance and Literature. During his senior year, Ryan earned $8,000 selling personalized scrapbooks to dorm residents, an experience that "kindled his entrepreneurial spirit".

== Career ==
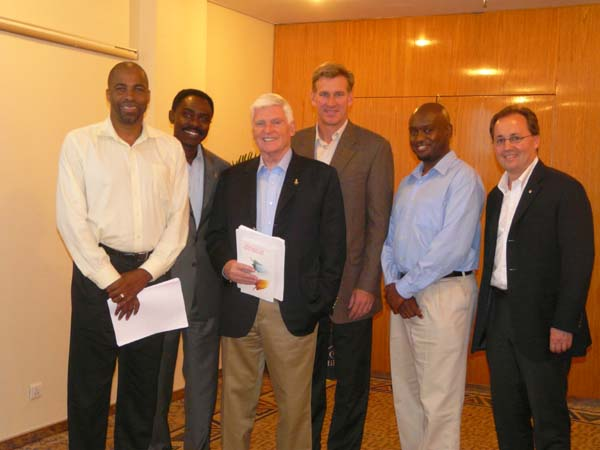
Pat Ryan front-and-center with his Chicago 2016 team

After graduating from Northwestern University, Ryan immediately joined Penn Mutual's Chicago office as a life insurance agent. In 1962, he founded the first Finance and Insurance (F&I) department at Dick Fencl Chevrolet in suburban Chicago, selling insurance products on behalf of Continental Casualty Company, now the primary subsidiary of CNA Financial. This move "forever changed how auto dealerships operate" and in 1964, Ryan founded Pat Ryan & Associates, a brokerage and underwriting agency. By 1968, the firm was selling $15 million in premiums a year. Ryan borrowed money to buy a dormant insurance company, enabling him to underwrite the products his company was selling. This move transformed Pat Ryan & Associates into a nationwide business, and in 1971, with $25 million in annual sales, he took the firm public. The stock offering helped raise capital to meet Ryan's long term goal: "diversification from a single line of insurance to multiple insurance products".

In 1976, Ryan changed the firm's name to Ryan Insurance Group and in 1977, he bought the retail brokerage units from Esmark Inc, "expanding into risk management services for commercial and industrial clients". In 1981, Ryan further expanded by purchasing the James S. Kemper agencies.

In 1982, Ryan Insurance Group merged with Combined International, and Ryan became CEO. The company continued to expand through organic growth and acquisitions, and in 1987, Ryan changed Combined's name to Aon. He was the company's chairman and CEO for 41 years. At Ryan's retirement in 2008, Aon operated with more than 500 offices in 120 countries generating revenues in excess of $7 billion. Aon is the largest reinsurance broker and second largest insurance broker in the world, and a leader in risk management and human capital consulting.

In 2010, Ryan formed Ryan Specialty Group (RSG), a global specialty insurance holding company with offices in North America and Europe. RSG's wholesale operation, RT Specialty, is the 3rd largest wholesale broker in the US. To date, there are 16 underwriting facilities within RSG Underwriting Managers (RSGUM).

== Alma mater ==
Ryan has been a member of Northwestern University's board of trustees for 37 years, 14 of which he was chairman. In 2009, Ryan was inducted into the Northwestern Athletic Hall of Fame. That year, Northwestern also awarded Ryan an honorary doctorate. In 2013, he received the Northwestern Alumni Association Medal of Honor, their highest award, given to alumni who combines superior professional distinction and/or exemplary volunteer service to society, with an outstanding record of service to Northwestern.

Pat Ryan and his wife, Shirley Welsh Ryan, have been donors for many of Northwestern University's facilities and programs, both academic and athletic. Over the years, the couple has supported Northwestern University by funding fellowships for graduate students in nanotechnology and scholarships for low-income students, contributing to the Feinberg School of Medicine's priorities, and endowing chairs. The music and communications building, which opened in 2015, was named after the Ryans for their longtime support of the arts at Northwestern. In 2018, Ryan Fieldhouse was unveiled.

Ryan is a member of the Sigma Chi fraternity.

In 2023, Krissie Harris, a candidate running for Evanston City Council received two $6,000 donations made by individuals connected to Pat Ryan. Evanston's Community Association For Better Government suggested the donations gave the appearance of a "quid pro quo" agreement between Pat Ryan, who wants the Evanston City Council to approve plans to re-zone and Rebuild Northwestern's Ryan field, and Krissie Harris. Krissie Harris returned the funds.

== Awards and honors ==
Ryan has received a number of awards and honors throughout his career. These include, among others:

- Horatio Alger Award (1987) – honors those who are dedicated to the principles of integrity, hard work, perseverance and compassion for others.
- American Academy of Arts and Sciences Inductee (2008) – one of the nation's oldest and most prestigious honorary societies and independent research centers, founded in 1780.
- International Insurance Society Hall of Fame (2008)
- College of Insurance – Insurance Leader of the Year (1997)
- Order of Lincoln Medallion (1998) – the highest award granted by the State of Illinois, recognizing a lifetime of accomplishment.
- The Insurance Federation of New York – Free Enterprise Award (1999)
- Brigham Young University – International Executive of the Year for Corporate Integrity (2002)
- Golden Plate Award of the American Academy of Achievement (2002) – presented by Awards Council member Dr. Francis Collins at the International Achievement Summit in Dublin, Ireland
- Ernst and Young Entrepreneur of the Year Lifetime Achievement Award (2008)
- Chicagoland Sports Hall of Fame (2016)

In 2004, Ryan hosted President George W. Bush during a political fundraising dinner at his home in Winnetka, Illinois. Later that year, he hosted another fundraiser with Bush's wife and daughters as guests. In November 2008, Ryan was named one of five co-chairs for Barack Obama's inaugural committee. Ryan, being a Republican, was chosen to reflect a bipartisan committee.

== Personal life ==
He is married to Shirley Ryan. They live in the Chicago area and have three children.
