= Olympic Congress =

Gathering of representatives from Olympic Movement

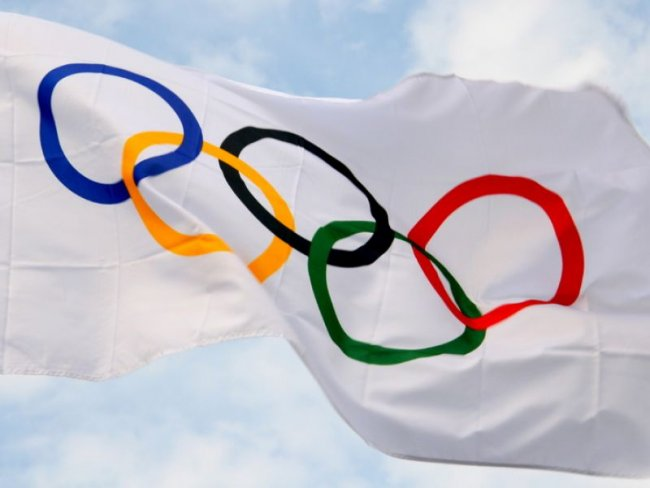
The Olympic flag

An Olympic Congress, also known as IOC Congress, is a large gathering of representatives from the different constituencies of the Olympic Movement, organised by the International Olympic Committee (IOC). As detailed in chapter 1, rule 4 of the Olympic Charter, the IOC President is responsible for convening a Congress, presiding over its proceedings and for determining its procedures. Olympic Congresses are not regular events in the IOC's calendar. As the Olympic Charter states, "The Olympic Congress gathers representatives of the constituents of the Olympic Movement, at intervals determined by the IOC".

As the role of an Olympic Congress is consultative, all recommendations from the Congress must be submitted to the IOC Session for formal adoption. The first Olympic Congress was held in Paris, France, in 1894. It was this Congress which founded and established the IOC and laid the groundwork for its statutes. The process of revival of the Olympic Games also began at the Paris Congress of 1894.

After 1894, and until 1930, there were eight Congresses covering various issues related to the burgeoning Olympic Movement. The last Congress before the Second World War was held in Berlin in 1930. After this time, there was then an interruption of more than forty years until the 10th Olympic Congress was held in Varna, Bulgaria, in 1973. Successive Congresses were held in Baden-Baden, Germany, in 1981, in Paris, France, in 1994, and then in Copenhagen, Denmark, in 2009.

== History ==
=== Postwar era ===
In his book entitled One Hundred Years of Olympic Congresses, Norbert Müller states that Pierre de Coubertin viewed Olympic Congresses, "as intellectual guidance and justification" and, "used them to unite modern sport, science, and the arts". But the Congresses, especially those after World War II, were the catalyst for some significant developments in the Olympic Movement.

==== Varna, Bulgaria 1973 ====
At the heart of the debate in Varna was the issue of amateurism. This topic featured in the discussions of nearly all the Congresses prior to 1930. At the Congress in Varna the IOC Eligibility Commission was tasked with examining the issue of eligibility, at that time found under Rule 26 of the Olympic Charter. The commission's work was brought to fruition the following year at the 75th IOC Session when delegates adopted a new eligibility rule. The new rule authorised financial and material assistance for elite sportsmen and women, but prohibited personal profits derived from a sporting activity.

==== Baden-Baden, Germany 1981 ====
The concerns of the athletes took centre place at the Congress in Baden-Baden. This was the first time that athletes played a leading role in a Congress and could express their opinions on the issues under discussion. This Congress paved the way for the creation of the IOC Athlete's Commission, which celebrated its 25th anniversary in 2007.

==== Paris, France 1994 ====
The primary concern of the Congress in Paris was the protection of the environment. The delegates focused on developing measures to optimise the Olympic Movement's contribution to preserving the environment. The 1994 Congress was the first time members of the media were invited to speak and had an entire discussion theme devoted to their concerns. This Congress was later entitled "The Congress of Unity" as the event was a testimony to the good relationship among the various constituents of the Olympic Family.

=== 21st century ===
==== Copenhagen, Denmark 2009 ====
In 2005, the IOC President Jacques Rogge called for the 13th Olympic Congress to be scheduled for 2009. On 8 February 2006, Copenhagen, Denmark, was chosen as the host of the 13th Olympic Congress defeating Cairo, Egypt, by 59 votes to 40. With this result, no Olympic Congress has ever taken place outside of Europe.

The nine original candidate cities were: Athens (Greece), Busan (South Korea), Cairo (Egypt), Copenhagen (Denmark), Lausanne (Switzerland), Mexico City (Mexico), Riga (Latvia), Taipei (Chinese Taipei/Taiwan) and Singapore. Athens was eliminated in the first round of voting and Riga in the second. Singapore lost a tie-breaker with Taipei in round three. Taipei was eliminated in the following round and Busan in the fifth round. Mexico City dropped out of the running in January 2006, followed by Lausanne a few days before the vote.

The 13th Olympic Congress was held in Copenhagen, Denmark, from 3 to 5 October 2009. The theme for the Congress in 2009 was the "Olympic Movement in Society". The 121st Session of the IOC was also held in Copenhagen on 2 October 2009 where the host city of the 2016 Summer Olympics was announced to be Rio de Janeiro (Brazil).

The participants for the 13th Olympic Congress included IOC members, honorary and honor members; representatives of the International Federations, National Olympic Committees and organising committees of the Olympic Games; athletes and athlete support staff (coaches, doctors and medical staff); referees, judges and technical officials; the IOC's Olympic partners; and the media. For the first time, members of the general public were invited to participate in the Olympic Congress. The recommendations from the 13th Olympic Congress will be forwarded to the 122nd IOC Session in Vancouver, Canada for adoption.

Preparations for the 13th Olympic Congress in Copenhagen got underway in 2007. In Guatemala City in July 2007, the IOC President Jacques Rogge made an official "call for contributions" to all the members of the Olympic Family. He also announced that - for the first time in the history of Olympic Congresses - the general public would be invited to express their opinions on the discussion themes. In order to facilitate this collection of contributions from the Olympic Family and the general public, the IOC launched the Virtual Olympic Congress.

This website was an important component of the "collection phase" in the preparatory process leading to the 2009 Congress in Copenhagen. The Virtual Olympic Congress was first opened in October 2007 for contributions from members of the Olympic Family. Throughout 2008, all participants were allowed to submit a written contribution, of a thousand words or less, until the collection phase ended on 31 December 2008. A synthesis of the results will be presented to the Congress for consideration. It is hoped that this initiative will help focus the discussions in Copenhagen.

== Themes ==
	Year	City	Themes
I	1894	Paris	1) Revival of the Olympic Games 2) Study and principles of amateurism
II	1897	Le Havre	Sports hygiene and pedagogy
III	1905	Brussels	Issues of sport and physical education
IV	1906	Paris	Incorporation of the fine arts in the Olympic Games and everyday life
V	1913	Lausanne	Psychology and physiology of sports
VI	1914	Paris	Unification of Olympic regulations and conditions for participation
VII	1921	Lausanne	Modification of the Olympic programme and conditions of participation
VIII	1925	Prague	1) Sports pedagogy 2) Olympic regulations
IX	1930	Berlin	Modification of Olympic regulations
X	1973	Varna	Sport for a world of peace 1) Redefinition of the Olympic Movement and its future 2) Relations between the IOC, International Federations and National Olympic Committees 3) Plans for future Olympic Games
XI	1981	Baden-Baden	United by and for sport 1) The future of the Olympic Games 2) International cooperation 3) The future of the Olympic Movement
XII	1994	Paris	Centennial Olympic Congress, Congress of Unity 1) The Olympic Movement's contribution to modern society 2) The contemporary athlete 3) Sport in its social context 4) Sport and the mass media
XIII	2009	Copenhagen	The Role of the Olympic Movement in Society 1) The athletes 2) The Olympic Games 3) The structure of the Olympic Movement 4) Olympism and youth 5) The digital revolution
