= 13th Olympic Congress =

Logo of the 13th Olympic Congress.

The 13th Olympic Congress was held between 3–5 October 2009 in Copenhagen, Denmark, by the International Olympic Committee (IOC). It was held together with the meetings of the executive board and the 121st IOC Session.

== History ==
Convened on the initiative of President Jacques Rogge, the 13th Olympic Congress brought together all the constituent parties of the Olympic Movement to study and discuss the current functioning of the Movement and define the main development axes for the future. "This will be an important milestone and a chance for the entire Olympic family to discuss and debate some major issues around the role of the Olympic Movement in society. How can we use digital technologies to communicate the values of Olympism? How do we better connect with young people? What can we all do to encourage people to lead active, healthy lifestyles? These are just some of the questions we will grapple with at the Congress. Getting at some answers won't be easy, but is very necessary." said Jacques Rogge. President Rogge underlined in his short address the role sport and the Olympic Movement play in society. "Sport has played, plays and will always play, an important role worldwide." According to Rogge, the IOC and all other members of the Olympic Movement will seize the opportunity of the 13th Congress in Copenhagen to demonstrate what has already been achieved in this field, that the Movement is committed to fully playing its role and that it is taking up every challenge in order to set the bar even higher.

The 13th Olympic Congress was held from 3 to 5 October 2009 in the Danish capital. It brought together around 1,000 participants representing: IOC members; IOC honorary and honour members; representatives of the International Federations, National Olympic Committees, the athletes and Organising Committees for the Olympic Games; athletes and athlete support staff (coaches, doctors and medical staff); referees, judges and technical officials; the IOC's Olympic partners; and the media. The various stages of the Olympic Congress run from 1 July 2007 until the end of 2009. The meetings in Copenhagen will mark the culmination of this process. But even then, the work will not be finished, as the next task will be to implement the main Congress recommendations that the Session has accepted. The first meeting of the 2009 Congress Commission, which is chaired by President Rogge, and includes the entire membership of the EB, met for the first time this morning to start the process that will lead to the 13th Olympic Congress in Copenhagen in October 2009. The 13th Olympic Congress will include a public consultation for the first time in the history of Olympic congresses. The Chairman of the Congress Organising Committee and President of the National Olympic Committee of Denmark, IOC member Kai Holm, is convinced that the Olympic Congress will strengthen Denmark's ties with the sports world, especially the various International Federations and the National Olympic Committees around the world. "Such an opening allows us to exchange points of view, learn from each other and establish contacts which will be valuable for years to come", he believes. Through this consultation, a list of sixty-six recommendations to strength and improve the Olympic Movement was published.

The city of Copenhagen was chosen on 8 February by the 118th IOC Session held in Turin, Italy. The other candidates were Athens (Greece), Busan (South Korea), Cairo (Egypt), Riga (Latvia), Singapore (Singapore), and Taipei (Chinese Taipei).

== Participants ==
More 1,000 people were present, including past and present IOC members, officials, athletes, etc. In addition to that, the Congress was attended by :

- United Nations Commissioner Adolf Ogi
- European Union President Jose Manuel Barroso
- Denmark Crown Prince Frederik
- Spain King Juan Carlos I
- Japan Crown Prince Naruhito
- United States President Barack Obama
- Brazil President Luiz Inácio Lula da Silva
- Monaco Prince Albert II
- Luxembourg Grand Duke Henri
- Netherlands Prince Willem-Alexander
- United Kingdom Princess Anne

== See also ==
- List of IOC meetings
