= 121st IOC Session =

2009 session of the International Olympic Committee in Copenhagen

2009 IOC presidential election
- 9 October 2009
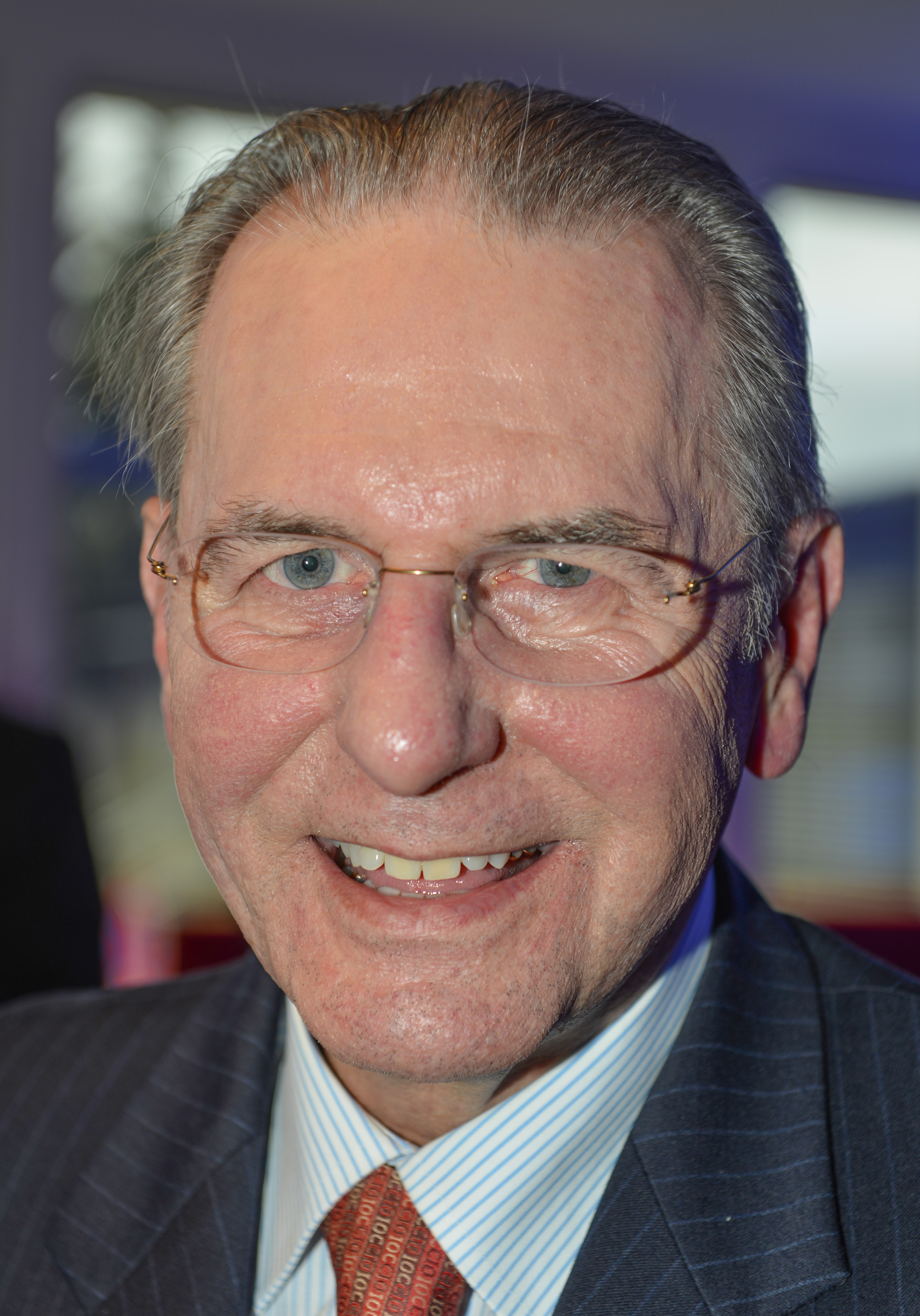
Candidate	Jacques Rogge
Home state	Belgium
Popular vote	Unopposed
President before election
(Belgium) Jacques Rogge
Elected President
(Belgium) Jacques Rogge

Logo of the 121st IOC Session.

The 121st International Olympic Committee (IOC) Session was held on 1–9 October 2009 in Copenhagen, Denmark, during which Rio de Janeiro was selected as the host city of the 2016 Summer Olympics. The city of Copenhagen was chosen on 8 February 2006 by the 118th IOC Session held in Turin, Italy to stage the 13th Olympic Congress, together with the meetings of the Executive Board and the 121st IOC Session. The other candidates were Athens (Greece), Busan (South Korea), Cairo (Egypt), Riga (Latvia), Singapore, Taipei (Chinese Taipei). Convened on the initiative of President Jacques Rogge, the 13th Olympic Congress brought together all the constituent parties of the Olympic Movement to study and discuss the current functioning of the Movement and define the main development axes for the future.

The programme for the meeting was:

- 1–2 October: Part I of the IOC Session. The 2016 host city was announced on October 2: Rio de Janeiro (Brazil).
- 3–5 October: The Olympic Congress.
- 7–9 October: Part II of the IOC Session. Elections for IOC President and IOC Members were held, as well as the final vote on the potential inclusion of golf and rugby sevens in the 2016 Games. Both sports were approved for the 2016 programme.

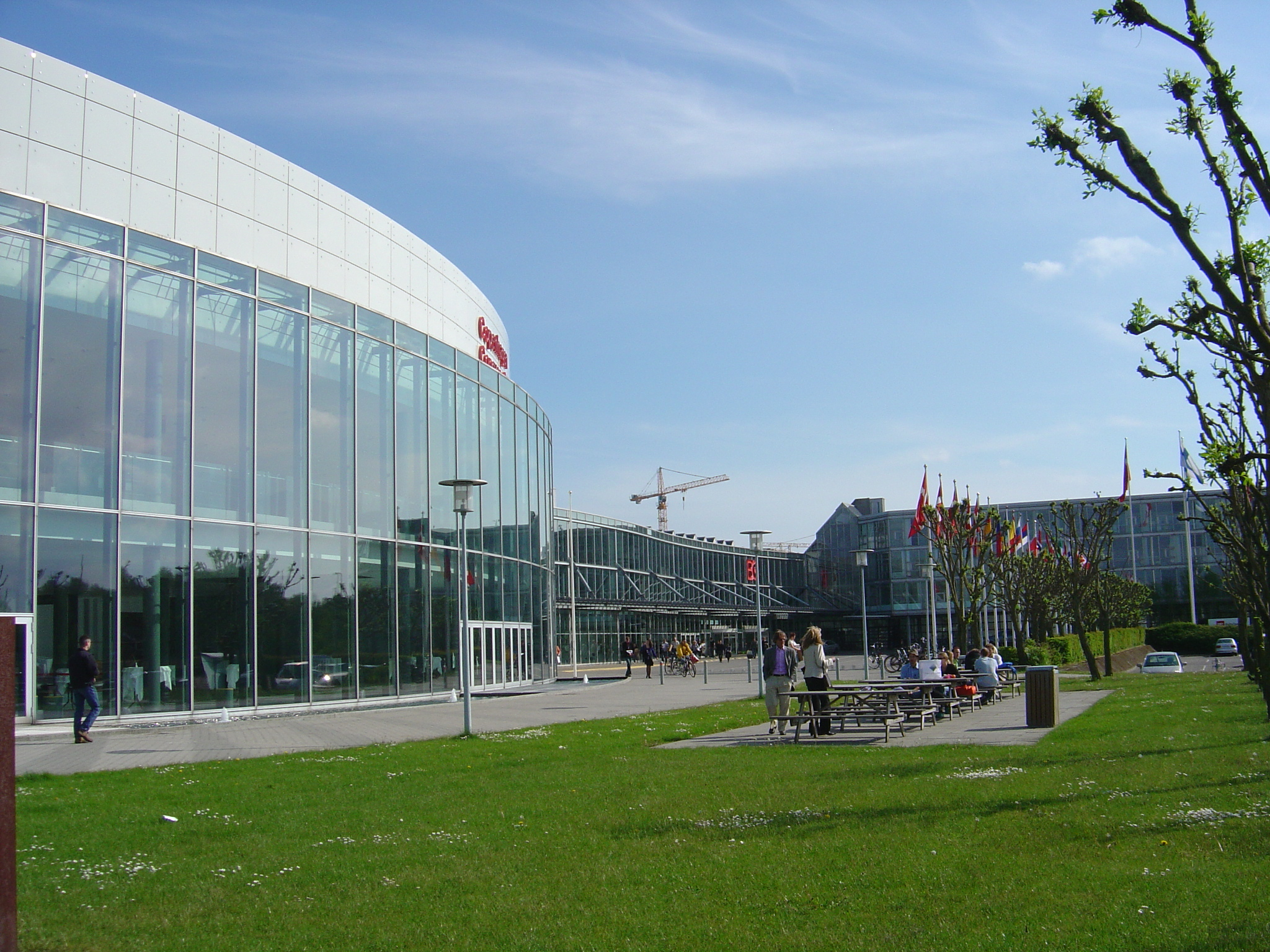
The Bella Center was the location used for the IOC Session & Olympic Congress

== 2016 Olympic host city election ==
On 2 October 2009, the IOC voted to elect the host city of the 2016 Summer Olympics. Rio de Janeiro was elected host city after three rounds of voting. This was Rio's fourth bid for the Olympic Games. Jacques Rogge, former president of International Olympic Committee said, "I have the honor to announce that the games of the 31st Olympiad are awarded to the city of Rio de Janeiro."

Election of the Host City of the 2016 Summer Olympics — ballot results
City	Country (NOC)	Round 1	Round 2	Round 3
Rio de Janeiro	Brazil	26 (27.66%)	46 (48.42%)	66 (67.35%)
Madrid	Spain	28 (29.79%)	29 (30.53%)	32 (32.65%)
Tokyo	Japan	22 (23.40%)	20 (21.05%)	—
Chicago	United States	18 (19.15%)	—	—
121st IOC Session	Vote details	Round 1	Round 2	Round 3
121st Session of the International Olympic Committee. Copenhagen - Denmark	Eligible	95	97	99
121st Session of the International Olympic Committee. Copenhagen - Denmark	Participants	94	96	98
121st Session of the International Olympic Committee. Copenhagen - Denmark	Abstentions	0	1	0
121st Session of the International Olympic Committee. Copenhagen - Denmark	Valid ballots	94	95	98
Members unable to vote
Members from countries with candidate cities		Other members		
(United States) Anita L. Defrantz · (United States) James L. Easton · (Japan) Chiharu Igaya · (Japan) Shun-Ichiro Okano · (Brazil) João Havelange · (Brazil) Carlos Arthur Nuzman · (Spain) Juan Antonio Samaranch Jr.		(Belgium) Jacques Rogge (IOC president) · (South Korea) Lee Kun-hee (suspended) · (Guinea) Alpha Ibrahim Diallo (absent) · (Finland) Saku Koivu (absent)		

- Following Chicago's elimination, the two American IOC members were able to vote in the second and final rounds of voting.
- Following Tokyo's elimination, the two Japanese IOC members were also able to vote in the final round of voting.

=== Later corruption investigations ===
In 2017, Brazilian police and prosecutors investigated allegations that the Rio 2016 bidding process had involved vote-buying. The investigation focused on claims that Carlos Arthur Nuzman, then president of the Brazilian Olympic Committee and head of the Rio 2016 bid committee, helped arrang a US$2 million payment connected to Lamine Diack and Papa Massata Diack shortly before Rio was selected as host city.

In 2019, former Rio de Janeiro governor Sérgio Cabral testified that he had paid US$2 million in bribes to secure votes for Rio's bid, allegations that led the IOC to open an inquiry. Nuzman denied wrongdoing. In 2024, a Brazilian federal court annulled corruption convictions related to the Rio selection, ruling that the judge who had issued the convictions lacked legal competence in the case.

== IOC elections and membership ==
On 9 October 2009, Jacques Rogge was re-elected as IOC president for a final four-year term. He was the only candidate and was re-elected by a vote of 88-1, with three abstentions.

The session also elected Mario Pescante and Ng Ser Miang as IOC vice-presidents, and Craig Reedie and John Coates to the IOC Executive Board. Six new IOC members were elected: Richard Peterkin, Crown Prince Frederik of Denmark, Habu Ahmed Gumel, Habib Abdul Nabi Macki, Lydia Nsekera, and Göran Petersson.

== New sports ==
The Session decided to add Rugby Sevens and Golf to the Rio 2016 program. The tally for rugby was 81 in favor, with 8 against, and golf was approved 63–26. Neither sport is new to the Olympics — rugby was last featured at the Olympics in 1924, and golf in 1904.

== See also ==
- List of IOC meetings
- 117th IOC Session
- 123rd IOC Session
- 125th IOC Session
- Rio de Janeiro bid for the 2016 Summer Olympics
