= List of bids for the Summer Olympics =

The Summer Olympics are the world's largest multi-sport event, and are organized by the International Olympic Committee (IOC) every four years. Selection of the host city is done at an IOC Session four to seven years prior to the tournament, in which the IOC members vote between candidate cities which have submitted bids. As of the selection of the 2016 Summer Olympics, 28 games have been held in 23 cities in 19 countries. Bids have been made by 64 cities in 34 countries.

The bid process consists of two rounds. First, cities and national Olympic committees (NOCs) may show their interest and submit a preliminary bid, becoming applicant cities. Through analysis of the questionnaires, the IOC gave a weighted-average score to each city based on the scores obtained in each of the questionnaire's eleven themes: political and social support, general infrastructure, sports venues, Olympic Village, environment, accommodation, transport, security, past experience, finance, and legacy. IOC's executive committee then selects a short-list of candidate cities. The candidate cities are investigated by the IOC Evaluation Committee, who make an evaluation report. These submit a more extensive bid book and are subject to additional evaluation, which is presented to the IOC members. Voting is by exhaustive ballot; there may be multiple rounds until a single city holds a majority of the votes. IOC members from a candidate NOC may not vote in any round while their country remains in the election.

The first three Games were not subject to bids: the first IOC Session, in 1894, awarded the first Games to Athens (1896) and Paris (1900), respectively. The 1904 Olympics were initially awarded to Chicago, but then moved to St. Louis to be co-located with the World Fair. A system of bids was introduced ahead of the 1908 Olympics, which were awarded to Rome. After the 1906 eruption of Mount Vesuvius, Italy returned the Games to IOC, which awarded them to London. The 1916 Olympics were awarded to Berlin, but cancelled due to the First World War. The 1940 Olympics were originally awarded to Tokyo, but after the Second Sino-Japanese War broke out in 1938, they were returned to the IOC, who awarded them to Helsinki. Those Games, and the 1944 Olympics awarded to London, were ultimately cancelled due to the Second World War. The 1956 Olympics were awarded to Melbourne, but Australian horse quarantine rules forced the equestrian events to be held in Stockholm. Three times there have been only a single bid: Stockholm in 1912, and Los Angeles in 1932 and 1984. Starting with the 2004 Olympics, only the highest-rated cities are short-listed for the final IOC vote.

Paris hosted the 2024 Games, and thus joined London in hosting three Games, as will Los Angeles when they host the 2028 Games. London, Antwerp, Munich and Sydney are the only cities to have never failed to win a bid. St. Louis is the only city to have hosted the Games without submitting a bid. Helsinki, Minneapolis, Montreal and Munich have bid for both Summer and Winter Olympics; all but Minneapolis have succeeded at winning Summer bids, but none have held Winter Olympics. Detroit is the most unsuccessful city, having failed seven times. Los Angeles has made the most bids, succeeding three times and failing six times. Amsterdam, Budapest and Lausanne have all failed five times. The United States has made the most bids, having bid for 22 games, including all games from 1944 through 1984.

== By year ==
The following is a list of bids for the Summer Olympics. It consists of the year the Games were held or scheduled to be held, the date the decision was made, the city and country which issued the bid, the votes at the IOC Session for each voting round, and the ultimate host of the Games. The bid listed first for each games is the one selected by the IOC, whether or not it ultimately hosted the games.

Year	Session	Bid(s)		Vote					Host
Year	Session	City	Country	Round 1	Round 2	Round 3	Round 4	Round 5	Host
1896	—	—	—	—	—	—	—	—	(Kingdom of Greece) Athens
1900	—	—	—	—	—	—	—	—	(France) Paris
1904	—	Chicago	United States	—	—	—	—	—	(United States) St. Louis
1908	—	Rome	(Kingdom of Italy) Italy	—	—	—	—	—	(United Kingdom) London
1908	—	London	Great Britain	—	—	—	—	—	(United Kingdom) London
1908	—	Milan	(Kingdom of Italy) Italy	—	—	—	—	—	(United Kingdom) London
1908	—	Berlin	(German Empire) Germany	—	—	—	—	—	(United Kingdom) London
1912	—	Stockholm	Sweden	—	—	—	—	—	(Sweden) Stockholm
1916	—	Berlin	(German Empire) Germany	—	—	—	—	—	(German Empire) Berlin (cancelled)
1916	—	Alexandria	Egypt	—	—	—	—	—	(German Empire) Berlin (cancelled)
1916	—	Amsterdam	Netherlands	—	—	—	—	—	(German Empire) Berlin (cancelled)
1916	—	Brussels	Belgium	—	—	—	—	—	(German Empire) Berlin (cancelled)
1916	—	Budapest	Austria-Hungary	—	—	—	—	—	(German Empire) Berlin (cancelled)
1916	—	Cleveland	United States	—	—	—	—	—	(German Empire) Berlin (cancelled)
1920	—	Antwerp	Belgium	—	—	—	—	—	(Belgium) Antwerp
1920	—	Amsterdam	Netherlands	—	—	—	—	—	(Belgium) Antwerp
1920	—	Lyon	France	—	—	—	—	—	(Belgium) Antwerp
1920	—	Atlanta	United States	—	—	—	—	—	(Belgium) Antwerp
1920	—	Budapest	Hungary	—	—	—	—	—	(Belgium) Antwerp
1920	—	Cleveland	United States	—	—	—	—	—	(Belgium) Antwerp
1920	—	Havana	Cuba	—	—	—	—	—	(Belgium) Antwerp
1920	—	Lyon	France	—	—	—	—	—	(Belgium) Antwerp
1920	—	Philadelphia	United States	—	—	—	—	—	(Belgium) Antwerp
1924	—	Paris	France	—	—	—	—	—	(France) Paris
1924	—	Amsterdam	Netherlands	—	—	—	—	—	(France) Paris
1924	—	Barcelona	Spain	—	—	—	—	—	(France) Paris
1924	—	Los Angeles	United States	—	—	—	—	—	(France) Paris
1924	—	Prague	Czechoslovakia	—	—	—	—	—	(France) Paris
1924	—	Rome	(Kingdom of Italy) Italy	—	—	—	—	—	(France) Paris
1928	—	Amsterdam	Netherlands	—	—	—	—	—	(Netherlands) Amsterdam
1928	—	Los Angeles	United States	—	—	—	—	—	(Netherlands) Amsterdam
1932	4 October 1929	Los Angeles	United States	—	—	—	—	—	(United States) Los Angeles
1936	—	Berlin	Germany	43	—	—	—	—	(Germany) Berlin
1936	—	Barcelona	Spain	16	—	—	—	—	(Germany) Berlin
1936	—	Alexandria	(Kingdom of Egypt) Egypt	—	—	—	—	—	(Germany) Berlin
1936	—	Budapest	Hungary	—	—	—	—	—	(Germany) Berlin
1936	—	Buenos Aires	Argentina	—	—	—	—	—	(Germany) Berlin
1936	—	Cologne	Germany	—	—	—	—	—	(Germany) Berlin
1936	—	Dublin	Ireland	—	—	—	—	—	(Germany) Berlin
1936	—	Frankfurt	Germany	—	—	—	—	—	(Germany) Berlin
1936	—	Helsinki	Finland	—	—	—	—	—	(Germany) Berlin
1936	—	Lausanne	Switzerland	—	—	—	—	—	(Germany) Berlin
1936	—	Montevideo	Uruguay	—	—	—	—	—	(Germany) Berlin
1936	—	Nuremberg	Germany	—	—	—	—	—	(Germany) Berlin
1936	—	Rio de Janeiro	Brazil	—	—	—	—	—	(Germany) Berlin
1936	—	Rome	(Kingdom of Italy) Italy	—	—	—	—	—	(Germany) Berlin
1940	31 August 1936	Tokyo	Japan	—	—	—	—	—	(Japan) Tokyo (cancelled)
1940	31 August 1936	Helsinki	Finland	—	—	—	—	—	(Japan) Tokyo (cancelled)
1944	—	London	Great Britain	—	—	—	—	—	(United Kingdom) London (cancelled)
1944	—	Rome	(Kingdom of Italy) Italy	—	—	—	—	—	(United Kingdom) London (cancelled)
1944	—	Detroit	United States	—	—	—	—	—	(United Kingdom) London (cancelled)
1944	—	Lausanne	Switzerland	—	—	—	—	—	(United Kingdom) London (cancelled)
1944	—	Athens	(Kingdom of Greece) Greece	—	—	—	—	—	(United Kingdom) London (cancelled)
1944	—	Budapest	Hungary	—	—	—	—	—	(United Kingdom) London (cancelled)
1944	—	Helsinki	Finland	—	—	—	—	—	(United Kingdom) London (cancelled)
1944	—	Montreal	Canada	—	—	—	—	—	(United Kingdom) London (cancelled)
1948	—	London	Great Britain	—	—	—	—	—	(United Kingdom) London
1948	—	Baltimore	United States	—	—	—	—	—	(United Kingdom) London
1948	—	Lausanne	Switzerland	—	—	—	—	—	(United Kingdom) London
1948	—	Los Angeles	United States	—	—	—	—	—	(United Kingdom) London
1948	—	Minneapolis	United States	—	—	—	—	—	(United Kingdom) London
1948	—	Philadelphia	United States	—	—	—	—	—	(United Kingdom) London
1952	21 June 1947	Helsinki	Finland	14	15	—	—	—	(Finland) Helsinki
1952	21 June 1947	Los Angeles	United States	4	5	—	—	—	(Finland) Helsinki
1952	21 June 1947	Minneapolis	United States	4	5	—	—	—	(Finland) Helsinki
1952	21 June 1947	Amsterdam	Netherlands	3	3	—	—	—	(Finland) Helsinki
1952	21 June 1947	Detroit	United States	2	—	—	—	—	(Finland) Helsinki
1952	21 June 1947	Chicago	United States	1	—	—	—	—	(Finland) Helsinki
1952	21 June 1947	Philadelphia	United States	0	—	—	—	—	(Finland) Helsinki
1952	21 June 1947	Athens	(Kingdom of Greece) Greece	0	—	—	—	—	(Finland) Helsinki
1952	21 June 1947	Lausanne	Switzerland	0	—	—	—	—	(Finland) Helsinki
1952	21 June 1947	Stockholm	Sweden	0	—	—	—	—	(Finland) Helsinki
1956	28 April 1949	Melbourne	Australia	14	18	19	21	—	(Australia) Melbourne
1956	28 April 1949	Buenos Aires	Argentina	9	12	13	20	—	(Australia) Melbourne
1956	28 April 1949	Los Angeles	United States	5	4	5	—	—	(Australia) Melbourne
1956	28 April 1949	Detroit	United States	2	4	4	—	—	(Australia) Melbourne
1956	28 April 1949	Mexico City	Mexico	9	3	—	—	—	(Australia) Melbourne
1956	28 April 1949	Chicago	United States	1	—	—	—	—	(Australia) Melbourne
1956	28 April 1949	Minneapolis	United States	1	—	—	—	—	(Australia) Melbourne
1956	28 April 1949	Philadelphia	United States	1	—	—	—	—	(Australia) Melbourne
1956	28 April 1949	San Francisco	United States	0	—	—	—	—	(Australia) Melbourne
1956	28 April 1949	Montreal	Canada	0	—	—	—	—	(Australia) Melbourne
1960	15 June 1955	Rome	Italy	15	26	35	—	—	(Italy) Rome
1960	15 June 1955	Lausanne	Switzerland	14	21	24	—	—	(Italy) Rome
1960	15 June 1955	Detroit	United States	6	11	—	—	—	(Italy) Rome
1960	15 June 1955	Budapest	Hungary	8	1	—	—	—	(Italy) Rome
1960	15 June 1955	Brussels	Belgium	6	—	—	—	—	(Italy) Rome
1960	15 June 1955	Mexico City	Mexico	6	—	—	—	—	(Italy) Rome
1960	15 June 1955	Tokyo	Japan	6	—	—	—	—	(Italy) Rome
1964	26 May 1959	Tokyo	Japan	30	—	—	—	—	(Japan) Tokyo
1964	26 May 1959	Detroit	United States	10	—	—	—	—	(Japan) Tokyo
1964	26 May 1959	Vienna	Austria	9	—	—	—	—	(Japan) Tokyo
1964	26 May 1959	Brussels	Belgium	5	—	—	—	—	(Japan) Tokyo
1968	18 October 1963	Mexico City	Mexico	30	—	—	—	—	Mexico City
1968	18 October 1963	Detroit	United States	14	—	—	—	—	Mexico City
1968	18 October 1963	Lyon	France	12	—	—	—	—	Mexico City
1968	18 October 1963	Buenos Aires	Argentina	2	—	—	—	—	Mexico City
1972	25 April 1966	Munich	West Germany	29	31	—	—	—	(Germany) Munich
1972	25 April 1966	Madrid	Spain	16	16	—	—	—	(Germany) Munich
1972	25 April 1966	Montreal	Canada	6	13	—	—	—	(Germany) Munich
1972	25 April 1966	Detroit	United States	6	—	—	—	—	(Germany) Munich
1976	12 May 1970	Montreal	Canada	25	41	—	—	—	(Canada) Montreal
1976	12 May 1970	Moscow	Soviet Union	28	28	—	—	—	(Canada) Montreal
1976	12 May 1970	Los Angeles	United States	17	—	—	—	—	(Canada) Montreal
1980	13 October 1974	Moscow	Soviet Union	39	—	—	—	—	(Soviet Union) Moscow
1980	13 October 1974	Los Angeles	United States	20	—	—	—	—	(Soviet Union) Moscow
1984	18 May 1978	Los Angeles	United States	—	—	—	—	—	(United States) Los Angeles
1988	30 September 1981	Seoul	South Korea	52	—	—	—	—	(South Korea) Seoul
1988	30 September 1981	Nagoya	Japan	27	—	—	—	—	(South Korea) Seoul
1992	16 October 1986	Barcelona	Spain	29	37	47	—	—	(Spain) Barcelona
1992	16 October 1986	Paris	France	19	20	23	—	—	(Spain) Barcelona
1992	16 October 1986	Brisbane	Australia	11	9	10	—	—	(Spain) Barcelona
1992	16 October 1986	Belgrade	Yugoslavia	13	11	5	—	—	(Spain) Barcelona
1992	16 October 1986	Birmingham	United Kingdom	8	8	—	—	—	(Spain) Barcelona
1992	16 October 1986	Amsterdam	Netherlands	5	—	—	—	—	(Spain) Barcelona
1996	18 September 1990	Atlanta	United States	19	20	26	34	51	(United States) Atlanta
1996	18 September 1990	Athens	Greece	23	23	26	30	35	(United States) Atlanta
1996	18 September 1990	Toronto	Canada	14	17	18	22	—	(United States) Atlanta
1996	18 September 1990	Melbourne	Australia	12	21	16	—	—	(United States) Atlanta
1996	18 September 1990	Manchester	United Kingdom	11	5	—	—	—	(United States) Atlanta
1996	18 September 1990	Belgrade	Yugoslavia	7	—	—	—	—	(United States) Atlanta
2000	23 September 1993	Sydney	Australia	30	30	37	45	—	(Australia) Sydney
2000	23 September 1993	Beijing	China	32	37	40	43	—	(Australia) Sydney
2000	23 September 1993	Manchester	United Kingdom	11	13	11	—	—	(Australia) Sydney
2000	23 September 1993	Berlin	Germany	9	9	—	—	—	(Australia) Sydney
2000	23 September 1993	Istanbul	Turkey	7	—	—	—	—	(Australia) Sydney
2000	23 September 1993	Brasília	Brazil	Withdrew					(Australia) Sydney
2000	23 September 1993	Milan	Italy	Withdrew					(Australia) Sydney
2000	23 September 1993	Tashkent	Uzbekistan	Withdrew					(Australia) Sydney
2004	5 September 1997	Athens	Greece	32	—	38	52	66	(Greece) Athens
2004	5 September 1997	Rome	Italy	23	—	28	35	41	(Greece) Athens
2004	5 September 1997	Cape Town	South Africa	16	62	22	20	—	(Greece) Athens
2004	5 September 1997	Stockholm	Sweden	20	—	19	—	—	(Greece) Athens
2004	5 September 1997	Buenos Aires	Argentina	16	44	—	—	—	(Greece) Athens
2004	5 September 1997	Istanbul	Turkey	—	—	—	—	—	(Greece) Athens
2004	5 September 1997	Lille	France	—	—	—	—	—	(Greece) Athens
2004	5 September 1997	Rio de Janeiro	Brazil	—	—	—	—	—	(Greece) Athens
2004	5 September 1997	Saint Petersburg	Russia	—	—	—	—	—	(Greece) Athens
2004	5 September 1997	San Juan	Puerto Rico	—	—	—	—	—	(Greece) Athens
2004	5 September 1997	Seville	Spain	—	—	—	—	—	(Greece) Athens
2008	13 July 2001	Beijing	China	44	56	—	—	—	(China) Beijing
2008	13 July 2001	Toronto	Canada	20	22	—	—	—	(China) Beijing
2008	13 July 2001	Paris	France	15	18	—	—	—	(China) Beijing
2008	13 July 2001	Istanbul	Turkey	17	9	—	—	—	(China) Beijing
2008	13 July 2001	Osaka	Japan	6	—	—	—	—	(China) Beijing
2008	13 July 2001	Bangkok	Thailand	—	—	—	—	—	(China) Beijing
2008	13 July 2001	Cairo	Egypt	—	—	—	—	—	(China) Beijing
2008	13 July 2001	Havana	Cuba	—	—	—	—	—	(China) Beijing
2008	13 July 2001	Kuala Lumpur	Malaysia	—	—	—	—	—	(China) Beijing
2008	13 July 2001	Seville	Spain	—	—	—	—	—	(China) Beijing
2012	6 July 2005	London	United Kingdom	22	27	39	54	—	(United Kingdom) London
2012	6 July 2005	Paris	France	21	25	33	50	—	(United Kingdom) London
2012	6 July 2005	Madrid	Spain	20	32	31	—	—	(United Kingdom) London
2012	6 July 2005	New York City	United States	19	16	—	—	—	(United Kingdom) London
2012	6 July 2005	Moscow	Russia	15	—	—	—	—	(United Kingdom) London
2012	6 July 2005	Havana	Cuba	—	—	—	—	—	(United Kingdom) London
2012	6 July 2005	Istanbul	Turkey	—	—	—	—	—	(United Kingdom) London
2012	6 July 2005	Leipzig	Germany	—	—	—	—	—	(United Kingdom) London
2012	6 July 2005	Rio de Janeiro	Brazil	—	—	—	—	—	(United Kingdom) London
2016	2 October 2009	Rio de Janeiro	Brazil	26	46	66	—	—	(Brazil) Rio de Janeiro
2016	2 October 2009	Madrid	Spain	28	29	32	—	—	(Brazil) Rio de Janeiro
2016	2 October 2009	Tokyo	Japan	22	20	—	—	—	(Brazil) Rio de Janeiro
2016	2 October 2009	Chicago	United States	18	—	—	—	—	(Brazil) Rio de Janeiro
2016	2 October 2009	Baku	Azerbaijan	—	—	—	—	—	(Brazil) Rio de Janeiro
2016	2 October 2009	Doha	Qatar	—	—	—	—	—	(Brazil) Rio de Janeiro
2016	2 October 2009	Prague	Czech Republic	—	—	—	—	—	(Brazil) Rio de Janeiro
2020	7 September 2013	Tokyo	Japan	42	—	60	—	—	(Japan) Tokyo
2020	7 September 2013	Istanbul	Turkey	26	49	36	—	—	(Japan) Tokyo
2020	7 September 2013	Madrid	Spain	26	45	—	—	—	(Japan) Tokyo
2020	7 September 2013	Baku	Azerbaijan	—	—	—	—	—	(Japan) Tokyo
2020	7 September 2013	Doha	Qatar	—	—	—	—	—	(Japan) Tokyo
2020	7 September 2013	Rome	Italy	Withdrew					(Japan) Tokyo
2024	13 September 2017	Paris	France	Unanimous					(France) Paris
2024	13 September 2017	Los Angeles	United States	Withdrew; selected for the 2028 bid instead					(France) Paris
2024	13 September 2017	Budapest	Hungary	Withdrew					(France) Paris
2024	13 September 2017	Hamburg	Germany	Withdrew					(France) Paris
2024	13 September 2017	Rome	Italy	Withdrew					(France) Paris
2028	13 September 2017	Los Angeles	United States	Unanimous					(United States) Los Angeles
2032	21 July 2021	Brisbane	Australia	72 Yes, 5 No, 3 Abstention (93.5% of valid votes)					(Australia) Brisbane
2032	21 July 2021	Ahmedabad	India	Did not advance to targeted dialogue phase					(Australia) Brisbane
2032	21 July 2021	Jakarta	Indonesia	Did not advance to targeted dialogue phase					(Australia) Brisbane
2032	21 July 2021	Rhine-Ruhr	Germany	Did not advance to targeted dialogue phase					(Australia) Brisbane
2032	21 July 2021	Doha	Qatar	Did not advance to targeted dialogue phase					(Australia) Brisbane
2032	21 July 2021	Madrid	Spain	Did not advance to targeted dialogue phase					(Australia) Brisbane
2036	2029	Ahmedabad	India	TBA					
2036	2029	Budapest	Hungary	TBA					
2036	2029	Doha	Qatar	TBA					
2036	2029	Durban	South Africa	TBA					
2036	2029	Istanbul	Turkey	TBA					
2036	2029	Munich	Germany	TBA					
2036	2029	Seoul and North Jeolla Province	South Korea	TBA					

== By city ==
The following is a list of cities' bids. It lists the country, city, and year for which failed, withdrawn, and successful bids were submitted. Parentheses indicate that the city was awarded the Games without a bidding process. A dagger (†) indicates that the city was awarded the Games, but that they were ultimately not held in the city, because the Games were either canceled or moved. An asterisk (*) indicates that the bid was not shortlisted. A double asterisk (**) indicates that the bid was withdrawn.

Country	City	Potential/failed/withdrawn bids	Successful bids
Argentina	Buenos Aires	1936, 1956, 1968, 2004	—
Australia	Brisbane	1992	2032
Australia	Hobart	2020	—
Australia	Melbourne	1996	1956
Australia	Sydney	—	2000
Austria	Vienna	1964	—
Azerbaijan	Baku	2016*, 2020*	—
Belgium	Antwerp	—	1920
Belgium	Brussels	1916, 1960, 1964	—
Brazil	Brasília	2000**	—
Brazil	Rio de Janeiro	1936, 2004*, 2012*	2016
Canada	Montreal	1944, 1956, 1972	1976
Canada	Toronto	1996, 2008	—
China	Beijing	2000	2008
Cuba	Havana	1920, 2008*, 2012*	—
Czech Republic/ Czechoslovakia	Prague	1924, 2016*	—
Egypt	Alexandria	1916, 1936	—
Egypt	Cairo	2008*	—
Finland	Helsinki	1936, 1944	1940† 1952
France	Lille	2004*	—
France	Lyon	1920, 1968	—
France	Paris	1992, 2008, 2012	1900, 1924, 2024
Germany	Berlin	1908, 2000	1916†, 1936
Germany	Cologne	1936	—
Germany	Frankfurt	1936	—
Germany	Hamburg	2024**	—
Germany	Leipzig	2012*	—
Germany	Munich	2036	1972
Germany	Nuremberg	1936	—
Great Britain	Birmingham	1992	—
Great Britain	London	—	1908, 1944†, 1948, 2012
Great Britain	Manchester	1996, 2000	—
Greece	Athens	1944, 1952, 1996	1896, 2004
Hungary/ Austria-Hungary	Budapest	1916, 1920, 1936, 1944, 1960, 2024**, 2036	—
India	Ahmedabad	2032, 2036	—
Indonesia	Jakarta	2032	—
Ireland	Dublin	1936	—
Italy	Milan	1908, 2000**	—
Italy	Rome	1924, 1936, 1944, 2004, 2020**, 2024**	1908†, 1960
Japan	Nagoya	1988	—
Japan	Osaka	2008	—
Japan	Tokyo	1960, 2016	1940†, 1964, 2020
Malaysia	Kuala Lumpur	2008*	—
Mexico	Mexico City	1956, 1960	1968
Netherlands	Amsterdam	1916, 1920, 1924, 1952, 1992	1928
Puerto Rico	San Juan	2004*	—
Qatar	Doha	2016*, 2020*, 2036	—
Russia/Soviet Union	Moscow	1976, 2012	1980
Russia/Soviet Union	Saint Petersburg	2004*	—
South Africa	Cape Town	2004	—
South Africa	Durban	2036	—
South Korea	Seoul	—	1988
South Korea	Seoul and North Jeolla Province	2036	—
Spain	Barcelona	1936	1992
Spain	Madrid	1972, 2012, 2016, 2020	—
Spain	Seville	2004*, 2008*	—
Sweden	Stockholm	1952, 2004	1912, 1956
Switzerland	Lausanne	1936, 1944, 1948, 1952, 1960	—
Thailand	Bangkok	2008*	—
Turkey	Istanbul	2000, 2004*, 2008, 2012*, 2020, 2036	—
United States	Atlanta	1920	1996
United States	Baltimore	1948	—
United States	Boston	2024	—
United States	Chicago	1952, 1956, 2016	1904†
United States	Cleveland	1916, 1920	—
United States	Detroit	1944, 1952, 1956, 1960, 1964, 1968, 1972	—
United States	Los Angeles	1924, 1928, 1948, 1952, 1956, 1976, 1980, 2024**	1932, 1984, 2028
United States	Minneapolis	1948, 1952, 1956	—
United States	New York City	2012	—
United States	Philadelphia	1920, 1948, 1952, 1956	—
United States	San Francisco	1956	—
United States	St. Louis	—	1904
United States	Washington, D.C.	2024	—
Uzbekistan	Tashkent	2000**	—
Yugoslavia/Serbia	Belgrade	1992, 1996	—

== By country ==
The following is a list of bids submitted by each national Olympic committee, listing the country and years it bid. Only countries that have submitted bids from multiple cities are included. Successful bids are in boldface. A parenthesis indicates that the city was awarded the games without a bidding process. A dagger (†) indicates that the city was awarded the games, but that they were ultimately not held in the city, either because the games were cancelled or moved.

Country	Years
Australia	**1956**, 1992, 1996, **2000**, 2020, **2032**
Belgium	1916, **1920**, 1960, 1964
Brazil	1936, 2000, 2004, 2012, **2016**
Canada	1944, 1956 1972, **1976**, 1996, 2008
Egypt	1916, 1936, 2008
France	**1900**, 1920, **1924**, 1968, 1992, 2004, 2008, 2012, **2024**
Germany	1908, **1916**†, **1936**, **1972**, 2000, 2012
Great Britain	**1908**, **1944**†, **1948**, 1992, 1996, 2000, **2012**
Italy	**1908**†, 1924, 1936, 1944, **1960**, 2000, 2004, 2020, 2024
Japan	**1940**†, 1960, **1964**, 1988, 2008, 2016, **2020**
The Netherlands	1920, 1924, **1928**, 1952, 1992
Russia/Soviet Union	1976, **1980**, 2004, 2012
Spain	1936, 1972, **1992**, 2004, 2008, 2012, 2016, 2020
United States	**1904**, 1916, 1920, 1924, 1928, **1932**, 1944, 1948, 1952, 1956, 1960, 1964, 1968, 1972, 1976, 1980, **1984**, **1996**, 2012, 2016, 2024, **2028**

== See also ==
- Bids for Olympic Games
- List of bids for the Winter Olympics
