= San Francisco bid for the 2016 Summer Olympics =

Bids for the 2016 Summer Olympics
Overview
- Games of the XXXI Olympiad
- Winner: Rio de Janeiro; Runner-up: Madrid; Shortlist: Chicago · Madrid · Rio de Janeiro · Tokyo

Details
- City: San Francisco, United States
- NOC: United States Olympic Committee (USOC)

Previous Games hosted
- None

Decision
- Result: After successfully making the USOC shortlist, San Francisco dropped the bid due to a lack of funding.

San Francisco was one of the cities vying to be the official United States bid for the 2016 Summer Olympics. Like the Chicago and Los Angeles bids for the 2016 Summer Olympics, San Francisco and the entire San Francisco Bay Area in California touted a compact but regional-participatory focus for its bid, expressing an interest in developing planning partnerships with a large number of neighboring large cities. Mayor of San Francisco Gavin Newsom announced the bid on September 12, 2005. After failure to secure a venue for use as the main stadium, the bid was withdrawn on November 13, 2006.

San Francisco also bid for the 2012 Summer Olympics, but came in second place to New York City during the national bidding process, making the 2016 bid their second unsuccessful bid for the Summer Olympics. The San Francisco 2012 bid organizers offered a concept called the "Ring of Gold" which took advantage of existing athletic venues from as far as Sacramento but revolved around four compact clusters near public transportation hubs: San Francisco; Palo Alto; San Jose and Santa Clara; Oakland and Berkeley.

Newsom announced on July 11, 2006, that the new bid would be centered on a proposed new San Francisco 49ers stadium in the property on which Candlestick Park was home to at the time. At the same time, he stated that the Olympic Village would be constructed at Hunters Point and that it would be converted into affordable housing following the games. This new Olympic stadium would be necessary as Stanford Stadium, the originally planned venue for athletics and the ceremonies for the 2012 bid, has been replaced by a smaller football stadium.

== Bid history ==
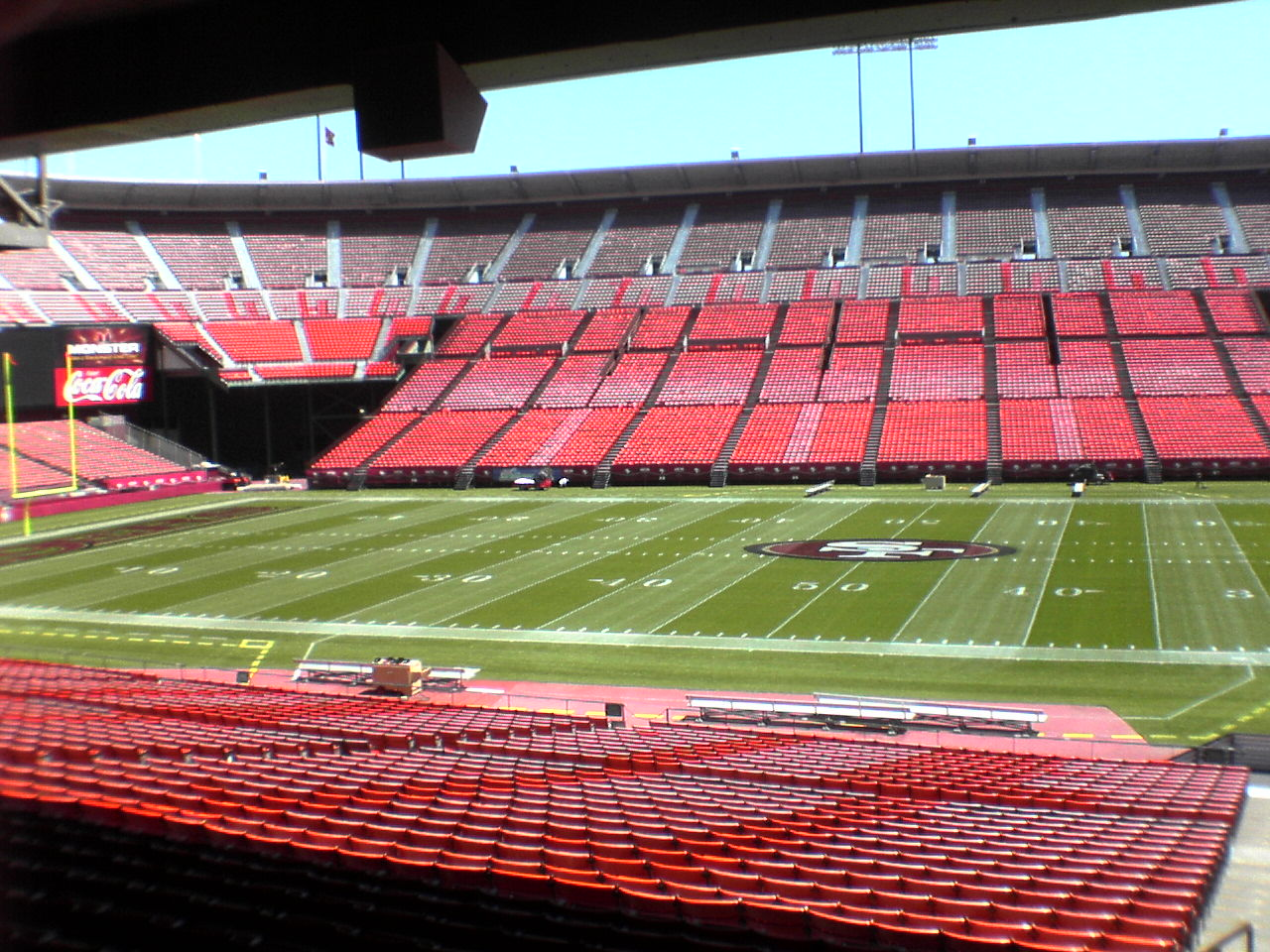
Candlestick Park, built in 1960, would likely have been replaced by a new stadium for the Olympics.

On July 26, 2006, the USOC officially named San Francisco, Los Angeles and Chicago as the three US finalists for the 2016 Olympics, dropping Philadelphia and Houston.

On September 22, 2006, San Francisco submitted a report responding to the USOC questionnaire that was distributed to the remaining three U.S. candidate cities. On the same day, San Francisco 2016 issued a press release announcing the design of a new stadium for both the 49ers and the Olympics/Paralympics. The design involves conversion of the football stadium to one including a 400-meter track by elevating the playing field, and also includes provision for expanded seating capacity for events such as the Olympics and Super Bowl.

On November 9, 2006, the San Francisco 49ers ended negotiations with the city of San Francisco for the development of a new football stadium that would also be used as the centerpiece of the 2016 Olympics. The 49ers would eventually move to nearby city Santa Clara. Bid organizers would have had to create a new plan for a central stadium if the 49ers relocated.

=== Termination of bid ===
On November 13, 2006, San Francisco withdrew its bid from the national selection process. Scott Givens, speaking for the bid committee, cited a "damaged reputation" due to failed negotiations surrounding the 49ers' stadium.

Ultimately, Chicago was elected by the USOC to be the U.S. bid city for 2016. Chicago lost their bid in the first round to the eventual final winner, Rio de Janeiro, when the IOC selected the host city. Nearly eight years later, Los Angeles secured the right to host the 2028 Summer Olympics.

== See also ==
- United States bids for the Olympic Games
