= Japanese Olympics =

Japanese Olympics may refer to:

- Japan at the Olympics
- 1940 Summer Olympics, awarded to Tokyo, moved to Helsinki first, then cancelled due to World War II
- 1964 Summer Olympics, held in Tokyo, Japan
- 1972 Winter Olympics, held in Sapporo, Japan
- 1998 Winter Olympics, held in Nagano, Japan
- Tokyo bid for the 2016 Summer Olympics
- 2020 Summer Olympics, held in Tokyo, Japan
