= Doha bid for the 2016 Summer Olympics =

Bids for the 2016 Summer Olympics and Paralympics
Overview
- Games of the XXXI Olympiad; XV Paralympic Games

- Winner: Rio de Janeiro; Runner-up: Madrid; Shortlist: Tokyo · Chicago

Details
- City: Doha, Qatar
- NOC: Qatar Olympic Committee (QOC)

Evaluation
- IOC score: 6.9

Previous Games hosted
- None

Decision
- Result: Not shortlisted.

Doha, the capital city of Qatar, bid for the 2016 Summer Olympics. It was one of two cities in the Arab World, along with Cairo, Egypt to mount a serious bid.

Doha's bid was eliminated from consideration when it failed to make the Candidate city shortlist on June 4, 2008.

Had Doha been chosen to host the games, they would have been held from 14 to 30 October. The Paralympics would have been held from 9 to 21 November.

== Bid details ==
Hassan Ali Bin Ali was named the chairman of the Doha 2016 Olympic Bid Committee. The bid was officially announced October 25, 2007 at a festival on the Doha corniche. It was only the second serious bid from the Arab World (after Cairo's bid for the 2008 games), and pundits speculated that Doha's chances of being shortlisted were improved for that reason. More than 1,000 banners and billboards featuring children (future athletes) promoted the bid in Doha, and Doha organized a Youth Ambassador Program designed to reach out with youthful hope and understanding. Qataris aimed to highlight the future of the country's youth by engaging and inspiring them to better understand the wider world, and for the youth of the rest of the world to gain a true picture of Arab culture and hospitality. US$48 million was budgeted to secure the games. ($44 million from the government)

The centerpiece of the bid was the expansion of the Aspire Zone sports center, which also houses many other facilities. The Aspire Zone hosted the 2006 Asian Games. Doha is also planning a new paralympic stadium, although it is uncertain if it will still be constructed since the end of the bid. The Qatar government committed to full financial guarantees that will cover any cost overruns. With sport as a raison d'etre, Qatar has invested in multimillion-dollar projects to upgrade Doha's infrastructure to premium international standards.

The bid had support from the Gulf Cooperation Council, solidifying regional support from the neighboring states of Bahrain, Kuwait, Oman, Saudi Arabia, and the United Arab Emirates. Bid leader Bin Ali stated, "Our aim is to build support for the bid which will be a bid that the whole Arab world can be proud of." 86% of people in Doha City and region support the Olympic bid and 95% of residents were aware of the bid, matching most of the other bid cities.

== Venues ==
The Qataris planned to utilize 70% pre-existing venues, most from the 2006 Asian Games. Six venues would be temporary and four will require new construction. Hassan plans to leave legacy buildings with a new Olympic Village and Media Center. Also, much new construction as part of the Qatar long-term development plan will result.

The Olympic Village was to be a US$1.94 billion 67-hectare development project designed for up to 18,000 athletes. The complex will form the shape of a dove.

=== Aspire Zone (Doha Sports City) ===
Aspire Zone is (approximately) a 240ha precinct that houses an international standard sport stadium, medical facilities, education services and sport academy, mosque, sports club, retail areas and parklands. There are also residential and hotel facilities. It is located approximately 8 km from Doha's Central Business District. Aspire Zone is represented with strong landmarks that will be iconic in their design and function.

=== Khalifa International Stadium ===
Khalifa Stadium is well-tailored to host major sports events of international standard, particularly football (soccer) and athletics. Khalifa Stadium was built in 1976 to seat 20,000. For the 2006 Asian Games, it was expanded to seat 50,000. It will need to be further expanded to meet the Olympic minimum of 60,000. It is linked to a warm-up field. An arch crowns the stadium, which also has a partial roof covering.

=== Aspire Sports Hall ===
The ASPIRE Sports Hall is multi-purpose sports hall with a wide range of corollaries. The sports hall features a gymnasium with an audience seating capacity of 200 persons, judo and karate area with a viewer's seating capacity of 150 persons, a fencing hall with a spectators seating capacity of 150 persons, a table tennis hall with squash court with an audience seating capacity of 500 persons, Olympic swimming and diving pools, a football court with a seating capacity of 200 persons and a host of other amenities. The total seating capacity of the sports hall is 3000. The support services include restaurants, changing rooms, cafeterias, shops museum, and technical support areas etc.

=== Hamad Aquatic Centre ===
The Hamad Aquatic Centre was expanded to offer ultra-modern facilities for water sports. The aquatic complex presents extensive facilities for swimming, diving, synchronized swimming and water polo.

=== Women's Sports Indoor Hall ===
This Women's Sports Hall is designed to provide indoor facilities for basketball, handball, and volleyball, etc. The size of court is around 30X50m with a height of 28 m. The sports hall does have a gallery to accommodate 2000 viewers and additional seating for about 500 persons.

=== Aspire Tower ===
The 300 m-high Aspire Zone Tower, is the tallest building in Qatar. Finished in 2007, the skeleton of the structure is clad in combination of glazing panels and architectural stainless steel mesh, which has been accentuated by state-of-the-art facade lighting. The tower hosts a hotel, restaurant, conference center, and sports museum. This iconic structure crowned by a steel parabolic lattice structure that will be a backdrop for the 8 to 10 meter high gas flame torch, representing the largest Olympic flame in history.

== Transport Infrastructure ==
The Qatari government has placed huge investment into developing a local transportation network and to improving accessibility between Qatar and the outside world by land, air and sea. Over the past few years, a great deal has been achieved in terms of building ports, airports and roads, with more under construction or planned.

With the imminent expansion of Qatar Airways, the country is building the New Doha International Airport, capable of handling 50 million passengers a year when it is completed in 2015. The New Doha International Airport is being constructed four kilometres from the existing one, on a 5,400-acre (22 km^{2}) site. The current airport handles around 9 million passengers per year, whereas the new airport will be designed to handle 12.5 million per year. The old airport will be remodeled as well.

Although there is currently no railway network in Qatar, plans are under way, in particular as part of the construction of the new city of Lusail. Lusail's plans include both an underground and aboveground train network, which will be fully integrated with a new rail system in Doha itself. In addition, it plans to develop a new water-taxi service to run along the Doha coastline.

Public transport in Qatar made a major leap forward in 2004 with the launch of The Qatar Transport Company, more commonly known by its Arabic name "Mowasalat". This is a government-owned bus, taxi and limousine service. The Bid Committee is also advocating the use of a range of battery powered taxis and buses in an effort to cut air pollution. Qatar would have the region's first environmentally friendly public transport system. The Chinese manufacturing company Kinglong is currently developing the prototypes for the vehicles.

== Accommodations ==
The Qatari hotel industry has made impressive progress in the past few years, capitalizing on the country's new role as a key business destination, hosting numerous international conferences and forums. The hotel industry has also benefited from the Qatari government's ongoing campaign to boost tourism to the country.

Qatar Tourism Authority (QTA) and Qatar National Hotels Company (QNHC) have set up a number of tourist facilities, recreational centers, exhibition halls, luxurious hotels, shopping centers, sports centers and museums.

== Logo and slogan ==
The logo's design represents the blossoming of the hopes and aspirations of Qatar, rooted in the rich heritage of the country. The Aldahma, the 'Flower of the Spring', was chosen to represent the vital and energetic spirit of the season. The Aldahma's natural habitat in the sands of the desert draws a parallel with the vibrant and colourful life flourishing in the State of Qatar. The calligraphy strokes making the words 'Doha 2016' are a unique manipulation of the traditional organic Henna patterns that women use to adorn their hands and arms as part of social and holiday celebrations. The interaction between the Arabic calligraphy and the English type is an interpretation of modernity. The logo was created by students at the Virginia Commonwealth University School of the Arts in Qatar (VCUQ).

The Doha 2016 Slogan was "Celebrating Change" (Arabic: الاحتفال بالتغيير).

== Outlook and conclusion ==
Doha is emerging as a prominent economic center of the Arab World, which has never hosted the Olympics before; this makes the bid similar to Rio's and Baku's bids, which would have been the first to host the games in their respective regions. In 2006, Doha successfully hosted the very well regarded 2006 Asian Games, the centerpiece being its sports city named Aspire Zone. Although it would need expansion with new arenas and stadiums, the overall quality of the facilities is very high. Doha is also a modern city which is currently undergoing a flurry of activity, expanding its number of hotels and road networks to international standards. An oil rich nation, Qatar should have no trouble funding the games.

Some negative factors included the hot temperatures in Doha in the summer (up to 45 °C), which would be difficult for the athletes and spectators. Doha proposed to host the games in mid to late October. While strictly outside the IOC's parameters, late games are not without precedent. The, 1964, Tokyo Games and the Mexico City Games were held in October, the Sydney Games and the Seoul Games were held in September and October, the Melbourne Games were held in November and December. The Paralympics would then be held in November. The Qataris promoted a message of peace with their bid, and while Qatar is a stable country, greater regional concerns over safety and terrorism may have hampered votes.

The overall small size of Doha and Qatar (330,000 and 960,000 respectively) would have made it one of the smallest locations in modern history to host the games. Also, Qatar has a short "sports legacy" when compared to other bidding countries,. Despite this, the IOC gave Doha the same number of points as Chicago did in the applicant round.

Doha's bid ended on June 4, 2008, when it failed to make the Candidate city shortlist. Doha was widely regarded as a wildcard candidate which had true potential to host. Ultimately, the IOC went with a shortlist of four candidates. In August 2011, Doha announced it would be bidding for the 2020 Summer Olympics however Doha failed to become a Candidate City for the 2020 Games. Following Doha's failure to secure as a candidate city list for the Olympics, Qatar has successfully won the hosting rights for the 2022 FIFA World Cup, with four stadiums being held in Doha area and surroundings, including Khalifa International Stadium.

== Future Sport Events ==
One of the most active cities in its region in terms of sporting events, Doha has already been chosen to host some significant future events:

- 2010 Gymnasiad
- 2011 Asian Indoor Games
- 2011 AFC Asian Cup
- 2022 FIFA World Cup

Doha and Qatar have also bid, or are planning to bid for numerous other events, which includes the 123rd IOC Session.

== See also ==
- Doha bid for the 2020 Summer Olympics
