= Prague bid for the 2016 Summer Olympics =

Bids for the 2016 Summer Olympics and Paralympics
Overview
- Games of the XXXI Olympiad; XV Paralympic Games
- Winner: Rio de Janeiro; Runner-up: Madrid; Shortlist: Tokyo · Chicago

Details
- City: Prague, Czech Republic
- NOC: Czech Olympic Committee

Evaluation
- IOC score: 5.3

Previous Games hosted
- None • Bid for 1924

Decision
- Result: Not shortlisted.

Prague, the capital city of the Czech Republic, bid for the 2016 Summer Olympics. Prague's bid was considered a trial bid to warm up for future Olympic campaigns. Prague's bid came to an end on 4 June 2008, when it failed to make the Candidate city shortlist.

After initial enthusiasm, Prague's bid became troubled, and the city considered canceling their bid. Nevertheless, the government went forward with its bid to become an applicant city on 14 January 2008.

If it had been chosen, Prague would have staged the Games between 29 July and 14 August. The subsequent Paralympics were to be held between 1 and 13 September.

== Bid Details ==
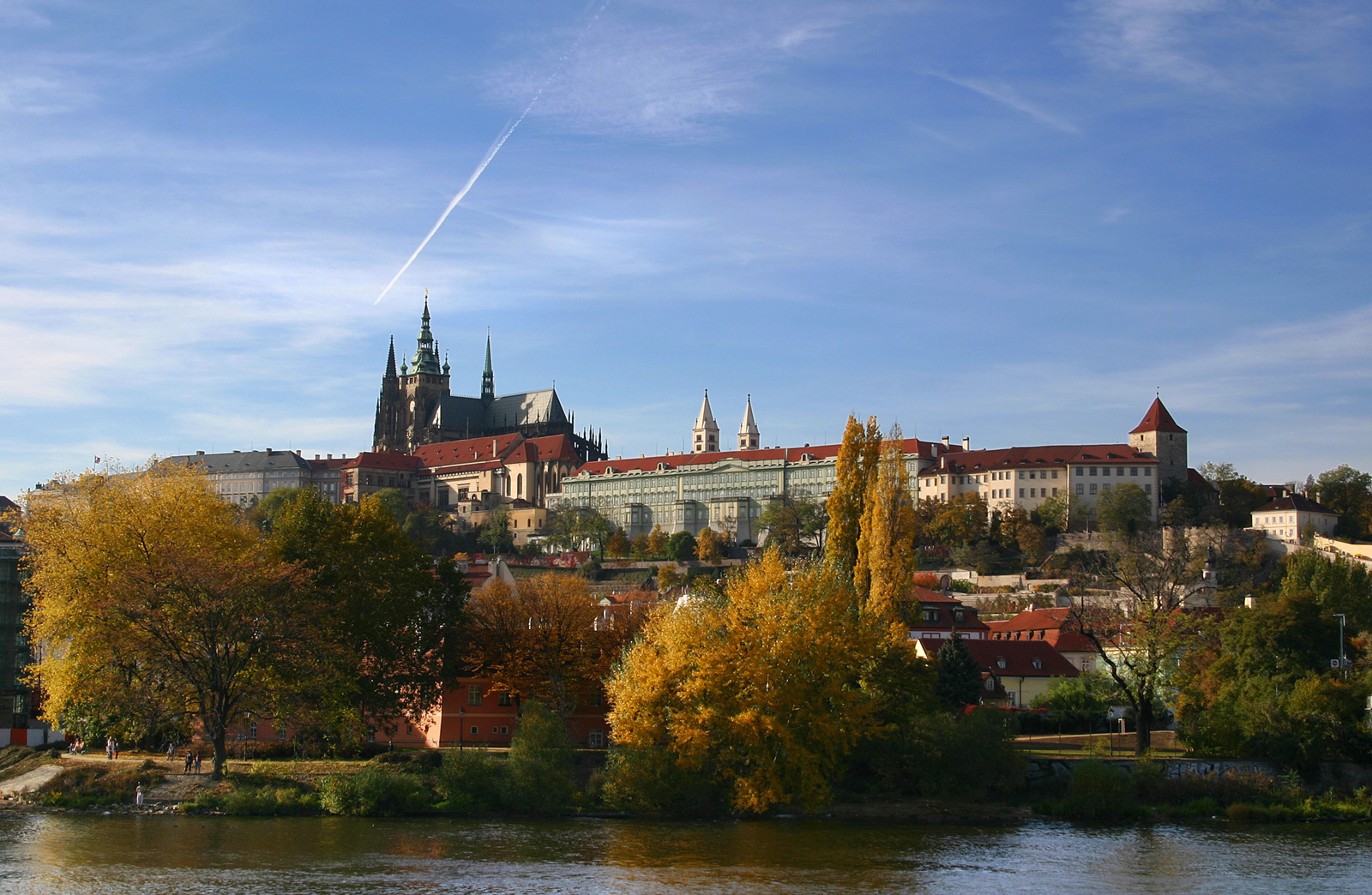
View of Prague

On 22 March 2007 Prague confirmed its bid when the Prague Assembly voted 53-10-3 in support of launching an official bid. Tomas Petera was the head of the Praha Olympijska (Olympic Prague) company.

This was the third try by Prague and the Czech Republic to host the Olympic Games. Previously Prague placed a bid for 1924 Summer Olympics which was won by Paris and planned a bid for 1980 Summer Olympics but Warsaw Pact invasion and normalization put an end to these plans, with Hotel Olympik (proposed as part of the Olympic Village) being the sole venue built; the Olympics were hosted by Moscow. Useful recent experience includes the recent hosting the 2004 Men's World Ice Hockey Championships.

The Czech Republic (including Moravia, Silesia and Bohemia) has a strong sports legacy, which appeals to the IOC. They have attended every games except the Athens 1896 Games and the Los Angeles 1984 Games. The Czechs have been especially proficient in gymnastics, and for winter sports, ice hockey. The current decathlon world champion is Czech Roman Šebrle, who as tradition dictates, holds the title of "World's Greatest Athlete" and who was identified to be a potential face of the Games.

Prague is known as one of the most beautiful cities in Europe, and as a popular tourist destination, it holds many of the cultural aspects that appeal to the IOC. The bid book indicates around 38,000 hotel rooms are planned by 2016, but this amount is short of IOC expectations and is far behind competing bids.

Prague allocated 45 million crowns to the Olympic movement for studies, advertisements, and opinion polls. The bid budget of US$22 million allotted for the application and candidacy phase was roughly half that of other bids.

=== Venues ===
The motto of the third nomination is Olympic Games for the Czech Republic as it should take place in other cities across the country as well. The IOC has tended to prefer, however, more compact bids. The Czech Olympic Committee plans to develop 130 sport centres in 75 cities in the process of Olympic Games candidature.

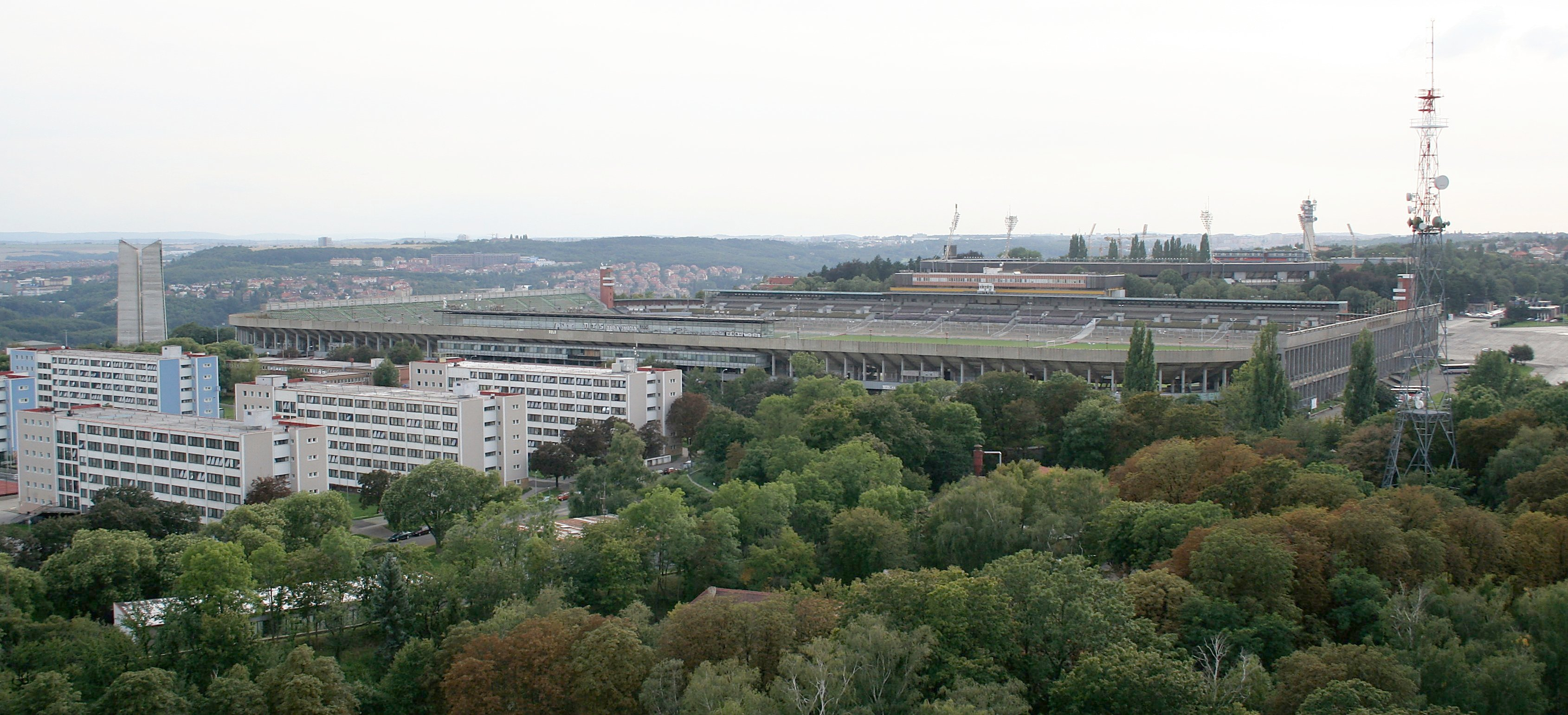
Strahov Stadium, a potential site of the bid.

When Prague revealed its bid book, it moved to a more compact concept to hold the Games in the heart of the city with venues close together - most not more than 20 minutes from each other or from the Old Town Centre of Prague. Three main clusters were organized with the Olympic park at the center. Five venues are already built and ready, 12 would need upgrades and nine permanent new venues would have been constructed with an additional seven venues being temporary for the Games only.

Specifically, three sport centers were to be built – a velodrome for cyclists in Prague or Brno; a natatorium that would be constructed from the existing Prague-Šutka Aquapark; and the major Olympic complex to be built on the outskirts of Prague in Letňany. Five circular children's pools were to be built to symbolically represent the Olympic rings. As Prague is land-locked, yachting will be in Lipno, rowing and canoeing in Racice, and slalom in Troja. One major stadium already in place is the modern Sazka Arena, which would host gymnastics. There are plans to rebuild the area around the huge and underutilized Strahov Stadium as an Olympic village.

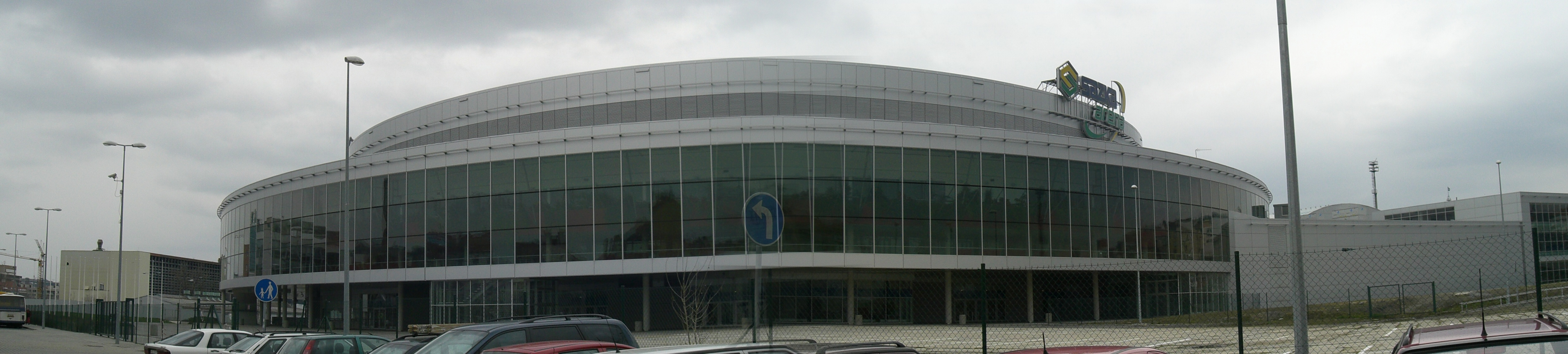
Sazka Arena, planned for gymnastics.

In response to presidential concerns over white elephant venues after the Games (such as Athens' unused baseball stadium), officials stressed the Games would not bring dozens of new sporting facilities to Prague. Many existing facilities would be refurbished, most Olympic sites would be just temporary, with “only about 30 percent remain[ing] permanent.” Even the possible main Olympic stadium in Letňany would be developed in such a way that it could later be transformed into part of a convention center.

=== Funding and political support ===
The center of the bid was planned to use a new $348 million Olympic Stadium and the Olympic village to be financed with both private and public funds. Revenues from the Games were projected at US$969 million, down from the 2004 estimates. Per a 2004 study, the budget for the games was estimated to reach 136 billion crowns (US$7.5 billion) and profit 25 billion crowns (US$1.3 billion). An additional 490 billion crowns (US$27 billion) would need to be invested in infrastructure. A newer study indicates the government will spend US$5.03 billion for the Games, of which $1.4 billion would be expected to come from the national budget. Infrastructure costs will require another $28 billion.

Politically, Prague's bid failed to garner widespread support from mayors of smaller towns who fear that the infrastructure investment in Prague will hamper investment in their regions. Czech President Václav Klaus questioned the bid, doubting the ability to bring profit to the country. A public opinion poll in October 2007 mustered a quite low 50% support. This was up 8% from an earlier poll in May 2007. Other bid cities have support in the 70s-80s percent range except Tokyo which is around 60% and Baku which is over 90%.

In December 2007, Tomas Petera suggested the possibility of Prague cancelling its bid, citing uncertainty over political guarantees because of a vacancy in the Sports and Education ministry linked to a government reshuffle. Government officials later confirmed stated legal guarantees to protect foreign athletes’ safety. However, no ties to financial obligations were confirmed which is a requirement of a successful bid. In February 2008, Czech Premier Mirek Topolánek emphatically stated Prague's bid will not get financial guarantees from the government, even if the city makes the short list of contenders, effectively ending the campaign. Even then, Prague was still officially in the running for the games.

In March 2008, the item was still under contention when local press highlighted that the official questionnaire claims it would receive the equivalent of $5.2 million from the Czech government, but failed to mention that the government provided only legal guarantees. A spokesman for the Olympic promotion company said the figures are based on a financial study and are nothing but a possibility under consideration. He said the costs of the candidacy would be covered by Prague.

=== Logo ===
The Prague logo represents a branch from a laurel wreath, both a traditional sign of victory and celebration as well as a reward in the ancient Olympic Games (and featured in the 2004 Summer Olympics in Athens, Greece) and ribbons in the Olympic colors. Initially, the number "2016" formed the actual leaves. However, the IOC asked them to modify the design for reading clarity.

== Conclusion of bid ==
As expected, Prague did not make the shortlist of Candidate cities in June 2008.

Prague was considered to be a long-shot given several factors, such as Prague's lack of stadia and other important Olympic sports infrastructure, wavering political support, funding issues, and as London is already hosting the 2012 Summer Olympics, the IOC is unlikely to award back-to-back Summer Olympic Games to the same continent, (although Madrid, Spain did advance to the shortlist). Prague acknowledged outright that this bid was a preparation for future bids.
