= Hamburg bid for the 2024 Summer Olympics =

Bids for the 2024 Summer Olympics and Paralympics
Overview
- Games of the XXXIII Olympiad; XVII Paralympic Games

Details
- City: Hamburg, Germany
- NOC: German Olympic Sports Federation

Previous Games hosted

The Hamburg bid for the 2024 Summer Olympics (Low Saxon: Hamborg 2024) was a cancelled bid of Hamburg to host the 2024 Summer Olympics.

A referendum on 29 November 2015 rejected the bid.

== Bid history ==
In October 2012, Thomas Bach stated that Hamburg will apply for the 2024 Summer Olympics. Hamburg could combine the water based and the other non-water based games in a very small circle, due to its good location. Hamburg would host the games the first time and would therefore be preferred to Berlin.

On 16 March 2015, the National Olympic Committee (DOSB) proposed Hamburg to be the candidate city from Germany. On 21 March 2015, the DOSB's general assembly confirmed the decision to allow Hamburg to bid for the games.

In its 2024 bid, Hamburg re-used the logo and the slogan of their bid to host the 2012 Summer Olympics. The logo had a wave of water turning into a flame, referring to the water that is a defining aspect of Hamburg's cityscape and the Olympic flame. The slogan was "Feuer und Flamme", or "Fire and Flame", combining the Olympic flame with a German expression translating to "to be fire and flame for something", meaning to be very enthusiastic and/or excited about something. (West) Germany last hosted the 1972 Summer Olympics in Munich and also had recent experience with the success of the 1974 and 2006 World Cups, where Hamburg was one of the host cities.

On 13 April 2015, it was announced that Kiel would be Hamburg's venue for all sailing competitions.

== 2015 referendum ==
On 29 November 2015, Hamburg held a referendum on hosting the 2024 Summer Olympics; 51.6% of the voters said no.

=== Aftermath ===
The IOC designated Paris as the host of the 2024 Summer Olympics and Los Angeles as the host the 2028 Summer Olympics.

== See also ==
- Munich bid for the 2018 Winter Olympics
