= Bids for the 2016 Summer Olympics =

Bids for the 2016 Summer Olympics and Paralympics
Overview
- Games of the XXXI Olympiad; XV Paralympic Games
- Winner: Rio de Janeiro; Runner-up: Madrid; Shortlist: Tokyo · Chicago

Details
- Committee: IOC
- Election venue: Copenhagen; 121st IOC Session

Map of the bidding cities

Important dates
- First Bid: 13 September 2007
- Second bid: 14 January 2008
- Shortlist: 4 June 2008
- Decision: 2 October 2009

Decision
- Winner: Rio de Janeiro (66 votes)
- Runner-up: Madrid (32 votes)

Seven cities submitted bids for 2016 Summer Olympics and Paralympics on September 13, 2007, aiming to host the Games of the XXXI Olympiad. All of them were recognized by the International Olympic Committee (IOC) on September 14, 2007, becoming Applicant cities. Although several cities submitted to be in consideration to host the 2016 Olympics, including New York City and Los Angeles, on June 4, 2008, the IOC Executive Board shortlisted the four strongest bids to become Candidate cities. Those cities were Chicago, Madrid, Rio de Janeiro and Tokyo; the decisions were made during a meeting in Athens, Greece. The remaining Applicant cities—Baku, Doha and Prague—were eliminated.

The four Candidate cities were selected according to a detailed study of the Applicant Files received by the IOC Working Group on January 14, 2008. The four cities submitted the Candidature Files to the IOC on February 11, 2009. They were analyzed by the IOC Evaluation Commission, which made site inspections in Chicago (April 4–7, 2009), Tokyo (April 16–19, 2009), Rio de Janeiro (April 27 – May 2, 2009) and Madrid (May 5–8, 2009). Under the leadership of Nawal El Moutawakel, the Evaluation Commission released its report on September 2, 2009; one month prior to the election.

With the presence of the heads of state from all four Candidate cities, the 121st IOC Session took place in Copenhagen, Denmark, on October 2, 2009. Chicago began the presentations at Bella Center; followed by Tokyo, Rio de Janeiro and Madrid; which were attended by several celebrities such as the King of Spain, Oprah Winfrey and Pelé. Before the vote, the IOC Evaluation Commission presented its report to the Session. Chicago fell in the first round, followed by Tokyo, after the eligible IOC members have been asked to vote, in a three-round exhaustive ballot process.

Rio de Janeiro defeated Madrid in the final round by 66 votes over 32, winning the rights to host the 2016 Summer Olympics and Paralympics. Brazil would become the first lusophone country and Rio de Janeiro the first city in South America to host the Summer Olympics. The announcement was made by Jacques Rogge, president of the IOC, in a widely broadcast ceremony. The lengthy and intensive bidding process, considered to be one of the tightest in history, was marked by several controversies such as espionage, racism and opposition movements.

Out of the six cities that failed to be awarded the 2016 Olympics, four of them bid for the 2020 Summer Olympics. Baku, Doha, Madrid and Tokyo were official Applicant Cities, with Madrid and Tokyo advancing to become Candidate Cities and with Tokyo eventually being selected.

== Bidding process ==
The Olympic bidding process begins with the submission of a city's application to the International Olympic Committee (IOC) by its National Olympic Committee (NOC) and ends with the election of the host city by the members of the IOC during an ordinary session. The process is governed by the Olympic Charter, as stated in Chapter 5, Rule 34.

Since 1999, the process has consisted of two phases. During the first phase, which begins immediately after the bid submission deadline, the "applicant cities" are required to answer a questionnaire covering themes of importance to a successful Games organization. This information allows the IOC to analyze the cities' hosting capacities and the strengths and weaknesses of their plans. Following a detailed study of the submitted questionnaires and ensuing reports, the IOC Executive Board selects the cities that are qualified to proceed to the next phase. The second phase is the true candidature stage: the accepted applicant cities (from now on referred to as "candidate cities") are required to submit a second questionnaire in the form of an extended, more detailed, candidature file. These files are carefully studied by the IOC Evaluation Commission, a group composed of IOC members, representatives of international sport federations, NOCs, athletes, the International Paralympic Committee, and international experts in various fields. The members of the Evaluation Commission then make four-day inspection visits to each of the candidate cities, where they check the proposed venues and are briefed about details of the themes covered in the candidature file. The Evaluation Commission communicates the results of its inspections in a report sent to the IOC members up to one month before the electing IOC Session.

The IOC Session in which a host city is elected takes place in a country that did not submit an application to stage the Olympics. The election is made by the assembled active IOC members (excluding honorary and honor members), each possessing one vote. Members from countries that have a city taking part in the election cannot vote while the city is in the running. The voting is conducted in a succession of rounds until one bid achieves an absolute majority of votes; if this does not happen in the first round, the bid with the fewest votes is eliminated and another voting round begins. In the case of a tie for the lowest number of votes, a special runoff vote is carried out, with the winner proceeding to the next round. After each round, the eliminated bid is announced. Following the announcement of the host city, the successful bid delegation signs the "Host City Contract" with the IOC, which delegates the responsibilities of the Games organisation to the city and respective NOC.

=== Evaluation ===
==== Application phase ====
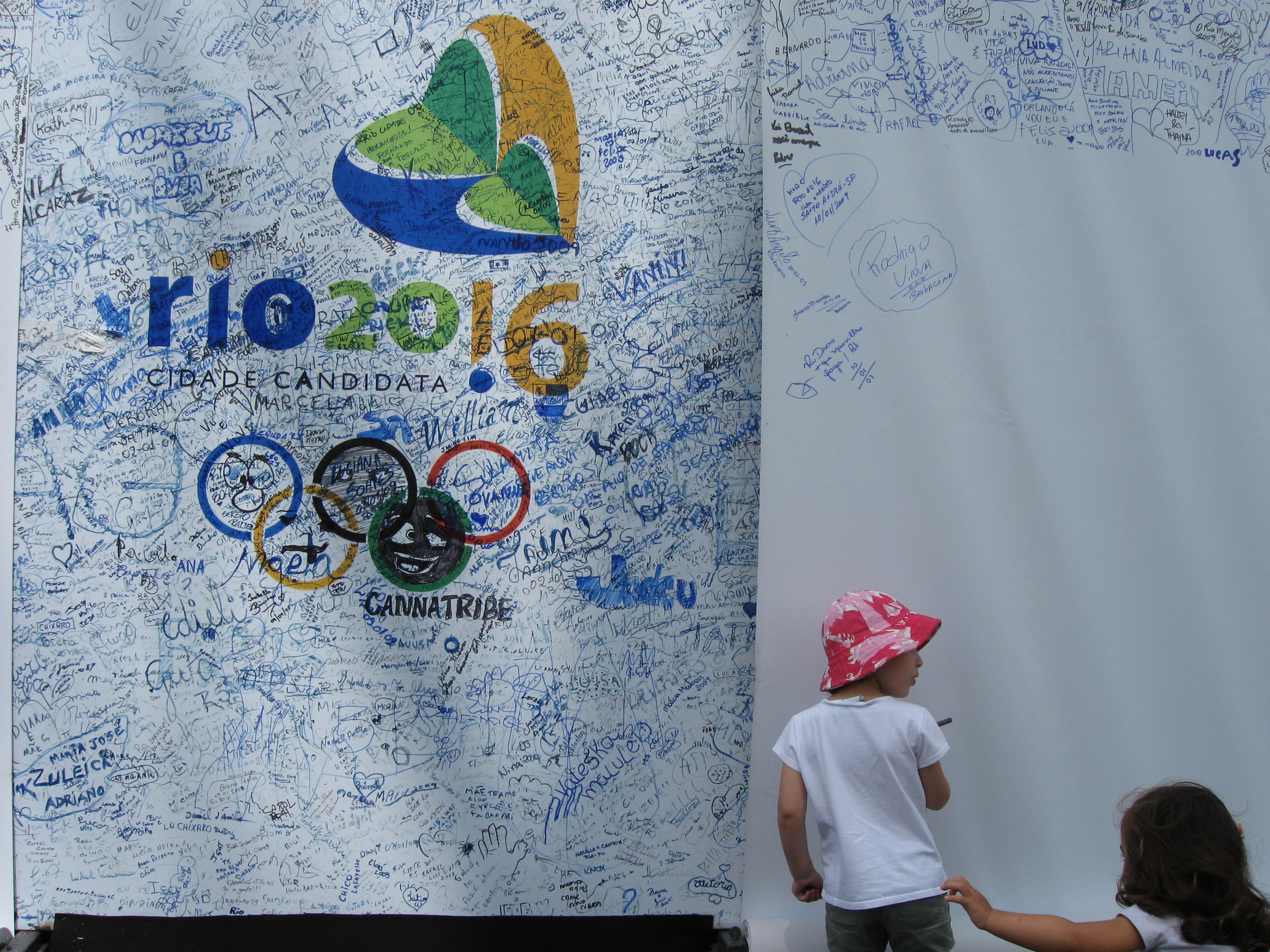
A young girl adds her signature in support of Rio de Janeiro's candidacy to host the 2016 Summer Olympics (January 2009).

The deadline to submit applications for the 2016 Summer Olympics was September 13, 2007. The seven cities that submitted bids before that date also met the January 14, 2008 deadline for submission of the first phase questionnaire. Through analysis of the questionnaires, the IOC gave a weighted-average score to each city based on the scores obtained in each of the questionnaire's eleven themes: political and social support, general infrastructure, sports venues, Olympic Village, environment, accommodation, transport, security, past experience, finance, and legacy. If a bid's score was higher than six (IOC's predefined benchmark score), the city was considered highly capable of hosting the Games; otherwise, its chances were very slim. On June 4, 2008, the IOC announced the cities accepted as candidates: Four of the five highest-rated applicants progressed to the next phase as official candidate cities. As stipulated, the IOC granted them the right to use the Olympic rings on their candidature emblem, together with a label identifying each as a Candidate City. The International Olympic Committee went against precedent when it selected Rio de Janeiro over Doha—a city which scored higher yet was eliminated from the field. Doha's weaknesses of a small population, lack of facilities, and Games dates outside of the IOC's desired window may have been too large an obstacle for the IOC to accept. Typically, the IOC selects all the top scoring bids which reach the established minimum benchmark.

The Working Group divided the Evaluation Report on eleven detailed themes and weightings: Government support, legal issues and public opinion (2); General infrastructure (5); Sports venues (4); Olympic Village(s) (3); Environmental conditions and impact (2); Accommodation (5); Transport concept (3); Safety and security (3); Experience from past sports events (2); Finance (3); and, Overall project and legacy (3). Weightings, varying between 1 and 5 (5 being the highest), were attributed by the Working Group to each criterion, reflecting the level of information requested of the Applicant Cities at this stage of the bid process, and the potential of achieving the level required for the organisation of the Olympic Games in the seven years' preparation time. The Working Group set the benchmark at 6 as minimum required grade (on a scale of 0 to 10). This grade was attributed by the Working Group to the main and sub-criteria for each Applicant City, reflecting the assessment of the Working Group (quality, number, location, concept, etc.).

Table of scores given by the IOC Working Group to assess the quality and feasibility of the 2016 Applicant cities
Criteria	Weight	Baku bid for the 2016 Summer Olympics		Chicago bid for the 2016 Summer Olympics		Doha bid for the 2016 Summer Olympics		Madrid bid for the 2016 Summer Olympics		Prague bid for the 2016 Summer Olympics		Rio de Janeiro bid for the 2016 Summer Olympics		Tokyo bid for the 2016 Summer Olympics	
Criteria	Weight	AZE		USA		QAT		ESP		CZE		BRA		JPN	
Criteria	Weight	Min	Max	Min	Max	Min	Max	Min	Max	Min	Max	Min	Max	Min	Max
Accommodation	5	2.6	4.8	9.4	9.8	5.5	7.7	7.8	8.8	5.1	5.8	5.5	6.4	9.6	10.0
Environmental conditions and impact	2	4.2	6.0	6.0	8.0	6.4	8.2	7.4	8.8	5.4	7.4	5.6	7.6	7.6	8.8
Experience from past sports events	2	3.8	6.4	5.4	8.0	6.0	7.6	7.2	8.2	4.4	6.4	6.6	7.9	6.0	8.0
Finance	3	4.8	6.4	6.5	8.0	6.7	8.6	6.5	8.5	4.8	6.7	6.0	7.7	7.0	8.5
General infrastructure	5	3.8	5.6	5.5	7.4	5.5	7.5	7.9	8.9	4.2	6.0	5.3	7.2	7.6	8.9
Government support, legal issues and public opinion	3	5.7	7.4	6.2	7.9	7.0	8.7	7.5	9.0	4.3	6.7	7.3	8.8	7.0	8.5
Olympic Village(s)	3	6.8	8.1	7.0	8.6	6.9	8.6	7.4	8.7	4.9	7.2	6.0	7.7	7.5	8.9
Overall project and legacy	3	3.0	5.0	5.0	8.0	5.0	7.0	8.0	9.0	4.0	5.0	5.5	8.0	7.0	9.0
Safety and security	3	4.4	5.8	7.1	8.2	5.5	7.1	7.1	7.9	4.4	6.1	4.6	7.0	7.9	9.0
Sports venues	4	3.2	5.6	5.8	7.2	6.8	8.2	7.9	8.8	5.0	6.3	5.8	7.4	6.9	8.7
Transport concept	3	6.0	8.5	5.3	7.8	6.5	8.3	8.0	9.0	4.8	7.0	5.5	7.5	7.5	8.5
Total average		4.3		7.0		6.9		8.1		5.3		6.4		8.3	

==== Candidature phase ====
Nawal El Moutawakel of Morocco headed the Evaluation Commission. She also chaired the evaluation commission for the 2012 Summer Olympics bids. Other members include Olympic Games Executive Director Gilbert Felli, IOC Member Ching-Kuo Wu from Chinese Taipei, IOC Member Craig Reedie from Great Britain, IOC Member Guy Drut from France, IOC Member Mounir Sabet from Egypt, IOC Member and Athletes' Commission Representative Alexander Popov from Russia, IOC Member and ASOIF Representative Els van Breda Vriesman from The Netherlands and IPC Representative Gregory Hartung from Australia.

The Commission made on-site inspections in the second quarter of 2009. visiting Chicago April 2 to 8, Tokyo April 14 to 20, Rio de Janeiro April 27 to May 3, and Madrid May 4 to 9. In a change from previous years, the commission's visits were extended from four days to seven. They issued a comprehensive technical appraisal for IOC members one month before the elections in October 2009.

=== Election ===
At the 121st IOC Session in Copenhagen, Denmark on October 2, 2009, final voting took place. The three ballots were held within a 15 minutes period, and although the first two ballots results were announced immediately, the third ballot result was announced only about one hour later. The final result and winner was announced as Rio de Janeiro at 16:49 UTC (6:49 pm in Copenhagen and 1:49 pm in Rio de Janeiro). The results were as shown:

=== 2016 host city election ballots results ===
City	NOC	Round 1	Round 2	Round 3	Ineligible members	
Rio de Janeiro	Brazil (COB)	26	46	66	Members from countries with candidate cities (7)	Other IOC members (4)
Madrid	Spain (COE)	28	29	32	Members from countries with candidate cities (7)	Other IOC members (4)
Tokyo	Japan (JOC)	22	20	—	(United States) DeFrantz; (United States) Easton; (Japan) Igaya; (Japan) Okano; (Brazil) Havelange; (Brazil) Nuzman; (Spain) Samaranch Jr.	(Belgium) Rogge (IOC President); (South Korea) Lee (suspended); (Guinea) Diallo (absent); (Finland) Koivu (absent)
Chicago	United States (USOC)	18	—	—	(United States) DeFrantz; (United States) Easton; (Japan) Igaya; (Japan) Okano; (Brazil) Havelange; (Brazil) Nuzman; (Spain) Samaranch Jr.	(Belgium) Rogge (IOC President); (South Korea) Lee (suspended); (Guinea) Diallo (absent); (Finland) Koivu (absent)
Venue	Vote details				(United States) DeFrantz; (United States) Easton; (Japan) Igaya; (Japan) Okano; (Brazil) Havelange; (Brazil) Nuzman; (Spain) Samaranch Jr.	(Belgium) Rogge (IOC President); (South Korea) Lee (suspended); (Guinea) Diallo (absent); (Finland) Koivu (absent)
Bella Center; 121st IOC Session; October 2, 2009 (Denmark) Copenhagen	Eligible members	95	97	99	(United States) DeFrantz; (United States) Easton; (Japan) Igaya; (Japan) Okano; (Brazil) Havelange; (Brazil) Nuzman; (Spain) Samaranch Jr.	(Belgium) Rogge (IOC President); (South Korea) Lee (suspended); (Guinea) Diallo (absent); (Finland) Koivu (absent)
Bella Center; 121st IOC Session; October 2, 2009 (Denmark) Copenhagen	Participants	94	96	98	(United States) DeFrantz; (United States) Easton; (Japan) Igaya; (Japan) Okano; (Brazil) Havelange; (Brazil) Nuzman; (Spain) Samaranch Jr.	(Belgium) Rogge (IOC President); (South Korea) Lee (suspended); (Guinea) Diallo (absent); (Finland) Koivu (absent)
Bella Center; 121st IOC Session; October 2, 2009 (Denmark) Copenhagen	Abstentions	0	1	0	(United States) DeFrantz; (United States) Easton; (Japan) Igaya; (Japan) Okano; (Brazil) Havelange; (Brazil) Nuzman; (Spain) Samaranch Jr.	(Belgium) Rogge (IOC President); (South Korea) Lee (suspended); (Guinea) Diallo (absent); (Finland) Koivu (absent)
Bella Center; 121st IOC Session; October 2, 2009 (Denmark) Copenhagen	Valid ballots	94	95	98	(United States) DeFrantz; (United States) Easton; (Japan) Igaya; (Japan) Okano; (Brazil) Havelange; (Brazil) Nuzman; (Spain) Samaranch Jr.	(Belgium) Rogge (IOC President); (South Korea) Lee (suspended); (Guinea) Diallo (absent); (Finland) Koivu (absent)

== Bidding cities ==
=== Candidate cities ===
City	Country	National Olympic Committee	Result
Rio de Janeiro	Brazil	Brazilian Olympic Committee (COB)	Winner
Main article: Rio de Janeiro bid for the 2016 Summer Olympics Rio de Janeiro was chosen by acclamation by the Brazilian Olympic Committee (BOC) as the national applicant city for the XXXI Olympiad on September 1, 2006, starting a process of ten years until the Olympics. This is the first time that the city has proceeded to the Candidature phase, after four failed attempts in 1936, 1940, 2004 and 2012. Rio would become the first Brazilian and South American city to host the games. Rio de Janeiro planned to perform all the competitions inside the city, bringing dynamics to the games and facilitating the athlete's interaction. There will be seven competition centers in four Olympic regions—Barra, Copacabana, Deodoro, and Maracanã— where football matches will be held in the cities of Belo Horizonte, Brasília, Salvador and São Paulo. The proposed dates range from August 5 to August 21 for the Summer Olympic Games, and September 7 (Independence Day of Brazil) to September 18 for the Summer Paralympic Games. Rio de Janeiro failed in the previous applications mainly by lack of infrastructure, security and experience in organization of international sporting events. Brazil hosted the 1950 FIFA World Cup, where Rio was one of the host cities and place of the final match, but the structures have been deteriorating over time despite several reforms. However, the XV Pan American Games, held in Rio de Janeiro between July 13 and July 29, 2007, changed the idea of failure of the city. The event was considered the best in history by the president of the Pan American Sports Organisation (PASO), Mario Vazquez Raña, during his speech at the closing ceremony. Brazil later organized the FIFA World Cup in 2014, adding more experience to Rio, which hosted the final match for the second time. According to the ROCOG, the entire city would to be transformed into a theater for the occasion. The compact footprint, complemented by Rio's topography, involves seven competition clusters in four Olympic zones—Barra, Copacabana, Deodoro, and Maracanã—all held within the city. At the heart of the concept is the Barra zone, located in one of the newer and fastest growing regions of the city, framed by mountains, beaches and lagoons. The logo was revealed on December 17, 2007, during the Brazil's Olympic Award ceremony at the Municipal Theater of Rio de Janeiro, and was selected by a jury from among four finalists. The BOC chose the Sugarloaf Mountain (Portuguese: Pão de Açucar), a prominent landmark of the city, as their symbol. This landscape results in a heart shape that, in its turn, represents the Brazilian's unquestionable passion and enthusiasm for sports.
Madrid	Spain	Spanish Olympic Committee (COE)	First runner-up
Main article: Madrid bid for the 2016 Summer Olympics The same day London was chosen for organizing the 2012 Summer Olympics, the mayor of Madrid spoke of an interest to make a bid for the 2016 games. Considering its strong showing in the 2012 bidding, one year later, the city council unanimously voted for the submission of a new bid. In May 2007, mayor Alberto Ruiz-Gallardón filed with the Spanish Olympic Committee (COE, Spanish: Comité Olímpico Español) as the only Spanish internal candidate for the Games. The Spanish Field Hockey Federation vice-chairwoman Mercedes Coghen was chosen as chairwoman of the project. Former IOC president Juan Antonio Samaranch offered his help in this new attempt. Madrid benefited from its strong reputation from the 2012 bid as well as having 85% of venues in place and many experiences hosting Olympic qualifying events. Later plans stressed two clusters of venues, one on the east side, the other along the Manzanares River. The bid was also popular with the Madrileños, boasting 85% support and 60% believing they could win the bid. One potential problem was that no continent has hosted successive Summer Games since the special circunstances who led Helsinki to host the 1952 Summer Olympics followed London as 1948 Summer Olympics host city. London was scheduled to host the 2012 Summer Olympics, and Athens, Greece fielded the 2004 Summer Olympics. Furthermore, the 2014 Winter Olympics are also slated for Europe in the Russian city of Sochi, and the 2006 Winter Olympics were held in Turin, Italy. Bid head Coghen pointed out, however, that the IOC chooses "cities, not continents". It was Madrid's second consecutive failure, after losing out to London for the 2012 Olympics, and later in 2020, marking the city's third failure. The bid logo is a coloured hand print called "Corle" welcoming citizens to Madrid. An "m" is hidden in the palm standing for Madrid. It was selected via a public contest.
Tokyo	Japan	Japanese Olympic Committee (JOC)	Second runner-up
Main article: Tokyo bid for the 2016 Summer Olympics The Japanese Olympic Committee (JOC) chose Tokyo over Fukuoka in August 2006. Tokyo has recent experience with the success of the 2002 FIFA World Cup, which Japan co-hosted with South Korea. Japan also has past Olympic experience as the host of the 1964 Games in Tokyo, the 1972 Winter Games in Sapporo, and the 1998 Winter Games in Nagano. Tokyo touted "the most compact and efficient Olympic Games ever" with a dramatic setting on the shores of Tokyo Bay. Similar to other past winning cities, Tokyo pledged to refurbish a run-down industrial area, and to reclaim land from the bay. Despite massive campaigning in trains, parks and street, Tokyo's public support trailed behind the other lead cities. It fell to 56% in May 2009, from 62% in December 2007 and 72% in March 2008. While Tokyo continued its attempts to popularize the bid in high-profile venues and events, such as the Tokyo Marathon, the Beijing Games were held nearby in 2008. Specifically, the voting only one year after Beijing perhaps interfered with Tokyo's bid. Tokyo's logo was a musubi, a traditional knot which signifies times of blessing, in this case using the Olympic colors. Tokyo was the second city eliminated, leaving Rio de Janeiro in the run-off against Madrid to host the 2016 Summer Olympics. Tokyo was later chosen as host of the 2020 Summer Olympics in 2013.
Chicago	United States	United States Olympic Committee (USOC)	Third runner-up
Main article: Chicago bid for the 2016 Summer Olympics On April 14, 2007, the United States Olympic Committee (USOC) chose Chicago to run in the 2016 Olympic bidding. Chicago was chosen to host the 1904 Summer Olympics but they would be held in St. Louis, to coincide with the 1904 World's Fair. The 1996 in Atlanta were the last summer Olympics to be hosted in North America. Chicago has an extensive public transit system, a wide range of venues, and a strong sports culture. The planned dramatic setting for Olympics on the shores of Lake Michigan, as well as the entirely urban experience were positive factors. Chicago is one of few cities in the United States to host professional men and women's hockey, baseball, basketball, soccer, and American football teams. Another benefit was the city's central location in the United States, since the Central Time Zone was well-suited to the North American television coverage for television networks and cable broadcasting, which in turn benefits NBC, the media company which pays the highest broadcasting rights to the IOC. Plans included a temporary Olympic Stadium in Washington Park on the city's South Side, a swimming venue on the West Side, and a number of events at McCormick Place convention center and the lakeshore as well as the Olympic Village just south of the Loop. However, soaring demolition costs to the hospital currently on the site would have required a new site for the village. 22 of the 27 Olympic venues would have been in four clusters within 15 km of the Olympic Village. Five new venues and eleven temporary venues would have been built for the games. The bid costs (US$49.3 million) were covered by the private sector. The bid was being promoted by Chicago-based media mogul Oprah Winfrey, Olympic champion Michael Phelps, NBA superstar and former Chicago Bulls player Michael Jordan, and by Chicago resident, U.S. President Barack Obama who attended the IOC vote in Copenhagen. However, local public support was smaller than other bidding cities and the city press ran articles against the bid. Chicago was reported by the media to be the strongest contender in terms of infrastructure, support, and money. However Chicago was ranked 3rd by an IOC evaluation report as to the technical aspect of their bid behind Tokyo and Madrid. Having received the fewest votes in the first round, Chicago was the first city eliminated from contention. This was seen as a major upset against the Chicago bid team. Eight years after Chicago losing the bid, Los Angeles was later won to host the 2028 Summer Olympics.

=== Applicant cities ===
City	Country	National Olympic Committee	Result
Baku	Azerbaijan	National Olympic Committee of the Azerbaijani Republic (AZMOC)	Not shortlisted
Main article: Baku bid for the 2016 Summer Olympics Azerbaijan's capital, Baku, announced its bid for the Olympics, with initial studies suggesting that the cost of hosting the 2016 Summer Olympics could be $20 billion. The capital of a petroleum rich nation with a booming economy, Baku had plenty of money to fund the games. The city's infrastructure had deteriorated since the breakup of the Soviet Union. In addition, there are three frozen political conflicts in the South Caucasus region. A lesser factor considered by the IOC is the host nation's sport legacy. Azerbaijan has been an independent nation only a short time, so its Olympic history is also short, sending teams since only 1996 and claiming only three gold medals so far. The Azerbaijani Organizing Committee established its bid committee in November 2007, installing first vice premier Yagub Eyubov as head. Sports Minister Azad Ragimov was aided by the Caspian American Group to prepare the bid book with the assistance of the government. Baku's elimination was not unexpected, as one insider cited that practically no sports facilities meet global standards, the underdeveloped tourist sector, and regional conflicts. He cited 2020 or 2024 as times when Baku will have more serious arguments to win a bid. Baku's logo depicts petroglyph images from the Gobustan Rock Plateau, which features the remains of settlements and burials reflecting ancient human culture.
Doha	Qatar	Qatar Olympic Committee (QOC)	Not shortlisted
Main article: Doha bid for the 2016 Summer Olympics Doha submitted its bid to host the 2016 Summer Olympics after its hosting of the 2006 Asian Games, spending US$2.8 billion on infrastructure and venues. The Doha 2016 bid won much regional support, for example from the Olympic Council of Asia (OCA) president and the Gulf Cooperation Council. The Aspire Zone Sports City was to be the centerpiece of the bid, much as it served in the 2006 Asian Games. Qatar is in a growth period due to its petroleum reserves, and like Baku, is well situated to finance a large event. Doha is the only city in the Arab World other than Cairo to mount a serious bid, with pundits speculating the IOC may reward it by promoting it to the final shortlist. Although in a troubled area, Qatar is known as an open-minded country which is promoting acceptance and change and promoted a strong message of peace and acceptance for the region. In July and August, the average temperature in Doha can easily reach 45 °C (113 °F), thus they proposed mounting the Games in October. It is not without precedent (e.g. Mexico City and Sydney), but is technically outside the requirements. As Doha and Qatar in general (500,000 and 1,400,000 inhabitants, respectively) is among the smallest cities to bid to host the modern games, the Qataris would have to be innovative in bringing in spectators from neighboring countries to raise ticket sales. A side consideration is that like Azerbaijan, Qatar also has a short Olympic legacy, and has been criticised for its practice of giving "passports of convenience" to foreign athletes to pad their record. Only two new venues were to have been built, a velodrome and a baseball stadium, although a new Athletes' village was to be designed. Khalifa International Stadium currently seats 50,000, under the 60,000 to meet the IOC standards. Also, Qatar has plans to build the world's most advanced Paralympics stadium and the world's first underground stadium for matches during the 2011 AFC Asian Cup in Qatar. The Doha logo for the 2016 bid is the al dahma, the flower of the spring. The design uses motifs from traditional henna decorations and Doha is written in Arabic in the design.
Prague	Czech Republic	Czech Olympic Committee (ČOV)	Not shortlisted
Main article: Prague bid for the 2016 Summer Olympics On March 22, 2007, Prague confirmed its bid when the Prague Assembly voted 53-10-3 in support of launching an official bid. Regarded as one of the most beautiful and visited cities in Europe, Prague fulfills the cultural aspects that the IOC seeks in a candidate. With a strong sports history and excellent accommodations, Prague had potential to make a memorable host. However, Prague has few venues in place; the plans included building three sport centers—a velodrome for cyclists in Prague or Brno; a swimming stadium that would be constructed from the existing Prague-Sutka Aquapark; and the major Olympic complex to be built in Letnany. At the Aquapark, circular pools would be built to represent the Olympic rings. Other boating venues would be in Lipno, Racice, and Troja. Prague planned to use the Sazka Arena (now the O2 Arena) for gymnastics, and in some way the city planned to use or refurbish Strahov Stadium. Further details have stressed that perhaps only 30% of construction would leave a permanent legacy. After initial support from civic authorities such as mayor Pavel Bem, Prague's bid became a long-shot. Considering the lack of current stadia and other important Olympic sports infrastructure and the 2012 London hosting of the games, Prague was warming up for a later Olympic bid. Prague struggled with broader support in the Czech Republic; even president Václav Klaus publicly worried about budget estimates and white elephants. A public opinion poll in October 2007 mustered a quite low 50% support. Prague's bid logo features a branch from a laurel wreath, a traditional symbol of victory and celebration.

== Proposed dates and bid slogans ==
	Games of the XXXI Olympiad	XV Paralympic Games	Slogan
Rio de Janeiro	5–21 August	7–18 September	"Live your passion"
Madrid	5–21 August	9–20 September	"Hola everyone"
Tokyo	29 July – 14 August	30 August – 11 September	"Uniting Our Worlds"
Chicago	22 July – 7 August	17 – 28 August	"Let friendship shine"

== Potential cities overview ==
- (Australia) Several Australian cities expressed interest, such as Brisbane.
- Bangkok, Thailand, expressed much enthusiasm after their strong performance in the 2004 Games, but instead applied to host the 2010 Youth Games.
- Brussels, Belgium, showed interest after some politicians considered an organisation between a Belgian city and a Dutch City after the Euro 2000 co-organized by both countries.
- Buenos Aires, Argentina, participated in the 2004 Summer Olympics bid
- Cape Town and Durban, South Africa, expressed interest.
- Delhi, India, was originally set to enter a bid; however, in April 2007 it announced it would bid for the 2020 games instead.
- Dubai, United Arab Emirates, was also posed to make a serious bid, but in the end did not for unknown reasons.
- (Japan) Fukuoka and Sapporo were other internal candidates eliminated by the JOC.
- (United States) Houston and Philadelphia were eliminated by the USOC, San Francisco withdrew when it lost stadium funding and Chicago was chosen over Los Angeles for the bid competition.
- Istanbul, Turkey, broke with its standing policy to bid for every game, but vowed to try again.
- Lisbon, Portugal, considered bidding.
- (Mexico) Monterrey The Mexican Olympic committee declined to place a bid.
- Montreal and Toronto expressed interest, but Canada abandoned any plans for a bid after Vancouver won the 2010 Winter Olympics.
- Nairobi, Kenya – The sports minister expressed interest in a bid, but the Kenyan Olympics head said it was not the right time.
- Rome, Italy, was a leading candidate for a time, but they pulled out, preferring to wait for 2020.
- (Brazil) São Paulo was considered, but the Brazilian Olympic Committee opted for Rio de Janeiro.
- (United States) / (Mexico) San Diego and Tijuana discussed a joint bid for what would have been the first binational Olympics.

== Predicting indices ==
Two websites, GamesBids.com and Around the Rings, feature predicting indices which specialize in evaluations of Olympiad bids. They periodically release analysis of the candidates and assigns them a score between 0 and 100, or 0 and 110 respectively. The score produces a number that can be used to rate a bid relative to past successful bids—and possibly gauge its potential future success. GamesBids.com's scale is called BidIndex, AtR's is called the Power Index.

Table of unofficial predicting indices
Bidding city	GamesBids BidIndex	Around the Rings PowerIndex
Baku (bid details)	36.43	...
Chicago (bid details)	61.24	83
Doha (bid details)	53.46	...
Madrid (bid details)	57.80	80
Prague (bid details)	37.17	...
Rio de Janeiro (bid details)	61.42	84
Tokyo (bid details)	59.02	80

Both indices correctly predicted the winner, Rio de Janeiro, but failed to predict the poor showing of Chicago, which was the first to be eliminated from the final 4, as well as the strong showing of Madrid, who was the last contender against Rio.

=== Notes ===
1. Released on September 10, 2009. Doha, Prague, and Baku are no longer being rated. Their scores are from May 28, 2008.
2. as of September 27, 2009
