= Tokyo bid for the 2016 Summer Olympics =

Bids for the 2016 Summer Olympics and Paralympics
Overview
- Games of the XXXI Olympiad; XV Paralympic Games

- Winner: Rio de Janeiro; Runner-up: Madrid; Shortlist: Tokyo · Chicago

Details
- City: Tokyo, Japan
- Chair: Ichiro Kono
- NOC: Japanese Olympic Committee

Evaluation
- IOC score: 8.3

Previous Games hosted
- 1964 Summer Olympics

Decision
- Result: 2nd runner-up (20 votes)

The Japanese capital of Tokyo mounted an unsuccessful bid to host the 2016 Summer Olympics and 2016 Summer Paralympics. The bid was first recognized by the International Olympic Committee (IOC) on September 14, 2007. The IOC shortlisted four of the seven applicant cities—Chicago, United States; Madrid, Spain; Rio de Janeiro, Brazil; and Tokyo, Japan; over Baku, Azerbaijan; Doha, Qatar; and Prague, Czech Republic—on June 4, 2008 during a meeting in Athens, Greece. This was followed by an intensive bidding process which finished with the election of Rio de Janeiro at the 121st IOC Session in Copenhagen, Denmark, on October 2, 2009.

Tokyo earned the top scores during the Applicant phase, after a detailed study of the Applicant Files received by the IOC Working Group on January 14, 2008. Between April 16 and April 19, 2009, the IOC Evaluation Commission, led by Nawal El Moutawakel, arrived in Tokyo to assess the conditions of the city. The Commission attended technical presentations, participated in question-and-answer sessions about the Candidature File and made inspections in all the existing venues across the city. Tokyo was eliminated in the second round of voting with only 20 votes in a three-round exhaustive ballot of the IOC.

The Japanese Olympic Committee (JOC) nominated Tokyo over Fukuoka as its candidate city to host the 2016 Summer Olympics and Paralympics on August 30, 2006. This is the country's third failure, after two failed attempts for the 1988 and the 2008 Summer Olympics. Recent Olympic Games in Asia as the 2008 Summer Olympics in Beijing, China, hurt Tokyo's bid. In 2013, Tokyo was selected to host the 2020 Summer Olympics, marking the second Summer Olympics in Japan, after the 1964 Summer Olympics, and the fourth hosted in Japan, after the 1972 Winter Olympics in Sapporo and the 1998 Winter Olympics in Nagano.

== Tokyo's bid ==
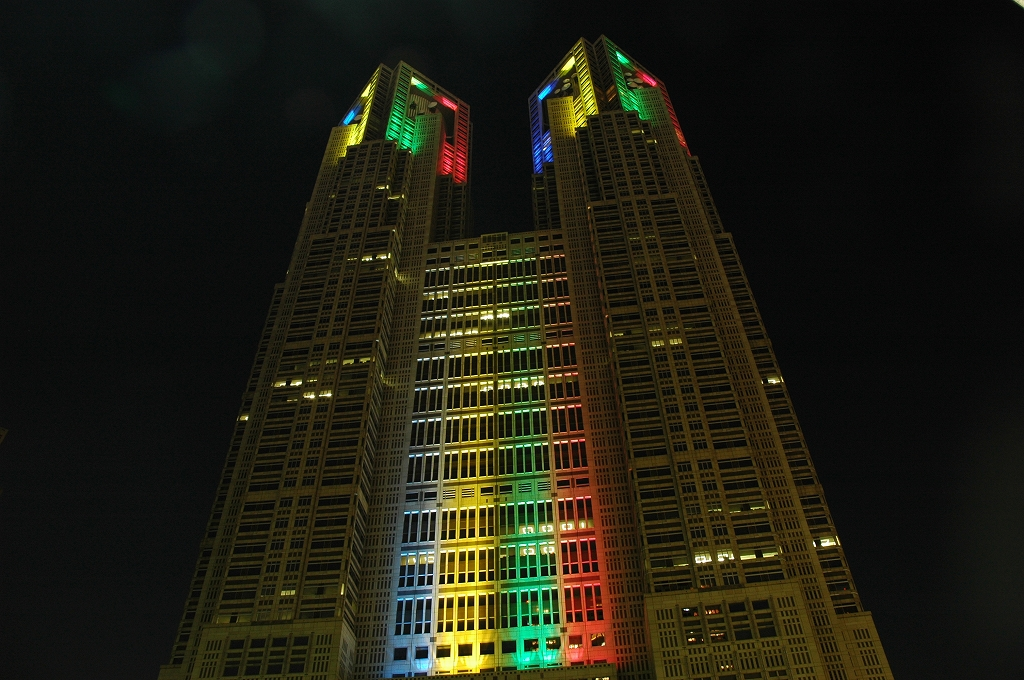
Tokyo Metropolitan Government Building lit in Olympic colours

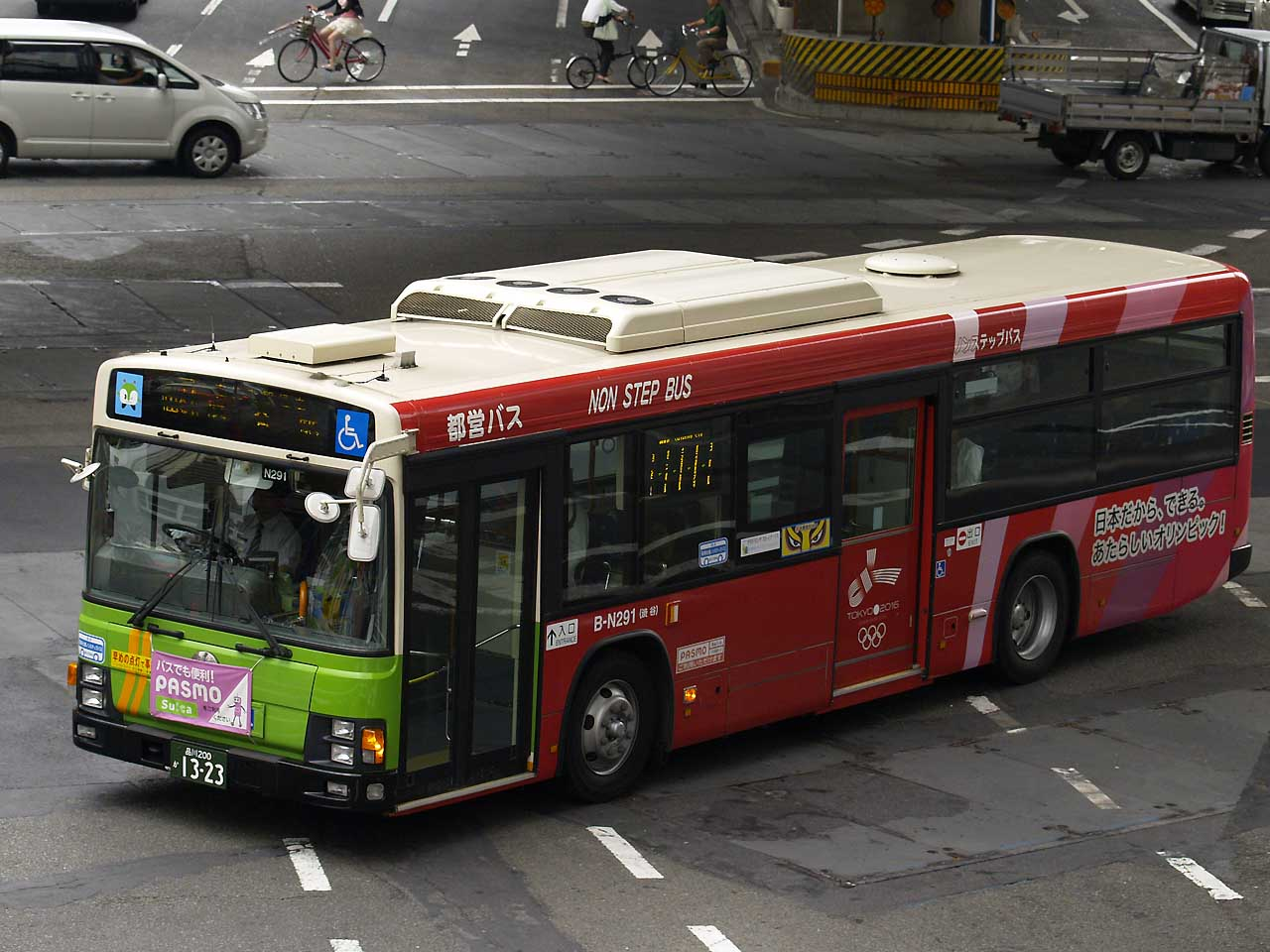
Fleet of Toei Bus wrapped with Tokyo 2016 Olympic bid advertising.

=== City selection ===
The Japanese Olympic Committee (JOC) set a deadline of June 30, 2006, for cities to submit bids. It decided on August 30, 2006, that Tokyo would be the country's candidate for 2016. The other major internal candidate from Japan was the western city of Fukuoka on the island of Kyūshū. Reportedly, Osaka (2008 Summer Olympics bid), Sapporo (which held the 1972 Winter Olympics), and Nagoya (1988 Summer Olympics bid) also expressed an interest in bidding,

=== Bid details ===
Tokyo touted "the most compact and efficient Olympic Games ever" with a dramatic setting on the waterfront, previously an area used primarily for industry and shipping; Tokyo will have a chance to redevelop a rundown area (as London and Barcelona did in previous hostings), revitalizing the waterfront with housing, retail, and entertainment venues, some from land reclaimed from Tokyo Bay. The landfill will be a forest island for use as the site of equestrian, canoeing and other sporting events, named "Umi no Mori" or "Forest on the Sea". The mottos were "Uniting Our Worlds" (Japanese: 私たちの世界を結ぶ) in English, and "It's Japan, so we can do it. The new Olympics!" (日本だから、できる。新しいオリンピック!, Nihon dakara Dekiru. Atarashī Orinpikku!) in Japanese.

Tokyo Skyline with Mount Fuji in the background

The public relations firm of Weber Shandwick Worldwide was retained by the Tokyo 2016 Bid Committee to develop public relations campaigns and global support. Weber Shandwick's track record includes working on previous bids for the winning campaigns of Sydney in 2000, Turin in 2006, Beijing in 2008, and Sochi in 2014.

The bid followed the success of the 2002 FIFA World Cup, which Japan co-hosted with South Korea. In addition to Tokyo's hosting of the 1964 Summer Olympics, Japan has past Olympic experience as the host of the 1972 Winter Games in Sapporo and the 1998 Winter Games in Nagano.

=== Venues ===
The Olympic park at the city center was to allow the Olympic experience to "permeate the city without compromising Olympic operations". A new stadium (designed by Tadao Ando) was to be built to seat 100,000, and later pared back to 80,000 to leave a desired "legacy building". The new Olympic Village was to contain five high-rise buildings, each representing one of the Olympic Rings. Primarily lying in two tight clusters of 31 planned venues, 21 already exist and the Japanese will need to build ten new venues, including five which would be temporary for Games use only. Plans were to refurbish many venues from the 1964 Summer Olympic Games, located within just 20 minutes of the waterfront. At first, the planned Media Center was to be located within ten minutes of the Ginza, on the site of the current Tsukiji fish market, but soil pollution has occurred around the newly planned Toyosu fish market, so the plan was separated from the discussion of the fish market's replacement. The Media Center has been changed to Tokyo Big Sight.

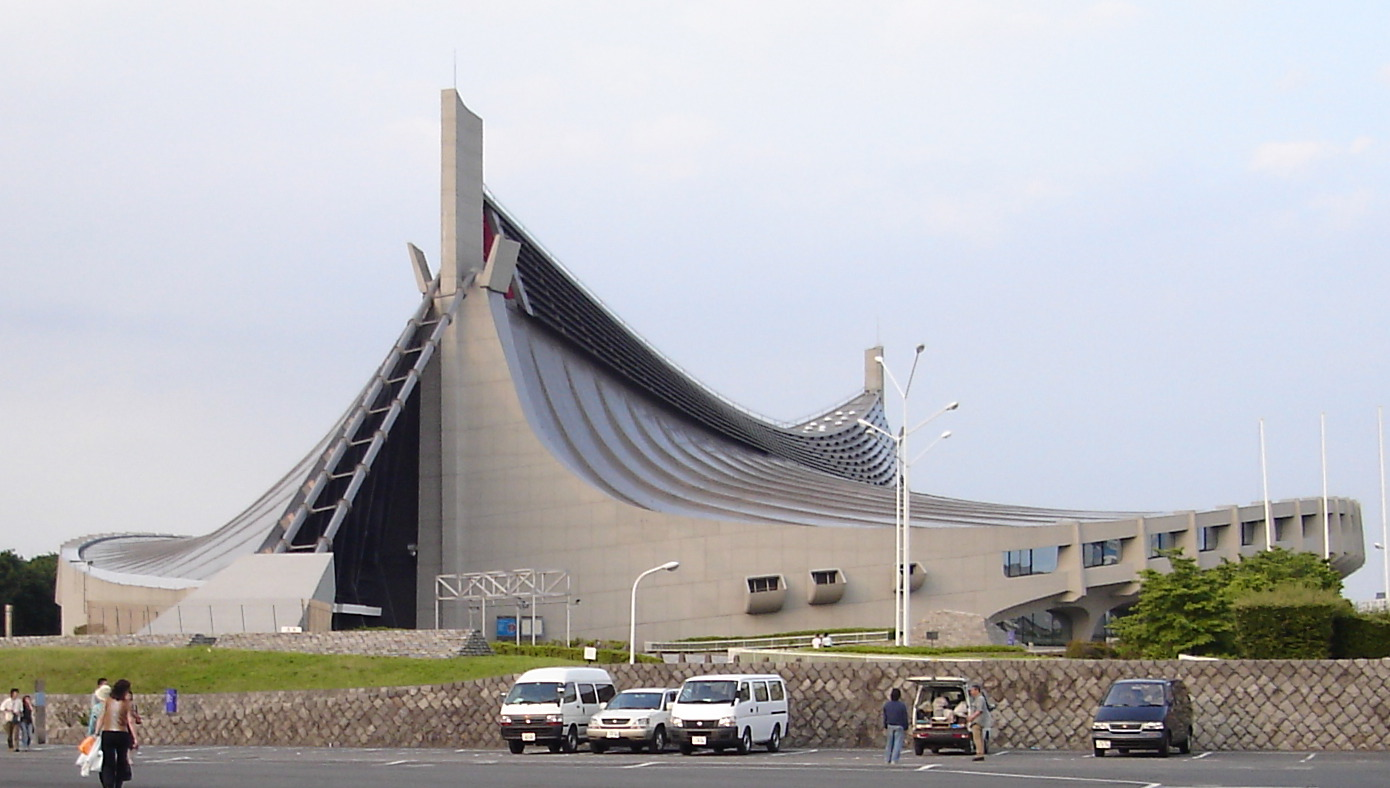
Yoyogi National Gymnasium, built for the 1964 Summer Olympics

Several existing and proposed facilities would host events at the 2016 Olympics. Among them are the following:

- Tokyo Olympic Stadium (東京オリンピックスタジアム): A stadium that was to have been built in Ariake in Chūō, Tokyo, on the seaside with Tokyo Bay. Opening and closing ceremonies; track and field; soccer finals; destination of marathon and walking events
- National Stadium (国立霞ヶ丘競技場): An existing sports complex at Meiji Jingū Gaien in Shinjuku and Minato, Tokyo, including National Stadium and Chichibunomiya Rugby Stadium. Start of marathon
- Ariake Coliseum, Ariake Tennis no Mori Park (有明テニスの森公園): An existing tennis facility in Ariake. Tennis
- Odaiba Kaihin Park (お台場海浜公園): An existing public park. Triathlon
- Shiokaze Park (潮風公園): An existing public park in Shinagawa, Tokyo. Beach volleyball
- Yoyogi National Gymnasium: Facility built for 1964 Olympics. Handball
- Yoyogi Park Arena: Volleyball
- Tokyo Metropolitan Gymnasium: Built for the 1956 World Wrestling Championship and used in the 1964 Olympics. Table tennis
- Nippon Budokan: Built for judo in the 1964 Olympics. Judo
- Tokyo Imperial Palace Outer Gardens: Start of bicycling road race
- Tokyo International Forum :Weightlifting
- Umi-no-Mori (Sea Forest) (海の森): Proposed public park to be built on reclaimed land in Tokyo Bay. Cross-country, canoeing (flatwater), swimming (10 km), bicycling (mountain bike-BMX)
- Tatsumi no Mori Kaihin Park (辰巳の森海浜公園): Existing park in Kōtō, Tokyo. Swimming, diving, water polo, synchronized swimming, modern pentathlon (swimming)
- Yume no Shima Stadium: Equestrian (dressage and show jumping)
- Yume no Shima Park (夢の島公園): An existing public park in Kōtō, Tokyo. Archery

The master plan does not show venues for either golf or rugby, however there is a golf course, Wakasu Golf Links, near Wakasu Olympic Marina (planned, for sailing) and Umi no Mori (Sea Forest) venues. Taizō Kawada, of the Japan Golf Association (JGA), suggests this venue could be used.

=== Funding ===
The expenses for the bid are estimated at between 5.5 and 7 billion yen (approximately US$50 million). Funding will come from the Tokyo Metropolitan Government to cover 1.5 billion for the preparations, and the remaining funds will come from the private sector. The plan gives evidence of a national financial guarantee to cover any cost over runs and some infrastructure projects. The bid budget is set at US $48 million jointly funded by private and public sources. This is in line with most other bids. Estimated revenue is set at $1.557 billion.

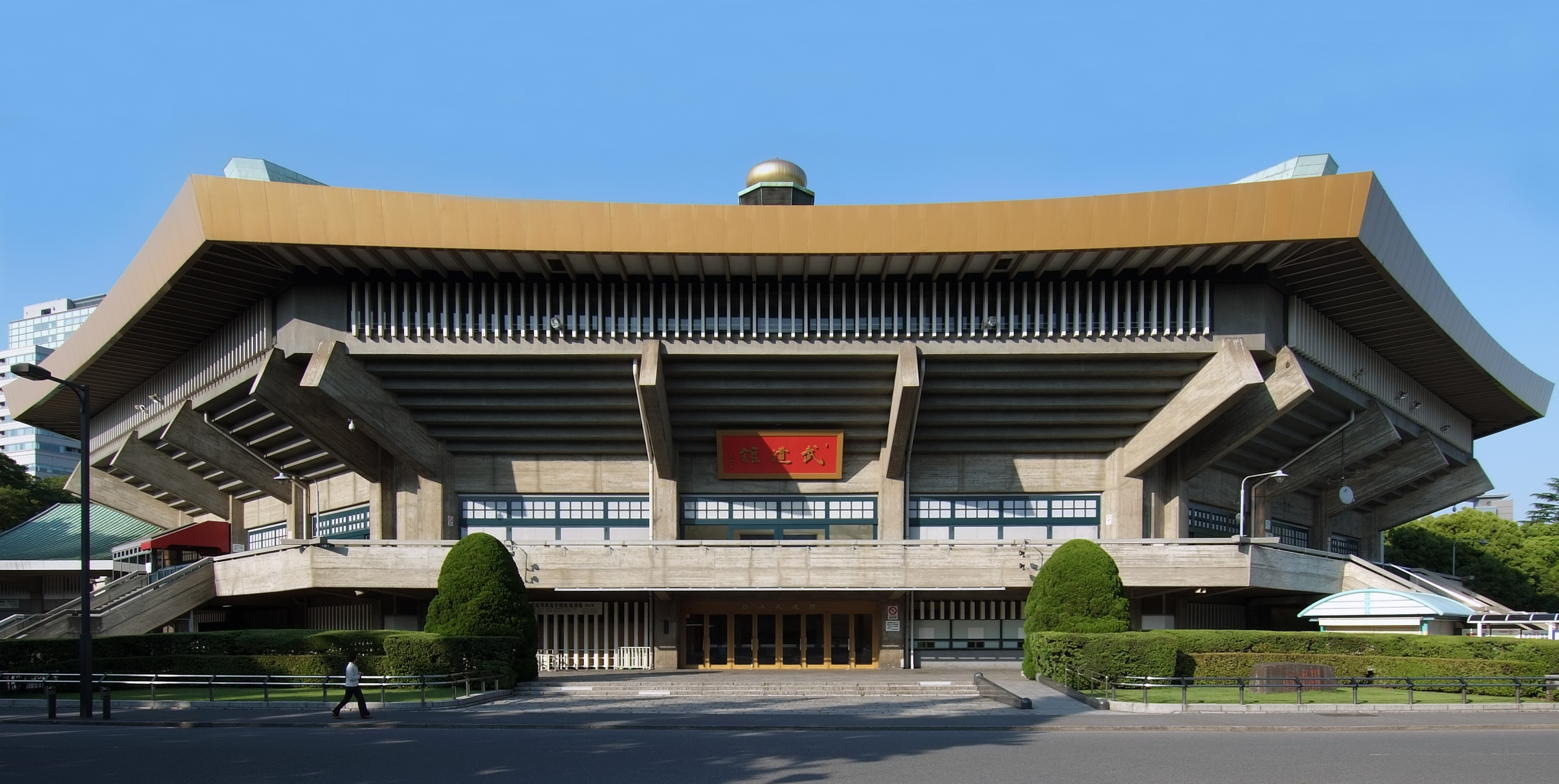
Nippon Budokan martial arts pavilion built for the 1964 Games

=== Green games ===
Tokyo also touted its effort to design green games that coexist in harmony with the natural environment. They will utilize five temporary structures and measures for reducing CO_{2} emissions and energy consumption. For example, the Olympic village, built in the Ariake area bordering Tokyo Bay, would feature an array of eco-friendly systems such as solar and renewable energy, and aim for total waste recycling. After the Games, they would be converted to rental apartments and condominiums in a greenery-rich area.

The Yumenoshima landfill will be an 88-hectare island in Tokyo Bay with compost made from fallen leaves and twigs gathered in the public parks and streets of Tokyo. The trash landfill will be transformed into a green forest where 480,000 trees will be planted, in addition to the sports venues located on the island. In addition, Tokyo plans to promote the use of more low-emissions buses and other vehicles in order to reduce in traffic congestion and help curb emissions from carbon dioxide.

=== Logo ===
The logo of the Tokyo bid takes the form of a traditional Japanese knot known as musubi. The five Olympic colors are used in the decorative knot; the musubi has long been utilized in Japan to signify blessings during times of celebration.

== Outlook ==
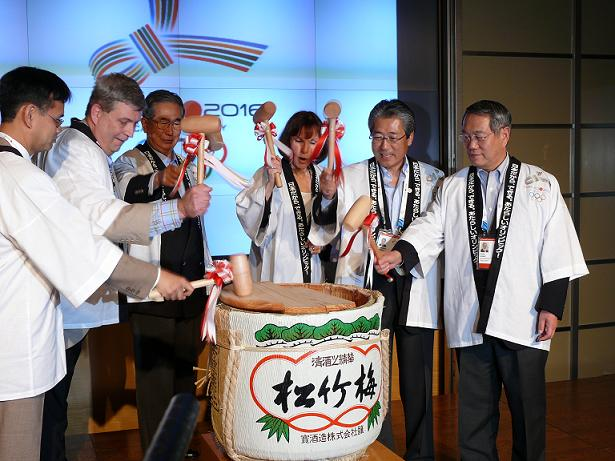
Leaders of the Tokyo bid crack open a barrel of sake with help from members of Bid Committee

Tokyo's bid was promoted to the Candidate City shortlist in June 2008. Despite Tokyo's many strengths, the Beijing Games will have been held in the region eight years before, as well as Tokyo's own previous hosting in 1964. However, on numerous occasions the Olympics have been held eight years apart on the same continent.

From 72% in March 2008, Tokyo local support fell to 56% in May 2009, the lowest support among the candidate cities. However, other polls conducted in early 2009 by some of the largest local publishers showed more than 70% support of the plan. Tokyo had worked hard to increase the popularity of its bid, even promoting the games on the Tokyo Tower and the Tokyo Metropolitan Government Building by displaying "Tokyo" and "2016" in the Olympic colors.

In the Tokyo Metropolitan Assembly and the Diet of Japan, several left-wing and progressive parties opposed the bid; the Japan Communist Party (JCP), the Tokyo Seikatsusha Network (TSN) and the Social Democratic Party (SDPJ) The JCP explained that because of the games, many highway lines, especially the Tokyo Gaikan Expressway will be constructed with huge costs, more than is allocated to other policies: welfare, labor, education and so on. The new government led by the Democratic Party of Japan (DPJ) have been more cautious than the Liberal Democratic Party (LDP) under the leadership of the governor, Shintarō Ishihara; Ishihara was the advocate for the bid in 2006. However, the DPJ voted for the resolutions which support this bid, both in the Diet and the Assembly, and their new Prime Minister Yukio Hatoyama attended the meeting in Copenhagen.

Many former Olympic athletes lent their support on the Tokyo bid committee website, including Kōsuke Kitajima (gold medalist for the men's 100m and 200m breaststroke at both the Athens 2004 and Beijing 2008 games). Three other athletes have also expressed their support: Koji Murofushi, the winner of the men's hammer throw in Athens 2004, Mara Yamauchi, a British long distance track and field woman athlete, and Mayumi Narita who holds 15 gold medals in three Paralympics with the women's swimming. In the PR video, French-Japanese TV announcer Christel Takigawa introduces the charm of Tokyo in French, and Riyo Mori, the Miss Universe 2007 winner, spoke in English. Naoko Takahashi, the champion in Sydney 2000 and the former world record holder in the women's marathon, is the project reader of a roughly 10,000 km (6,200 mi)virtual ekiden (long distance relay) from Tokyo to Copenhagen, the venue of the IOC meeting to determine the host city on October 2, 2009. The Tokyo Marathon is one of the main publicity events for this bid.

On September 7, 2013, Tokyo won their bid to host the 2020 Summer Olympics.

== See also ==
- Tokyo bid for the 2020 Summer Olympics
