= Baku bid for the 2016 Summer Olympics =

Bids for the 2016 Summer Olympics and Paralympics
Overview
- Games of the XXXI Olympiad; XV Paralympic Games
- Winner: Rio de Janeiro; Runner-up: Madrid; Shortlist: Tokyo · Chicago

Details
- City: Baku, Azerbaijan
- NOC: National Olympic Committee of Azerbaijan

Evaluation
- IOC score: 4.3

Previous Games hosted
- None

Decision
- Result: Not shortlisted.

Baku 2016 (Azerbaijani: Bakı 2016) was an unsuccessful bid for the 2016 Summer Olympics by Baku, the capital city of Azerbaijan. It was the first bid by the city to host the Olympic games. Baku was eliminated from the running at the announcement of the Candidate city shortlist on June 4, 2008.

If Baku had been chosen to host, the games would have been held between July 15 and July 31, 2016. The Paralympics would have been held between August 10 and August 22.

== Bid details ==
Azerbaijan's capital, Baku, announced its plans to bid for the Olympics, with initial studies suggesting that the cost of hosting the 2016 Summer Olympics may be $20 billion. In July 2007, Chingiz Huseynzade, chairman of Azerbaijan's National Olympic Committee, told a press conference that a group of economists was working on this issue. Baku is Azerbaijan's oil-rich capital city, on the shores of the Caspian Sea. The city had become somewhat run down following the chaotic period during which independent Azerbaijan emerged from the former Soviet Union but has been experiencing massive development since a new oil-boom began around 2003. As a city in the crossroads between East and West, Huseynzade suggested that the theme of the games might be "making a better connection between East and West"

In November 2007, the Azerbaijan Organizing Committee established its bid committee, installing first vice premier Yagub Eyubov as head. To ensure quick turnaround, Sports Minister Azad Ragimov appointed the Caspian American Group to prepare the bid book with the assistance of the government.

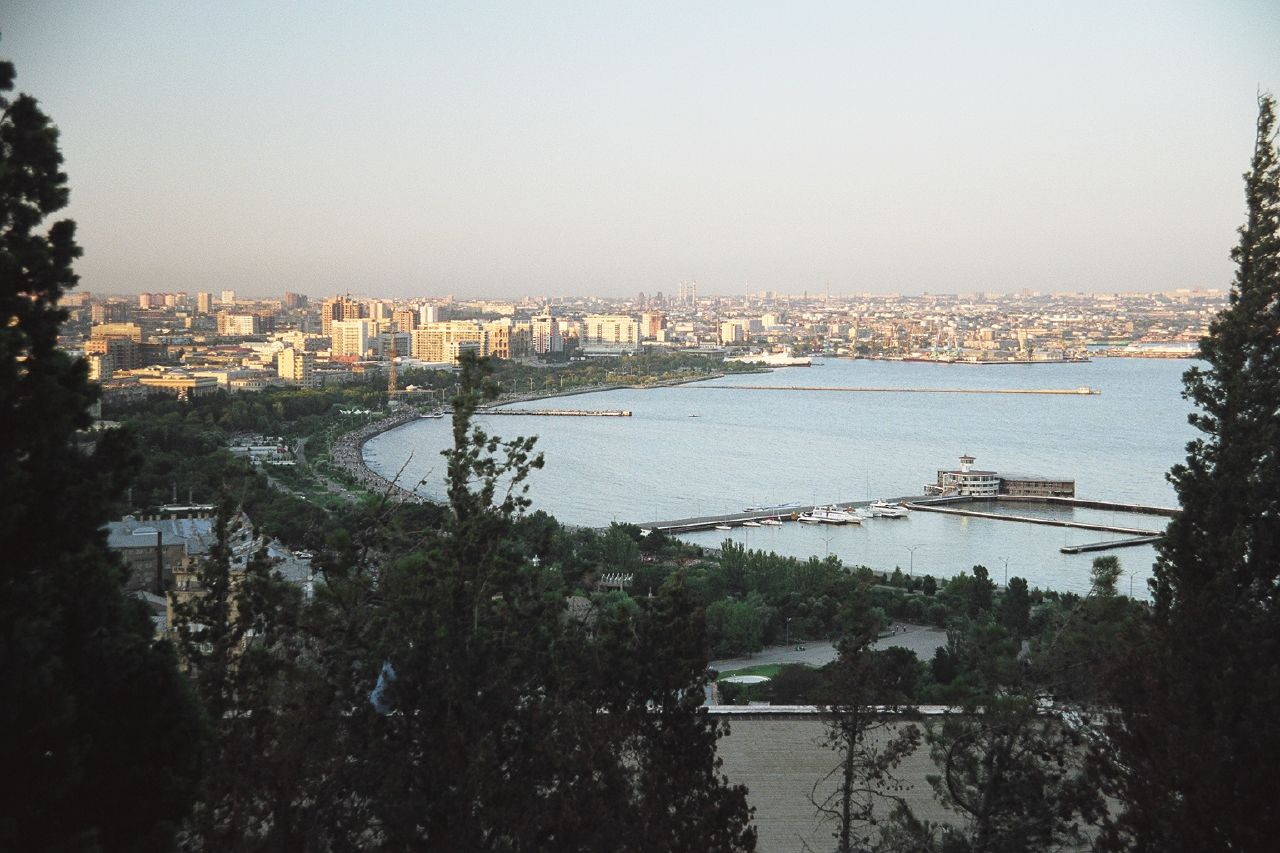
View of Baku

Recent sports experience included Baku's hosting of the 2007 World Wrestling Championships and the 23rd European Rhythmic Gymnastics Championships at the Heydar Aliyev Sport Complex, named for the former Azeri leader.

The bid was popular with residents, with 91.9% of residents being in favor of the bid. This was the highest approval rating of any of the applicants, most of which were in the 70s–80s percent range.

One issue that appeals to the IOC is the sports or Olympic legacy of a host nation. As Azerbaijan has been independent only a short time, naturally, it has a short Olympic history, sending teams since only 1996 and claiming only three gold medalists so far. Meanwhile, its long border with Iran may have caused concerns for a security risk. However, Iran itself expressed support for the Baku Olympic bid. In addition, the South Caucasus is a region with two other frozen political conflicts, which may have negatively influenced support of the regional Games.

=== Funding ===
As an oil rich nation, Azerbaijan has plenty of money to fund the games. The country produces 730,000 barrels (116,000 m^{3}) of oil daily which would pay for Baku’s bid. A member of the bid team said, “oil money coming into the Azerbaijani economy in the next 20 years will be $200 billion." With full government backing and financial guarantees, revenue was estimated to be US $930 million.

The application and candidacy phase were budgeted at US$27.8 million, low in comparison to the other bids, which were mostly in the $40 million range.

=== Infrastructure ===
Although wealthy, the city's infrastructure has deteriorated since the breakup of the Soviet Union. Currently, many of Baku’s downtown seaside esplanades are overshadowed by sprawling docks, freight containers, and loading cranes. Plans are to move port operations to “another part of Azerbaijan". The city’s airport will have to be expanded and an estimated 60 hotels in Baku and more outside the city will need to be built. Currently, 23,000 various accommodations exist but 81,000 new rooms are planned. This goal was considered quite ambitious and may not be feasible. The Azeris are planning at least three more subway stations, one at the airport, and two at the Olympic Village and Olympic Stadium, to be located on the city's outskirts.

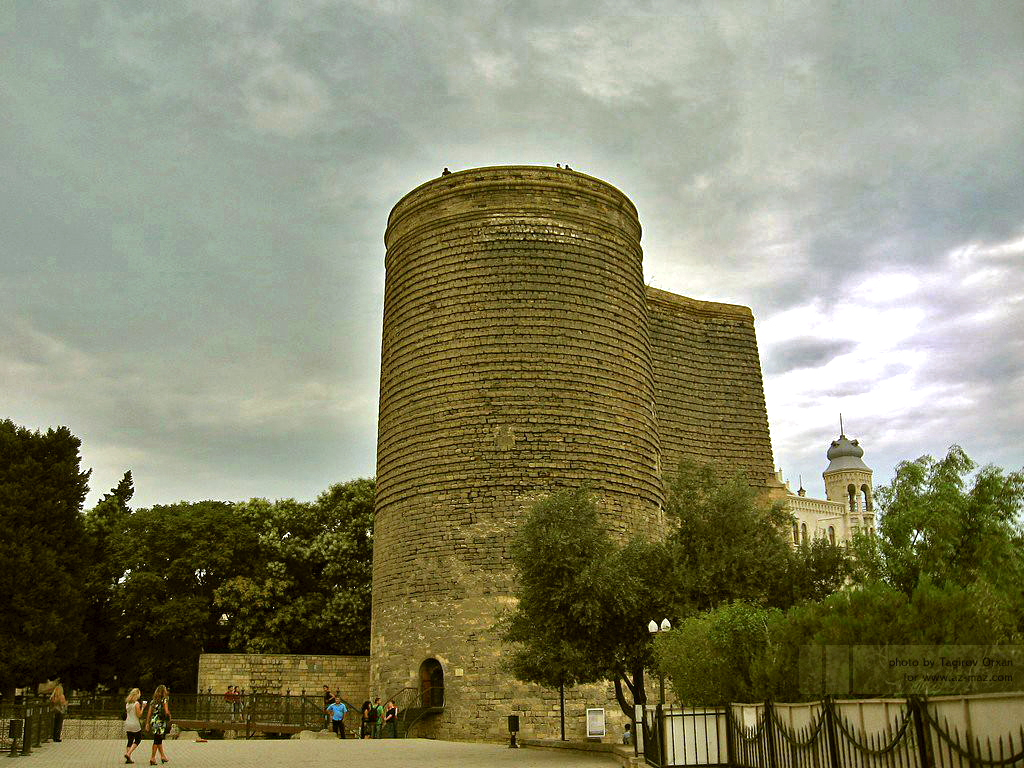
Maiden Tower, symbol of Baku

=== Venues ===
Baku's most notable existing venue was the Heydar Aliev Sports Complex. Baku revealed plans to build 15 new and 8 temporary structures in four clusters, including a US$254 million Olympic Stadium. The plan was fairly compact, with most venues less than 10 km from the Olympic Village. The Olympic Village would be a low-density apartment project on the waterfront replacing many of the numerous warehouses and docks. Financed jointly with private and public funds, it west to later be sold and used as a residential community.

The Olympic Park was planned for the historic Bibi-Heybat oilfield. This was the first area where drilling began in 1847. The transformation was designed to be part of an overall renaturalization process for the region.

=== Logo ===
Baku revealed its logo in December 2007. The logo depicts petroglyph images from the UNESCO World Heritage Site of Gobustan Rock Plateau, which features the remains of settlements and burials reflecting ancient human culture.

== Outlook, conclusion, and future ==
Despite Baku's booming economy and wealth of oil, its candidacy was considered a long shot. Concerns centered on infrastructure, budget of the games (which can inflate easily), and the close proximity of Baku to the European city of Sochi, Russia, which hosted the 2014 Winter Olympics. While Baku is an Asian city, it may be too close to Sochi as the IOC tries to rotate the Games to different continents. Other points included practically no sports facilities meeting global standards, the underdeveloped tourist sector, and regional conflicts.

The bid team acknowledged the chances of Baku winning the 2016 bid were small, but like Prague's bid, it gave them plenty of experience for future bids, as well as strong publicity for a smaller country.

Baku announced its interest in bidding for the 2020 and 2024 editions of the Summer Olympics, with the possibility of a bid for the 2014 Summer Youth Olympics (which was later won by Nanjing). Baku bid for the 2020 Summer Olympics but failed to become a candidate.

== See also ==
- Azerbaijan at the 2016 Summer Olympics
- Baku bid for the 2020 Summer Olympics
