= Madrid bid for the 2016 Summer Olympics =

2016 Olympics bid by Madrid, Spain

Bids for the 2016 Summer Olympics and Paralympics
Overview
- Games of the XXXI Olympiad; XV Paralympic Games

- Winner: Rio de Janeiro; Runner-up: Madrid; Shortlist: Tokyo · Chicago

Details
- City: Madrid, Spain
- Chair: Mercedes Coghen
- NOC: Spanish Olympic Committee

Evaluation
- IOC score: 8.1

Previous Games hosted
- None • Bid for 1972 and 2012; Spain hosted the 1992 Summer Olympics

Decision
- Result: 1st runner-up (32 votes)

The Madrid bid for the 2016 Summer Olympics and Paralympics was an unsuccessful bid, first recognized by the International Olympic Committee (IOC) on September 14, 2007. The IOC shortlisted four of the seven applicant cities—Chicago, United States; Tokyo, Japan; Rio de Janeiro, Brazil; and Madrid, Spain; over Baku, Azerbaijan; Doha, Qatar; and Prague, Czech Republic—on June 4, 2008 during a meeting in Athens, Greece. This was followed by an intensive bidding process which finished with the election of Rio de Janeiro at the 121st IOC Session in Copenhagen, Denmark, on October 2, 2009.

Along with Tokyo, Madrid earned the top scores during the Applicant phase, after a detailed study of the Applicant Files received by the IOC Working Group on January 14, 2008. Between May 4 and May 9, 2009, the IOC Evaluation Commission, led by Nawal El Moutawakel, arrived in Madrid to assess the conditions of the city. The Commission attended technical presentations, participated in question-and-answer sessions about the Candidature File and made inspections in all the existing venues across the city. Rio de Janeiro won the final round by a margin of 34 votes over Madrid in a three-round exhaustive ballot of the IOC.

The Spanish Olympic Committee (SOC) confirmed Madrid as its candidate city to host the 2016 Summer Olympics and Paralympics on May 30, 2007. This is the city's second consecutive bid and its third failure, after two failed attempts for the 1972 and the 2012 Summer Olympics. Geographic issues were highlighted as a major problem for Madrid due to recent Olympic Games in Europe as the 2012 Summer Olympics in London, United Kingdom, and the 2014 Winter Olympics in Sochi, Russia. If successful, it would be the second Olympics hosted in Spain, after the 1992 Summer Olympics held in Barcelona.

== Candidature process ==
After failing to achieve victory in the election process of the host city of the 2012 Summer Olympics, the city council of Madrid decided to nominate it a candidate to host the 2016 Summer Olympics and Paralympics on July 3, 2006. The nomination was encouraged by statements of the president of the International Olympic Committee (IOC), Jacques Rogge, that European cities would still have a chance to host the 2016 Olympic Games. The International Olympic Committee (IOC) launched the bidding process for the 2016 Summer Olympics and Paralympics on May 16, 2007. On May 30, 2007, the candidature was formalized by the Spanish Olympic Committee (SOC) with claims to be "radically new" and more prepared than the city's last attempt to host the Olympics. The IOC announced that seven cities—Baku, Chicago, Doha, Madrid, Prague, Rio de Janeiro, and Tokyo—were submitted by their respective NOCs to bid for the 2016 Olympic and Paralympic Games. The Madrid bid committee attended the 2016 Applicant Cities' Seminar in Lausanne, Switzerland, on October 18, 2007, where it learnt more about the bidding process. The Application Files, which contain the answers and guarantees requested by the IOC's 2016 Candidature Acceptance Procedure and Questionnaire, were returned by all seven applicant cities to the IOC on January 14, 2008. The responses were studied by the IOC Working Group and the IOC Executive Board, at the latter meeting to decide which cities would be accepted as candidate cities.

On June 4, 2008, the IOC announced that Chicago, Tokyo, Rio de Janeiro, and Madrid were selected to the next bidding phase, during a meeting in Athens, Greece. This decision was based on a report by a special IOC Working Group of experts, after a thorough technical analysis of the projects presented on the files submitted by the applicant cities. Each city's potential for staging successful Summer Olympics and Paralympics in 2016 was assessed by the Working Group according to eleven criteria: government support, legal issues and public opinion; general infrastructure; sport venues; Olympic village; environment conditions and impact; accommodation; transport concept; safety and security; experience from past sport events; finance; and overall project and legacy. From August 5 - 26, 2008, the bidding committees from the four candidate cities participated in the Olympic Games Observer Program, during the Beijing 2008 Summer Olympics. Madrid officials also followed the completion of the 2008 Summer Paralympics. The IOC announced that it had received the Candidature Files of all four candidate cities on February 12, 2009. The Madrid 2016 Candidate File has three volumes covering 600 pages divided into 17 topics, with 671 guarantees and 80 images. According to the Madrid bid committee, the dossier was produced by more than 150 people, who invested more than 16,000 hours of work. The front cover image includes the names of 350 of the 2,850 people who have been part of the formulation of the document.

Evaluation of the Madrid bid for the 2016 Summer Olympics
Criteria and Sub-criteria	Madrid			Chicago	Rio	Tokyo
(Weighting)	Minimum	Maximum	Average	Average	Average	Average
Government support, legal issues and public opinion (2)	7.5	9.0	8.2	8.0	7.0	7.7
Government support & commitment	7.0	9.0	8.2	7.0	8.0	8.0
Olympic Charter & legal aspects	8.0	9.0	8.5	7.0	8.5	8.5
Public opinion	—	—	9.0	7.4	7.7	9.0
General infrastructure (5)	7.9	8.9	8.4	6.4	6.2	8.2
Existing transport infrastructure	8.0	9.0	8.5	7.0	6.0	8.7
Planned and additional transport infrastructure	8.5	9.5	9.0	6.0	8.0	8.5
Airport	8.5	9.5	9.0	9.0	6.2	9.0
IBC/MPC	8.0	9.0	8.5	8.0	7.0	7.2
Sports venues (4)	7.9	8.8	8.3	6.5	6.2	7.8
Existing venues	8.0	9.0	8.5	6.7	6.7	7.7
Planned and additional venues	8.0	9.0	8.5	6.5	7.2	8.0
Sports concept & legacy	8.0	9.0	8.5	7.0	7.0	8.0
Olympic Village (3)	7.4	8.7	8.0	7.8	6.8	8.2
Location	8.0	9.0	8.5	8.5	7.0	9.0
Concept	7.0	9.0	8.0	7.5	7.0	8.0
Legacy	8.5	9.5	9.0	8.5	8.5	8.7
Environmental conditions and impact (2)	7.4	8.8	8.1	7.0	6.6	8.2
Conditions	6.5	8.5	7.5	7.0	6.0	7.7
Impact	8.0	9.0	8.5	7.0	7.0	8.5
Accommodation (5)	7.8	8.8	8.3	9.6	5.9	9.8
Concept	7.0	9.0	8.0	8.0	6.0	9.0
Transport concept (3)	8.0	9.0	8.5	6.5	6.5	8.0
Distances and travel times	8.0	9.0	8.5	6.5	6.0	8.5
Transport organisation and traffic management	8.0	9.0	8.5	6.5	7.0	7.5
Safety and security (3)	7.1	7.9	7.5	7.6	5.8	8.4
Experience from past sports events (2)	7.2	8.2	7.7	6.7	7.2	7.0
Number of sports events organised	8.0	9.0	8.5	6.5	7.7	7.0
Quality	6.0	7.0	6.5	7.0	6.5	7.0
Finance (3)	6.5	8.5	7.5	7.2	6.8	7.7
Overall project and legacy (3)	8.0	9.0	8.5	6.5	6.7	8.0
Average scores	—	—	8.1	7.0	6.4	8.3
Feasibility
Criteria and Sub-criteria	Minimum	Maximum	Average	Average	Average	Average
General infrastructure Planned and additional transport infrastructure	—	—	0.90	0.80	0.80	0.90
Sports venues Planned and additional venues	—	—	0.95	0.90	0.85	0.95
Olympic Village(s); Concept	—	—	0.90	0.90	0.85	0.90
Accommodation; Number of rooms (3-5 star)	0.70	0.90	0.80	—	0.80	—
Accommodation; Number of rooms (Media villages)	0.60	0.80	0.70	—	0.75	—
Accommodation; Number of rooms (Other)	0.50	0.70	0.60	—	0.75	—
Telecommunications
Category	Minimum	Maximum	Average	Average	Average	Average
Cities/countries which already offer a very good level of general telecom infrastructure and service availability to support the 2016 Summer Olympics.	—	—	✓	✓	✗	✓
Cities/countries which appear to offer a satisfactory level of development with modernisation plans underway that would support the 2016 Summer Olympics.	—	—	✗	✗	✓	✗
Cities/countries for which the level of telecommunication platforms and services is less advanced and would require clear planning and commitment to develop all necessary telecom aspects to support the organisation of the 2016 Summer Olympics.	—	—	✗	✗	✗	✗

== Candidature concept ==
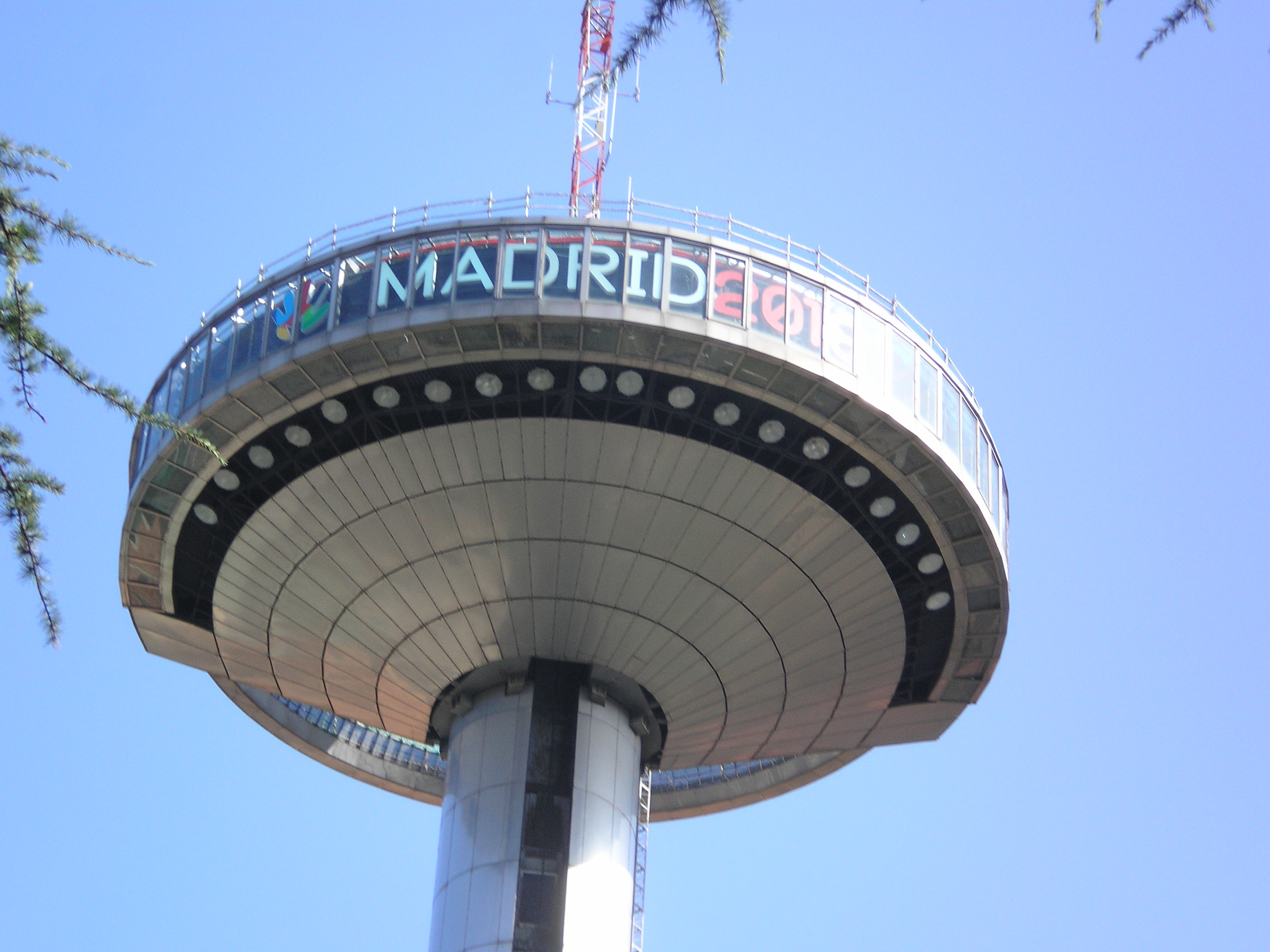
Moncloa "Lighthouse" with supporting slogan for Madrid's bid for 2016 Olympics.

Madrid has a strong sports culture, hosting three football (soccer) teams and two basketball teams; the most successful being Real Madrid C.F. which plays in Estadio Santiago Bernabéu. Madrid hosted the 1982 FIFA World Cup final. The cycling classic Vuelta a España final stages are held in Madrid as Paris serves for the Tour de France.

Madrid's bid enjoyed extremely high levels of support from its citizens. A recent poll put Madrid's support levels at 92.6%, and 25,000 volunteers had signed up to demonstrate their support for the city's candidacy. Madrid 2016 also had over 60 corporate sponsors.

A contest was run to submit a logo for the games. A number were chosen from which the public could vote, finalizing the final three. The official logo was revealed in late September 2007, which was elected by a group of experts. The logo is named "Corle" and represents a hand in the colors of the Olympics, welcoming foreigners to the games. The silhouette of an 'M', representing Madrid, is also hidden in the hand. It was designed by an Argentine, Joaquin Malle. The initial design was merely an outline of the hand; the final version bursts with color rings within the hand.

Madrid previously bid for the 2012 Olympics. Changes were made to the 2012 bid, while the city expected to build on its high reputation from its previous bids. In the 2012 bid, experts considered Madrid's bid very strong, and it actually placed first in the third round (before being eliminated in the fourth round). The 2012 bid was overall second in technical evaluation, with a rating of 8.3. Madrid was ranked first in seven categories: Government support, legal issues and public opinion; General infrastructure; Environment; Sports venues; Olympic Village; Transport concept; and Overall project and legacy.

When Madrid was promoted to the 2016 "Candidate City" phase in June 2008, it ranked second in the evaluation of the technical bid, with a score of 8.1 (on a 10-point scale). The city was ranked a close fourth on two predicting indice scales, primarily because of geographical factors. Coghen has emphasized in interviews that "cities, not continents" are chosen to host. Madrid repeatedly described itself as the "safe bid".

== Candidature project ==
The competition venues for the Games would have been sited in two main clusters.

The Eastern zone would have been the location of the Olympic Stadium, Aquatic Centre, the Olympic Village, the Real Madrid Arena at Ciudad Real Madrid (which would have held basketball events), and the IFEMA Fairgrounds (eight sports plus the Press Center).

The River Zone aside the Manzanares River would have hosted the venues for rowing, beach volleyball, archery, cycling, tennis, modern pentathlon, triathlon, equestrian and rhythmic gymnastics. After the games, the river bank would have become a public park celebrating sport, culture and music.

The city completed a swimming and tennis venues (Caja Mágica - The Magic Box) and looking to expand and modernize existing sporting facilities. Bernabeu, and Estadio La Peineta were likely venues had Madrid won the games. A new center for sport with the aim of improving facilities for disabled athletes will also be created as part of the push for the Paralympic Games.

== Precedence ==
The Madrid bid had strong advantages that were publicly commented upon following the selection of Rio de Janeiro on 2 October 2009. The two previous geographic locations of the London 2012 Summer Olympics and the Sochi 2014 Winter Olympics put the Madrid bid at a disadvantage. This would have staged three consecutive Olympic games in Europe.

== See also ==
- Madrid bid for the 2012 Summer Olympics
- Madrid bid for the 2020 Summer Olympics
