= Nagoya bid for the 1988 Summer Olympics =

Bids for the 1988 Summer Olympics
Overview
- Games of the XXIV Olympiad

Details
- City: Nagoya, Japan
- NOC: JOC

Previous Games hosted
- none

Decision
- Result: Eliminated

Nagoya 1988 was one of the two short-listed bids for the 1988 Summer Olympic Games, and was to be held in Nagoya, Japan.

Nagoya was eliminated in the first round of the ballot to select a host city at the 84th IOC sitting in September 1981 in Baden-Baden, West Germany.

Ten years later, the city of Nagano was awarded to host the 1998 Winter Olympics. Nagoya is set to co-host the Asian Games with other towns and cities in Aichi Prefecture in 2026.

== Bid details ==
=== Proposed sport venues ===
- Peace Park Olympic Stadium - opening and closing ceremonies, football, athletics, equestrian
- Nagoya Gymnasium - boxing
- Aichi Shinrin Park (Owariasahi) - archery, equestrian, modern pentathlon
- Magai Dam (Sobue), or Jinnoshinden (Toyohashi), or Miyoshi & Toyoda - rowing and canoeing
- Nagoya Cycling Race Track - cycling
- Chukyo Race Course (Toyoake) - equestrian, modern pentathlon
- Fujioka Area Park Land (Fujioka) - equestrian
- Fukiage Hall - fencing, modern pentathlon
- Mizuho Athletic Stadium - football
- Ichinomiya Stadium (Ichinomiya) - football
- Toyohashi Stadium (Toyohashi) - football
- Yokkaichi Field Track and Field Ground (Yokkaichi) - football
- Olympic Gymnasium - volleyball, gymnastics
- Nagoya Central Gymnasium - handball
- Suzuka Gymnasium, or Yokkaichi Gymnasium - handball
- Tsuruma Park - hockey
- Oshikiri Park - hockey
- Asamiya park (Kasugai) - hockey
- Gifu Stadium - hockey
- Nagoya International Exhibition Centre - judo
- Hino Shooting Range (Gifu) - shooting, modern pentathlon
- Chunchi International Shooting Range (Fujioka), or Okazaki International Shooting Range - shooting
- Olympic Park Pool - swimming, diving, modern pentathlon
- Mizuho Swimming Pool - water polo
- Aichi Prefectural Gymnasium - basketball
- Okazaki Gymnasium - volleyball
- Gifu Gymnasium - volleyball
- Nagoya Sports Centre - weightlifting
- Toyota Gymnasium - wrestling
- Tsu Yacht Harbour, or Gamagōri Yacht Harbour - yachting

== Effects of a failed bid ==
Many TV stations in the region was preparing for the winner to be revealed. The Chubu Japanese Television was preparing a 3 hours broadcast from 0:35 AM, but it was shortened to 30 minutes following the elimination. There were many banners to celebrate Nagoya being selected for the 1988 olympics, but none of them were used due to the city being eliminated.

Aichi prefecture would aim to open the Expo 2005 as the first World's fair in the 21st century after the end of Seoul Olympics.

In 2009: Lost Memories, where Japanese rule in Korea survived until the modern age, the 1988 Summer Olympics were held in Nagoya.
