= Sport in Madrid =

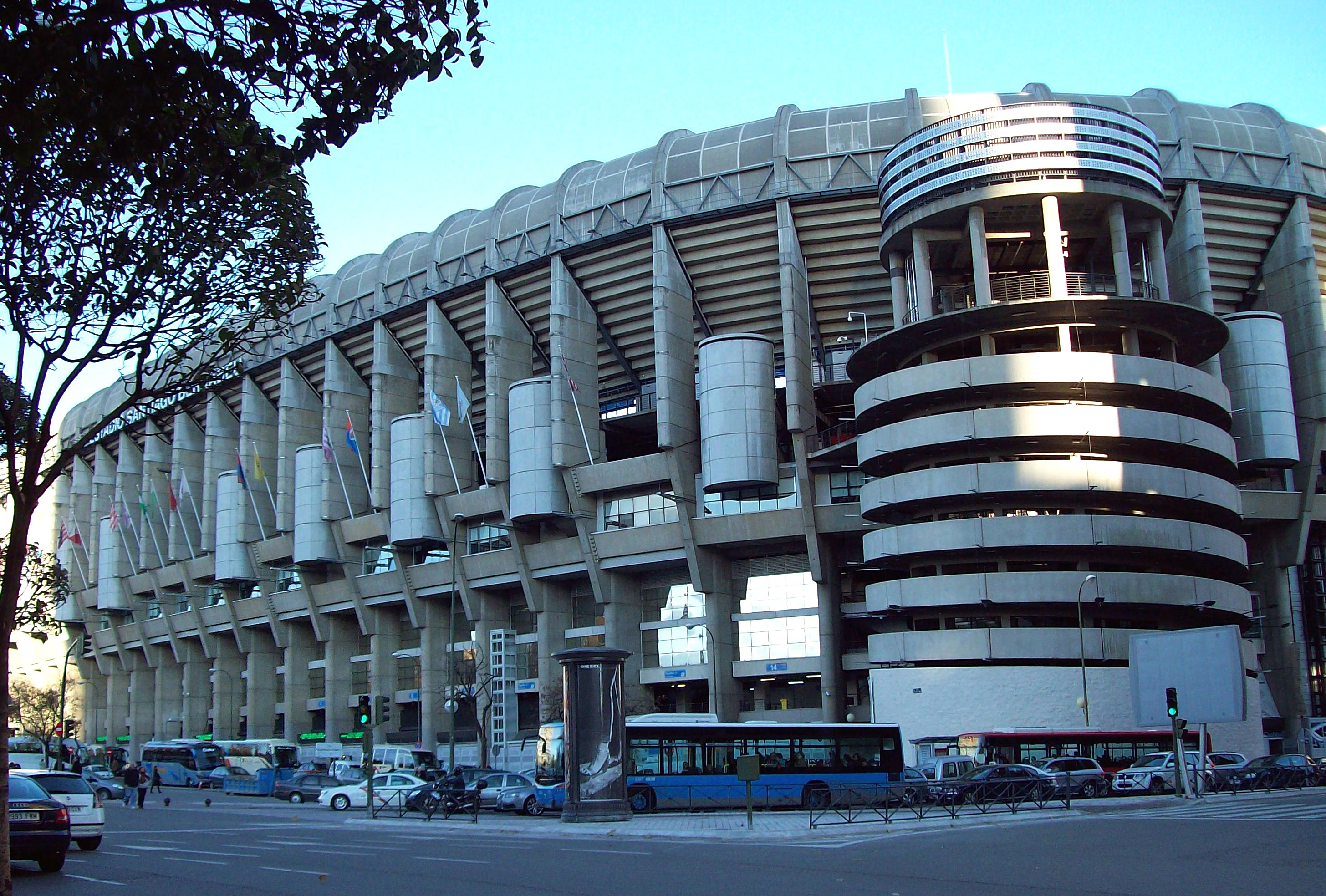
The Santiago Bernabéu, a FIFA elite stadium

Madrid is home to a number of football teams and other sports teams.

== History ==
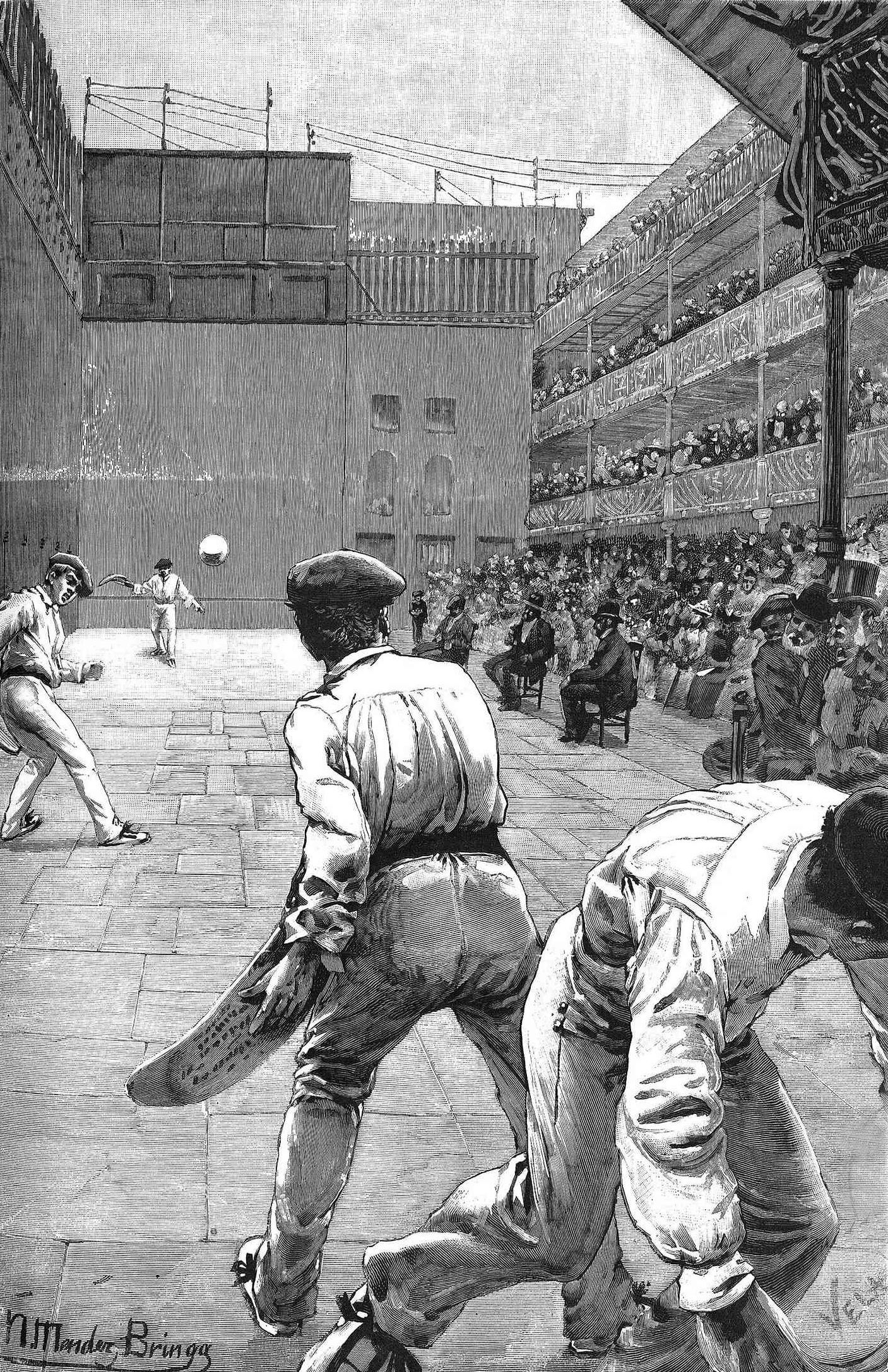
Jai Alai fronton in Madrid (1891)

As in most of the rest of Spanish cities, the sport in Madrid was restricted by the second half of the 19th century to the upper classes, who enjoyed, unlike the bulk of the population, spare time, thus the active sportspeople by the last third of the 19th century accounted for a limited number. Those sport practices included horse racing, hiking, polo, hunting, Basque pelota and fencing. No physical education was taught at schools.

The settling in Madrid of the Basque industrial and trading bourgeoise in the late 19th-century and the subsequent opening of several frontones led to the city becoming the world capital of pelota for a brief spell.

The importance of gymnastics and sports grew in line with regenerationist postulates spread after the disaster of 1898. Institución Libre de Enseñanza's pedagogue Manuel Bartolomé Cossío was reportedly the first to bring a football ball to Madrid.

Unlike other previous elite sport practices, football had more potential to spread among the rest of social classes. The parallel development of Sports journalism also helped to consolidate the sport in the city.

== Football ==
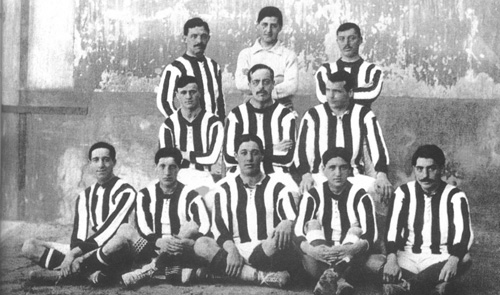
Atlético de Madrid players in 1911

Real Madrid, founded in 1902, compete in La Liga and play their home games at the Santiago Bernabéu Stadium. The club is one of the most widely supported teams in the world and their supporters are referred to as Madridistas or Merengues (Meringues). Real's supporters in Madrid are mostly upper-class citizens and conservatives. The club was selected as the best club of the 20th century, being the fifth most valuable sports club in the world and the most successful Spanish football club with a total of 104 official titles (this includes a record 15 European Cups and a record 36 La Liga trophies).

Atlético Madrid, founded in 1903, also compete in La Liga and play their home games at the Metropolitano Stadium. The club is well-supported in the city, having the third national fan base in Spain and their supporters are referred to as Atléticos or Colchoneros (The Mattressers). Atlético draws its support mostly from working class citizens. The club is considered an elite European team, having won three UEFA Europa League titles and reached three European Cup finals. Domestically, Atletico have won eleven league titles and ten Copa del Reys.

Rayo Vallecano are the third most important football team of the city, based in the Vallecas neighborhood. They currently compete in La Liga, having secured promotion in 2021. The club's fans tend to be very left-wing and are known as Buccaneers.

Madrid hosted five European Cup/Champions League finals, four at the Santiago Bernabéu, and the 2019 final at the Metropolitano. The Bernabéu also hosted the Euro 1964 Final (which Spain won) and 1982 FIFA World Cup final.

== Basketball ==
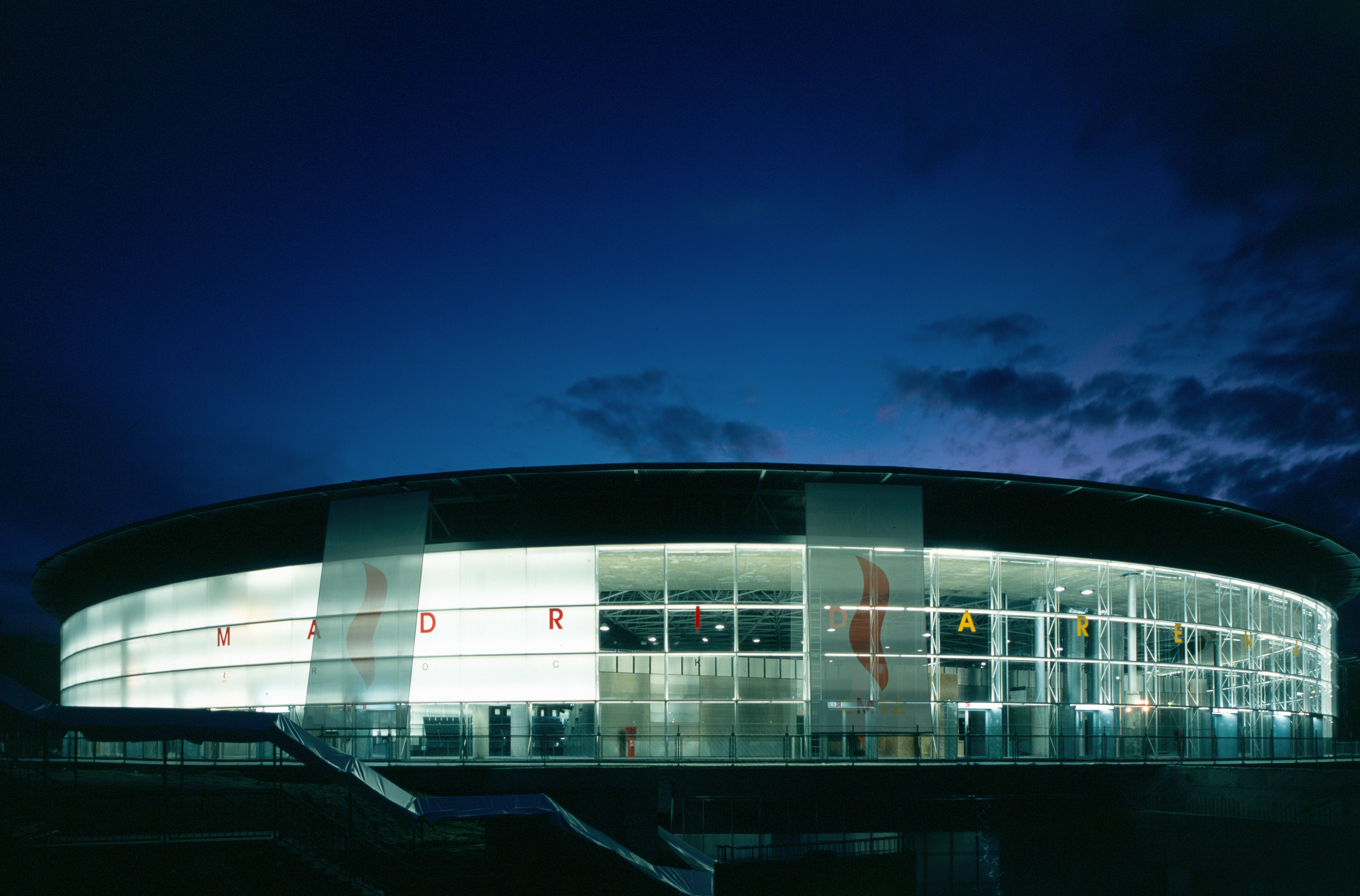
Madrid Arena exterior

Real Madrid Baloncesto, founded in 1931, compete in Liga ACB and play their home games at the Palacio de Deportes (WiZink Center). Real Madrid's basketball section, similarly to its football team, is the most successful team in Europe, with a record 10 EuroLeague titles. Domestically, they have clinched a record 36 league titles and a record 28 Copa del Reys.

Club Baloncesto Estudiantes, founded in 1948, compete in LEB Oro and also play their home games at the Palacio de Deportes (WiZink Center). Until 2021, Estudiantes was one of only three teams that have never been relegated from Spain's top division. Historically, its achievements include three cup titles and four league runners-up placements.

Madrid has hosted six European Cup/EuroLeague finals, the last two at the Palacio de Deportes. The city also hosted the final matches for the 1986 and 2014 FIBA World Cups, and the EuroBasket 2007 final (all held at the Palacio de Deportes).

== Tennis ==
Madrid hosts the Mutua Madrileña Madrid Open. The tournament is classified as an ATP Masters 1000 event on the Association of Tennis Professionals tour, and a WTA 1000 on the Women's Tennis Association tour. Caja Mágica (The Magic Box, and also known as the Manzanares Park Tennis Centre) is a tennis structure located at Manzanares Park, used for the Madrid Masters tournament, Caja Mágica is also home to the Spanish F1 team HRT F1 Team.

== Bullfighting ==
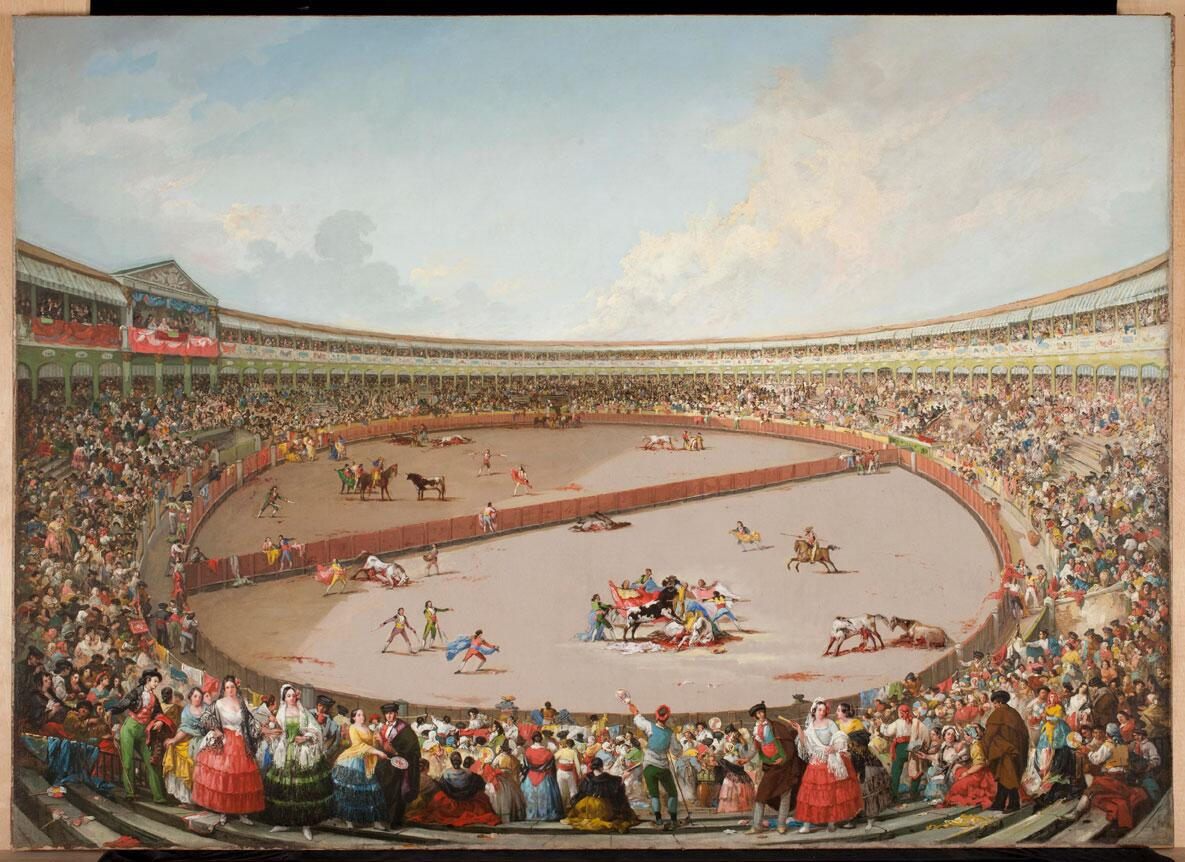
Alcalá Gate's bullring by Eugenio Lucas Velázquez (1853)

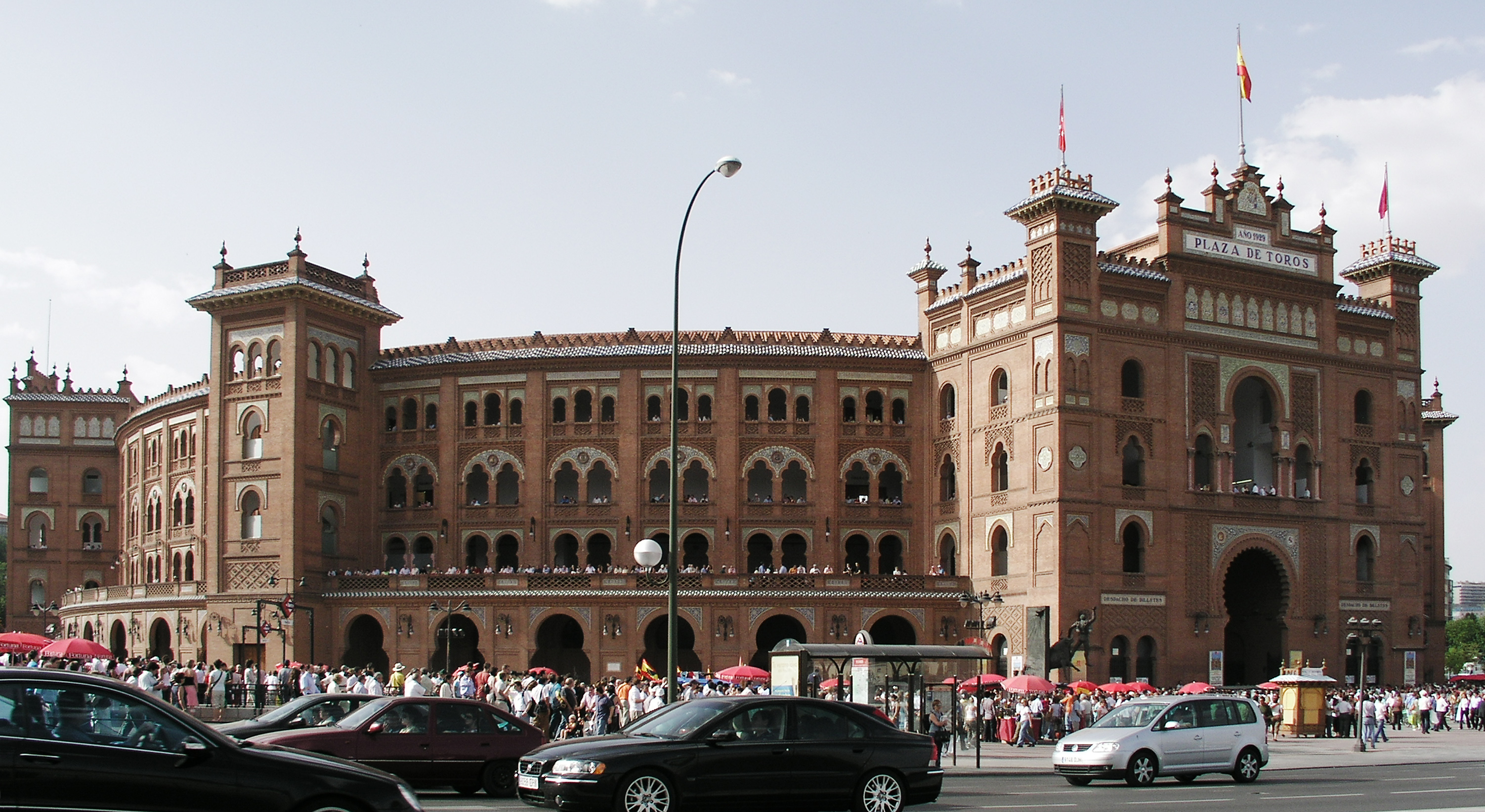
Las Ventas bullring

The first big bullring in the city, built in 1749 during the reign of Ferdinand VI, was located next to the puerta de Alcalá. It lasted until the 1870s, and it was replaced in 1874 by the bullring of Goya, located in the plot currently occupied by the Palacio de los Deportes.

Madrid currently hosts the largest plaza de toros (bullring) in Spain, Las Ventas, established in 1929. Las Ventas is considered by many to be the world centre of bullfighting and has a seating capacity of almost 25,000. Madrid's bullfighting season begins in March and ends in October. Bullfights are held every day during the festivities of San Isidro (Madrid's patron saint) from mid May to early June, and every Sunday, and public holiday, the rest of the season. The style of the plaza is Neo-Mudéjar. Las Ventas also hosts music concerts and other events outside of the bullfighting season.

== Cycling ==
Historically, the city serves as the final stage of the Vuelta a España cycling event, in the same way Paris serves as the conclusive stage of the Tour de France.

== Motorsport ==
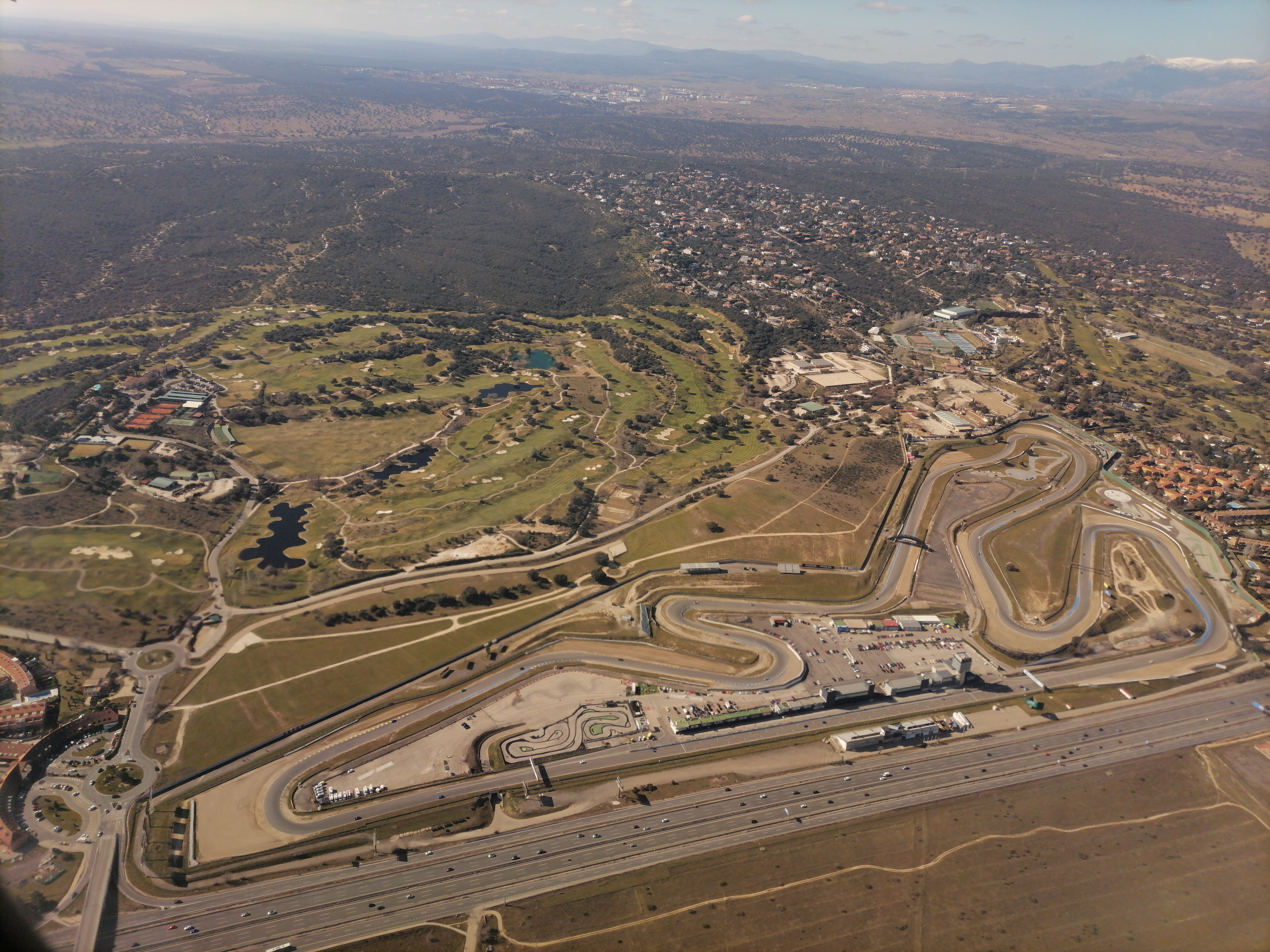
Aerial image of Circuito del Jarama in 2023

The track layout of the Madring as used for the Spanish Grand Prix

The Community of Madrid had previously hosted nine Formula One Spanish Grand Prix's between 1968 and 1981, with the events taking place at Circuito del Jarama in San Sebastián de los Reyes.

In January 2024, Formula One announced that Madrid would return to host the 2026 Spanish Grand Prix, as part of a 10-year contract that lasts until 2035. The circuit was planned to be built around the IFEMA exhibition centre, which is located in the Barajas district within the city. The track is 5.414 km (3.364 mi) long, and features 22 corners – including a 24-degree banked corner which is named "La Monumental".

In June 2025, Formula E also announced that Circuito del Jarama would host the 2026 Madrid ePrix, and the first ePrix in Spain in five years. Previously, Valencia's Circuit Ricardo Tormo had hosted a doubleheader weekend for the championship in 2021.

Rally driver and four-time Dakar Rally winner Carlos Sainz Sr., as well as his son, Carlos Sainz Jr., current Formula One driver for Williams and formerly Ferrari, are both from Madrid.

== Events hosted ==
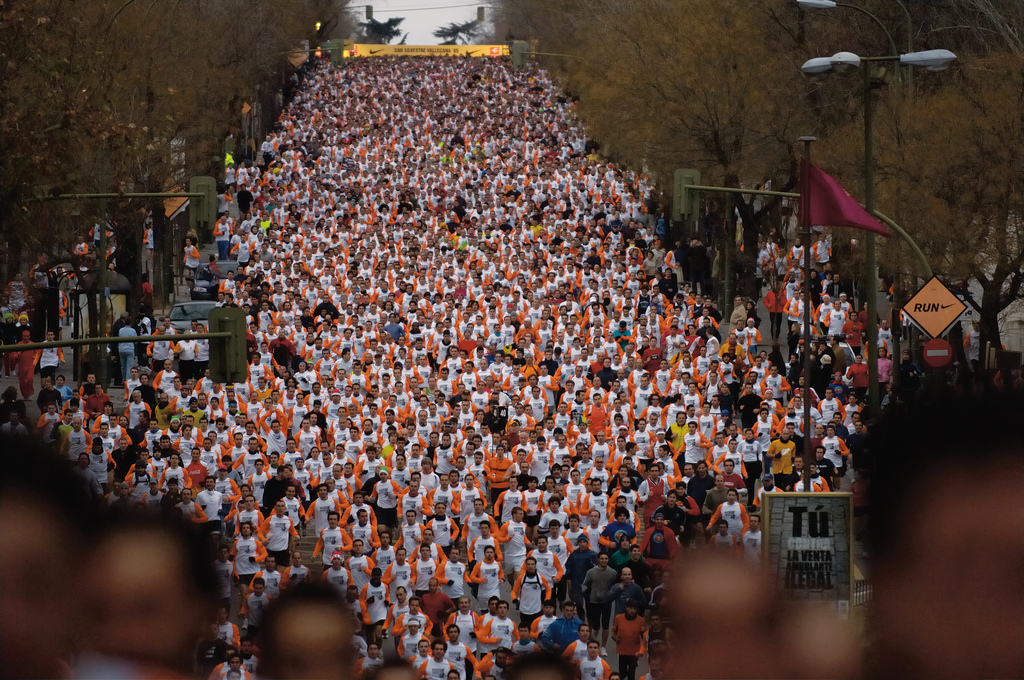
San Silvestre Vallecana (31 December 2005)

The city has two major annual road running events – the Madrid Marathon and the San Silvestre Vallecana 10 km (6 mi) run – tens of thousands of runners take part in these races each year. As reported by Olympic news outlet Around the Rings,

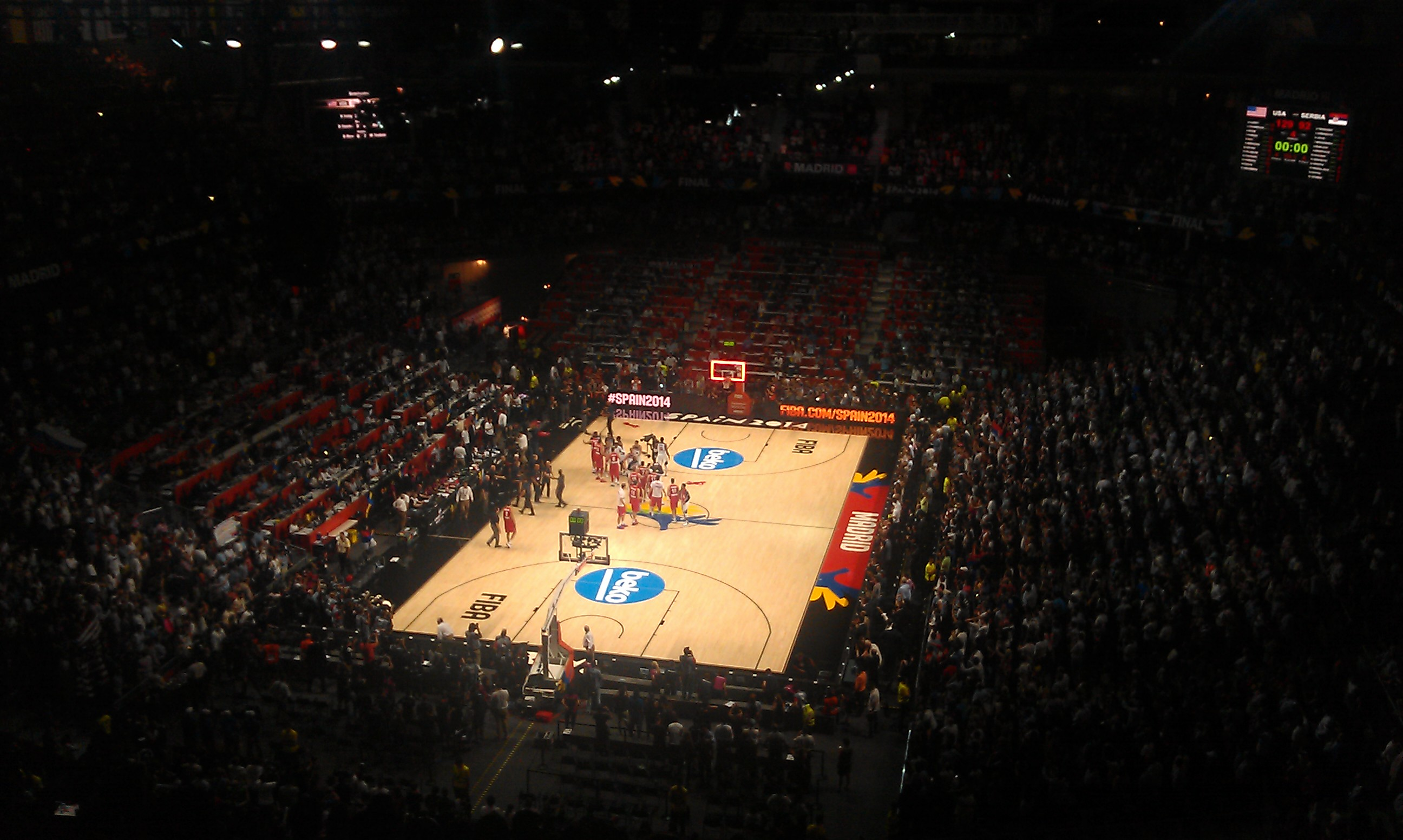
The 2014 FIBA Basketball World Cup Final at the Palacio de Deportes

Spain hosted the 1982 FIFA World Cup and the final was held in Madrid. It has also hosted the UEFA Champions League finals (1957, 1969, 1980 and 2010); UEFA Cup finals (1985 and 1986); FIBA EuroBasket finals (several times); 1974 EuroHockey Nations Championship; European Judo Championships (1965, 1973, 1981); 2005 UCI Road World Championships; European Karate Championships (1983, 1986); 2005 World Taekwondo Championships; 2002 World Cup in Athletics; Intercontinental Cup (1960, 1966, 1974); 2004 European Aquatics Championships; UEFA Euro 1964; 2003 FIVB Volleyball World League; European Athletics Indoor Championships (1968, 1986, 2005); UCI Mountain Bike World Cup (every year); WTA Tour Championships (2006, 2007); Spanish International Badminton Tournament (every year); 1986 World Aquatics Championships and several other. In addition, Spain hosted the 1986 FIBA World Championship and the 2014 FIBA World Cup, with the final matches of both tournaments held at the Palacio de Deportes de la Comunidad de Madrid in Madrid.

== Olympics bids ==
The history of Madrid's bid to host the Olympic Games dates back to December 29, 1965 when the Spanish government presented a joint bid Madrid-Barcelona to the International Olympic Committee (IOC) to host the 20th edition of the Games in 1972. The Spanish candidature was however ruled out at the IOC session held in Rome on 26 April 1966, where Munich was ultimately elected.

Many years later, Madrid's council presented a bid to host the 2012 Summer Olympics. The candidate city logo was designed by Javier Mariscal, a Spanish artist who also designed the mascot for the Barcelona 1992 Olympic Games. On May 18, 2004 the IOC selected in Lausanne (Switzerland) the five official candidate cities for the organization of the Olympic Games of 2012: Madrid, Paris, London, New York and Moscow. On July 6, 2005, the IOC announced the result of the election of the city that would host the 2012 Olympics: the choice was London, and the city of Madrid finished third. Later, an IOC member told reporters he made a mistake when marking his vote, so Madrid was eliminated in the penultimate voting. During the selection process for the 2012 Summer Olympics, there was among Madrid citizens a minority social movement of opposition to the nomination, which was accused of favoring real estate speculation and increase the already high indebtedness of the council.

The Spanish Olympic Committee renewed on May 30, 2007 the Madrid bid for the 2016 Summer Olympics. On June 4, 2008 Madrid was shortlisted as one of the candidates to host the 2016 Games, along with Chicago, Tokyo and Rio de Janeiro. The project presented was based on the prior application with improvements, which allowed him to be the second city with the highest rating, slightly behind Tokyo. Finally, on October 2, 2009 the city of Rio de Janeiro won the election, despite having initially a general technical assessment below that of the other three cities.

Madrid resubmitted an application to host the games in 2020. The IOC selected Madrid as candidate city on May 23, 2012. On September 7, 2013 the candidate cities were Madrid, Istanbul and Tokyo. On the first ballot Madrid and Istanbul yielded the same votes after Tokyo. In the runoff vote, Madrid was eliminated and in the final vote, Tokyo won by a large number of votes.

Following Madrid's failure to secure the 2020 Summer Olympics, it was confirmed the city would not be bidding for the 2024 Games.

== Teams ==
Club	League	Sport	Venue	Established	Capacity
Real Madrid CF	La Liga	Football	Santiago Bernabéu	1902	85,454
Atlético Madrid	La Liga	Football	Wanda Metropolitano	1903	67,703
Rayo Vallecano	La Liga	Football	Estadio de Vallecas	1924	15,500
Real Madrid Castilla	La Liga	Football	Alfredo di Stéfano	1930	6,000
Real Madrid Baloncesto	Liga ACB	Basketball	Palacio de Deportes de Madrid	1931	17,453
CB Estudiantes	Liga ACB	Basketball	Palacio de Deportes de Madrid	1948	17,453

== See also ==
- Sport in Spain
