= 117th IOC Session =

117th International Olympic Committee Session held in Singapore from 2 to 9 July 2005

The 117th International Olympic Committee Session was held for the first time in Singapore from 2 to 9 July 2005. Two important decisions were made through voting during the session – namely the selection of the hosting city for the 2012 Summer Olympics, and a review of the 28 sports currently represented in the summer games.

The session was held at the Raffles City Convention Centre, which is on level 4 of the Raffles City complex. The opening ceremony on 5 July 2005 was held at the Esplanade – Theatres on the Bay.

Logo of the 117th IOC Session, Singapore.

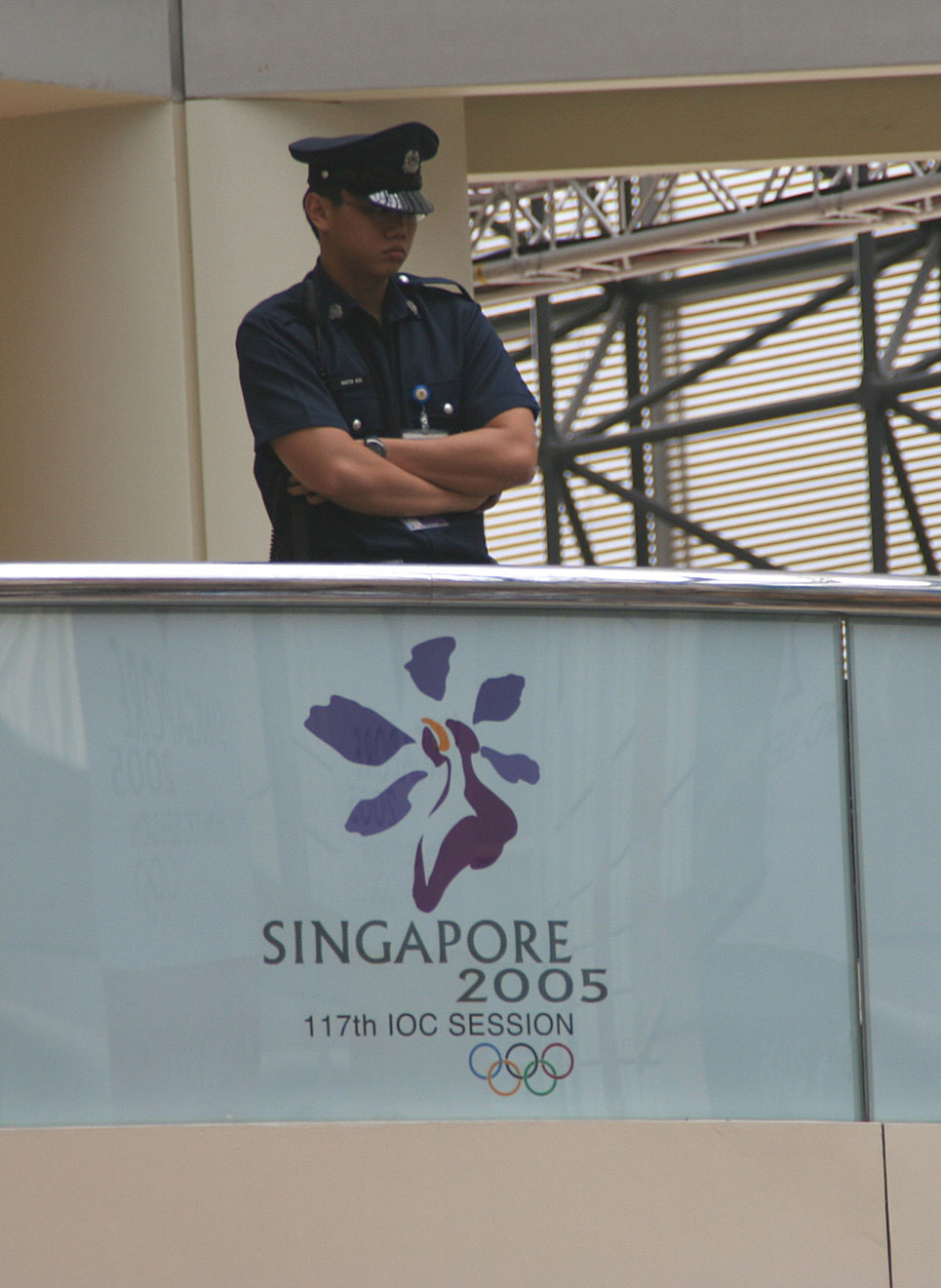
Tight security was highly visible during the 117th IOC Session. A police officer stood watch on the fourth floor of the Raffles City complex where the session was taking place.

== Proceedings ==
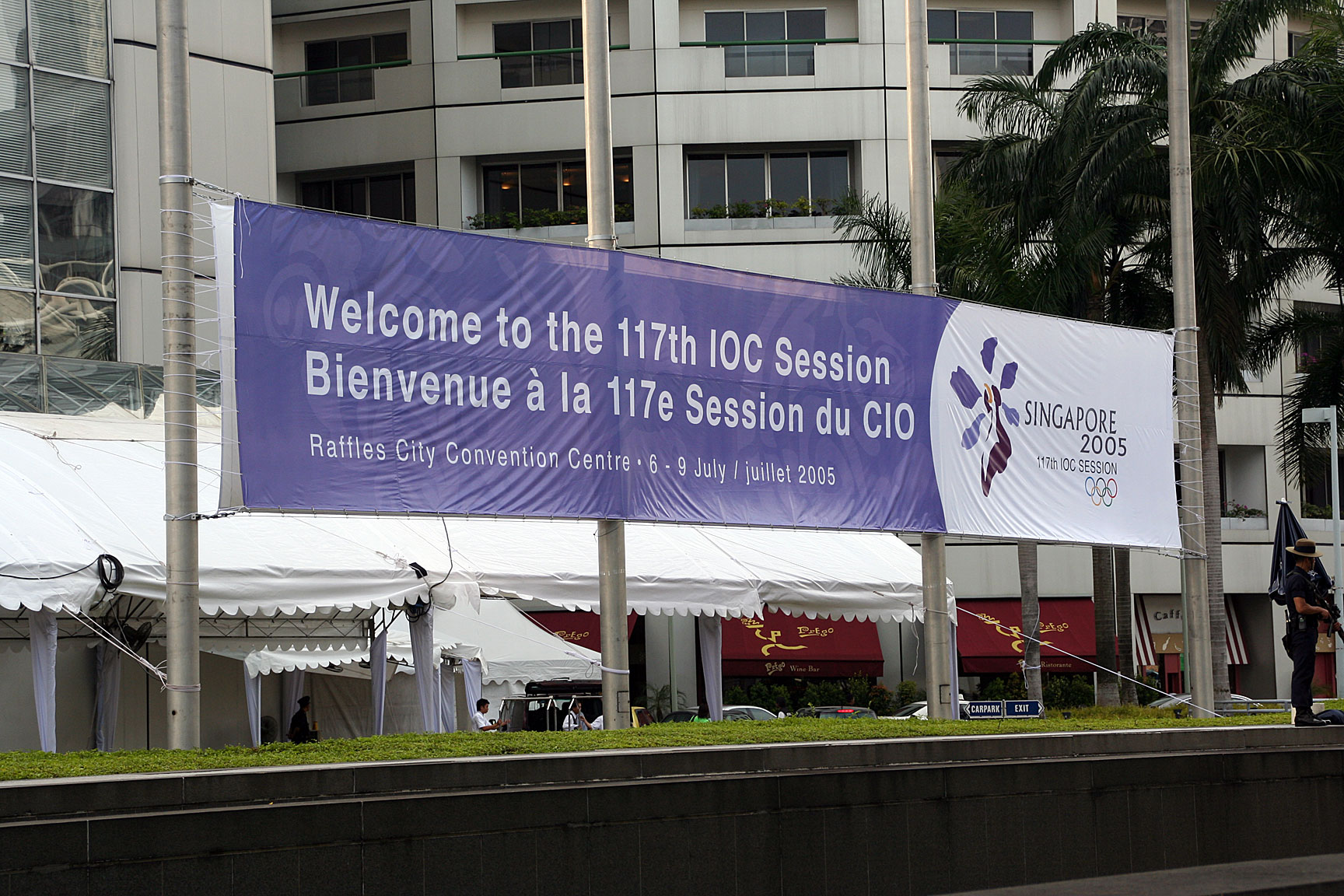
Banner of the 117th IOC Session outside the venue at Raffles City

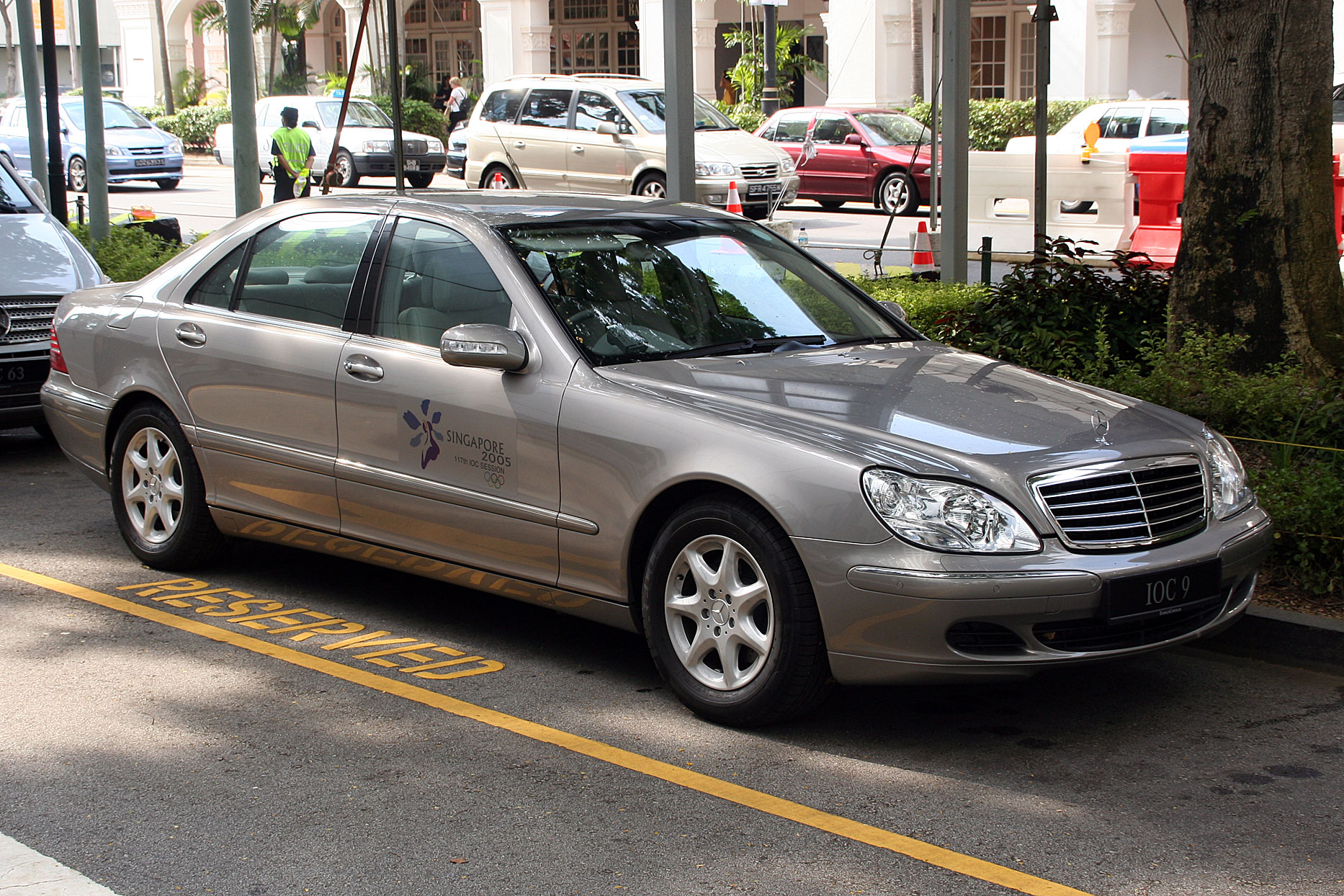
Official car sponsored by Mercedes-Benz

=== 1 July 2005 ===
An exhibition was launched at the podium of the Raffles City Shopping Complex, that would continue until 10 July.

=== 2 July 2005 ===
The IOC Session commenced.

=== 3 July 2005 ===
The IOC's executive board started two days of meetings.

=== 4 July 2005 ===
The executive board meetings resumed with updates on the progress of preparations for the 2006 Winter Olympics in Turin, 2008 Summer Olympics in Beijing and 2010 Winter Olympics in Vancouver by their respective representatives. The board approved Beijing's request to hold the equestrian events in Hong Kong, which is a separate NOC from mainland China in the "best interests of the competition and the well-being of the horses".

=== 5 July 2005 ===
The opening ceremony was held at the Esplanade - Theatres on the Bay and the guest of honour was the Prime Minister of Singapore, Lee Hsien Loong, who officially opened the session. A special type of hybrid orchid had been bred to commemorate the IOC Session in Singapore. It was named Vanda IOC. A cultural performance of dance and songs was held with the theme of "One Voice, One Rhythm, One World".

The ceremony was attended by IOC members and more than 2,000 other guests, included many foreign leaders (it was the most prolific IOC event in history) :

- United Nations Commissioner Adolf Ogi
- Singapore Prime Minister Lee Hsien Loong
- France President Jacques Chirac
- United Kingdom Prime Minister Tony Blair
- Russia Prime Minister Mikhail Fradkov
- Spain Prime Minister José Luis Rodríguez Zapatero
- United States Former First Lady Hillary Clinton
- Monaco Prince Albert II
- Luxembourg Grand Duke Henri
- Denmark Crown Prince Frederik
- IOC President Jacques Rogge and former President Juan Antonio Samaranch

=== 6 July 2005: 2012 Olympic host city election ===
Each of the five bid cities had 45 minutes to make a final presentation to the IOC members, after which voting commenced and the final results were announced at 19:30 Singapore time. Local sailor Griselda Khng was handed an envelope by chief scrutineer Thomas Bach, holding the result of the vote, to give to IOC president Jacques Rogge, who announced: "The International Olympic Committee has the honor of announcing, that the games of the 30th Olympiad, in 2012, are awarded to the city of London."

The result of the vote was as follows:

2012 Host City Election – ballot results
City	NOC	Round 1	Round 2	Round 3	Round 4
London	Great Britain	22	27	39	54
Paris	France	21	25	33	50
Madrid	Spain	20	32	31	—
New York City	United States	19	16	—	—
Moscow	Russia	15	—	—	—

=== 7 July 2005 ===
The final evaluation report of the 2004 Summer Olympics in Athens was presented and the Athens Games were finally closed. Reports on the progress of preparations for future Games were also submitted.

=== 8 July 2005: Review of Olympic sports ===
The 28 sports in the Summer Olympics programme that existed at that time were all put up on the ballots, three years after a similar attempt failed to gain support from IOC members during the 114th IOC Session in Mexico City. Prior to the voting, baseball, softball, modern pentathlon, taekwondo and fencing were considered as most likely to be dropped. Five non-Olympic sports would then be voted to get in, in case any of the existing sports would be dropped, as IOC rules allow a maximum of 28 Summer Olympic sports. These sports – golf, roller sports, squash, rugby and karate – were recommended by the IOC Olympic Games Program Committee, which has shortlisted the sports that applied to be included. Golf and rugby were considered the favorites to be voted in, both mainly for their popularity and also for their relatively small number of events (each one, if accepted, would have consisted of 2 events).

IOC President Jacques Rogge has been a keen supportive of this move, which was one of his agendas since being elected in 2001, while the Association of Summer Olympic International Federations (ASOIF) said changing the current set of 28 sports risked changing the "magic combination of team sports and individual sports", attributing one of the success factors of the Olympic games to the current programme.

A few days before the votes were cast, the IOC accepted the ASOIF request that the number of votes given for each sport will not be published, only "yay" or "nay". The reason given for the unusual request was in order to avoid a "popularity ranking" of all Olympic sports. Any sport that would get a simple majority of "nay" would be dropped from the Olympic program in 2012, but would remain eligible for readmission in future Games.

In the morning IOC members voted to remove baseball and softball from the games. The decision has triggered dismay in some nations such as the United States where both sports originated from, and Canada, where both have a strong following. Some attributed the exclusion of baseball to the fact that Major League Baseball did not allow its players to participate in the Olympics, held during the season (unlike the National Hockey League that allowed it since the 1998 Winter Olympics) and the widespread use of prohibited drugs in the professional leagues. The main reason for exclusion of softball was that it was included as a women-only sport mainly to be a gender-equalizer bat-and-ball sport for baseball (men-only sport), and with baseball out this reasoning no longer existed. Another reason given was that both sports consist of large teams and their elimination will make room for many athletes, in comparison to modern pentathlon, for example, which only consist of 64 athletes.

In the afternoon, a secret vote by IOC members gave squash and karate over 51% of votes, but a subsequent vote to include them in the list of Olympic sports in the Olympic Charter has failed to get the necessary two-thirds majority needed for such amendment. Therefore, by the end of the day two sports were dropped and none added, and the program of the 2012 Summer Olympics was reduced to 26 sports.

That night at The Oriental Singapore, then SNOC president and defence minister, Teo Chee Hean threw a banquet. Rogge gave Singapore full marks for the session organisation, a perfect 6.

=== 9 July 2005 ===
Lambis Nikolaou of Greece and Chiharu Igaya from Japan were elected as Vice presidents. Singapore's IOC member, Ng Ser Miang was elected to the IOC Executive Board to replace Nikolaou, whose term as board member was due to expire.

== Olympic Anthem criticism ==
The trio who sung the Olympic Hymn in Greek was criticised by both the media and the audience. They were Singaporean soprano Khor Ai Ming, Singaporean tenor William Lim and Japanese soprano Satsuki Nagatome. The trio sung with gusto just before the announcement of the 2012 Summer Olympics.

The Guardian reported on their operatic rendition "Two Singaporean sopranos and a tenor dressed like a maître d' subjected the Olympic anthem, a tune whose primary virtue is to be heard only once every four years, to a fearful mauling." The Times of the UK described them as "three Orientals... one distinctly off key".

== See also ==
- List of IOC meetings
- 121st IOC Session
- 2010 Summer Youth Olympics
