= Madrid bid for the 2012 Summer Olympics =

2012 Olympic bid for Spain, Madrid

Bids for the 2012 Summer Olympics and Paralympics
Overview
- Games of the XXX Olympiad; XIV Paralympic Games
- Winner: London; Runner-up: Paris; Shortlist: Madrid · Moscow · New York City

Details
- City: Madrid, Spain
- NOC: Spanish Olympic Committee

Evaluation
- IOC score: 8.3

Previous Games hosted
- None • Bid for 1972

Decision
- Result: Eliminated in Round 3

Madrid 2012 was one of the five short-listed bids for the 2012 Summer Games. Madrid and New York City were the only two cities that opted to hold the 2012 Olympics that had never held a Summer Olympics before. The candidacy celebration, held on June 5, 2005, in central Madrid, included the carrying of the longest flag ever constructed through the streets of Madrid using over a thousand volunteering citizens of Madrid as well as a performance by pop singer Shakira. The celebration concluded with a fireworks show. The official slogan of the candidacy campaign was, "Ready for you."

Madrid was eliminated in the third round of the ballot to select a host city at the 117th IOC sitting on July 6, 2005, in Singapore attended by Queen Sofía of Spain.

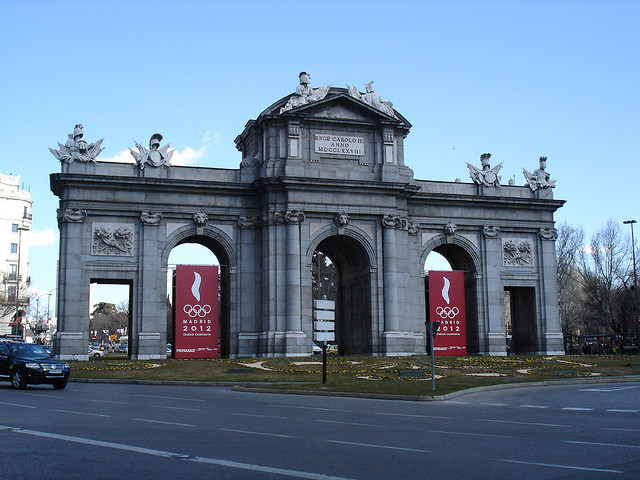
Banners of Madrid's bid for the 2012 Olympics in Puerta de Alcalá.

== International Olympic Committee evaluation report ==
The candidature scored the second highest mark of 8.3 in the IOC report, ranking first in six categories. Their evaluation was mostly favourable.

Madrid has proposed humanist, sustainable, and environmentally friendly Games. Madrid is a modern city intent on using the Olympic project to further develop high-quality sports facilities and world-class infrastructure. The legacy plans are positive and the environmental benefits are significant. Venues have strong environmental features. While low in technology and transport, the budget appears to be reasonable and achievable. The concept and location of the Olympic Village within the East cluster are good. Some revision to the design and layout of the village would be required to ensure conformity with IOC requirements. Spain has a history of international leadership in sport for the disabled, and a Madrid Paralympic Games would give high priority to accessibility for athletes and the general public. Overall, Olympic plans are well integrated into the long-term development of the city. Madrid may need to use hotels in cities approximately one hour away by high-speed rail in order to meet Olympic requirements and spectator needs.

== See also ==
- Madrid bid for the 2016 Summer Olympics
- Madrid bid for the 2020 Summer Olympics
