= Paris bid for the 2012 Summer Olympics =

Failed bid to host Games of the XXX Olympiad

Bids for the 2012 Summer Olympics and Paralympics
Overview
- Games of the XXX Olympiad; XIV Paralympic Games
- Winner: London; Runner-up: Paris; Shortlist: Madrid · Moscow · New York City

Details
- City: Paris, France
- NOC: French National Olympic Committee

Evaluation
- IOC score: 8.5

Previous Games hosted
- 1900 Summer Olympics; 1924 Summer Olympics

Decision
- Result: First runner-up (50 votes)

Paris 2012 was an unsuccessful bid for the 2012 Summer Olympics to be held in Paris. The bidding race was eventually won by the London 2012 bid after a 54–50 vote of the International Olympic Committee (IOC) on 6 July 2005. The French capital's failure to win the 2012 games follows the attempts of the Paris 2008 and Paris 1992 bids.

== Organisation ==
=== The Paris 2012 Committee ===
The French National Olympic Committee (French: Le Comité National Olympique et Sportif Français (CNOSF)), the city of Paris, the Île-de-France region and France itself formed a public interest group called "Paris-Île-de-France 2012". Chaired by Bertrand Delanoë, Mayor of Paris, the group was responsible for supporting and promoting Paris' bid.

== International Olympic Committee evaluation report ==
The IOC gave the Paris 2012 bid almost universal praise, as shown in the following excerpt from their evaluation:

Paris has based its vision on the long-standing relationship between Olympism and France and has planned athlete-centered Games. Paris has committed to providing a legacy to the city, the region, French athletes and the community generally. The Olympic Village would provide a significant new housing opportunity for inner Paris. The Paralympic Games are well integrated into the planning of Paris 2012. Overall, the environmental actions are comprehensive, innovative and integrated throughout planning and operations, and would result in significant gains and legacies from the Games. The budget has been professionally prepared with great detail. Assumptions for the budget are well supported and documented. Paris has extensive, well maintained and operated metropolitan road and rail transport systems. Paris has a rich cultural heritage with regard to Olympism. The candidature file and the information provided to the Commission during its visit were of a very high quality.

== Important dates ==
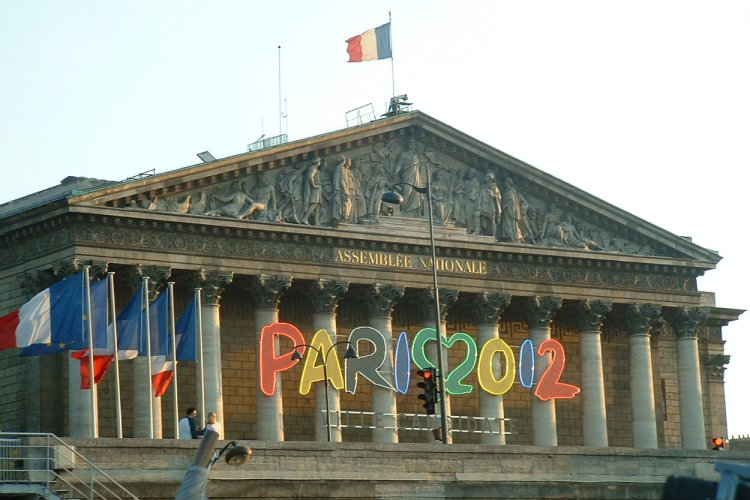
The logo of the Paris 2012 bid on the front of the Assemblée Nationale in Paris

- 21 May 2003: Paris' Mayor, Bertrand Delanoë announces official candidature of Paris "Nous requérons l'honneur d'organiser les jeux olympiques de 2012. Nous sommes là pour gagner. [We seek the honour of organising the Olympic Games of 2012. We are here to win.]"
- November 2004: a large "pin' S" is installed on Eiffel Tower with the colours of Paris 2012.
- 6 January 2005: several monuments and bridges of Paris are lit with the colours of the Olympic rings (green, yellow, red and blue) in honour of the Parisian candidacy: Palais Bourbon which lodges the National Assembly (left bank), Paris City Hall (right bank), the Eiffel Tower, and four bridges of the Seine Marie Bridge, Bridge of the Harmony, Michaelmas Bridge and footbridge Debilly will display the logo of Paris 2012 until 6 July 2005.
- 9 to 12 March 2005: Paris is visited by the IOC Evaluation Commission
- 5 June 2005: Champs-Élysées is transformed into a big sports ground.
- 6 July 2005: Nomination of Candidature of the Olympic Games received by the 120 members of the IOC at a ceremony in Singapore.

== Candidates' file ==
=== Dates ===
The Paris organizing committee proposed to hold the games from 27 July to 12 August 2012. These dates offer the most favorable climatic conditions for the athletes.

=== Finance ===
Paris proposed that the organizing committee for the games (OCOG) would need US$2.65 billion to run and prepare for the games. Non-OCOG budgeting would include US$2.2 billion specifically for the games and another US$6 billion for general infrastructure enhancements over a longer period of time.

The national, regional, and local governments are all committed to funding the games, and the national government says that it will cover any shortfall the Paris OCOG experiences.

=== The Olympic village ===
The goal was to place the 17,000 athletes and guides under the best conditions in the middle of the Games. The "one village, two cores" concept of the Paris 2012 bid would have placed the Olympic and Paralympic village in Paris only 6 kilometres from the two cores of competition venues that would have been used for 80% of the events. The "Olympic Ways", in the immediate vicinity, would have made it possible to guarantee the effectiveness and efficiency of transportation; according to the bid team, it would have taken less than ten minutes to reach either of the venue clusters. The village would have been placed in the north-west of Paris, in the 17th arrondissement on an industrial wasteland belonging to the SNCF.

=== Venues ===
The venue concept for the Paris bid was focused around two principal clusters, a Northern core around the Stade de France and a Western core established around the Stade Roland Garros . Sixteen additional venues (including 11 temporary ones) were to be constructed for the Games.

==== Northern Core ====
- Stade de France
- Aquatics center
- SuperDôme (for gymnastics)
- House 1
- House 2
- House 3
- House 4
- House 5
- House 6

==== Western Core ====
- Stade Roland Garros
- Stade du Parc des Princes
- Stade Jean-Bouin
- Dome
- Hippodrome de Longchamp
- Croix Catelan
- Hippodrome d'Auteuil
- House 7

==== Other sites in Paris ====
- Eiffel Tower
- Champ de Mars
- Palais Omnisports de Paris-Bercy
- Rowing course of Vaires-sur-Marne
- Cycle-racing track of Saint-Quentin-en-Yvelines
- Park of Saint-Quentin-en-Yvelines
- Palace of Versailles
- Shooting centre of Versailles
- Sporting centre of Doves

==== Elsewhere in France ====
- Port of La Rochelle
- Stade Vélodrome in Marseille
- Stade Gerland in Lyon
- Stade de la Beaujoire in Nantes
- Stade Félix Bollaert in Lens

== Olympic Torch Relay ==
The Paris 2012 Olympic Torch Relay would begin 100 days before the opening ceremony and the relay route would carry the flame from Olympia, Greece to the Île-de-France region and the city of Paris. The route was to include the other cities in France hosting Olympic competitions (La Rochelle, Marseille, Lyon, Nantes and Lens) and all other major cities in France. It was to highlight the diversity of the nation’s landscapes and cultures as well as celebrate the international guests taking part in the Games. The torch relay was to be the foundation for the international celebration that follows and thrill millions of children and adults in its course across France, heightening their anticipation to watch or be part of the Games.

A significant portion of the torch relay was to take place outside France. This international part of the route was to be organised in partnership with the IOC.

Details of all programmes of torch relay celebrations across all 13 regions of France were to be submitted in January 2011, at the earliest.

== Previous bids ==
It is the third time in recent years that Paris has sought hosting rights for the Olympic Games.

- In 1986, Barcelona was chosen to host the 1992 Games; France was however subsequently selected to organise the 1992 Winter Games at Albertville.
- In 2001, Beijing was selected for the 2008 Games; Paris finished 3rd behind Beijing and Toronto, (Canada).

== Competition with London ==
The IOC's decision to hold the 2012 Games in London was a massive blow to France, due to this being Paris' third failed attempt to host the Olympic Games in the previous twenty years. Throughout Paris' 2012 bid, great emphasis was placed on France's love and passion for sport. Two previous failures to host the Games led many to believe that Paris had learnt from its mistakes, and would produce a strong bid that would not be easily challenged. This remained the case throughout much of the process, as Paris was almost always the favourite to win.

However, the final decision was between London and Paris, the largest cities and capitals of the United Kingdom and France, two nations with a history of rivalry. The decision of either Paris or London for 2012 would also be historic, as either city would have become the first city to host the Olympic Games three times (London hosted the Games in 1908 and 1948, whilst Paris hosted in 1900 and 1924).

There was a huge outcry in Paris when the French capital was rejected yet again to host the Olympic Games. A sense of disbelief swept across crowds of French sports fans, who had always remained confident that they would win. This victory for the British capital has given them the first 100% track record, for bidding and hosting the Olympic Games three times. This is as their previous bids were also successful, while Paris currently holds a 40% track record, for bidding and hosting the Olympic Games.

== Aftermath and Future Bids ==
Paris hosted the 2024 Summer Olympics after all other candidate cities eventually pulled out of the bidding process. They were considering a bid for the 2020 Summer Olympics, but decided to wait until 2024. Hosting in 2024 marks 100 years since Paris hosted the 1924 Summer Olympics, which was the last time they hosted. Paris is the second city to host the Olympics three times after hosting in 2024. London became the first city to host three times when they hosted in 2012. Los Angeles will become the third city to host the Olympics three times when they host the 2028 Summer Olympics.

The London 2012 Games meant that it would be unlikely, that Paris would host the Olympics soon after 2012. This was due to Paris' close proximity to London, and that the Games would have been held in Europe twice in eight years (see: Athens 2004). Paris is hosting the 2024 Olympics - twelve years since London hosted the 2012 Olympics.

On 15 October 2014, Prime Minister Manuel Valls declared that the city would bid for the World's Fair of 2025, prompting concerns that Paris would no longer submit an application for the Olympics. However, no city official had stated that this would affect Paris' 2024 Olympic bid.

On 8 November 2014 the mayor of Paris, Anne Hidalgo approached the possible 2024 Olympic bid with caution, suggesting that the city might not be able to afford to put itself forward as host, saying: "We are in a financial and budgetary position today that does not allow me to say that I am making this bid." In addition she also talked about a potential bid for the 2028 Summer Olympics. On 13 April 2015, the council of Paris officially voted and approved the candidacy making Paris an official applicant. Nonetheless, Paris still went ahead with their 2024 Olympic bid and it enjoyed strong support from the Mayor.

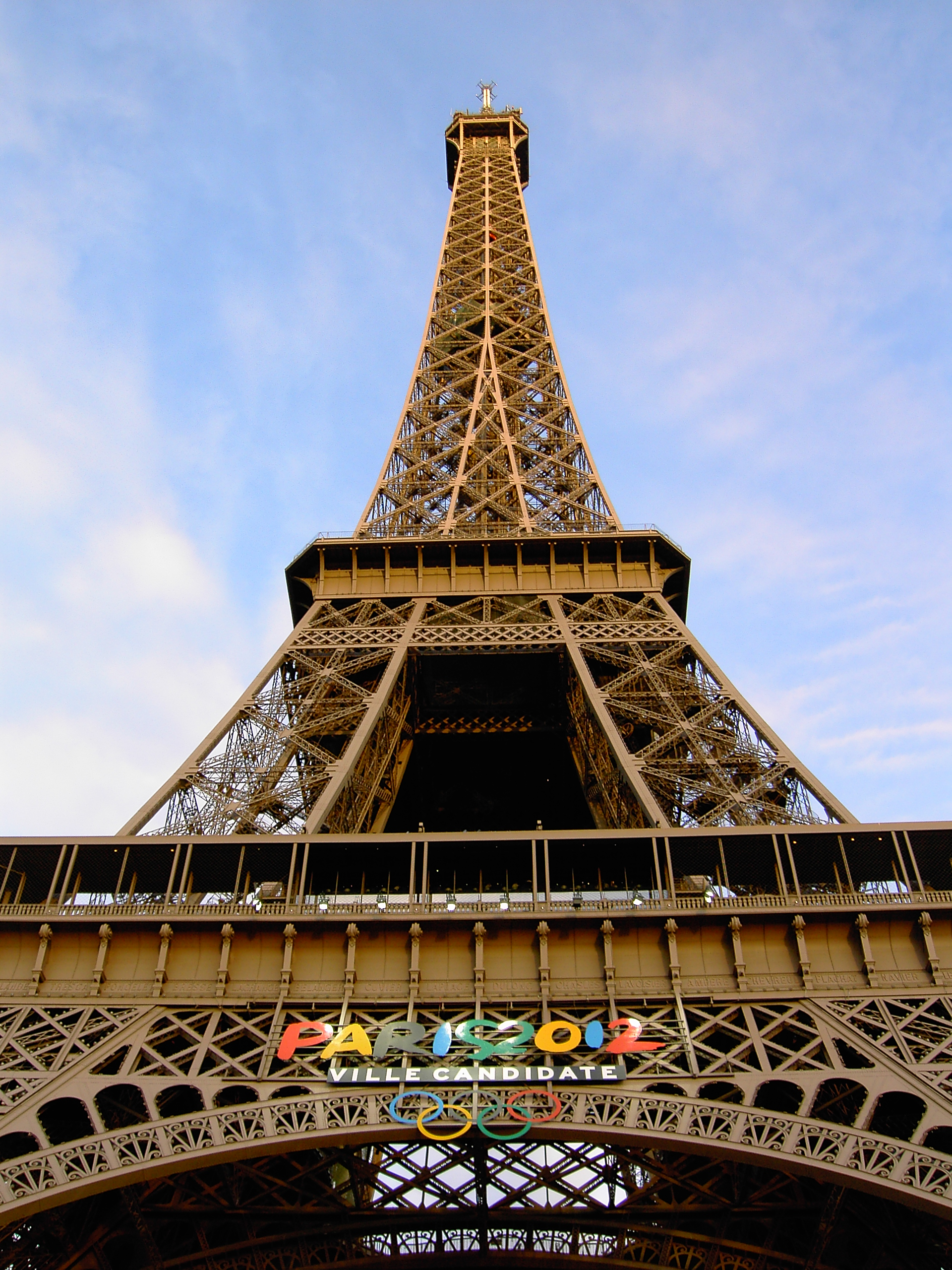

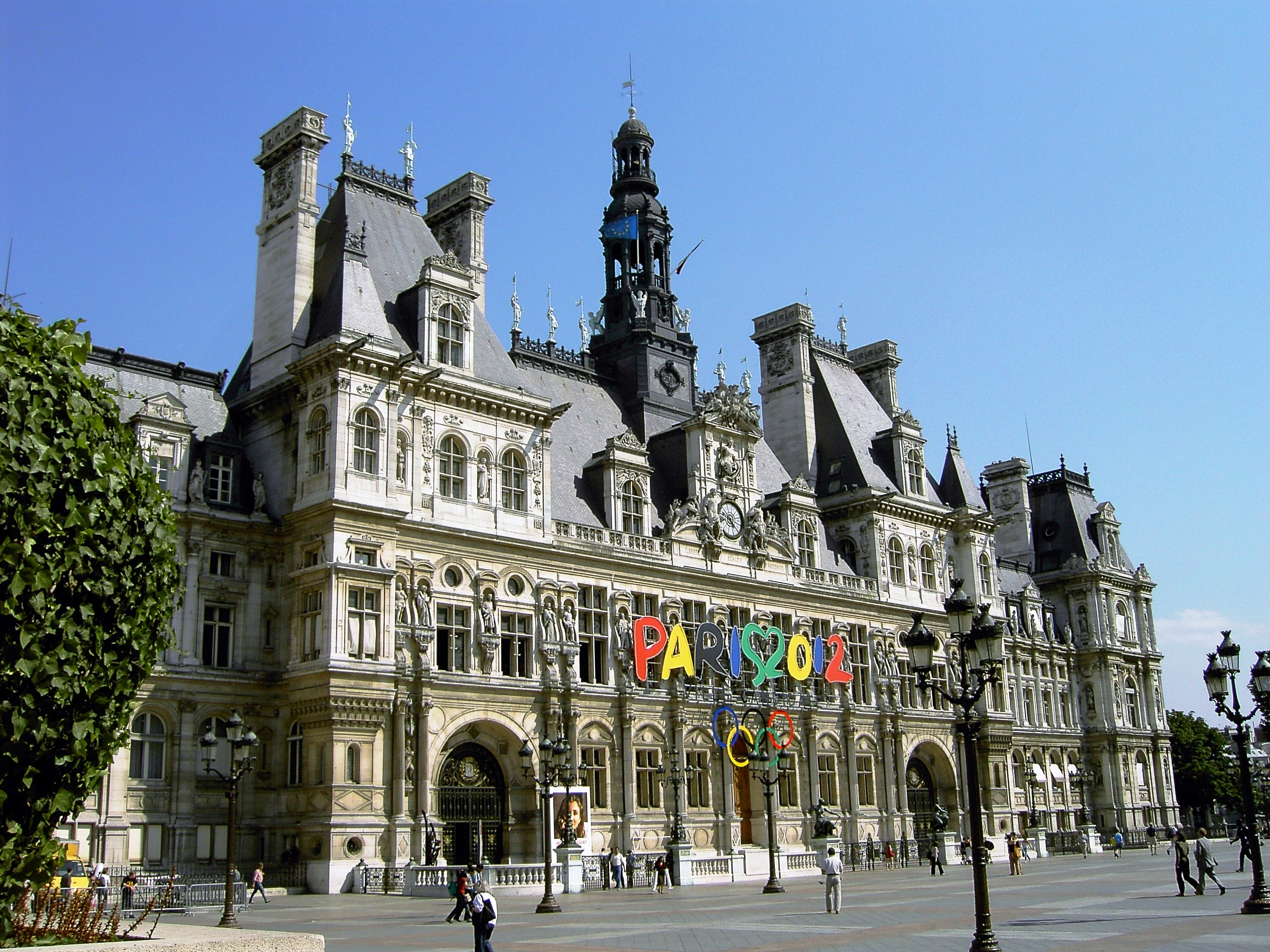

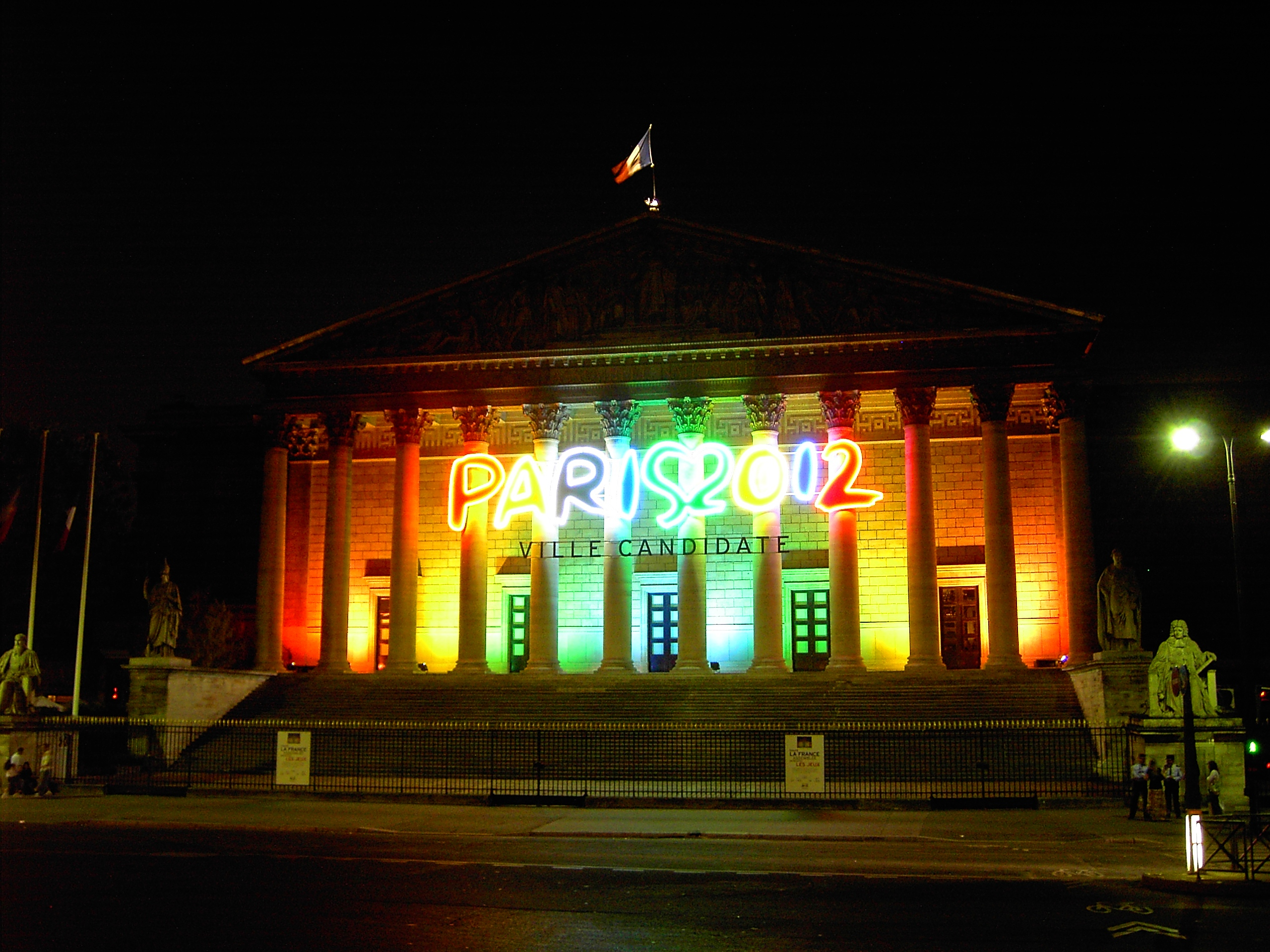

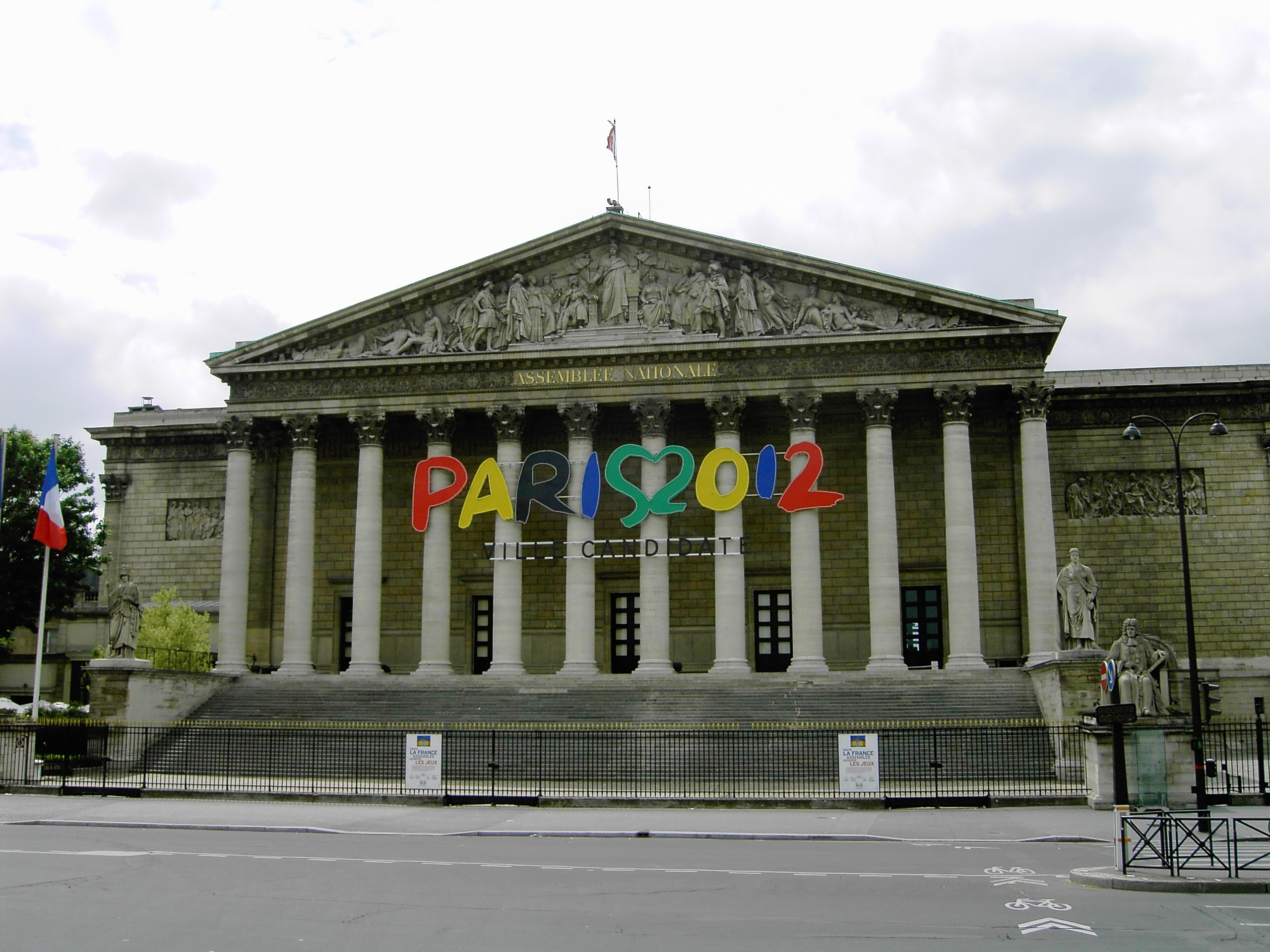
