= Moscow bid for the 2012 Summer Olympics =

Bids for the 2012 Summer Olympics and Paralympics
Overview
- Games of the XXX Olympiad; XIV Paralympic Games
- Winner: London; Runner-up: Paris; Shortlist: Madrid · Moscow · New York City

Details
- City: Moscow, Russia
- NOC: Russian Olympic Committee

Evaluation
- IOC score: 6.5

Previous Games hosted
- 1980 Summer Olympics

Decision
- Result: Fourth runner-up (15 votes)

Moscow 2012 was one of the five short-listed bids for the 2012 Summer Games, and was to be held in Moscow, Russia. The capital city's Olympic plans were to build on top of the legacy created after the 1980 Summer Olympics. Moscow's River Plan called for every single competition to be staged within city limits, which made the city's proposal one of the most compact ever. All existing venues were to have been extensively renovated and more venues were planned to be constructed in time for the Olympics. A new, modern athletes village would have been constructed on the Moscow River, which was the centerpiece and core of the city's Olympic bid. Despite the high support from the entire nation and invaluable experience, Moscow's bid suffered from a lack of accommodation and an older transport system which may not have been able to cope with the expected traffic from the Olympics.

Moscow was eliminated in the first round of the ballot to select a host city at the 117th IOC sitting on 6 July 2005, in Singapore.

Two years later, the Russian city of Sochi won the bid to host the 2014 Winter Olympics.

== Venues ==
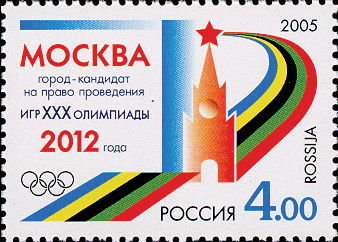
Moscow city candidate stamp for hosting the Games.

=== Olympic Park (Luzhniki) ===
- Luzhniki Stadium (Opening/Closing Ceremony, Athletics, Football-Finals match)
- Olympic Pool, Moscow (Modern Pentathlon-Swimming)
- Minor Arena (Badminton, Judo, Wrestling)
- Luzhniki Palace of Sports (Gymnastics (artistic and trampoline), Boxing)

=== Olympic Sport Center (Krylatskoye) ===
- Krylatskoye Sports Complex Velodrome (Cycling-track)
- Krylatskoye Sports Complex Canoeing and Rowing Basin (Kayaking and Rowing)
- Krylatskoye Sports Complex Palace of Sports (Table Tennis, Weightlifting)
- Krylatskoye Sports Complex Cycling Circuit (Cycling-road, Triathlon)
- New Shooting Centre in Krylatskoye Sport Complex (Shooting)

=== Tushino ===
- Tushino Arena (Rhythmic Gymnastics)
- Tushino Baseball Park (Baseball)
- Tushino Stadium (Football, Field Hockey, Softball)
- Tushino Aquatics Center (Swimming)

=== Other Arenas ===
- CSKA Sports Complex (Fencing, Taekwondo)
- CSKA Stadium (Football)
- Juan Antonio Samaranch Tennis Center (Tennis)
- Olympic Complex Sports Center (Basketball, Volleyball)
- Olympic Pool (Diving, Synchronized Swimming)
- Bitsa Olympic Equestrian Complex (Equestrian, Modern Pentathlon-Riding)
- Dynamo Stadium (Football)
- Dynamo Arena (Handball)
- Spartak Arena (Football)
- Torpedo Stadium (Football, Field Hockey)
- Locomotive FC Stadium (Football)

=== Outside of Moscow ===
- Novoperedelkino Sports Complex (BMX, Mountain Bike)
- Wiborg (Sailing)
- Borodino Field (Archery)
- Another Additional (Extra)

== International Olympic Committee evaluation report ==
The International Olympic Committee gave the Moscow bid the highest level of criticism compared to the other four candidates. The following is an excerpt from their report:

Moscow proposes a memorable experience for all athletes with minimal travel times to venues. This would occur in a country which is establishing itself as the "New Russia." Current levels of some air pollutants are a concern but are improving. The budgeting process follows IOC guidelines. While low in sports venue operations, the budget appears to be reasonable and achievable. While Moscow has good sports experience and a high number of existing competition venues, the bid committee has not presented detailed design and operational plans or a detailed construction schedule. Although planning lacked detail, the Commission believes that the Moscow 2012 village concept is feasible. A lack of detailed planning in the candidature file and background information made it difficult for the Commission to evaluate the project.
