= Bids for the 2012 Summer Olympics =

Bids for hosting the Olympics

Bids for the 2012 Summer Olympics and Paralympics
Overview
- Games of the XXX Olympiad; XIV Paralympic Games
- Winner: London; Runner-up: Paris; Shortlist: Madrid · New York City · Moscow

Details
- Committee: IOC
- Election venue: Singapore; 117th IOC Session

Map of the bidding cities

Important dates
- First Bid: 15 July 2003
- Second bid: 15 January 2004
- Shortlist: 18 May 2004
- Decision: 6 July 2005

Decision
- Winner: London (54 votes)
- Runner-up: Paris (50 votes)

Nine cities submitting bids to host the 2012 Summer Olympics and 2012 Summer Paralympics (Note: Formally known as "Games of the XXX Olympiad" and "XIV Paralympic Summer Games".) were recognised by the International Olympic Committee (IOC). The Committee shortlisted five of them—London, Madrid, Moscow, New York City, and Paris—from which London eventually prevailed; thus becoming the first city to host the Olympic Games for a third time. The bidding process for the 2012 Olympics was considered one of the most hotly contested in the history of the IOC. Paris was seen by some as the front-runner for much of the campaign, but skillful lobbying by London's supporters and an inspirational final presentation by Sebastian Coe led to the success of its bid.

After a technical evaluation of the nine original bids, the top five were shortlisted on 18 May 2004, becoming official candidates. The remaining applicant cities—Havana, Istanbul, Leipzig and Rio de Janeiro—were eliminated. Four of the five candidate cities were prominent national capitals, which lent an increased competitive interest to the final bidding phase. Paris and Madrid earned the top scores during the application phase, but in early 2005, a more thorough evaluation of the candidates put Paris and London in a close race that became tighter as the final vote approached. On 6 July 2005, in a four-round exhaustive ballot of the IOC (gathered at the 117th IOC Session in Singapore), Moscow, New York City and Madrid were eliminated in the first three rounds. London won the final round by a margin of four votes over Paris and secured the right to host the 2012 Olympics.

In the month after the election, members of the Paris 2012 delegation argued that the London delegation had violated IOC rules. The key points in the accusations were London 2012's abortive athlete incentive initiative and lobbying by then-British Prime Minister Tony Blair. A public statement by IOC President Jacques Rogge dismissed these accusations, stating that the competition had been fair. Another controversy occurred during the bidding process when an undercover investigation by British television series Panorama revealed a corruption scandal associated with IOC member Ivan Slavkov and Olympic agents, who offered to deliver votes from IOC members to any 2012 Olympic bid in return for financial favours. Still recovering from the effects of the Salt Lake City scandal, the IOC reacted swiftly and punitively toward the rule-breaking individuals.

== Bidding process ==
The Olympic bidding process begins with the submission of a city's application to the International Olympic Committee (IOC) by its National Olympic Committee (NOC) and ends with the election of the host city by the members of the IOC during an ordinary session. The process is governed by the Olympic Charter, as stated in Chapter 5, Rule 34.

Since 1999, the process has consisted of two phases. During the first phase, which begins immediately after the bid submission deadline, the "applicant cities" are required to answer a questionnaire covering themes of importance to a successful Games organisation. This information allows the IOC to analyse the cities' hosting capacities and the strengths and weaknesses of their plans. Following a detailed study of the submitted questionnaires and ensuing reports, the IOC Executive Board selects the cities that are qualified to proceed to the next phase. The second phase is the true candidature stage: the accepted applicant cities (from now on referred to as "candidate cities") are required to submit a second questionnaire in the form of an extended, more detailed, candidature file. These files are carefully studied by the IOC Evaluation Commission, a group composed of IOC members, representatives of international sport federations, NOCs, athletes, the International Paralympic Committee, and international experts in various fields. The members of the Evaluation Commission then make four-day inspection visits to each of the candidate cities, where they check the proposed venues and are briefed about details of the themes covered in the candidature file. The Evaluation Commission communicates the results of its inspections in a report sent to the IOC members up to one month before the electing IOC Session.

The IOC Session in which a host city is elected takes place in a country that did not submit an application to stage the Olympics. The election is made by the assembled active IOC members (excluding honorary and honour members), each possessing one vote. Members from countries that have a city taking part in the election cannot vote while the city is in the running. The voting is conducted in a succession of rounds until one bid achieves an absolute majority of votes; if this does not happen in the first round, the bid with the fewest votes is eliminated and another voting round begins. In the case of a tie for the lowest number of votes, a special runoff vote is carried out, with the winner proceeding to the next round. After each round, the eliminated bid is announced. Following the announcement of the host city, the successful bid delegation signs the "Host City Contract" with the IOC, which delegates the responsibilities of the Games organisation to the city and respective NOC.

=== Evaluation of applicant cities ===
The deadline to submit applications for the 2012 Summer Olympics was 15 July 2003. The nine cities that submitted bids before that date also met the 15 January 2004 deadline for submission of the first phase questionnaire. Through analysis of the questionnaires, the IOC gave a weighted-average score to each city based on the scores obtained in each of the questionnaire's eleven themes: political and social support, general infrastructure, sports venues, Olympic Village, environment, accommodation, transport, security, past experience, finance, and legacy. If a bid's score was higher than six (IOC's predefined benchmark score), the city was considered highly capable of hosting the Games; otherwise, its chances were very slim. On 18 May 2004, the IOC announced the cities accepted as candidates:

- (France) Paris — scored 8.5 (bid details)
- (Spain) Madrid — scored 8.3 (bid details)
- (United Kingdom) London — scored 7.6 (bid details)
- (United States) New York City — scored 7.5 (bid details)
- (Russia) Moscow — scored 6.5 (bid details)
- (Germany) Leipzig — scored 6.0
- (Brazil) Rio de Janeiro — scored 5.1
- (Turkey) Istanbul — scored 4.8
- (Cuba) Havana — scored 3.7

Table of scores given by the IOC Working Group to assess the quality and feasibility of the 2012 Applicant cities
Criteria	Weight	Paris		Leipzig		New York		Moscow		Istanbul		Havana		London		Madrid		Rio de Janeiro	
Criteria	Weight	FRA		GER		USA		RUS		TUR		CUB		GBR		ESP		BRA	
Criteria	Weight	Min	Max	Min	Max	Min	Max	Min	Max	Min	Max	Min	Max	Min	Max	Min	Max	Min	Max
Accommodation	5	10.0	10.0	5.2	5.5	10.0	10.0	6.2	7.4	5.9	6.5	3.3	4.1	10.0	10.0	7.9	8.4	5.0	5.6
Environmental conditions and impact	2	6.6	8.6	7.4	9.0	5.0	7.6	4.6	7.6	4.6	7.6	5.0	7.0	7.2	8.6	7.2	8.6	5.2	7.6
Experience from past sports events	2	7.6	9.0	4.8	6.8	6.2	8.0	4.6	7.0	3.4	6.0	3.0	5.6	4.8	6.8	6.0	7.4	5.0	7.6
Finance	3	6.0	8.0	6.8	8.5	5.0	7.5	4.4	7.2	4.2	6.1	3.8	5.4	6.0	8.0	6.0	8.0	3.0	6.7
General infrastructure	5	6.8	7.8	4.0	5.5	5.3	7.0	4.8	6.8	2.7	4.1	1.5	3.2	5.3	7.0	7.5	8.5	3.1	4.6
Government support, legal issues, public opinion	3	7.2	8.0	7.2	8.0	6.2	7.1	6.7	7.5	7.2	7.9	7.0	7.7	6.5	7.2	7.5	8.3	7.0	7.7
Olympic Village(s)	3	6.8	8.3	6.3	8.2	5.3	7.7	6.6	8.0	4.2	6.3	4.3	6.4	5.5	8.0	7.3	8.7	6.3	8.2
Overall project and legacy	3	8.0	9.0	4.0	7.0	5.0	8.0	5.0	7.0	3.0	5.0	2.0	5.0	6.0	8.0	8.0	9.0	4.0	6.0
Safety and security	3	7.3	8.3	6.4	7.4	6.3	7.2	5.2	6.4	3.4	4.6	3.0	4.0	6.7	7.7	6.4	7.4	3.9	4.8
Sports venues	4	6.7	8.0	5.2	7.1	6.2	7.7	5.2	7.1	4.3	6.0	3.7	5.4	5.2	7.1	7.4	8.7	4.9	7.0
Transport concept	3	6.5	8.0	5.4	7.8	4.5	6.7	4.1	6.2	3.4	5.1	2.7	4.8	4.8	6.7	7.9	9.0	3.6	5.7
TOTAL AVERAGE		8.5		6.0		7.5		6.5		4.8		3.7		7.6		8.3		5.1	

The five highest-rated applicants progressed to the next phase as official candidate cities. As stipulated, the IOC granted them the right to use the Olympic rings on their candidature emblem, together with a label identifying each as a Candidate City. (Note: The Olympic emblem (Olympic rings) is a copyrighted logo of the International Olympic Committee (IOC); the organization exclusively permits candidate cities, those high-scoring cities chosen from the applicant cities list, to use the Olympic emblem in their bid logos.)

=== Evaluation of candidate cities ===
By 15 November 2004, all candidates had submitted their candidature files to the IOC. After a period of analysis by the IOC, the cities were visited by the IOC Evaluation Commission, consisting of twelve members and chaired by Moroccan IOC member Nawal El Moutawakel. The four-day visits occurred between 3 February and 17 March 2005:

- (Spain) Madrid — 3–6 February
- (United Kingdom) London — 16–19 February
- (United States) New York City — 21–24 February
- (France) Paris — 9–12 March
- (Russia) Moscow — 14–17 March

The Parisian bid suffered two setbacks during the inspection: a number of strikes and demonstrations coincided with the visit, and a report was released stating that Guy Drut, IOC member and one of the key members of Paris's bid team, faced charges over alleged political party financial corruption.

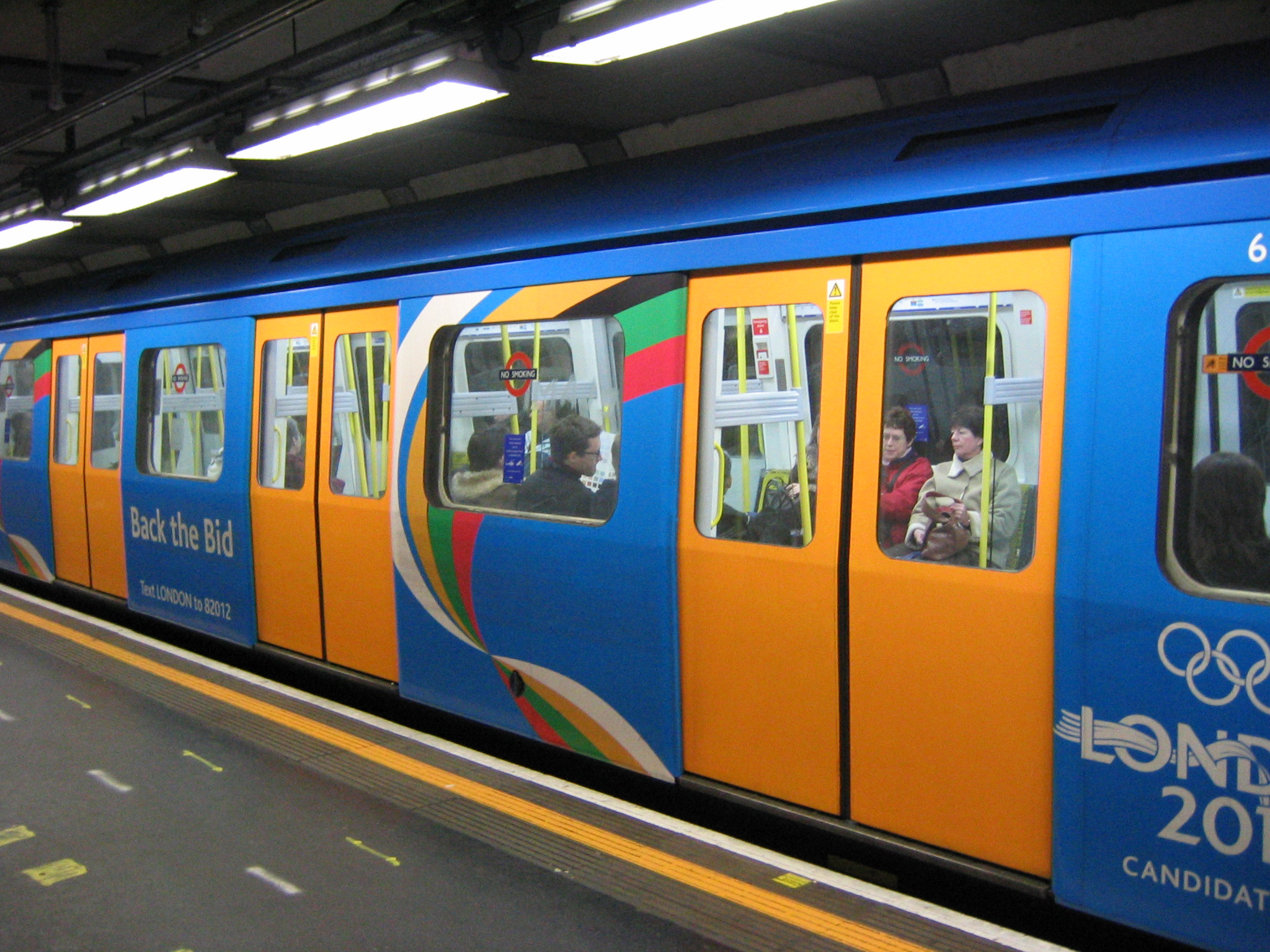
A London Underground C Stock train decorated to promote London's Olympic bid.

On 6 June 2005, the IOC released the inspection team's evaluation reports of the five candidate cities. Although these documents did not contain scores or rankings, the report for Paris was considered the most positive, followed closely by London, which had narrowed most of the gap observed at the time of the first-phase evaluation in 2004. New York City and Madrid also obtained very positive evaluations, while Moscow was considered the weakest bid. On the same day, New York City's bid suffered a major setback following the report that the State of New York refused to fund West Side Stadium, a New York 2012 centrepiece. The New York City campaign devised an alternative plan within a week, but such a major change with only one month remaining before the final vote damaged the city's chances.

Throughout the bidding process and leading up to the vote at the 117th IOC Session, Paris was widely seen as the favourite, particularly as its bid was the city's third in recent history (previous bids being for 1992 and 2008). London was originally seen as lagging behind Paris by a considerable margin, but this situation began to reverse with the appointment of Sebastian Coe as the head of London 2012, on 19 May 2004. In late August 2004, reports emerged that predicted a tie between London and Paris. In the final run-up to the 117th IOC Session, London and Paris appeared to be in an increasingly close contest. On 1 July 2005, IOC president Jacques Rogge, when asked who the winner would be, told the assembled press, "I cannot predict it since I don't know how the IOC members will vote. But my gut feeling tells me that it will be very close. Perhaps it will come down to a difference of say ten votes, or maybe less."

=== Final selection process ===
The opening ceremony of the 117th IOC Session was held at the Esplanade - Theatres on the Bay in Singapore on 5 July 2005. Prime Minister Lee Hsien Loong was the guest of honour and officially opened the session. Song, dance and martial arts exhibitions with the theme "One Voice, One Rhythm, One World" began the ceremony.

On 6 July 2005, the election day, the IOC Session was held at the Raffles City Convention Centre. It began at 1:00 UTC with the one-hour final presentations of the candidate cities, followed by a half-hour press briefing, in the following order: Paris, New York City, Moscow, London and Madrid. The bid presentations ended at 9:00 UTC and a presentation of the Evaluation Commission's final report preceded the election. Of the 116 active IOC members, 17 could not vote in the first round, leaving 99 members able to exert their voting rights.

IOC members unable to vote in the 2012 Host City Election (17)
Members from countries with candidate cities (13)	Other members (4)
(France) Jean-Claude Killy; (France) Henri Serandour; (United States) Anita DeFrantz; (United States) James L. Easton; (United States) Robert Ctvrtlik; (Russia) Vitali Smirnov; (Russia) Shamil Tarpischev; (Russia) Alexander Popov; (United Kingdom) Anne, Princess Royal; (United Kingdom) Craig Reedie; (United Kingdom) Phil Craven; (Spain) Infanta Doña Pilar de Borbón; (Spain) Juan Antonio Samaranch Jr.	(Belgium) Jacques Rogge (IOC president – allowed to vote, however elects not to vote); (Bulgaria) Ivan Slavkov (suspended); (Greece) Nikos Filaretos (absent); (France) Guy Drut (absent)

The electronic ballot began at 10:26 UTC, and the first three rounds eliminated Moscow, New York City and Madrid, respectively. After a city was eliminated, members from that city's country were allowed to vote in the following rounds. London and Paris made it to the fourth and final round of voting, which concluded at 10:45 UTC. An hour later, at 11:49 UTC, London was formally announced as the winner by Jacques Rogge. Approximately one billion viewers watched the announcement on live television.

After the announcement, the ballot results were published: London gathered more votes in the first, third and final rounds, while Madrid won the second round despite falling short on votes in the third round and being eliminated. The competitiveness of the bids from Paris and London was ultimately demonstrated by a four-vote difference in the final round.

2012 Host City Election – ballot results
City	NOC	Round 1	Round 2	Round 3	Round 4
London	Great Britain	22	27	39	54
Paris	France	21	25	33	50
Madrid	Spain	20	32	31	—
New York City	United States	19	16	—	—
Moscow	Russia	15	—	—	—

== Candidate cities overview ==
=== Candidate cities ===
City	Country	National Olympic Committee	Result
London	Great Britain	British Olympic Association (BOA)	Winner
Main article: London bid for the 2012 Summer Olympics After Birmingham and Manchester failed to deliver winning bids for the 1992, 1996 and 2000 Olympic Games, the British Olympic Association (BOA) decided that London was the best choice to pursue the goal of hosting the Summer Olympics. The centrepiece of the London bid was the Lower Lea Valley, the location designated to be transformed into a world-class Olympic Park and Olympic Village. It was to be connected via a high-speed shuttle service, dubbed the Olympic Javelin, and existing transportation links capable of transferring 240,000 people per hour. After the closing of the Games, the area was to be transformed into the largest urban park developed in Europe for more than 150 years, with an area of 500 acres (2 km^{2}), and would be home to the Olympic Medical Institute (OMI), a sports medical and rehabilitation centre. The bid called for substantial improvement of the London Underground system and more investment into new Olympic sites throughout the city. Emphasis was put on London's world-famous landmarks and existing sporting venues. London was considered to be the second favourite for the election after Paris, but an inspirational and thought-provoking presentation led by Sebastian Coe, pushed the British bid irreversibly ahead of that of the French. On 7 July 2005, the victory celebrations were marred by the terrorist attacks on London's public transport system. This prompted immediate fears concerning the security of the 2012 Games, to which the IOC and British officials reacted in a reassuring way.
Paris	France	French National Olympic and Sports Committee (CNOSF)	First runner-up
Main article: Paris bid for the 2012 Summer Olympics Paris was widely regarded as the firm favourite to become the host city of the 2012 Olympics, considering it lost out on its previous bids for the 1992 and the 2008 Summer Olympics to Barcelona and Beijing, respectively. The Parisian bid planned for the placement of sports venues in the city's northern and western clusters, with the Olympic Village stationed in between, less than 10 minutes away from each one. The plan received a high technical score from the IOC due to the city's well-maintained transport system and plentiful accommodation, making it able to handle a large number of tourists. The bid garnered much support from Parisians and the nation on the whole. Although much of the infrastructure, like the Stade de France, was already in place, the plan proposed to build temporary sports venues that could be moved and reused elsewhere after the Games. Paris's rich cultural and Olympic heritage were emphasized as well as the city's experience in hosting successful international sporting events, such as the 1998 FIFA World Cup and the 2003 World Championships in Athletics. All of these items placed Paris in a very strong position. Paris would eventually go on to win the right to host the 2024 Summer Olympics in 2017.
Madrid	Spain	Spanish Olympic Committee (COE)	Second runner-up
Main article: Madrid bid for the 2012 Summer Olympics In early 2003, Madrid beat Seville to represent the country on the international Olympic bidding stage. Madrid presented an above-average bid where almost all sports venues were located within three clusters close to each other and to the city centre. Several existing facilities ensured low expenditure would be sufficient to host the Olympics, while new and permanent sports venues would have provided a lasting Olympic legacy to the city. For the first time in the history of the Games, the transportation and accommodation of the hundreds of thousands of tourists gathering in the capital would be entirely dependent on public transport infrastructure. All venues and public transport would have run on renewable energy, turning the Games of Madrid into the "green Olympics". The city had experience in hosting numerous European and World championships and cups in several Olympic sports. Of the five candidate bids, Madrid's was the most supported by its city and national population, and its promotion was boosted with the support of the former IOC president Juan Antonio Samaranch, who lobbied votes for the Spanish capital. During the last stages of the bidding process, IOC member Prince Albert of Monaco questioned the security of Madrid, remembering the Al Qaeda terrorist attacks which took place in the city on 11 March 2004, and killed 191 people. The Spanish delegation found this remark especially offensive and regarded the final election of London over Madrid as a consequence of Albert's words.
New York City	United States	United States Olympic Committee (USOC)	Third runner-up
Main article: New York City bid for the 2012 Summer Olympics New York City was selected over San Francisco during the United States internal bid competition in 2002. The "Olympic X" plan was the main concept proposed by the bid team: two primary transportation lines would string together the several Olympic venue clusters in Manhattan, Queens, Brooklyn, and even East Rutherford, New Jersey; an 8,550-room Olympic Village would be located at the lines' intersection. Within the clusters, existing sites such as Madison Square Garden, Yankee Stadium, Central Park, USTA National Tennis Center, and Giants Stadium and Continental Airlines Arena (Meadowlands Sports Complex), would stand next to new venues, like the Queensbridge Athletic Center, Greenbelt Equestrian Center and the Flushing Meadows Regatta Center. The city assured plentiful accommodation and possessed a high-level hosting experience, and the city's ability to market itself throughout the world, was seen as one of its strongest aspects. The bid was dealt a setback when New York State authorities refused to approve the construction of the West Side Stadium, the plan's main venue, hampering the bid's chances in the short-run. The city's bid was revived when it announced an agreement to construct a new stadium (Citi Field), which was billed as the potential primary venue for the ceremonies and athletics. New York City was never seen as a front-runner, and its chances for getting the Games were hurt after Canada secured the 2010 Winter Olympics in Vancouver, British Columbia. (Note: The IOC has generally resisted awarding consecutive Olympic Games to the same continent. In recent history, however, the 2004 Summer Olympics and the 2006 Winter Olympics were both awarded to European nations, and President Jacques Rogge has said that back-to-back Olympics in the same continent were not out of the question for future games.) Years after New York City's bid loss, the Olympic Games were ultimately scheduled to return to the United States (the last Olympics in the country being the 2002 Winter Olympics in Salt Lake City, Utah), and the last Summer Olympics being the 1996 Summer Olympics, in Atlanta when Los Angeles was awarded the 2028 Summer Olympics.
Moscow	Russia	Russian Olympic Committee (OKR)	Fourth runner-up
Main article: Moscow bid for the 2012 Summer Olympics Moscow's plan for the 2012 Olympics were to be built upon the legacy created by the 1980 Summer Olympics. It called for every single competition to be staged in sports venues within the city limits and in clustered areas around the Moscow River, which would have made it one of the "most compact Games ever" according to the bid's head Valery Shantsev. All existing venues would have been extensively renovated and new venues were to be constructed and tested in time for the Olympics. The centrepiece and core of the city's Olympic bid was the new, modern Olympic Village, that would be constructed on one of the river banks. Despite a high support from the city and national population, plus an extended hosting experience, Moscow suffered from insufficient accommodation and an old transport system which may not have been able to cope with the expected traffic during the Olympics. Two years after Moscow lost the bid, the city of Sochi eventually hosted the 2014 Winter Olympics.

== Proposed dates ==
City	Games of the XXX Olympiad	XIV Paralympic Games
London	27 July - 12 August	unknown (Note: The dates that London were proposing for the XIV Paralympic Games were not made public.)
Paris	27 July - 12 August	28 August - 9 September
New York City	27 July - 12 August	31 August - 11 September
Madrid	10 - 26 August	14 - 25 September
Moscow	13 - 29 July	11 - 22 August

== Controversies ==
=== Tony Blair's Olympic pitch ===
In December 2003, the British prime minister Tony Blair spoke about the London bid during a "sports breakfast" he hosted during a summit in Nigeria. Blair mentioned the bid in context of the positive legacy of the 2002 Commonwealth Games in Manchester: "It was partly the success of the Commonwealth Games that inspired our bid for the Olympics." Since the IOC expressly forbids any international promotion of bids before the final candidature phase, it wrote to leading British officials asking for an explanation concerning the alleged violation. The chairmen of the Commonwealth Games Federation and the British Olympic Association, and spokesmen from Downing Street and London 2012 denied any violation of the IOC's ethical code, insisting that Blair's comments were taken out of context as there was no intention to promote the bid. Nevertheless, to prevent future ethical clashes, barrister Michael Beloff was appointed the ethics commissioner for the London bid two months later.

=== Ivan Slavkov corruption scandal ===
On 4 August 2004, BBC's Panorama broadcast the results of a year-long investigation in which the reporters posed as consultants from a fictitious firm "New London Ventures", which was supposed to represent businesses interested in bringing the 2012 Olympics to London. The report unveiled how some Olympic agents could guarantee votes from certain IOC members to the London bid, in exchange for favours or money. The undercover team secretly filmed its encounter with one of these agents, Goran Takac, who presented them to Ivan Slavkov, an IOC member and the Bulgarian Olympic Committee's president. Slavkov stated he was open to negotiation since he had not made up his mind about which 2012 candidate city would get his vote. Takac mentioned that Slavkov's position on the IOC was an advantage to bypass the rigid rules concerning meetings with other members, and that Slavkov's services fee was included on the initial figures given to the reporters.

In the days leading to the programme's broadcast, the IOC Ethics Commission launched an enquiry to investigate the accusations made in the documentary. Even though the Panorama reporters clearly stated that the London bid was nowhere associated with the investigation, the bid officials made further statements claiming the team had no knowledge and involvement, hoping to distance themselves from the scandal: "What I have to make clear is that London 2012 knew nothing about this—we have nothing to hide," said Alan Pascoe, a London 2012 vice chairman, committing to "do everything we can to co-operate [with the IOC enquiry] and take this story off the running order". Sebastian Coe, also a vice chairman at the time, reaffirmed Pascoe's words and assured "London 2012 has acted properly and ethically throughout the bidding process." After watching the documentary, IOC members and officials cleared London 2012 of any wrongdoing.

Following the broadcast, the IOC provisionally suspended Ivan Slavkov and forbade him from attending the 2004 Summer Olympics. Jacques Rogge claimed he was "an angry man because some people are not playing by the rules," underlining that "Under my leadership, I can stress there is zero tolerance for unethical behaviour". An IOC Ethics Commission report released on 25 October 2004 condemned Slavkov and backed the veracity of the BBC's investigation: "the complete recording of the meeting between Mr Slavkov and the two journalists reveals that: ...at no time and in no way did Mr Slavkov object to this discussion of the terms of a contract to secure a candidate city the votes of IOC members whom he and Mr Takac were likely to be able to influence". Knowing about the accusation, Slavkov argued that he attended the meeting with the purpose of trying to frame the supposed corrupters, however the Ethics Commission report further stated that "at no point does it emerge from the meeting that Mr Slavkov's sole intention was to catch in the act these corrupters of IOC members." It goes on to say that Slavkov received "no mandate to 'find the real roots of corruption'" and that he was to profit monetarily from Takac's services. The report concluded:

"Mr Slavkov tarnished the honour and reputation of the Olympic Movement and the IOC... Indeed, an IOC member's involvement in this 'negotiation' lent credibility to the hypothesis advanced by the journalists that there were within the IOC members and agents who could corrupt other IOC members."

On 7 July 2005, during the 117th IOC Session, Ivan Slavkov was expelled from the organisation following an 84–12 voting by the IOC members.

=== French recriminations following vote ===
The Paris delegation, led by Bertrand Delanoë, argued that Tony Blair and the London delegation had broken the IOC rules. On 11 July 2005, Delanoë stated: "They have not respected the rules established by the International Olympic Committee. I do not say that they were flirting with the yellow line, I say that they crossed the yellow line". A controversial move by the London bid team was its initiative to offer incentive packages for participating athletes, which included free flights, food, vouchers for long-distance calling and other financial accommodations. Immediately after announcing the initiative, London withdrew it, most likely as a result of Jacques Rogge raising concerns over its potential to start a "bidding war". Paris also claimed that the lobbying by Tony Blair was illegal, an accusation that was strongly denied by Downing Street. It was not until 4 August 2005 that Jacques Rogge suppressed any further controversies by saying in a statement: "I made it very clear that, in my opinion, the competition was fair. It was conducted according to the rules that we have set out". Delanoë's comments were criticised by Parisian political leaders; Claude Goasguen, president of the Union for a Popular Movement (UMP) party of the Council of Paris, stated: "One cannot make such type of accusations without delivering any proof".

Even before the election, tensions grew between the French and British delegations, already in Singapore. The Paris bid team considered submitting a complaint against London bid consultants Jim Sloman and Rod Sheard after they stated that the Stade de France was not adequate for athletics, an action that goes against the IOC rules which forbid any bid to make statements about a rival bid. The London team promptly denied that the two men were under contract with the bid at that time, and underlined that their opinions did not reflect the views of the London bid.

=== Mistaken voting controversy ===
On 23 December 2005, Alex Gilady, an Israeli IOC member and a member of the IOC's London 2012 Co-ordination Commission, suggested that Madrid should have tied for second spot with Paris in the third round of voting, but did not do so because Greek member Lambis Nikolaou pressed the wrong button. He further postulated that if this had happened, Madrid would have beaten Paris in the resulting runoff ballot for second place, and gone on to beat London in the final round. However, Craig Reedie, a British IOC member, dismissed these words, commenting that a claim "that an unnamed member 'might' have done something which 'might' have brought about something else which 'might' have brought about a different result is 'the kind of tittle-tattle that happens after many an IOC vote'."

By the end of 2005, Lambis Nikolaou denied Gilady's claims: "All this speculation surrounding my role in the third round of voting for the 2012 candidates is totally unfounded. I state that I did not vote in the third round as I had announced at the time of the vote." This statement was confirmed by the IOC voting numbers, which demonstrate that, even if Nikolaou had voted for Madrid, the city would have failed to beat Paris in the third voting round.

=== Chirac's culinary comments ===
Then-French President Jacques Chirac became the subject of controversy the day before the International Olympic Committee was due to pick a host city. Chirac made comments stating that "the only worse food than British food is Finnish" and "the only thing the British have done for Europe's agriculture is mad cow disease". Not only were Chirac's comments considered unsportsmanlike where the normal etiquette is not to criticize rival cities, there were two IOC members from Finland who would vote in the final ballot. While Paris was widely acknowledged as the front runner, the narrow loss to London led many to believe that Chirac's comments were at fault.

== Potential applicant cities ==
Besides the initial nine applicant cities, other cities also wished to bid for the 2012 Summer Olympics, but the bids were not internally selected by the NOC (in case of more than one bidding city from the same country), were not put forward to the IOC, or were withdrawn before filing the necessary paperwork.

The Nigerian capital, Abuja, planned to present a bid to become the first African city to stage the Olympic Games, but ended up not filling its application. In Asia, four cities were interested in holding the Games, but did not officially submit a bid: Hyderabad, New Delhi, Osaka and Tel Aviv. In South America, the Brazilian Olympic Committee chose Rio de Janeiro over São Paulo, and if Rio de Janeiro had been selected by the IOC, it would have been the first Olympiad staged in South America (four years on, Rio de Janeiro did land the 2016 Summer Olympics). In Canada, Toronto initially planned to gain hosting rights for 2012 after losing the 2008 Olympics bidding process, but because Vancouver landed the 2010 Winter Olympics, the Canadian city cancelled these plans. In the United States, the city of New York was picked by the United States Olympic Committee (USOC) over San Francisco, although several other cities submitted candidatures to become the American candidate for the 2012 Olympics; these included Houston, Washington D.C. (in cooperation with nearby Baltimore), Cincinnati, Dallas, Pittsburgh, Los Angeles, Seattle and Tampa (in cooperation with nearby Orlando). Several European cities wanted to follow the likes of London, Madrid, Moscow and Paris, and were thus hopeful to gain their NOC's support. Germany chose Leipzig over Düsseldorf, Frankfurt, Hamburg, and Stuttgart, while in Spain, Seville lost out to Madrid. Other referenced cities were Budapest, Milan, Rome, Stockholm, Gothenburg, Malmö, Oslo and Copenhagen.
