= London bid for the 2012 Summer Olympics =

Successful bid to host the Olympic Games

Coordinates: 51.54615°N 0.01269°W

Bids for the 2012 Summer Olympics and Paralympics
Overview
- Games of the XXX Olympiad; XIV Paralympic Games
- Winner: London; Runner-up: Paris; Shortlist: Madrid · Moscow · New York City

Details
- City: London, United Kingdom
- NOC: British Olympic Association (BOA)

Evaluation
- IOC score: 7.6

Previous Games hosted
- 1908 Summer Olympics; 1948 Summer Olympics

Decision
- Result: Defeated Paris in Round 4, 54–50

London 2012 was the successful bid to host the 2012 Summer Olympics, held in London with most events taking place in Stratford in the borough of Newham. The British Olympic Association had been working on the bid since 1997, and presented its report to government ministers in December 2000.

Following three consecutive unsuccessful UK bids to host summer Olympic Games (Birmingham for 1992 and Manchester for 1996 and 2000), the decision was made to bid with London, given the clear indication that it was the only UK city that had a chance of being selected by the International Olympic Committee (IOC) when put up against other world cities in a competitive bidding process. On 6 July 2005 at its 117th Session in Singapore, the IOC awarded London the right to host the Games of the XXX Olympiad. The city beat the favourite Paris 54 to 50 on the fourth and final ballot. London was the first city to host the Games three times.

At the time of the bid, the budget projection was around £2 billion, but it was later estimated that the true cost would be around £9 billion. It ended up costing £8.8 billion. The project involved a major regeneration of the Stratford area of London, as well as improvements to surrounding services and associated venues. Public transport, an aspect of the proposal which scored poorly for the bid, saw numerous improvements, including to the London Underground and the new "Olympic Javelin" service.

The celebrations of the bid's success were partly silenced the day after the announcement when the 7 July 2005 London bombings killed 52 people and injured hundreds more. There was no confirmed link between the IOC decision and the attack, which also coincided with the G8 Summit in Scotland.

Following the success of the bid, the London Organising Committee for the Olympic Games and Paralympic Games (LOCOG) was established to oversee the ongoing development of the games. Some alterations were made after the bid was accepted, including the decision by the IOC to eliminate some sporting events, and a new layout for the Olympic Zone, both resulting in some relatively minor changes to the Olympic venues.

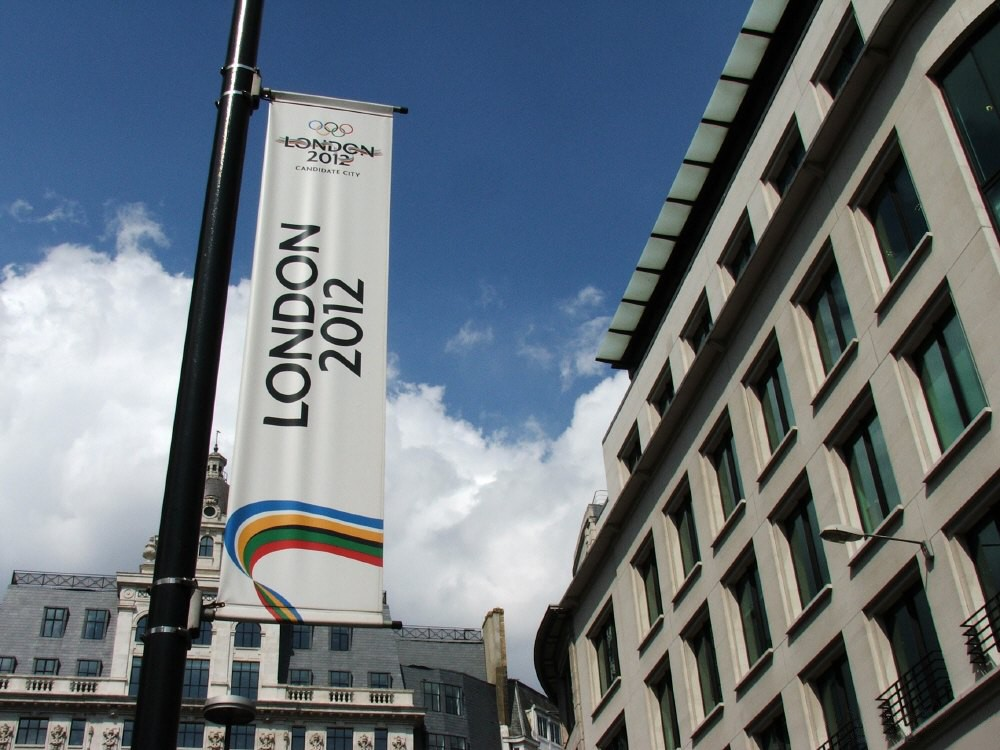
London 2012 banner at The Monument

== Sporting venues ==
The 2012 Olympics were planned to use a mixture of newly built venues, existing facilities, and temporary facilities, some of them in well known locations such as Hyde Park and Horse Guards Parade. In the wake of the problems that plagued the Millennium Dome, the intention was that there would be no white elephants after the games. Some of the new facilities would be reused in their Olympic form, while others would be reduced in size and several would be relocated elsewhere in the UK. The plans would contribute to the regeneration of Stratford in east London, which would be the site of the Olympic Park, and of the neighbouring Lower Lea Valley.

However, this required the compulsory purchase of some businesses and this caused controversy, with some of the business owners claiming that the compensation offered was inadequate. The purchased buildings were demolished to make way for Olympic venues and infrastructure improvements.

The majority of venues were divided into three zones within Greater London: the Olympic Zone, the River Zone and the Central Zone. Also some venues (such as those for sailing) were outside the boundaries of Greater London.

The IOC noted that future negotiations were necessary to ensure the use of the Old Trafford and Villa Park football stadiums. The need for compulsory purchase orders was also highlighted as a possible problem for the Olympic Park, but IOC did not expect this to cause any "undue delay to construction schedules".

At the time of the bid, 60% of the venues and facilities were in place. The remaining venues were proposed to be completed between 2007 and the start of the games. At time of the bid the following were the tentative completion dates for some of the remaining venues: Channel Tunnel/Stratford rail link (2007); Aquatics Centre and London Velopark (2008); East London line extension (2010); Olympic Stadium and Heathrow Terminal 5 final completion (2011).

=== Olympic Zone ===
The Olympic Zone encompasses all of the facilities within the 500-acre (2 km^{2}) Olympic Park in Stratford. This park was developed on existing waste and industrial land, at grid reference TQ379849, just seven minutes by Olympic Javelin train from central London. The park contains:

- The Olympic Stadium, hosting the track and field athletics events as well as the opening and closing ceremonies.
- The Aquatics Centre, hosting diving, swimming and synchronised swimming.
- The Water Polo Arena, hosting water polo – the first Olympic venue dedicated to hosting the sport.
- The London Velopark, including a 6,000-seat indoor velodrome for track cycling and a 6,000-seat outdoor BMX racing track.
- The Riverbank Arena, with 15,000 and 5,000-seat arenas, hosting hockey.
- Four indoor arenas (Olympic Park Arenas 1–4), hosting basketball (2), fencing (4), volleyball (1), handball (3), and the fencing and shooting disciplines of the modern pentathlon (2).
- The London Olympic Village, with accommodation for all athletes and accredited officials (some 17,320 beds in total). After the games, the village was planned to become a district of the Stratford City development, a multi-billion-pound development project on the former railway goods yard to the east of the Olympic Park.
- The Olympic Press and Broadcast Centres.
- A tennis training centre.

=== River Zone ===
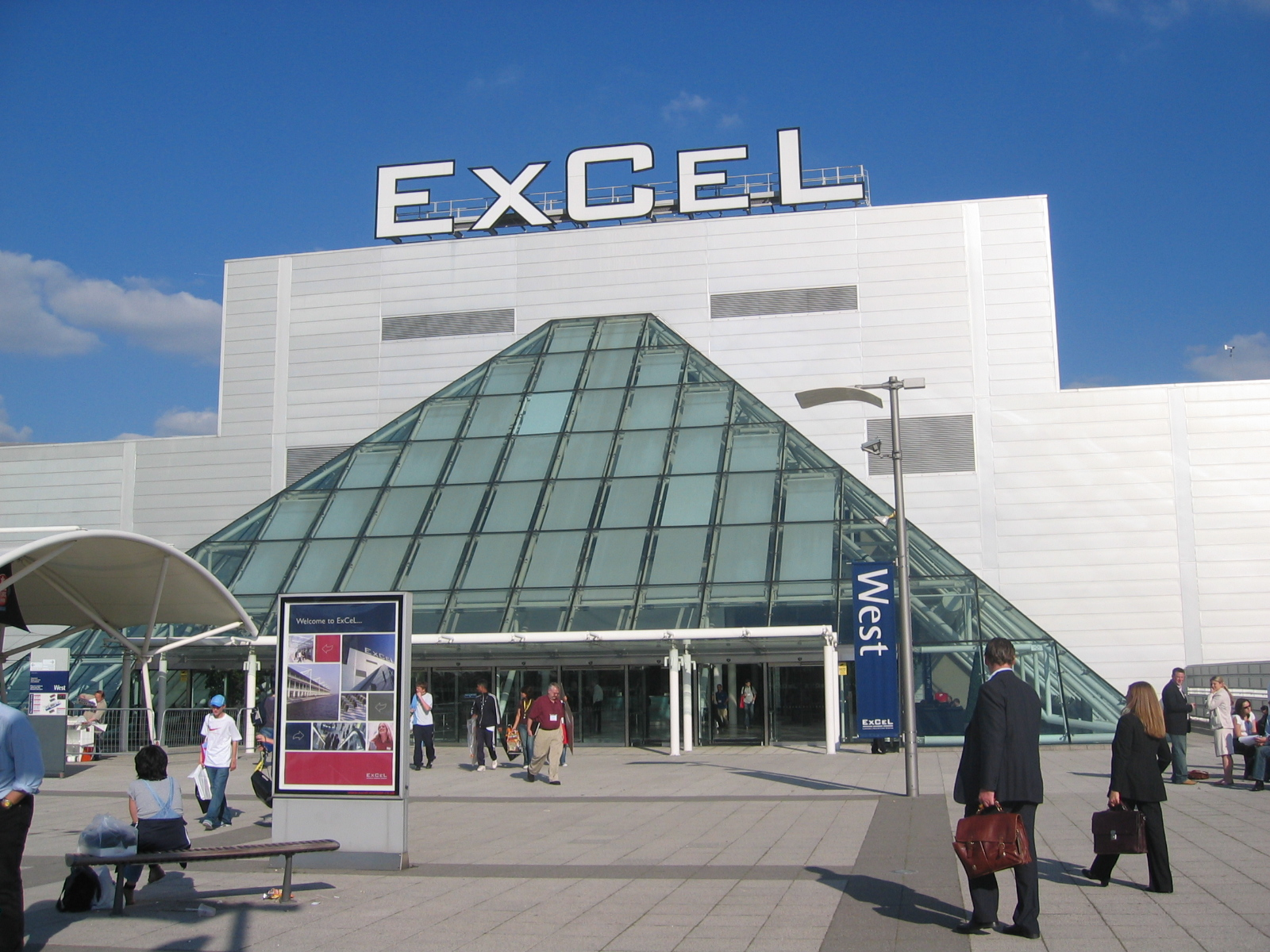
ExCel Exhibition Centre

The River Zone featured five main venues in the Thames Gateway area straddling the River Thames:

- The ExCeL Exhibition Centre, for boxing, fencing, judo, table tennis, taekwondo, weightlifting, and wrestling.
- The Millennium Dome and Greenwich Arena, for badminton, basketball, and gymnastics.
- Greenwich Park, for equestrianism.
- The Royal Artillery Barracks, for shooting.

=== Central Zone ===
The Central Zone was formed out of all the remaining venues within Greater London. They are quite widely spread across central and west London:

- The new Wembley Stadium for the football finals.
- The All England Lawn Tennis and Croquet Club at Wimbledon for tennis.
- Lord's Cricket Ground for archery.
- Regent's Park for road bicycle racing. Baseball and softball were also due to be hosted in Regent's Park before it was announced in July 2005 that they would be dropped as Olympic events for the London games.
- Horse Guards Parade for beach volleyball.
- Hyde Park for the triathlon.

=== Outside Greater London ===
Three of the venues were just outside Greater London:

- Weald Country Park, Essex for mountain biking
- Broxbourne, Hertfordshire for canoe/kayak slalom
- Dorney Lake, in Buckinghamshire, for rowing and canoe/kayak flatwater.

The Weymouth and Portland National Sailing Academy, in Portland Harbour, Dorset, on the south coast of England, would be used for the sailing events. It is around 120 miles (192 km) from central London.

The earlier stages of the football competition were played at football stadia around the country including:

- Hampden Park in Glasgow
- Millennium Stadium in Cardiff
- Old Trafford in Manchester
- St James' Park in Newcastle
- Ricoh Arena in Coventry
- Windsor Park in Belfast

=== Olympic Village ===
The Olympic Village was located in Lower Lea Valley in east London. The area was then underdeveloped, and thus a well-suited place to construct the village. Because the Olympic Village is located within the Olympic Park, about 75 percent of athletes would be within 15 minutes of their venues; this compact design, according to double Olympic decathlon gold medallist Daley Thompson, would "make [the experience] so much more inspirating [sic] and real". When the games are over, the Village will be converted into new homes and facilities for the local community.

Australian construction company Lend Lease Corp Ltd was chosen to build the Olympic Village. The project cost £5.3 billion (A$13.2 billion) and was constructed in two phases. The first phase, which involves the development of 4,200 residential buildings and other accommodations for the village, began in 2008. When the 2012 Olympics are over, the second phase will involve the refurbishment of the Olympic village and construction on another 500,000 m^{2} (5,400,000 sq ft) of space to complete the regeneration of Stratford City.

The Olympic Village's accommodations are the most spacious in Olympic history. Each athlete and official is guaranteed their own bed – over 17,000 beds in total. Each apartment was billed to include Internet access and wireless networking and other state-of-the-art technology.

=== Transport and infrastructure ===
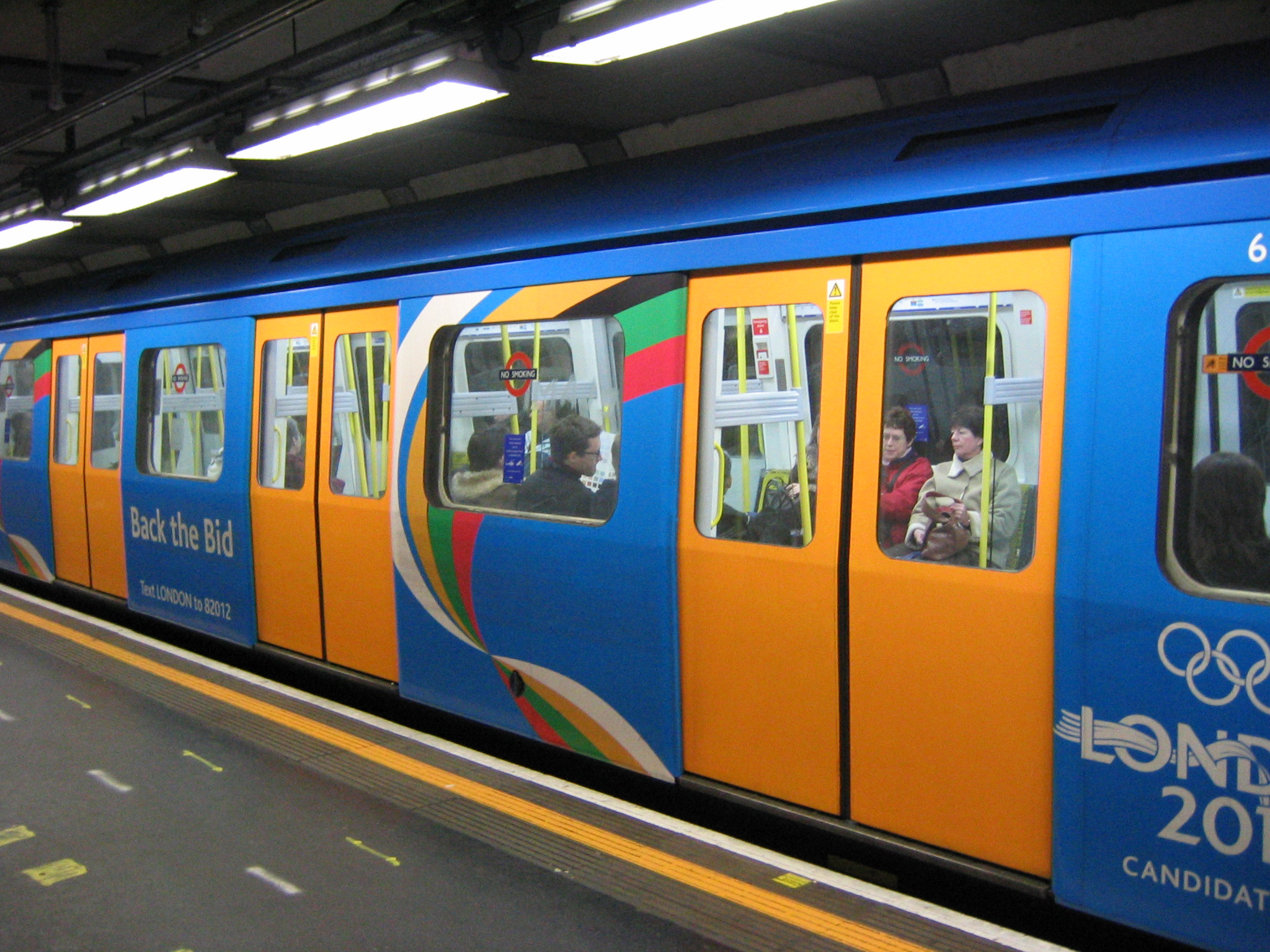
A London Underground train decorated to promote London's olympic bid – this coincided with plans for investment the city's public transport network

Public transport, an aspect of the bid which scored poorly in the IOC's initial evaluation, was planned to see numerous improvements, including the expansion of the London Underground's East London Line, upgrades to the Docklands Light Railway and the North London Line, and the temporary "Olympic Javelin" service. The games were won without a commitment to deliver Crossrail by 2012. This was the largest transport project proposed for London, and it was widely assumed in the early stages of the bidding process that the games could not be won without a guarantee that it would be completed before the games.

The bid envisaged that 80% of athletes would be within 20 minutes of their events and 97% would be within 30 minutes of their events. It was estimated that 80% of spectators would arrive by rail. Together, all the planned heavy rail, light rail, and underground services (excluding Crossrail) were expected to deliver around 240 trains every hour.

Additionally, there were to be two major park and ride sites off the M25 within 25 minutes of the Olympic Park capable of holding 12,000 cars. For the most part, predictions showed that on event days, 78% of spectators were likely to travel from within London and only 22% from the rest of the UK and Europe. Organisers hoped to use low- or no-emission vehicles to transport Olympic athletes and officials.

=== Budget ===
As of the time of the bid, projections for the cost of the 2012 Olympics were low. The bid team believed that London could end the Games with a surplus of more than £100 million. The organising committee laid out the following figures:

- £560 million for new venues, including £250 million for the Olympic Stadium.
- £650 million for the Olympic village.
- £1.5 billion to run the Games.
- £200 million on security.

The revenue for the games was also projected:

- £1.5 billion from a special Olympic National Lottery game.
- £625 million from a council tax surcharge of £20 per year for London households.
- £560 million from IOC television and marketing deals.
- £450 million from sponsorship and official suppliers.
- £300 million from ticket sales.
- £250 million from the London Development Agency.
- £60 million from licensing.

While this projection seemed reasonable, many were adamant about the actual costs. In early 2007, it was suggested that the actual cost of the games could exceed £9.35 billion (US$18.03 billion), well over the bid projection. For comparison, the 2004 games in Athens cost around £7 billion (US$13.5 billion) and estimates for the 2008 games in Beijing run between £10 billion and £20 billion (US$19 billion and US$39 billion).

=== Ticketing ===
Approximately 8.0 million tickets were proposed to be available for the Olympics, and 1.5 million tickets for the Paralympics. and the London Organising Committee planned on selling a total of 6.5 million (an 81% sellout) Olympic tickets, and a 63% sellout for Paralympic tickets. Olympic tickets went on sale on 15 March 2011 and remained on sale until the start of the event, depending on availability. With the purchase of a ticket, each person was entitled to free transportation on London's public transport system for that day. Paralympic tickets went on sale on 9 September 2011.

Marketing Director David Magliano said that 1.5 million tickets would be sold for £15 (US$29). The average ticket price was set to be £40 (US$77) and 75% of all tickets would cost less than £50 (US$97), prices that Magliano says are reasonably accessible to almost everyone in Britain. In addition to stadium seats, there would be 20,000 £10 (US$19) tickets for the Olympic Park to watch events on big screens.

=== Political commitment ===
To facilitate the Olympics at a governmental level, Cabinet-level Minister for the Olympics Tessa Jowell was set to be responsible for the games. Also in the Cabinet would be an Olympic Security Committee to co-ordinate security planning. In addition, the government proposed to create the Olympic Delivery Authority, which would oversee the construction of venues and see that the games are lived out past 2012.

=== Other details ===
- A tri-generation plant to supply electricity, heat and chilled water to the Olympic Park using technology which produces 33% lower CO_{2} emissions than from the electricity grid.
- By 2012, it was estimated that over 135,000 hotel rooms would be available within 50 kilometres of the Olympic Park, up from 103,000 at the time of the bid. 40,330 rooms had been guaranteed at the time of the bid.
- For the first time in any Games, live Olympic backdrop presentation facilities would be available to broadcast rights holders via rooftop studios on the main press centre with a direct view of the Olympic Stadium and Park.
- The torch relay would highlight the "Olympic Truce" by passing through the countries of Nobel Peace Prize winners. Following criticism of the International Torch relay in advance of the 2008 Beijing Summer Games, this was re-designed to be a UK-wide 70-day, 8000-mile torch relay with a brief excursion to Dublin, Ireland.
- The first chairman of the London Olympic Bid was airline executive Barbara Cassani. Charles Allen, Lord Coe and Alan Pascoe were appointed Vice Chairmen in September 2003. Cassani guided the group through the first submission to the IOC, but stepped down in May 2004 in favour of Lord Coe. Coe, himself an Olympic gold medal-winning athlete and former Conservative politician, enlisted the support of many current and former British Olympians, including Kelly Holmes, Steve Redgrave, and Daley Thompson.

== Planned legacy of the Games ==
The organising committee paid special attention to the after effects of the games on London, and what they could do to make sure the games left a lasting impression on London and the world. The London Organising Committee of the Olympic and Paralympic Games planned out the uses of important stadiums and transportation systems after the games, as well as the social factors of the 2012 legacy.

One of the most prominent of the proposed legacy is the conversion of the Olympic Village into 3,600 apartments, most of which will be affordable housing. Most of Stratford City will be regenerated with the construction of 500,000 more square metres of space.

The committee outlined plans to donate the sports equipment used in the Games to sports clubs and charities in the United Kingdom.

=== Sports venues ===
One of the priorities governing the contents of London's bid was to avoid leaving "white elephants" after the games. To be sure that important venues and stadiums do not go to waste, the organising committee has planned what to do with them after the games. All venues that will not have a planned use after the games are over will be built as temporary venues.

The 80,000-seat Olympic Stadium will be converted into a 25,000-seat multi-purpose venue to be mainly used for athletics events. The Stadium should become the hub of east London activities when the games end.

The Aquatics Centre after the games will include two 50-metre pools, a 25-metre diving pool and a fitness centre. They will be able to accommodate elite, development, local club and community users. The venue will allow for 3,500 spectators and would host local, national, and worldwide swimming events.

To connect a variety of cycling and walking trails throughout the Lea Valley, the London Velopark will be transformed into a multi-discipline cycling centre. It will be extended further northwards, with the legacy road cycling circuit straddling the A12 and extending into the old Eton Manor site, where the mountain biking area will be located. The transformed stadium will consist of a 3,000-seat velodrome, road track, competition and play BMX tracks, and a mountain biking course for use by all levels of cyclists.

The Olympic Hockey Centre after the games will become a venue providing training and competition facilities for hockey at all levels. It will feature a 5,000 seat arena and a training pitch.

In addition, several of the indoor arenas would be assembled elsewhere in the UK. The construction of the Aquatics Centre and the Velopark was confirmed before London won the Games, so it might be more accurate to call them legacies of the bid rather than of the Games. While the legacy venues would be tailored to London's ongoing needs, some of them would be expensive for that purpose. For example, London will have paid for an 80,000-seat athletics stadium, but will only possess a 25,000-seat stadium.

=== Social and economic benefits ===
At the time of the bid, those involved in British sport were hopeful that there would also be a 2012 legacy of increased commitment to sport in the UK, with the social and health benefits they believe that could bring, but it will be difficult to assess whether or not this really happens. Some commentators have argued that it would be better to invest directly in grass roots sport.

Disability organisations including the Autism Awareness Campaign UK were confident that the Olympic and Paralympic Games would encourage people across the disability spectrum to take up sport.

Other legacy items would include the conversion of the Olympic Village Polyclinic into a lifelong learning centre for the east London community with a nursery and primary and secondary schools, and the conversion of the media and press centre into a creative industries centre for east London. The organisers claimed that 3,000 new permanent jobs would be created, but opponents of the games were concerned that some of the 11,000 existing jobs in the Olympic Zone may be lost. It was also hoped that there will be a wider economic effect from the improvements which the games might make to London's image.

=== Transport ===
The planned transport legacy for the capital included new bus transit schemes, extensions to existing Underground lines, redevelopments of London Underground stations and upgrades to the trains used. There were also to be many upgrades to National Rail services with the Channel Tunnel Rail Link, a new high-speed rail link, several new stations and upgrades to stations such as King's Cross St Pancras. Please view the Legacy Map to see the upgrades to the London Transport network in context.

== Opinions of the bid ==
=== Support ===
The Head of the IOC evaluation commission praised the passion behind the London 2012 bid when they visited Stratford and other places in the city. The IOC evaluation commission chair Nawal El Moutawakel speaking at a press conference in London observed: "We could feel it, hear it and see it." She added, "It was in every speech and every word."

2012 was seen as a window of opportunity as observers saw Europe as the destination for the Games. Four of the five finalist cities were from Europe.

Support for the bid topped 70% of the people of the United Kingdom and 68% of the people in London, as shown by an opinion poll commissioned by the IOC. Some of the support can be attributed to the city's "Back the Bid" campaign, which included the slogan on posters that were hung around London in the months leading up to the decision to award the 2012 Games to London. Many disability organisations including the Autism Awareness Campaign UK urged all people with disabilities to back the London 2012 bid.

On 17 June 2005, British Prime Minister Tony Blair reiterated the Government's total commitment to London's bid for the 2012 Olympic Games and Paralympic Games. Mr Blair told BBC Five Live that he would be travelling to Singapore with the London delegation to stress the "complete 100% support" of politicians from all the major political parties in the country. "The most important thing is to show people that the Government is absolutely behind the bid", said Mr Blair, who travelled to the Far East before returning to chair the 31st G8 summit at Gleneagles Hotel in Perthshire, Scotland. The leaders of the opposition parties also attended the meeting and expressed their support of the venture.

=== Criticism ===
Many Londoners challenged the high cost of the Olympics and the £20 per year council tax rise to fund it as well as the possibility of white elephant sites like the Millennium Dome being left. Additionally there were concerns that unions, including the RMT, would strike near or during the proceedings for bonuses and that construction deadlines would not be met.

Outside of London the success was not universally welcomed, with fears that the event would divert funding from the rest of the country and that the rest of the United Kingdom would be forced to help fund it, for no benefit. Local business – some extant in this area for over 100 years – were questioning the package of measures in place to allow them to find new sites when the new Olympic village displaced them.

Comparison had been drawn between the Manchester bid and this one, in terms of the amount of government support, and the overwhelmingly hostile attitude of the London-based press to Manchester's bid. Furthermore the cost of travelling and accommodation would rise across London which many thought would outprice tourists and leave many events under-attended.

== IOC evaluation report ==
The International Olympic Committee's evaluation report was generally very positive. It scored poorly on the transportation and public/government support aspects of the evaluation, but received a 10 in accommodations.

London has proposed Games based on providing world-class facilities and services for the athletes, and a legacy for sport and the community. Whilst the Olympic Park would undoubtedly leave a strong sporting and environmental legacy for London, the magnitude of the project, including the planned upgrade and expansion of transport infrastructure, would require careful planning to ensure all facilities and rehabilitation projects were completed on time. Air quality in London at proposed Games-time is generally satisfactory. Increasing levels of ozone pollution are however a concern, but legislation and actions now in place are aimed at correcting that trend. With its rich history, the capacities of UK Paralympic Sport are among the best in the world. Athletes have been closely involved in the planning of the Olympic Village. The east side of the village would appear to be somewhat crowded.

== See also ==
- London 2012
