= Bids for the 2024 and 2028 Summer Olympics =

Selection process for upcoming Summer Olympics

Bids for the 2028 Summer Olympics and Paralympics
Overview
- Games of the XXXIV Olympiad; XVIII Paralympic Games
- Winner: Los Angeles

Details
- Committee: IOC
- Election venue: 131st IOC Session; Lima, Peru

Map of the bidding cities

Important dates
- Bid: 15 September 2015
- Decision: 13 September 2017

Decision
- Winner: Los Angeles
- Runner-up

Bids for the 2024 Summer Olympics and Paralympics
Overview
- Games of the XXXIII Olympiad; XVII Paralympic Games
- Winner: Paris

Details
- Committee: IOC
- Election venue: 131st IOC Session; Lima, Peru

Map of the bidding cities

Important dates
- Bid: 15 September 2015
- Decision: 13 September 2017

Decision
- Winner: Paris
- Runner-up

Five bids were initially submitted for the 2024 Summer Olympics. Following withdrawals, two bidding cities—Paris and Los Angeles—were left in the process. In July 2017, the IOC agreed to award the 2024 and 2028 Games simultaneously. Los Angeles agreed to bid for the 2028 Games, effectively ceding the 2024 Games to Paris.

Paris and Los Angeles were officially awarded the Games at the 131st IOC Session in Lima, Peru, on 13 September 2017.

== Bidding process ==
=== 2024 Games ===
The candidature process for the 2024 Games was announced at the same time as the names of the five candidate cities on 16 September 2015. The procedure consisted of three stages: Stage 1 – Vision, games concept and strategy; Stage 2 – Governance, legal and venue funding; and Stage 3 – Games delivery, experience and venue legacy.

	Stage	Dates	Candidature File Submission
1	Vision, Games Concept and Strategy	15 September 2015 – 1 June 2016	Candidature File Part 1; 17 February 2016
2	Governance, Legal and Venue Funding	June – December 2016	Candidature File Part 2; 7 October 2016
3	Games Delivery, Experience and Venue Legacy	December 2016 – September 2017; Election by IOC Session	Candidature File Part 3; 3 February 2017

Five candidate cities were announced by the International Olympic Committee on 16 September 2015: Budapest, Hamburg, Los Angeles, Paris and Rome. However, the process was hit by withdrawals, with political uncertainty and cost cited as deterrents to bidding cities. Hamburg withdrew its bid on 29 November 2015 after holding a referendum. Rome withdrew on 21 September 2016, citing fiscal difficulties. On 22 February 2017, Budapest withdrew after a petition against the bid collected more signatures than necessary for a referendum.

=== Combined 2024 and 2028 ===
On 30 March 2017, the IOC evaluation team concluded an initial two-day review of the rival proposals from Los Angeles and Paris. The IOC's evaluation commission praised both candidates for “creativity and strong legacy focus.”

With a view to securing the future of the Games in the context of withdrawals by two of the four cities that had bid for the 2022 Winter Olympics, and three of the five cities that had bid for the 2024 Games, on 3 April 2017 at the IOC convention in Denmark, Olympic officials met with bid committees from both cities to discuss the possibility of awarding Games to both, with one city hosting in 2024 and the other in 2028. While both cities appeared initially opposed to this compromise, Los Angeles had indicated that it would be willing to consider it if certain concessions were made after it was revealed that Paris was the "Favourite" for 2024.

The IOC Executive Board met in Lausanne, Switzerland to discuss the 2024 and 2028 bid processes on 9 June 2017. The International Olympic Committee formally proposed electing the 2024 and 2028 Olympic host cities at the same time at the next IOC meeting. The proposal was approved by an Extraordinary IOC Session on 11 July 2017 in Lausanne and presented to the IOC as a whole. The IOC set up a process where the LA 2024 bid committee, the Paris 2024 bid committee and the IOC would meet and discuss who would take which games and if it were possible. On 31 July 2017, Los Angeles announced it would withdraw from the 2024 bid race and bid exclusively for the 2028 games. Both Paris and Los Angeles bid committees displayed victory and satisfaction and welcomed the double hosting decision.

== Bidding cities ==
=== Candidate cities ===
City	Country	National Olympic Committee	Result
Los Angeles	United States	United States Olympic Committee (USOC)	Unanimous
Main article: Los Angeles bid for the 2024 Summer Olympics On 26 April 2014, the Southern California Committee for the Olympic Games announced its bid proposal for the 2024 Olympics. On 28 July 2015, the USOC contacted Los Angeles about stepping in as a replacement bidder for the 2024 Summer Games after Boston dropped its bid. On 1 September 2015, the LA City Council voted 15–0 to support a bid for the 2024 Summer Olympics. The U.S. Olympic Committee finalised its selection moments after the LA City Council's vote. On 13 January 2016, Los Angeles 2024 committee officials said they were "thrilled to welcome" the construction of a $2-billion-plus, state-of-the-art football stadium in Inglewood, California and believed the arrival of one—and perhaps two—NFL teams would bolster its chances. On 25 January 2016, the Los Angeles 2024 committee announced that it planned to place its Olympic Village on the UCLA campus. LA 2024 also announced that media members and some Olympic officials would be housed in a 15-acre residential complex USC planned to build. On 16 February 2016, LA 2024 unveiled a new logo and its slogan, "Follow the sun." On 23 February 2016, more than 88% of Angelenos were in favor of the city's hosting the 2024 Olympic and Paralympic Games bid, according to a survey conducted by Loyola Marymount University. On 10 March 2016, Los Angeles officials bidding for the 2024 Summer Olympics turned their focus to temporary facilities that might be needed. Current plans include an elevated track built over the football field at the Los Angeles Memorial Coliseum and a proposal to temporarily convert Figueroa Street into a miles-long promenade for pedestrians and bicyclists. On 2 June 2016, the IOC confirmed that Los Angeles would proceed to the second stage of bidding for the 2024 Summer Games. On 29 July 2016, LA 2024 officials released artist renderings of an updated Los Angeles Memorial Coliseum and temporary swim stadium that would be used if Los Angeles is awarded the 2024 Summer Olympics. On 31 July 2016, Mayor Eric Garcetti led a 25-person contingent from Los Angeles to Rio de Janeiro to promote their city's bid for the 2024 Summer Olympics. On 7 September 2016, LA 2024 planned to send a 16-person delegation to the 2016 Paralympics in Rio de Janeiro as part of its ongoing campaign to bring the Olympics back to Southern California. On 13 September 2016, the LA 2024 bid committee released a two-minute video featuring a montage of local scenes narrated by children talking about their "dream city". On 23 September 2016, LA 2024 agreed to terms with the U.S. Olympic Committee on a required but controversial marketing arrangement. The Joint Marketing Program Agreement outlines shared responsibilities—and shared income—between Los Angeles and the USOC. On 7 October 2016, LA 2024 officials again made adjustments to their proposal for the 2024 Summer Olympics, moving half of a large and potentially expensive media center to the USC campus. On 21 October 2016, the LA 2024 bid committee again enlisted U.S. Olympians to help make the case for bringing the Summer Olympics back to Los Angeles. On 12 November 2016, Mayor Eric Garcetti and six-time gold medalist sprinter Allyson Felix led an LA 2024 presentation to an array of Olympic leaders and sports officials at a general assembly for the Assn. of National Olympic Committees in Doha, Qatar. On 23 November 2016, President-elect Trump expressed his support for Los Angeles's 2024 Olympic bid during a phone call with Mayor Garcetti. On 2 December 2016, LA 2024 released a new budget estimating it would spend $5.3 billion to stage the Games. On 2 January 2017, Angeleno Olympians and Paralympians rode on the Rose Parade float titled "Follow the Sun" to promote the city's bid. On 9 January 2017, LA 2024 issued a report predicting that the mega-sporting event would boost the local economy by $11.2 billion. On 25 January 2017, the Los Angeles City Council gave unanimous final approval for a privately run bid. On 28 February 2017, it was announced that four Hollywood film studios (Disney, Fox, NBCUniversal and Warner Bros) would be helping promote the Los Angeles bid. On 20 April 2017, the private committee trying to bring the Summer Olympics back to Los Angeles has issued a new set of renderings and videos showing what those Games might look like. Following the decision to award the 2024 and 2028 games simultaneously, Los Angeles announced that it would consider a bid for the 2028 Games, if certain conditions were met. On 31 July 2017, the IOC announced Los Angeles as the sole candidate for the 2028 games, with $1.8 billion of additional funding to support local sport and the Games programme.
Paris	France	French National Olympic and Sports Committee (CNOSF)	Unanimous
Main article: Paris bid for the 2024 Summer Olympics Paris formally announced its intention to bid on 23 June 2015. The former French Minister of Sports, Jean-Francois Lamour, identified the 2024 Olympics as a choice objective for a Parisian bid, and that it cannot tolerate another defeat. Tony Estanguet, a French slalom canoeist that won three Olympic gold medals (2000, 2004 and 2012), and co-president of the Paris 2024 bid committee, said that the only goal was to win, no matter what. €35 million will be budgeted to build new sports venues around Paris in order to improve the quality of the Parisian bid. On 8 November 2014, the mayor of Paris, Anne Hidalgo, suggested that the 2024 Olympics might be too expensive for Paris, stating, "We are in a financial and budgetary position today that does not allow me to say that I am making this bid." She discussed a potential bid for the 2028 Summer Olympics. However, in March 2015, Hidalgo gave her blessing to a bid for 2024. On 13 April 2015, the council of Paris approved the candidacy, making Paris an applicant. Since then, Mayor Hidalgo has been a strong supporter of the Parisian bid. Mayor Hidalgo and French president François Hollande went to Rio de Janeiro during the 2016 Summer Olympics to promote the Parisian bid. On 26 June 2015, the French Sailing Federation announced it had selected candidate venues interested in hosting the sailing competitions. Le Havre (Seine-Maritime), La Rochelle (Charente-Maritime), Brest (Finistère), Hyères (Var), Marseille (Bouches-du-Rhône) and Quiberon (Morbihan) were the venues being considered. On 7 September 2015, Marseille was chosen to host the sailing competitions. On 9 February 2016, Paris unveiled its 2024 Olympics logo. The city's iconic Arc De Triomphe was lit with the city's 2024 Olympic Games bid logo at 20:24 local time. A multi-coloured image of the Eiffel Tower with the words, "Paris, Candidate city, Olympic Games 2024" was screened onto the Arc at the top of the Champs-Élysées and on the town hall in Marseille. On 12 November 2016, Mayor Anne Hidalgo and eight-time World Championships gold medalist judoka Teddy Riner led a Paris 2024 contingent presentation to an array of Olympic leaders and sports officials at a general assembly in Doha, Qatar. In January 2017, Paris Committee proposed to slash carbon emissions by more than half compared to London and Rio and thus deliver the ‘most sustainable Games ever’. For the submission of the third and final application file of Paris's bid for the 2024 Olympic Games, the Eiffel Tower was adorned with Olympic colors on 3 February 2017. This illumination was organized to present the slogan of the Parisian bid: "Made for Sharing". In February 2017, led by Denis Coderre, Mayor of Montreal, more than 50 cities announced their support for the Paris 2024 bid, including Olympics host cities such as Sydney, Athens, Mexico City, Barcelona and Tokyo. At the end of February, mayor of Paris Anne Hidalgo went to Tokyo to meet the governor of the city Yuriko Koike and discuss the 2020 and 2024 Summer Olympics. Following the decision to award the 2024 and 2028 games simultaneously, Paris was understood to be the preferred host for the 2024 games. On 31 July 2017, the IOC announced Los Angeles as the sole candidate for the 2028 games, opening Paris up to be confirmed as hosts at the 131st IOC Conference on 13 September.
Budapest	Hungary	Hungarian Olympic Committee (MOB)	Withdrew bid
Main article: Budapest bid for the 2024 Summer Olympics In June 2015, the Assembly of the Hungarian Olympic Committee (MOB) and the Assembly of Budapest decided to bid for the Olympics. In July 2015, the Hungarian Parliament also voted to support the bid. On 28 January 2016, Budapest City Council approved the list of venues. Visiting Budapest in December 2015, IOC President Thomas Bach stated that Budapest is a “strong contender” for organizing the 2024 Summer Olympics the Agenda 2020 reforms. The recent position of the IOC is for more use of existing and temporary facilities so countries like Hungary, and cities like Budapest, can also have the opportunity to organize the Olympics. The intention is to support the same Olympic vision with an event that is cheaper and more profitable, with more sustainable facilities in several cities, perhaps on or across national boundaries in future. Budapest 2024 Bid Leader, Balázs Fürjes said about the games, “A Games in Budapest sends the message that the Olympic Games are not simply for the mega-city but for mid-size cities, too. Budapest can make Agenda 2020 real, a Budapest Games would give hope to new nations and new cities, nations and cities on the rise. It would spread the reach of the Olympic Movement and create new possibilities that will take forward the IOC’s new agenda”. Presenting details of the Budapest bid to a gathering of the world's National Olympic Committees and Olympic leaders in Doha, the Budapest 2024 delegation outlined a number of convincing points as to why Budapest is the “right sized city at the right time” to stage the Olympic Games in 2024. Prime Minister Viktor Orbán's government has thrown its full support behind the Budapest bid. He has said in a speech: "Hungary believes that sport is always more important than any other political interest, and that is why it must never be diverted into the arena of political battles. The Government supports the bid." He said that over the past 120 years the Olympics have become a “ passion” of the Hungarian people possibly “because the Olympic spirit represents such a pure form of freedom that was once rare here in Central Europe.” Hungarian officials are also representing the idea of “Organising an Olympic Games would be the pinnacle of this historical process. We are not only competing for ourselves, but representing the whole region.” Water and movement were the key elements of the Budapest 2024 logo, the result of a national contest that involved almost 200 artists, children, graphic designers and students. In January 2017, the "Nolympics 2024" campaign was started by the Momentum Movement, gaining the support of opposition parties including the LMP, Együtt, Párbeszéd, MSzP and DK. The Hungarian Two-tailed Dog Party, a satirical party, started a poster campaign supporting the Nolympics campaign. Most of the opposition parties and civil organizations have criticized the government for the bid, accusing it of corruption, and questioned the spending of money on the Olympic Games instead of developing health care, education and the transportation in Budapest. A total of 138,527 signatures of Budapestians would need to be collected by 17 February 2017 to trigger a referendum. The referendum would be held in Budapest and only the residents of the capital city would be able to cast a valid vote. On 17 February 2017, it was announced that 266,151 signatures had been collected. In response, chief organizer Fürjes accepted that the success of the petition campaign left the bid with "no chance" of success. On 22 February, Budapest withdrew its bid to host the 2024 Summer Olympics, leaving only Los Angeles and Paris in the race. On 24 February 2017, claiming that Budapest's doomed bid for the 2024 Summer Games was “overtaken by local politics,” the International Olympic Committee has reiterated it will consider changes in the way host cities are selected.
Hamburg	Germany	German Olympic Sports Federation (DOSB)	Withdrew bid
Main article: Hamburg bid for the 2024 Summer Olympics In October 2012, Thomas Bach, then-president of the DOSB, stated that Hamburg would apply for the 2024 Olympic Games. Hamburg could combine the water-based and the other non-water-based games in a very small circle, due to its good location. Hamburg would host the games the first time and would therefore be preferred to Berlin. On 16 March 2015, the DOSB proposed Hamburg to be the candidate city from Germany. On 21 March, the DOSB's general assembly confirmed the decision to allow Hamburg to bid for the games. For its 2024 bid, Hamburg re-used the logo and the slogan of an earlier bid to host the 2012 Summer Olympics. The logo showed a wave of water turning into a flame, referring to the water that is a defining aspect of Hamburg's cityscape and the Olympic flame. The slogan is "Feuer und Flamme", or "Fire and Flame", combining the Olympic flame with a German expression translating to "to be fire and flame for something", meaning to be very enthusiastic and/or excited about something. (West) Germany last hosted the 1972 Summer Olympics in Munich and also had recent experience with the success of the 1974 and 2006 World Cups, where Hamburg was one of the host cities. On 13 April, it was announced that Kiel would be Hamburg's venue for all sailing competitions. On 29 November, a referendum was held in which 51.6% of the citizens voted against a bid for the Olympics.
Rome	Italy	Italian National Olympic Committee (CONI)	Withdrew bid
Main article: Rome bid for the 2024 Summer Olympics On 15 December 2014, Prime Minister Matteo Renzi confirmed that Rome would be bidding for the 2024 Olympics. The same month it was also revealed that Pope Francis met with the head of the Italian Olympic Committee to discuss Vatican City hosting some events at the games, namely archery and football. On 10 February 2015, the Italian National Olympic Committee (CONI) confirmed that former Ferrari President Luca di Montezemolo, who headed the organising committee of the 1990 FIFA World Cup would lead Rome's bid as president of the Organising Committee. "I don't think anyone in Italy is as popular as Luca is abroad," said CONI President Giovanni Malagò. On 21 September 2016, Mayor of Rome Virginia Raggi told reporters the bid for the games would go no further. Raggi, whose party (the Five Star Movement) have long been opposed to Rome hosting the games, cited ongoing financial troubles in the country as the main reason for cancelling the bid. She said hosting the games would be "irresponsible" and would only cause the city to fall into further debt. On 11 October 2016, the bid was officially suspended, though not formally cancelled should any future city leaders want to revive it if they were to come into power before September 2017. On 17 October 2016, Olympic leaders continued to voice their displeasure with the political climate that forced Rome to suspend its bid for the 2024 Summer Games.

== Non-selected bids ==
=== 2024 ===
==== Europe ====
City	Country	National Olympic Committee	Bid Committee Website	Application Status
Berlin	Germany	Deutscher Olympischer Sportbund		Non-selected bid
The former mayor of Berlin, Klaus Wowereit, had stated that Berlin was exploring a bid for the 2024 or 2028 Olympic Games. Berlin hosted the 1936 Summer Olympics and last bid for the 2000 Summer Olympics, but was eliminated in the second round with the Olympics awarded to Sydney, Australia. As polls in Berlin showed, 55% of Berlin's population supported the application. Nevertheless, on 16 March 2015 the National Olympic Committee (DOSB) proposed Hamburg to be the candidate city from Germany.

==== United States ====
On 19 February 2013, the United States Olympic Committee (USOC) sent letters to the mayors of 35 American cities to gauge their interest in hosting the 2024 Olympics. The cities included were Atlanta, Austin, Baltimore, Boston, Charlotte, Chicago, Columbus, Dallas, Denver, Detroit, Houston, Indianapolis, Jacksonville, Las Vegas, Los Angeles, Memphis, Miami, Minneapolis–Saint Paul, Nashville, New York City, Orlando, Philadelphia, Phoenix, Pittsburgh, Portland, Rochester, Sacramento, San Antonio, San Diego, San Francisco, San Jose, Seattle, St. Louis, Tulsa, and Washington, D.C.

On 10 June 2014, the USOC met in Boston to confirm the shortlist of cities drawn up for the 2024 Olympics. On 13 June 2014, the USOC announced its shortlist for potential host cities: Boston, Los Angeles, San Francisco, and Washington. On 26 September 2014, The U.S. Olympic Committee polled forty-seven of its sports federations, forty of which answered the poll, all answering positively to the question of whether the USOC should bid to host the 2024 Olympic games. On 1 December 2014 all four shortlisted cities Boston, Los Angeles, San Francisco, and Washington met the final deadline to submit their bid proposals prior to the USOC Board Meeting held on 16 December 2014 in Redwood City, California. During the closed door meeting each of the four cities were given two hours to present their city's bids. Following the final presentation, the USOC announced that the United States would bid to host the 2024 Olympic and Paralympic Games, but did not announce which city would bid. On 8 January 2015, the USOC selected Boston to be the candidate city from the United States but on 27 July 2015 Boston's bid was withdrawn and the USOC bid process was reopened. On 1 September 2015 the USOC announced that Los Angeles was chosen for the United States bid for the 2024 Summer Games.

City	Country	National Olympic Committee	Bid Committee Website	Application Status
Boston	United States	United States Olympic Committee	2024boston.org	Non-selected bid
Main article: Boston bid for the 2024 Summer Olympics On 7 May 2013, there was a meeting held about the chance of Boston and New England hosting the Summer Games in 2024. There was a large group of leaders and politicians that supported the bid. Early proposed venues included TD Garden, Fenway Park, Gillette Stadium, Agganis Arena, Dunkin Donuts Center, and the SNHU Arena. In October, Deval Patrick signed a bill to let a group look into the bid. Boston lacked a stadium of sufficient size to use as an Olympic stadium, but had most of the venues for other sports within a close radius. Boston 2024 proposed building a temporary main Olympic Stadium with an unnamed developer providing an estimated $1.2 billion deck over a large rail yard in exchange for development rights for the property after the games. In January 2015, the USOC selected Boston as the official candidate city. Local public opinion on hosting the 2024 Games was divided; a March 2015 poll indicated that 52% of Boston area residents were opposed to hosting them. On 27 July 2015, the USOC dropped its bid to host the Olympics in Boston citing the lack of public support and uncertainties in the bid.
Washington, D.C.	United States	United States Olympic Committee	dc2024.org	Non-selected bid
Washington 2024, the bid team dedicated to bringing the 2024 Olympic and Paralympic Games to the Capital Region, was led by Russ Ramsey, a venture capitalist and philanthropist, and Ted Leonsis, owner of the Washington Wizards, Washington Capitals, and former America Online executive. Other key leadership included former NFL Commissioner Paul Tagliabue, BET co-founder and Washington Mystics President Sheila Johnson, Olympic silver-medalist and Washington developer Jair Lynch, celebrity chef José Andrés, former mayor of Washington, D.C. Anthony A. Williams, Under Armour founder Kevin Plank and others. The bid launched publicly in September 2014 with a theme of “Unity” that aimed to bring together leaders from the Nation's Capital in business, philanthropy, sports, and politics. Ultimately, the group assembled a vision of Washington that addressed its transit woes, harnessed the potential of both the Potomac and Anacostia rivers and escaped its reputation as a breeding ground for political dysfunction. All of these goals hoped to spur economic investment and serve as an inspirational event for Washington's young athletes. The group released a video in December 2014 that built on their theme of Unity by featuring an array of Washington citizens, sports figures like Washington Wizard John Wall and Washington Capital John Carlson, political icons like John Lewis, Newt Gingrich, Bob Dole, and Howard Dean, local political leaders like Tim Kaine, Mark Warner, Muriel Bowser, and Eleanor Holmes Norton, and many others. The bid team presented its case to the US Olympic Committee Board of Directors on 17 December 2014 with a presentation team of five that consisted of: Chairman Russ Ramsey, Vice-chairman Ted Leonsis, Board Member Paul Tagliabue, Mayor Muriel Bowser, and gold-medalist and Washington-area resident Katie Ledecky. On 9 January 2015, the USOC announced they would be endorsing Boston's bid for the 2024 Olympic Games, ending DC's hopes for 2024. Despite the loss, Washington remains enthusiastic about the plan devised during the bid process and optimistic about the city's future chances of hosting a major international sporting contest. In May 2015, Washington 2024 was presented the DC Building Industry Association Community Partnership Award by Mayor Muriel Bowser, during which Chairman Russ Ramsey said he thought the 2024 bid has “shelf-life”. The full plans devised by city planners Brailsford & Dunlavey and architecture firm Gensler were released to the Washington Post in June 2015 to wide praise by community and political leadership.

==== Proposed bids which did not go to application ====
- Baku, Azerbaijan

Baku submitted a bid for the 2016 Summer Olympics and submitted a bid for the 2020 Summer Olympics. Baku failed to become a candidate both times. Upon failing to become a candidate for the 2020 Games, it was stated that Baku would "come back again next time even stronger". Baku was chosen to host the 2015 European Games and had already hosted the 2012 FIFA U-17 Women's World Cup and various other international competitions, such as the 2011 World Amateur Boxing Championships, the Eurovision Song Contest 2012, and the 2016 European Grand Prix.

- Istanbul, Turkey

In November 2013, Hasan Arat, who was the head of the Istanbul 2020 Olympic bid, vowed that the campaign to bring the Olympic Games to Turkey would continue and that the next bid will be the strongest yet: "We are now better equipped and major sports events and we have a greater understanding of Olympic Games". Istanbul had lost bids for the games in 2000, 2008, and 2020 to Sydney, Beijing, and Tokyo respectively, and also bid for the 2004 and 2012 Summer Olympics, but failed to become a candidate both times.

- Kyiv, Ukraine

In March 2010, Ukrainian Deputy Prime Minister Borys Kolesnikov stated that if Ukraine successfully co-hosted the UEFA Euro 2012 with Poland, it might place a bid for hosting the 2024 Summer Olympics. Kyiv was one of the host cities of UEFA Euro 2012 and was the city where the final match was held.

- Doha, Qatar

Doha bid to host the 2016 Summer Olympics, in addition to bidding for the 2020 Summer Olympics. If Doha were to host the games, the games would be held from 14 to 30 October, due to Qatar's hot summer temperatures. Additionally it would also be the first games held in the Middle East region. After Doha failed to become a candidate for the 2016 and 2020 Games, it was stated that Doha looks "forward to the 2024 race". Doha hosted the 2006 Asian Games and was the location of several stadiums used for the 2022 FIFA World Cup, which was held across Qatar.

- Nairobi, Kenya

In August 2012, Kenyan Prime Minister Raila Odinga announced that the capital city Nairobi was planning to bid for the 2032 games.

- Casablanca, Morocco

In March 2011, the Moroccan government confirmed that it would begin construction of an 80,000-seat stadium and will bid for the 2028 Summer Olympics instead of 2024. Casablanca hosted the 1983 Mediterranean Games.

- Madrid, Spain

Ana Botella, Mayor of Madrid, confirmed that the city will not take part in the competition for 2024 Olympic Games after three failed consecutive bids (2012, 2016 and 2020, losing to London, Rio de Janeiro and Tokyo respectively). Despite this, all sporting projects and infrastructure of the 2020 Olympic bid would be finished on the date scheduled.

- Malaysia & Singapore

According to reports, a bid from Singapore and Malaysia was explored. Most likely, Kuala Lumpur and Singapore were to be the main cities. Malaysia bid in 2008, but failed to become a candidate. Kuala Lumpur received a 7.4 in transportation infrastructure, but nothing higher in any other category. Singapore was the host of the inaugural Youth Olympics in 2010 and the 117th IOC Session on July 6, 2005. Though previously not allowed by the Olympic Charter, recent changes have allowed multi-national bids. Despite this, it was acknowledged by the president of the Olympic council of Malaysia that it was too late to submit an Olympic bid for 2024, saying that the committees should focus on either the 2028 or 2032 games.

- Busan, South Korea

Postponed its plans to bid because Tokyo won the 2020 Games. The city hosted the 2002 Asian Games. The city decided to bid for the 2028 Summer Olympics instead. Pyeongchang hosted the 2018 Winter Olympics.

- Guadalajara, Mexico

On 31 March 2014 a political commission looking at the possibility of a Mexican bid for the 2024 Olympics concluded that there were no economic or infrastructure conditions in Mexico for a bid to take place.

- Various cities, United States

Aside from the three cities that were in consideration in the United States there were plans for an Olympic bid in a number of other cities:
San Francisco Bay Area
A San Francisco bid would likely have expanded to Oakland and other parts of the Bay Area for help in filling venue requirements such as indoor sports. Possible Bay Area venues included AT&T Park, Oracle Arena, Oakland Coliseum, SAP Center, Avaya Stadium, Levi's Stadium, and the projected Chase Center in San Francisco. Events could also have been held at area universities such as UC Berkeley's Haas Pavilion and Stanford Stadium. However, on 12 August 2015, it was announced that the Bay Area had pulled its bid.
Tulsa
Tulsa had been interested in bidding for the 2024 Olympic Games and was one of 35 cities to which the USOC had sent invitations. Following high-profile news reports in several national newspapers, city officials distanced themselves from the Tulsa 2024 Olympic Exploratory Committee and declined to bid. The committee was still seeking the bid as a private endeavor.
New York City
On 14 May 2014, a report in The Financial Times claimed that New York governor Andrew Cuomo was seriously considering an Olympic bid for New York City, if his administration received a proposal for the games. According to the Financial Times source, talks were taking place between the Governor and New York City Mayor Bill de Blasio, and an advisory committee would likely be formed soon. However, de Blasio decided against the bid in late May.
Philadelphia
On 22 April 2013, Mayor Michael Nutter's office declared Philadelphia's interest in bidding for the 2024 Games. The city had expressed interest in hosting the 2016 Games, but lost out to Chicago as the USOC's bid city. The City of Philadelphia withdrew from consideration on 28 May 2014 in a letter to the USOC, citing "timing" as a major factor in the decision. The city reiterated a continued interest in pursuing the games in the future. On 28 May 2014, Mayor Michael Nutter announced that he had written to the USOC earlier that month, informing it of the city's decision not to pursue a bid to host the 2024 Summer Olympic Games.
Dallas
Dallas had planned to bid for the 2024 Games, but it was not selected by the USOC as one of the four potential host cities.
San Diego
After the multinational bid with Tijuana was rejected, San Diego had explored a possible bid for the 2024 Games without Tijuana. It was not selected by the USOC as one of the four potential host cities.

- India

Ahmedabad
In 2015, before a visit by IOC president Thomas Bach, it was reported that the Indian government would propose the Gujarat city of Ahmedabad as a host city for the Olympics. Ahmedabad would later bid for the 2032 and 2036 Summer Olympics.

Delhi
Indian Prime Minister Narendra Modi and IOC president Thomas Bach agreed during a meeting on 27 April 2015 in Delhi that 2024 is too early for India to bid for hosting an Olympics. Delhi has hosted the 1951 Asian Games, 1982 Asian Games and 2010 Commonwealth Games.

- Durban and Johannesburg, South Africa

While South Africa was seen as a likely bidder for the 2024 Olympic Games, events ended its hopes of hosting the games. Due to Edmonton's decision to end its bid for the 2022 Commonwealth Games, Durban will host the games. South Africa's sports minister indicated on 1 March 2015 that the nation would focus on the Commonwealth Games instead of the Olympics.
Durban was removed as host of the 2022 Commonwealth Games on 13 March 2017 due to financial constraints.

- Brisbane and Melbourne, Australia

Australia, mainly Melbourne, had been seen as a likely bidder for the 2024 Summer Olympics. However, the head of the Australian Olympic Committee stated that Australia will focus on 2028 or 2032 instead of 2024. Melbourne hosted the 1956 Olympic Games and the 2006 Commonwealth Games and Brisbane hosted the 1982 Commonwealth Games. Queensland at the time was in the process of constructing and upgrading facilities in Brisbane and the Gold Coast for the 2018 Commonwealth Games.
Brisbane has been selected to host the 2032 Summer Olympics.

- Lima, Peru

In December 2013, the ex-president of the Peruvian Sports Institute (IPD), Arturo Woodman, declared that Lima should bid to host the Olympic Games in 2024. The city was host the 2019 Pan American Games. Akio Tamashiro, Affiliate Manager at IPD, stated that this would be the next target of the country, using the new infrastructure, experience and legacy of many sporting events as Lima 2019.

Due to the city winning the bid to host the 131st IOC Session in 2017, Lima cannot be a candidate city to host the 2024 Summer Olympics. On 22 January 2015, Lima lost its bid to host the World Games 2021 to Birmingham, Alabama.

- Saudi Arabia and Bahrain

Saudi Arabia has published plans to bid to host the games together with Bahrain. All men's events would be held in Saudi Arabia and all women's events in Bahrain, because women are not allowed to participate in sports in Saudi Arabia. The IOC has dismissed the plans and said this gender split would not be allowed.

- Taipei, Chinese Taipei

Taiwan's capital and largest city may put in a bid in accordance with a campaign promise made by then-presidential candidate Ma Ying-jeou while he was running for president in 2008. It is seen as the culmination of a build-up in hosting sporting events for Taipei and the rest of Taiwan. Taipei hosted the 2009 Deaflympics and the 2017 Summer Universiade, while Kaohsiung hosted the 2009 World Games. In 2011, President Ma Ying-jeou stated again that Taiwan will bid for the 2024 Games. On 11 June 2014, the Sports Administration reported that it has no intention of bidding for the 2024 Olympic Games.

- Saint Petersburg, Russia

On 19 May 2014, Governor of Saint Petersburg Georgy Poltavchenko said that the city can apply for hosting the Olympic Games in 2024. According to him, St. Petersburg already has about 70% of the infrastructure needed for the Olympics. Also on 22 May 2014, Deputy Prime Minister of the Russian Federation Dmitry Kozak, who was responsible for holding the 2014 Winter Olympics, said that St. Petersburg had a good chance to win the right to host the Olympics in 2024. According to him, a lot of costs would not be required to prepare the city for the Olympics. Russia has not hosted the Summer Games since the 1980 Summer Olympics in Moscow, when it was part of the Soviet Union. On 6 May 2015, it was announced that Russia will focus on the 2018 World Cup and not a bid for the 2024 Summer Olympic Games. St. Petersburg is also preparing to host UEFA Euro 2020, where it will act as one of the venues. Russia will also host the 2019 Winter Universiade in the Siberian city of Krasnoyarsk.
Sochi
Dmitry Chernyshenko, the organizer of the 2014 Winter Olympics, says there is a huge potential in bringing the games back to Sochi. Beijing will be the first city to host a summer and winter games after it won the right to hold the 2022 Winter Olympics. Sochi would need to build many facilities to hold the games, although some indoor arenas from the Winter Olympics could conceivably be re-purposed. Sochi was the first Russian city to consider a bid for the 2024 Summer Olympics. Sochi's bid for the 2024 Summer Olympics was canceled on 31 July 2015.

- Toronto, Ontario, Canada

Toronto's economic development committee voted against bidding for the 2024 games on 20 January 2014, citing a bid would cost the city $50 to 60 million. Toronto's mayor at the time, Rob Ford, suggested that a bid for the 2028 games may be more realistic. Toronto bid for the 1996 and 2008 Summer Olympics (as well as undocumented failures to make final rounds for 1960, 1964 and 1976), but lost to Atlanta and Beijing, respectively. In 2009, Toronto won the bid for the 2015 Pan American Games. However, discussions to submit a 2024 Olympic bid were revived during the lead-up to the 2015 Pan American Games, with new philosophical changes announced for the bidding process by the IOC, “to actively promote the maximum use of existing facilities”, which means that venues built for the Pan Ams may not have met IOC requirements but they could be adapted to comply under the new approach, boosting Toronto's viability as a host city. International Olympic Committee President Thomas Bach was among those who, in light of the Pan American Games, stated that Toronto would be a good candidate.
On the CBC Radio One Toronto morning show Metro Morning on 10 July 2015, Mayor John Tory acknowledged that the city could revisit the idea of hosting the 2024 games, pending the results of the 2015 Pan American Games, and the financial viability, effectively reopening the possibility of a Toronto bid. On 11 August 2015, Tory met with the head of the Canadian Olympic Committee to discuss the bid process and the city's previous bids. The COC encouraged the mayor to consider bidding. On 11 September 2015, the COC held a conference about a potential bid and voted unanimously in support for a Toronto bid for the 2024 games. This vote allowed the COC to prepare a letter of intent to send to the IOC by the September 15 deadline. On 15 September 2015, Mayor Tory announced that the city would not make a bid for the 2024 Summer Olympics.

=== 2028 ===
Due to the change in the bidding process, no other cities had formally announced their candidacy for the 2028 Games when Los Angeles was announced as a candidate. 2028 Summer Olympics to the IOC's decision to award the 2028 games to Los Angeles:

- Toronto, Ontario, Canada

Toronto's economic development committee voted against bidding for the 2024 games on 20 January 2014, citing a bid would cost the city $50 to 60 million. Toronto's mayor at the time, Rob Ford, suggested that a bid for the 2028 games may be more realistic. Toronto bid for the 1996 and 2008 Summer Olympics (as well as undocumented failures to make final rounds for 1960, 1964 and 1976), but lost to Atlanta and Beijing, respectively. Interest in bidding for the 2024 Summer Olympics was rekindled during the 2015 Pan American Games in Toronto. Following the event, though, Toronto Mayor John Tory reaffirmed the decision not to submit a bid. Since the IOC traditionally doesn't award consecutive Summer Olympics to the same continent, Toronto may not be able to bid again until 2036.

- Guadalajara, Mexico

On 31 March 2014, a political commission looking at the possibility of a Mexican bid for the 2024 Olympics concluded that there were no economic or infrastructure conditions in Mexico for a bid to take place. However, a bid for the 2028 or 2032 Olympics might be a possibility. Of note, 2028 would mark the 60th anniversary of the 1968 Summer Olympics, which were held in Mexico City.

- Budapest, Hungary

"Budapest can present a credible, competitive application for hosting the 2028 Olympics", Zsolt Borkai, the president of the Hungarian Olympic Committee told Hungarian business daily Napi Gazdaság on 7 July 2014. A report announced that Budapest was planning to bid on the 2028 Summer Olympics and the 2024 Summer Olympics. He additionally stated that Budapest was going to host the 2017 European Youth Olympic Festival, which was going to be like a practice for the 2028 Summer Olympics. However, he also said that Budapest would need to solve serious concerns surrounding transportation and Olympics sports facilities.

On 25 October 2013, Attila Szalay-Berzeviczy, head of the Budapest Olympics Movement (BOM), made a statement that Budapest had a "realistic chance" of hosting the 2028 Summer Olympics, but said Budapest would focus on a bid for the 2024 Summer Olympics first as a practice bid. Szalay-Berzeviczy also stated that the facilities in Hungary, such as transportation and sports venues, required significant work in advance of hosting any Olympics.

In January 2017, a civil organization called Momentum Movement started a petition to have a referendum for Budapest residents if they want to organize the Summer Olympics in 2024 or not. Several opposition parties, such as Lehet Más a Politika (LMP), Együtt, Párbeszéd Magyarországért (PM), Magyar Szocialista Párt (MSZP) and Demokratikus Koalíció (DK) joined to the movement, as well as Magyar Kétfarkú Kutya Párt (MKKP), which also started a satiric poster campaign against the bid in February. Most of the opposition parties and civil organizations have criticized the government for the bid, accusing it with corruption and spending the money on the Olympic Games instead of developing health care, education and the transportation in Budapest. A total of 138,527 signatures is required to be collected from Budapestians until 17 February 2017 to start a referendum. The referendum would be held in Budapest and only the residents of the capital city would be able to cast a valid vote. If Budapest withdraws from the 2024 Olympic race, there could still be a chance for a 2028 bid. On 22 February 2017, Budapest withdrew its bid to host the 2024 Summer Olympics, leaving only Los Angeles and Paris in the race. However, Budapest's Olympic dreams are still alive-and-well and Budapest is considering a future bid for 2032 at the earliest.

- Germany
  - Berlin

The former mayor of Berlin, Klaus Wowereit, had stated that Berlin was exploring a bid for the 2024 or 2028 Olympic Games. Berlin hosted the 1936 Summer Olympics and last bid for the 2000 Summer Olympics, but was eliminated in the second round with the Olympics awarded to Sydney, Australia. As polls in Berlin showed, 55% of Berlin's population supported the application to host the 2024 Games. On 16 March 2015, the National Olympic Committee (DOSB) proposed Hamburg to be the candidate city from Germany for the 2024 Summer Olympics. However, on 29 November 2015, a referendum was held in which 51.6% of the citizens voted against a bid for the Olympics. Although this means that Germany was no longer in the running for hosting the 2024 Summer Olympics, Berlin could still bid to host the 2028 or 2032 Games, which would mark 96 years after they last hosted the Summer Olympics in 1936 and 60 years after Munich 1972.

- Hamburg
Hamburg planned to bid for the 2024 Summer Olympics, and if they failed, to re-bid again at 2028. On 16 March 2015, the German Olympic Sports Confederation (DOSB) chose Hamburg for the official bid for the International Olympic Committee. In November 2015, the city held a referendum on withdrawing the potential bid. Although a majority 51.6 percent of residents voted against bidding for the Games 2024, with critics of the plan saying expected cost was too high, a bid for the 2028 or 2032 games is still possible and also is the preferred solution of the DOSB for 2028 or 2032, which would mark 60 years after Munich 1972.

- Rhine-Ruhr
In summer 2016, an Olympic bid for the Rhine-Ruhr metropolitan area was suggested. The area includes the Ruhr agglomeration and close-by large cities like Cologne, Düsseldorf, Dortmund and Essen. The bid would appeal to the new Olympic spirit of more regional, democratic and polycentric bids, fostering urban development. A high acceptance of 68 % among local citizens was reported by a Mentefactum survey in September 2016.

- Italy
  - Milan

Democratic Party's mayor of Milan, Giuseppe Sala, said that Milan could likely present a bid to host 2028 or 2032 Games in case Rome withdraws its candidature for the 2024 Olympics. Rome withdrew its 2024 Olympic Games bid on 21 September 2016. On 4 October 2016, Governor of Lombardy Region, Roberto Maroni, said he met CONI President, Giovanni Malagò, proposing Milan and its surrounding territories as Italian candidate city for 2028 Olympics, in the case that Los Angeles gets the 2024 Summer Olympics. The regional government would be ready to collaborate with the Italian National Olympic Committee. Milan was awarded the host city of the 2026 Winter Olympics with Cortina d'Ampezzo Milano-Cortina will host 2026 Winter Olympics.

- Naples
Mayor of Naples, Luigi De Magistris, said that the city is getting ready to be a likely candidate for the 2028 Olympics. The Olympic Summer Games would represent another major opportunity for Naples after having hosted 2019 Summer Universiade.

- Netherlands
  - Amsterdam
  - Rotterdam

On 29 October 2012, the Dutch cabinet, which was newly formed in 2012, announced that the government would no longer be supporting for the 2028 Summer Olympics, and that they wanted "Ambitions to get Dutch sports on an Olympic level, but without getting the Olympic Games to the Netherlands". The Dutch government consisting of the People's Party for Freedom and Democracy (VVD) and the Labour Party (PvdA) agreed in a discussion that the games were not going to get support. On 13 April 2014, the possible postponement of The Netherlands to host the 2028 Summer Olympics was reconfirmed, as Henk Stokhof, head of the Department of Sports at the City of Amsterdam, said during the SportAccord International Convention in Belek that the possible Amsterdam bid for 2028 Olympics was 'cut short due to fears of the cost of the bid'. However, he also said that the bid could be revived later, which the bid could be decided whether or not it would be done in the future as far as 2019 or 2020.

Rotterdam was to be the alternative option of the Amsterdam bid in the 2028 Summer Olympics. But with the Amsterdam bid being postponed, Rotterdam was also postponed.

2028 would mark the 100th anniversary of the 1928 Summer Olympics, which were also hosted in the Dutch capital.

- Russia
  - Kazan

Kazan hosted the 2015 World Aquatics Championships and the 2013 Summer Universiade. It will also be one of the host cities for the 2018 World Cup. The city has dubbed itself the "sports capital of Russia." "The door is closing and the Russian Olympic Committee, as far as I know, has no intention to put in a bid for the 2024 summer games," said Popov. "I don't think Kazan will bid for '24 but maybe for the future, '28." A lot of infrastructure was built for past events. Russia last hosted the Summer Olympic Games in 1980, in Moscow, as the Soviet Union.

- Saint Petersburg
On 18 October 2013, Mikhail Radko, the leader of the group considering a possible 2024 Summer Olympics or 2028 Summer Olympics bid for Saint Petersburg told to Around the Rings (ATR) publication that the city is most likely going to bid for the 2024 Summer Olympics, but mentioned that the city may change to the 2028 bid for which it may have a better chance. Radko also wrote a letter to the public specifically mentioning about the 2028 Summer Olympics bid for Saint Petersburg, saying that the place was an 'open city' for the Olympics. However, St. Petersburg may be a likely candidate for 2032.

- Sochi
Dmitry Chernyshenko, the organizer of the 2014 Winter Olympics, says there's a huge potential in bringing the games back to Sochi. He revealed that he wants Sochi to follow the example of Beijing which will be the first city to host a summer and winter games. Sochi would need to build many facilities to hold the games, although some indoor arenas from the Winter Olympics could conceivably be repurposed.

- Madrid, Spain

Manuela Carmena, Mayor of Madrid, confirmed that the city will not take part in the competition for 2024 Olympic Games after three failed consecutive bids (2012, 2016 and 2020, losing to London, Rio de Janeiro and Tokyo respectively). Despite this, all sporting projects and infrastructure of the 2020 Olympic bid would be finished on the date scheduled. However, Madrid could be a likely candidate for 2032, which would mark the 40th anniversary of the last time Spain hosted the Olympics in Barcelona in 1992.

- Busan, South Korea

On 6 October 2014, Suh Byung-Soo, the Mayor of Busan, has confirmed that the city will be planning to bid for the 2028 Summer Olympics, noting that the city has matured on its capacity for hosting global events, and that the city will announce its bid to the International Olympic Committee in 2020. The mayor also said that 2028 will mark the 40th anniversary of the 1988 Summer Olympics that were hosted in the South Korean capital city Seoul, and is the last Summer Olympics to be held in South Korea.

Busan had planned to bid for the 2020 Summer Olympics in 2005. However, because Pyeongchang, South Korea won the 2018 Winter Olympics in 2011, officials pushed the bid to 2024 Summer Olympics, believing that the bid would be too close to each other as the same country. But in 2013, with Tokyo, Japan being awarded the 2020 Summer Olympics and the games again being in East Asia, Busan further pushed their bid to 2028. Busan also had thought of bidding for the 2016 Summer Olympics, but the city dropped the idea because of Pyeongchang's bid for the 2014 winter games.

Officials in Busan said that the 2020 Summer Olympics in Tokyo would help boost tourism in Busan if they were to host the 2028 Summer Olympics, and also state that they have several existing venues that could be used. Incheon has stated that as they improve their status as a city, they could be able to handle a co-hosted Olympic Games, since they could re-use their sport facilities.

Busan hosted the 1997 East Asian Games, 2002 Asian Games, and acted as one of the venues for the 2002 FIFA World Cup. During the 1988 Summer Olympics hosted by Seoul, Busan was the site of the games' sailing (then yachting) events.

- Doha, Qatar

In February 2016, Thani Al-Kuwari, secretary-general of the Qatar Olympic Committee, said that the country would unquestionably bid on a future Olympics. AFP reported that at a sports conference in Doha Al-Kuwari said, “The vision and the target is to host one of the Olympics one day. So we are hoping to have one day, you never know, Maybe 2028.” Doha bid for the 2016 and 2020 Olympics, both times it failed to become a candidate. Qatar hosted the 2015 World Men's Handball Championship, the 2015 AIBA World Boxing Championships, the 2015 IPC Athletics World Championships and the 2022 FIFA World Cup, and will host the 2023 FINA World Aquatics Championships.

- Kuala Lumpur, Malaysia and Singapore

Tunku Tan Sri Imran Tuanku Ja’afar, the president of Olympic Council of Malaysia have expressed his intention of having a dual host bid for 2028 or 2032. "Doing it all on our own may be beyond us but under the new Olympic reform agenda, the IOC allow twin bids. I do see a joint bid between Kuala Lumpur and Singapore in the future,” IOC president, Thomas Bach also have been reported of hoping the Olympics to be held in Southeast Asia. Singapore National Olympic Council have been remarked that it was an "...interesting concept." Malaysia have since held a Commonwealth Games in 1998 while Singapore have held Youth Olympic Games in 2010. Both countries acknowledged that infrastructure is not a problem but lack of world class athletes and magnitude of the Games have been noted as problems of having a single host bid.

- Casablanca, Morocco

In March 2011, the Moroccan government confirmed that it would begin construction of an 80,000-seat stadium and would bid for the 2028 instead of 2024.

- Nairobi, Kenya

A number of Kenyan officials including Ochilo Ayacko (former Minister of Sports to the former Prime Minister Raila Odinga) and the former Vice President Kalonzo Musyoka had stated that they had intentions to bring the 2028 Summer Olympics or the 2032 Summer Olympics to Kenya. To further their support, they had also appointed Moi International Sports Centre (MISC) in Kasarani, to take charge of the sport facilities in Kenya. The officials, however, also mentioned the considerable difficulties they were going to have to face with facilities and financing.

International Business also stated that both the 2024 Summer Olympics and the 2028 Summer Olympics Nairobi planned to bid on and the 2032 Summer Olympics Nairobi was planning to bid on will be 'a long shot', according to Ed Hula, the chief editor of Around the Rings.

- Johannesburg, South Africa

The Boston Globe reported on 11 January 2015 that Johannesburg was continuing with their bid for the 2028 Summer Games. Johannesburg hosted the 2010 FIFA World Cup Final, and South Africa unsuccessfully bid for the 2004 Summer Olympics, which were awarded to Athens.

- Buenos Aires, Argentina

Buenos Aires bid to host the 2018 Summer Youth Olympics. It was stated that the successful bid could lead to a bid for the 2028 or 2032 Summer Olympic Games. The city also hosted the 125th IOC Session in 2013. Rio de Janeiro staged the first Summer Olympic Games in South America in 2016. Buenos Aires could potentially be the second city on the continent to stage the event. Buenos Aires bid to host the 1936, 1956, 1968, and 2004 Summer Olympics, but lost to Berlin, Melbourne, Mexico City and Athens respectively. On 4 July 2013, Buenos Aires was elected as the host city of the 2018 Summer Youth Olympics. In July 2016, Thomas Bach, president of the International Olympic Committee, said that "Buenos Aires is able to present a successful bid for 2028 or 2032". In January 2017, the Argentine Olympic Committee presented Buenos Aires as candidate to host the 2023 Pan American Games. Buenos Aires lost to the city of Santiago de Chile.

- Australia
  - Brisbane, Queensland

Brisbane considered a bid for the 2032 Summer Olympics. The city had the backing of the AOC and had support from IOC vice president John Coates. The city hosted the 1982 Commonwealth Games, the 2001 Goodwill Games and the annual Brisbane International and State of Origin. Brisbane made a bid to host the 1992 Olympics, however they were awarded to Barcelona.
On 22 August 2016, Brisbane consented to provide $870k to conduct a year-long Olympics feasibility study.
On 21 July 2021, Brisbane was selected by the International Olympic Committee to host the 2032 Summer Olympics.

- Melbourne, Victoria
The former Premier of Victoria, Denis Napthine, backed a potential bid from Melbourne for the 2028 Summer Olympics. Melbourne hosted the 1956 Summer Olympics and the 2006 Commonwealth Games, and Australia hosted the 2000 Summer Olympics in Sydney. Melbourne had also unsuccessfully bid for the 1996 Summer Olympics, which were awarded to Atlanta in 1990. The AOC and IOC have preferenced Brisbane as being the next candidate city, however Melbourne would bid should Brisbane pull out of the race. If Brisbane bid and failed then Melbourne would move forward with a 2032 Olympics bid. Discussion has also raised the possibility of a joint Australia bid, staging the main event in Melbourne whilst co-hosting some outdoor events in Brisbane and Perth.

== Proposed dates and slogans ==
	Games of the XXXIII Olympiad	XVII Paralympic Games	Slogan
Paris	2-18 August	4-15 September	"Made for sharing"
Los Angeles	19 July - 4 August	18-29 August	"Follow the sun"
