= Birmingham bid for the 2022 Commonwealth Games =

Bid to host the 2022 Commonwealth Games

- Logo of Birmingham's 2022 Commonwealth Games bid
- Host city: Birmingham, England
- Motto: Heart of the UK, Soul of the Commonwealth
- Main venue: Alexander Stadium
- Website: http://www.birmingham2022.com/

The Birmingham bid for the 2022 Commonwealth Games was a bid by Birmingham, England and Commonwealth Games England to host the 2022 Commonwealth Games. On 21 December 2017 it was announced that the bid has been successful.

== Background ==
Birmingham was actually planning to bid for the 2026 Commonwealth Games. On 13 March 2017, Commonwealth Games Federation stripped Durban, South Africa of their rights to host the 2022 Commonwealth Games and reopened the bid process for the 2022 games. On 19 June 2017 Birmingham announced its bid to host the 2022 Commonwealth Games along with unveiling of its bid logo.

The bid had the full support of: Birmingham City Council; three regional local enterprise partnerships (Greater Birmingham and Solihull Local Enterprise Partnership; Black Country Local Enterprise Partnership; Coventry and Warwickshire Local Enterprise Partnership); the West Midlands Combined Authority, the West Midlands Growth Company and the newly elected Mayor of West Midlands, Andy Street. Four-time Olympic gold medallist and multiple world champion Sir Mo Farah and CEO of Aston Villa F.C. Keith Wyness also supported the bid.

Birmingham had also bid to host the 1992 Summer Olympics, but Barcelona was selected.

== Previous events hosted ==
Birmingham has a track record of delivering large international sporting and cultural events, such as:

- The Ashes test matches
- 1993 World Artistic Gymnastics Championships
- Yonex All England Open Badminton Championships since 1994
- 1995 World Netball Championships
- Eurovision Song Contest 1998
- 2007 European Athletics Indoor Championships
- 2010 European Men's Artistic Gymnastics Championships
- 2011 Trampoline World Championships
- 2012 UCI BMX World Championships
- 2015 Rugby World Cup fixtures
- 2017 ICC Champions Trophy
- 2018 World Indoor Athletics Championships
- IAAF Diamond League
- Davis Cup tennis
- Aegon Classic tennis championships

== Venues ==
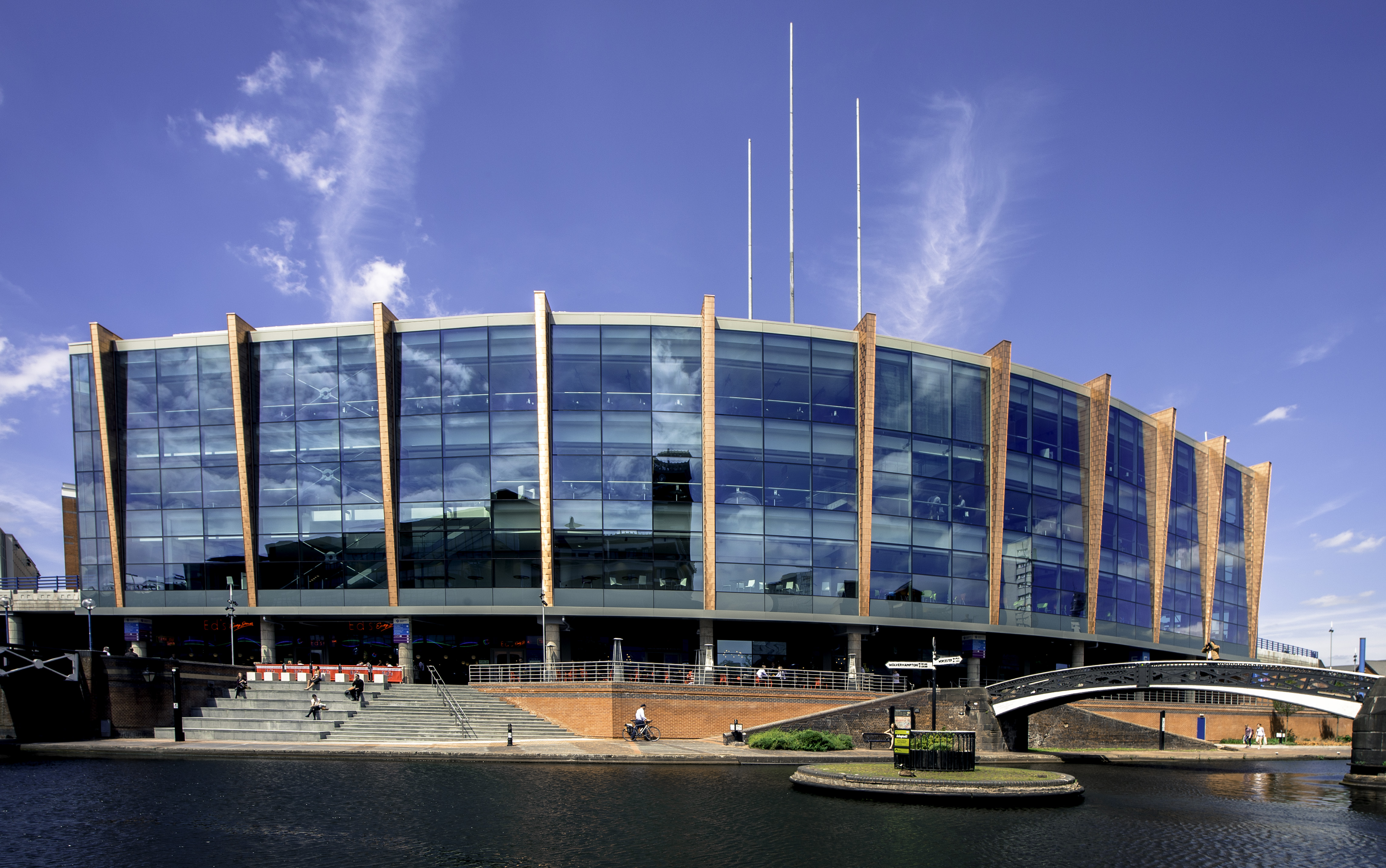
Arena Birmingham

Birmingham has a number of existing sports venues, arenas and conference halls that are suited for hosting sport during the Games. 95% of the competition venues were already in place for the 2022 games. Alexander Stadium which will host the ceremonies and athletics will be renovated and the capacity will be increased from 12,000 to 50,000 seats. A 400-metre warm up track will also be developed. This would leave the stadium well placed to become the home of UK Athletics, hosting all the major national and international competitions after the Games.

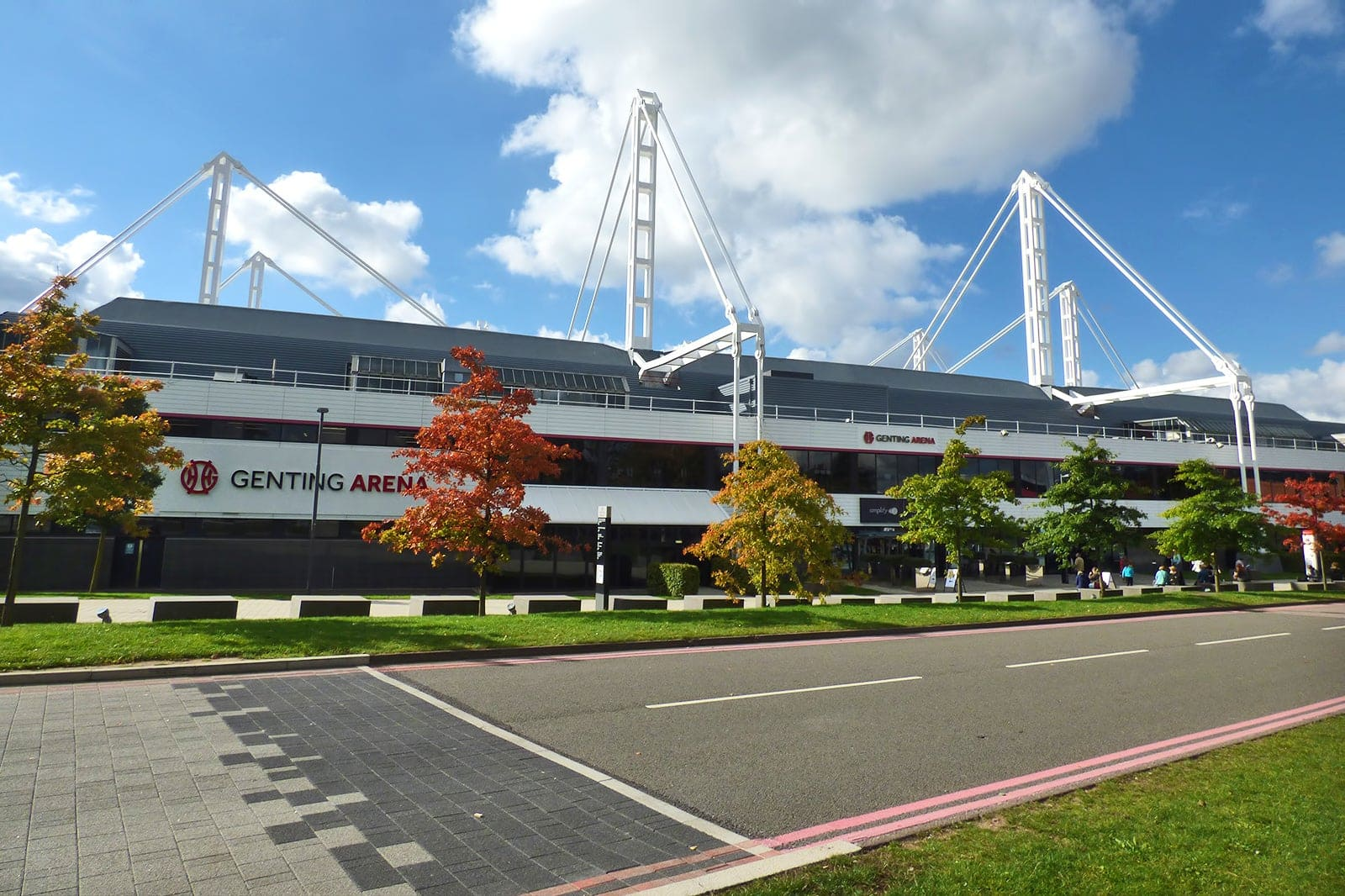
Genting Arena

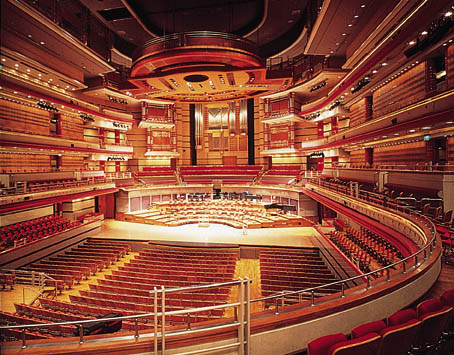
Symphony Hall

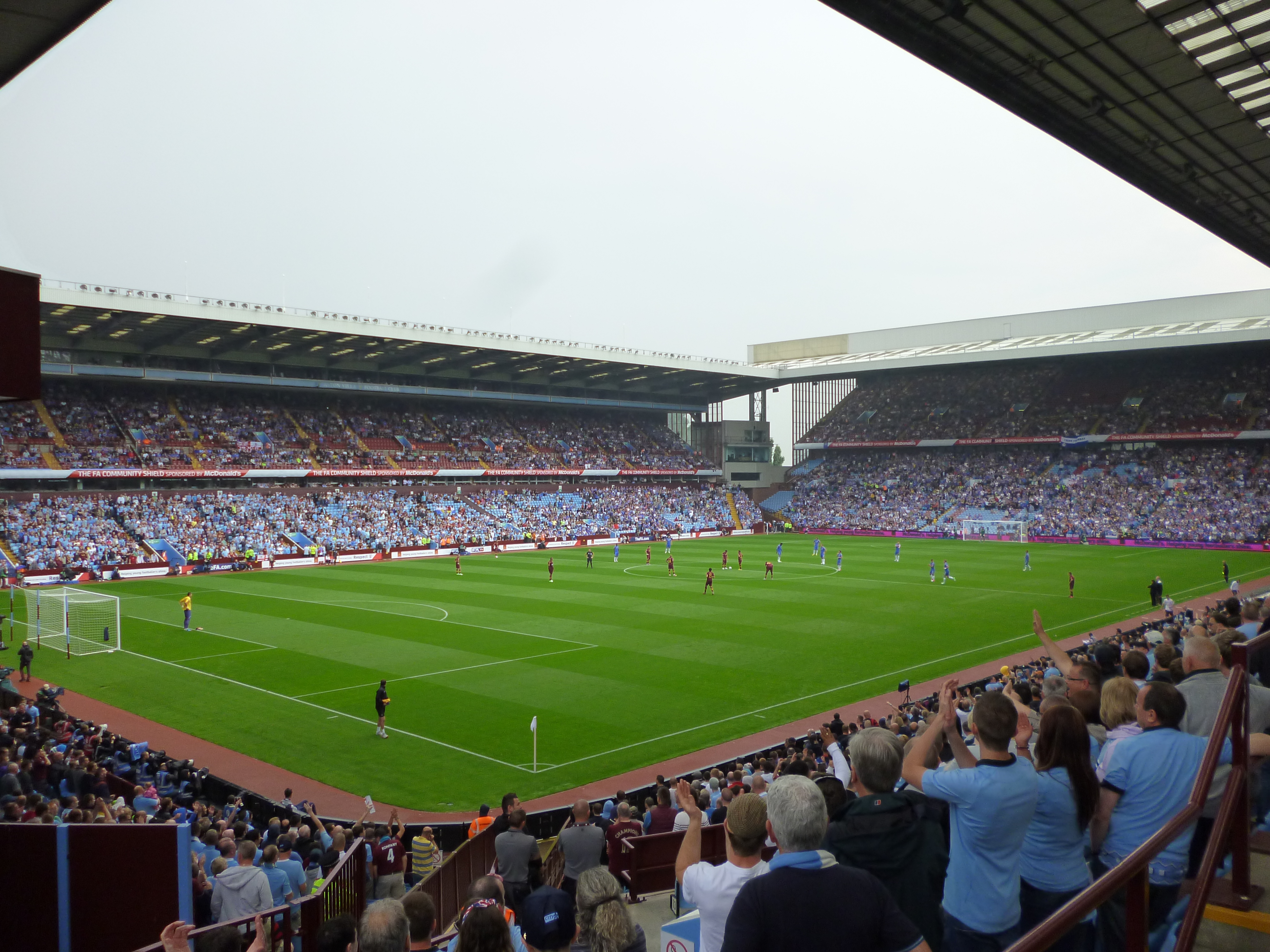
Villa Park Stadium

=== Venues in Birmingham ===
Venue	Sport	Capacity	Status
Alexander Stadium	Ceremonies Athletics	50,000	Upgrade
National Exhibition Centre	Boxing Judo Table Tennis Freestyle Wrestling	5,000	Existing
Genting Arena	Badminton	15,000	Existing
Arena Birmingham	Artistic and Rhythmic Gymnastics	15,000	Existing
Symphony Hall	Weightlifting Para Powerlifting	2,200	Existing
University of Birmingham	Squash Hockey	5,000	Existing
Sandwell Aquatics Centre	Swimming Para Swimming Diving	5,000	New
Villa Park Stadium	Rugby 7s	42,000	Existing
Victoria Square	Basketball	3,000	Existing

=== Venues outside Birmingham ===
Venue	Sport	Capacity	Status
Ericsson Indoor Arena	Netball	7,000	Existing
Victoria Park, Leamington	Bowls	2,000	Existing

== See also ==
- Birmingham bid for the 1992 Summer Olympics
- 2002 Commonwealth Games at Manchester, England
- 1934 Commonwealth Games at London, England
