= Paris bid for the 2024 Summer Olympics =

Bid for the 2024 Summer Olympics

Bids for the 2024 Summer Olympics and Paralympics
Overview
- Games of the XXXIII Olympiad; XVII Paralympic Games

Details
- City: Paris, France
- Chair: Bernard Lapasset and Tony Estanguet
- NOC: French National Olympic and Sports Committee (CNOSF)

Previous Games hosted
- 1900 Summer Olympics; 1924 Summer Olympics; Bid for 1992, 2008 and 2012

Decision
- Result: Los Angeles withdraw from 2024 to bid for 2028, so it won.

Paris 2024 is the successful bid to bring the Games of the XXXIII Olympiad and the XVII Paralympic Games, to the French capital city. Paris formally announced its intention to bid on 23 June 2015 – the date on which Olympic Day is globally celebrated. Following withdrawals in the 2024 Summer Olympics bidding process that led to just two candidate cities (Los Angeles and Paris), the IOC announced that the 2028 Summer Olympics would be awarded at the same time as the 2024 Games. After Los Angeles agreed on 31 July 2017 to host the 2028 Games, Paris was the only candidate city left in the bidding process for the 2024 Games. It was officially announced at the IOC Session in Lima, Peru.

Paris previously hosted the 1900 Summer Olympics and the 1924 Summer Olympics. Paris will be the second city (after London) to host the Olympic Games three times. Of note, 2024 marked the 100th anniversary of 1924 Summer Olympics, as well as the first Olympic Winter Games in Chamonix. On July 31, 2017, it was announced that rival bidder Los Angeles would host in 2028, effectively giving Paris the 2024 games.

== Proposed dates ==
The Olympic Games were originally proposed to be held from 2 to 18 August 2024; while the Paralympic Games were proposed to be held from 4 to 15 September 2024. Due to a strategic issue, in February 2018, both the IOC and the organisers agreed to bring the Games forward by a week for logistical reasons.

== Planned Venues ==
The venues are situated mainly in Paris. They also include Saint-Denis, Le Bourget, the Stade Olympique Yves-du-Manoir in Colombes, a centrepiece of the 1924 games, Vaires-sur-Marne, Versailles and a 600-kilometre (370 mi) venue for sailing in Marseille. Environmental concerns are taken into account, as there will be nine temporary venues and only three new ones in a total of forty – 95% of venues are existing or temporary.

=== Grand Paris Zone ===
- Stade de France — Opening and closing ceremonies and athletics, 75,000
- Seine-Saint-Denis — Aquatics Centre (diving, swimming, synchronised swimming), 17,000
- Water Polo Arena (Piscine de Marville) — Water polo, 6,250
- Le Bourget – Pavilion I – Badminton (temporary), 7,850
- Le Bourget – Pavilion II – Volleyball (temporary), 18,570 (13,010 in main court and 5,560 in secondary court)
- Le Bourget Shooting range – Shooting (temporary), 4,120
- Stade Olympique Yves-du-Manoir, Colombes – Hockey, 18,520
- U Arena, Nanterre — Gymnastics (artistic, trampoline and rhythmic), 17,500
- Palais des sports Marcel-Cerdan, Levallois-Perret – Basketball (women's preliminaries), 5,000

=== Paris Centre Zone ===
- Champ de Mars — Beach volleyball (temporary), 12,860
- Eiffel Tower and river Seine — Open water swimming, triathlon, surfing (temporary) 3,390 (10,000)
- Champs-Élysées — Cycling (road), skateboarding (street), athletics (marathons and race walks) (temporary) 4,470 (25,000),
- Grand Palais — Fencing, taekwondo, 8,000
- Les Invalides — Archery (temporary), 8,000
- Jardins des Tuileries – Skateboarding (park) (temporary), 10,000
- Paris expo Porte de Versailles – Sport climbing (temporary), 6,650
- Halle Georges Carpentier – Table tennis, 5,009
- Stade Charléty – Baseball/softball (if accepted), 20,000
- Stade Jean-Bouin – Rugby, 20,000
- Stade Roland Garros — Tennis, 24,750
  - Court Philippe Chatrier – Handball (play-offs), 15,000
  - Court Suzanne Lenglen – Boxing, 10,000
  - Court des Serres – Karate, 5,000
  - other courts – Tennis, 2 000 + 8x250
- Parc des Princes – Football (preliminaries, semifinal, finals), 61,691
- Stade Pierre de Coubertin – Handball (preliminaries), 5,000
- Le Zénith – Weightlifting, 5,238
- Bercy Arena – Judo, basketball (men's last preliminary round, play-offs), 16,208
- Bercy Arena II – Basketball (preliminaries, not all), wrestling, 8,000

=== Versailles Zone ===
- Le Golf National — Golf, 32,720
- Vélodrome de Saint-Quentin-en-Yvelines — Cycling (track, BMX), modern pentathlon (fencing), two stands seating 5,000 and BMX 7,040
- Château de Versailles — Equestrian, modern pentathlon, 22,500 (dressage, jumping, modern pentathlon in temporary stadium), 40,000 (temporary circuit in the garden)
- Élancourt Hill — Mountain bike, 22,740

=== Stand-alone venues ===
Tour Montparnasse displaying the Paris 2024 Olympic bid logo at sunset, June 17, 2017.

- Vaires-sur-Marne — Rowing, canoeing (kayak and slalom), 24,000 (flatwater), 12,000 (slalom)
- Marseille — Sailing, 15,640

=== Non-competitive venues ===
- Le Bourget – Main press centre, international broadcast centre, media village
- L'Île-Saint-Denis (will be built) – Olympic Village
- Marseille Chanot Exhibition Park – Satellite Olympic Village for football (also teams playing elsewhere than Lille, Nantes or Paris) and sailing athletes

=== Football venues (9 bidding cities) ===
- Stade Vélodrome, Marseille, 67,000
- Parc des Princes, Paris, 61,000 (finals)
- Parc Olympique Lyonnais, Lyon, 59,000
- Stade Pierre-Mauroy, Lille, 50,000
- Nouveau Stade de Bordeaux, Bordeaux, 42,000
- Stade Geoffroy Guichard, Saint-Étienne, 42,000
- Stade de la Beaujoire, Nantes (renovated), 38,000
- Allianz Riviera, Nice, 35,000
- Stadium Municipal, Toulouse, 32,000

== Logo ==
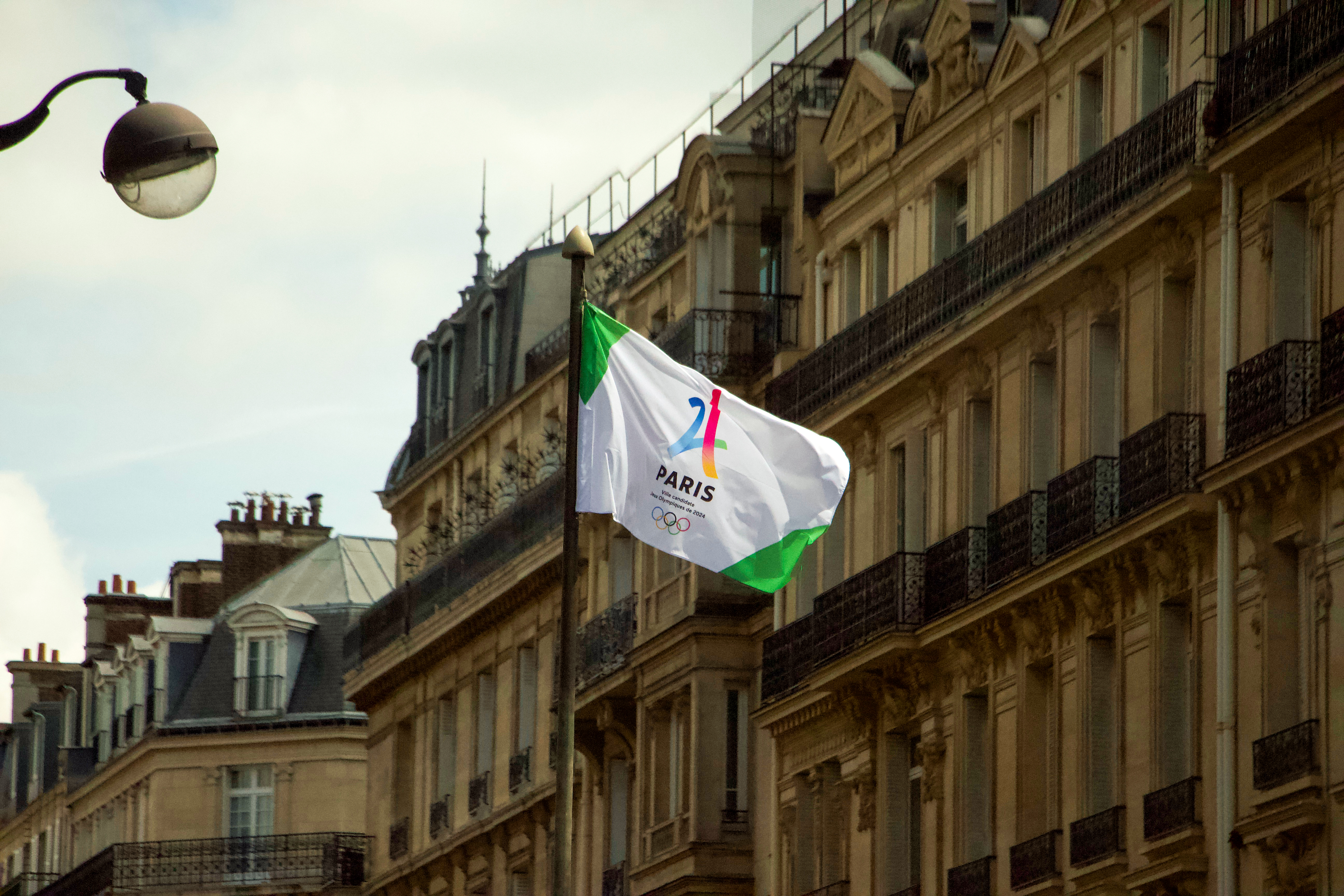
Paris 2024 Olympic bid flag flying in central Paris, June 17, 2017.

The bid logo was unveiled on 9 February 2016 at the Arc de Triomphe, The logo symbolises the dynamic ribbons colors of the Olympic rings shaping the iconic Eiffel Tower with the "2" and "4" represents the number "24" and the year "2024". The bid logo was designed by French agency Dragon Rouge.

== Slogan ==
The slogan was launched on 3 February 2017, at the Eiffel Tower: Made for Sharing (French: "Venez Partager").

== Promotion ==
The bid was heavily promoted during the 2017 Tour de France. Members of the bid team assisted in presenting the yellow jersey to the race leader after each day's stage, and during the final day in Paris the riders rode through the Grand Palais (site of the fencing and taekwondo events) en route to the final laps on the Champs-Élysées. Additionally, during stage 12 from Pau to Peyragudes, a special marker was placed at kilometer 2024 overall in the race to promote the bid.

== See also ==
- Paris bid for the 2012 Summer Olympics
