= Doha bid for the 2020 Summer Olympics =

Bids for the 2020 Summer Olympics
Overview
- Games of the XXXII Olympiad

Details
- City: Doha, Qatar
- Chair: Sheikh Tamim Bin Hamad Al Thani
- NOC: Qatar Olympic Committee (QAT)

Previous Games hosted
- None bid for 2016

Doha 2020 (Arabic: الدوحة 2020) was a bid for the 2020 Summer Olympics by the city of Doha and the Qatar Olympic Committee.

== History ==
On August 7, 2008, Sheikh Tamim Bin Hamad Al Thani, the Heir Apparent of Qatar, revealed that the Qatar would bid for the 2020 Games. Sheikh Tamim, who is also the chairman of the Qatar Olympic Committee, said that Qatar was determined to learn from the lessons of its failed 2016 bid, and "bid for hosting the Olympic Games in 2020 as per set measures and standards." Doha bid to host the 2016 Summer Olympics but failed to become a candidate. The IOC cited technical reasons for its rejection of the bid, including Doha's insistence on holding the Games in October, because of its unsuitably hot weather in August. The 2016 Games were ultimately awarded to Rio de Janeiro. Doha once again proposed to the IOC that the games be organized in autumn rather than the summer due to Qatar's extremely hot summer weather. In August 2011 the IOC and the Qatar bid team held talks after which Doha was given permission to host the games outside the traditional timeframe. Thus Doha made their bid official.

Doha's Olympic bid proposed to hold the games outside of the traditional summer period for the games (July 15-August 31) and placing them between September and October, which would avoid Doha's midsummer period of very hot weather. Qatar was awarded the right to host the 2022 FIFA World Cup on December 2, 2010. Several of the stadiums for the World Cup will be located in Doha. Doha hosted the 2006 Asian Games, 2011 Pan Arab Games and hosted multiple matches of the 2011 AFC Asian Cup.

Upon being accepted as an Applicant City, the IOC asked Doha to take steps to ensure the health of athletes should Doha be selected, and the IOC was to publish a list of events which must take place in the morning or late afternoon due to the heat that the city experiences. The IOC gave assurances that these changes would not negatively affect the organization of the games or the international broadcasts of the games. The IOC also requested a plan be drawn up to protect the health of the public in attendance and the staff who would help out at the games. IOC President Jacques Rogge said that no outdoor sports would be able to take place between 10 am and 6 pm due to the heat. The IOC consulted its own medical experts and International Federations in regard to Qatar's heat. They agreed that outdoor sports would need to take place in the early morning and evening. The IOC studied the logistics of arranging broadcasts of events.

On October 1, 2011 it was announced that Sheikh Tamim Bin Hamad Al Thani, who serves as President of the Qatar Olympic Committee and is an IOC member would head the Doha 2020 bid committee. Sheikha Al Mayassa bint Hamad bin Khalifa Al-Thani and Sheikh Saoud bin Abdulrahman Al-Thani will serve as vice presidents of the bid committee.

On October 12, 2011 Doha 2020 appointed Vero Communications and Andrew Craig as the bid's lead advisors.

As 2011 drew to a close, the bid received the support of the leaders of Bahrain, Kuwait, Oman, Qatar, Saudi Arabia and the United Arab Emirates, which gave the bid the full support of the Gulf Cooperation Council.

In January 2012, the Doha 2020 delegation went to Innsbruck for the 2012 Winter Youth Olympics and stated the support for the games.

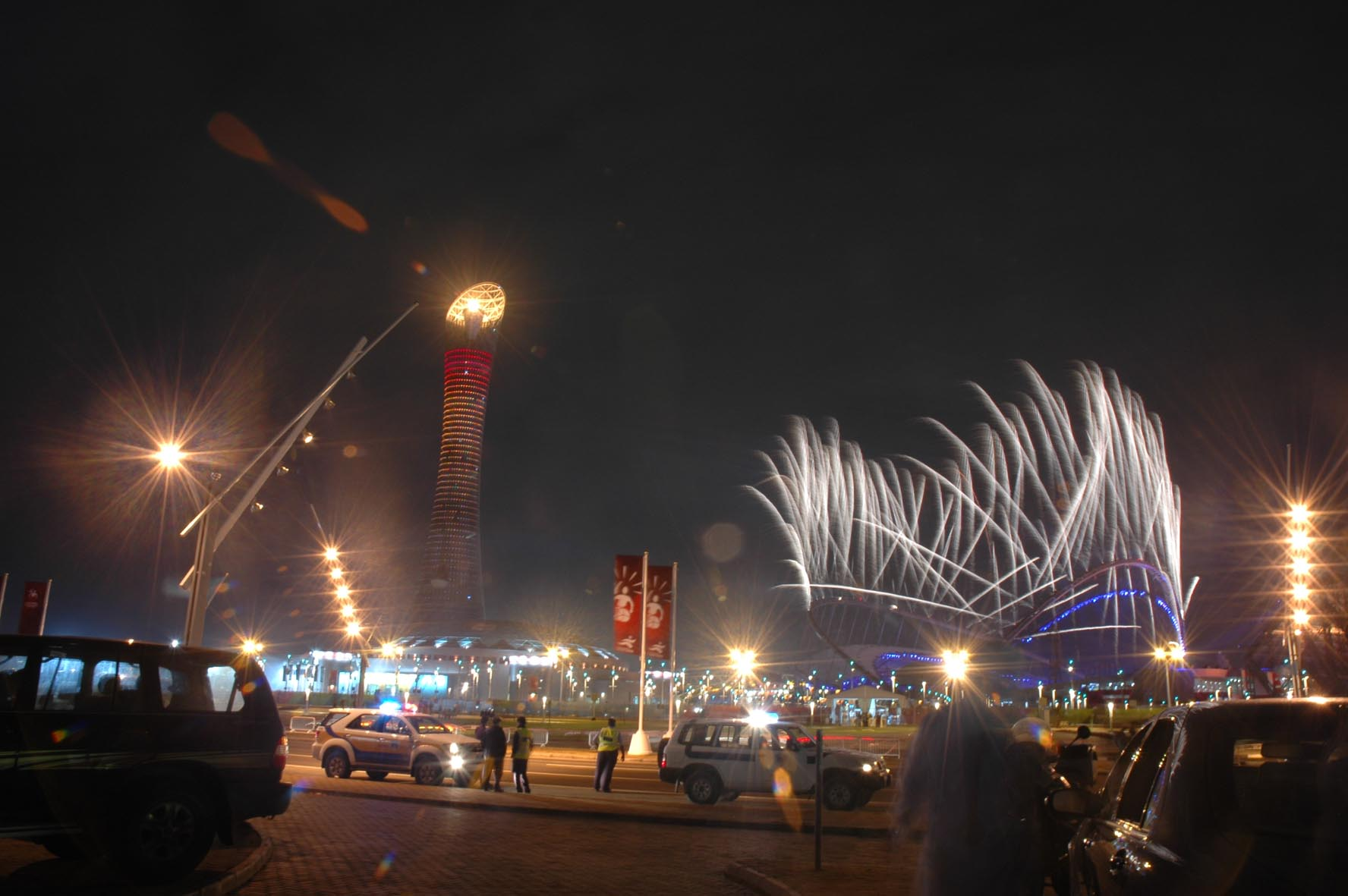
Fireworks at the 2006 Asian Games

Doha 2020 unveil their bid logo, slogan and website on February 10, 2012. Their bid slogan was "Inspiring Change", to highlight the changes taking place in the Middle East over the previous year.

In April 2012, Doha's Olympic bid received a boost when the city was awarded the 2014 FINA World Swimming Championships. Later that month Doha was also awarded the 2012 World Squash Championships.

=== Outlook, conclusion and future ===
Doha failed to become a Candidate City when the IOC selected Istanbul, Tokyo, and Madrid as candidate cities on May 23, 2012. Doha vowed to bid again for the 2024 Summer Olympics, but ultimately did not do so. Tokyo was ultimately elected as the host city of the 2020 Summer Olympics at the 125th IOC Session in Buenos Aires, Argentina.

== Overview ==
=== Venues ===
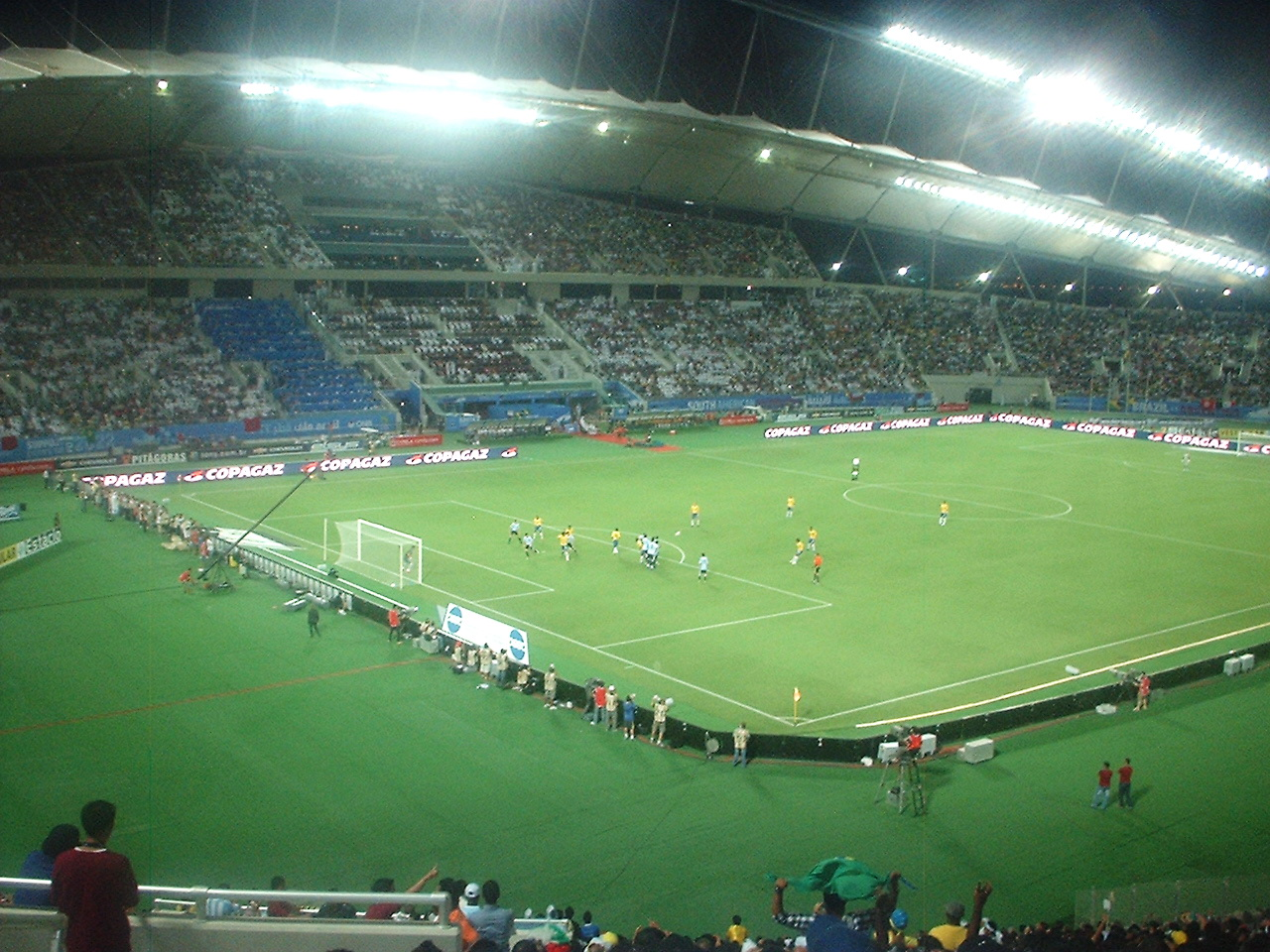
The Khalifa Stadium during a Football Game

Doha's bid consisted of five "Sports Zones". 91% of the needed venues were either already built or planned and had been budgeted for. This was part of the Qatar National Vision 2030. The opening and closing ceremonies would have taken place at the Lusail Iconic Stadium which is to be used for the 2022 FIFA World Cup. The Khalifa Stadium would host the Athletics competitions and its capacity would have been upgraded to 60,000 seats.

== See also ==
- Doha bid for the 2016 Summer Olympics
- Qatar at the Olympics
