= Los Angeles bid for the 2016 Summer Olympics =

Unsuccessful attempt to host Olympic Games

Bids for the 2016 Summer Olympics
Overview
- Games of the XXXI Olympiad
- Winner: Rio de Janeiro; Runner-up: Madrid; Shortlist: Chicago · Tokyo

Details
- City: Los Angeles, United States
- NOC: United States Olympic Committee (USOC)

Previous Games hosted
- 1932 Summer Olympics; 1984 Summer Olympics

Decision
- Result: Lost USOC bid to Chicago

The Los Angeles 2016 Olympic bid is a reference to the unsuccessful attempt by the city of Los Angeles, with help from the Greater Los Angeles area, to be chosen by the United States Olympic Committee as the official United States bid for the International Olympic Committee 2016 Summer Olympics host city competition. On July 26, 2006, the USOC had narrowed its list of candidates to Chicago, Los Angeles and San Francisco. San Francisco later withdrew its bid on November 13, 2006. On April 14, 2007, Chicago was selected as the United States bid. Two years later, Chicago lost their bid to Rio de Janeiro when the IOC voted to select the host city.

== Potential venues ==
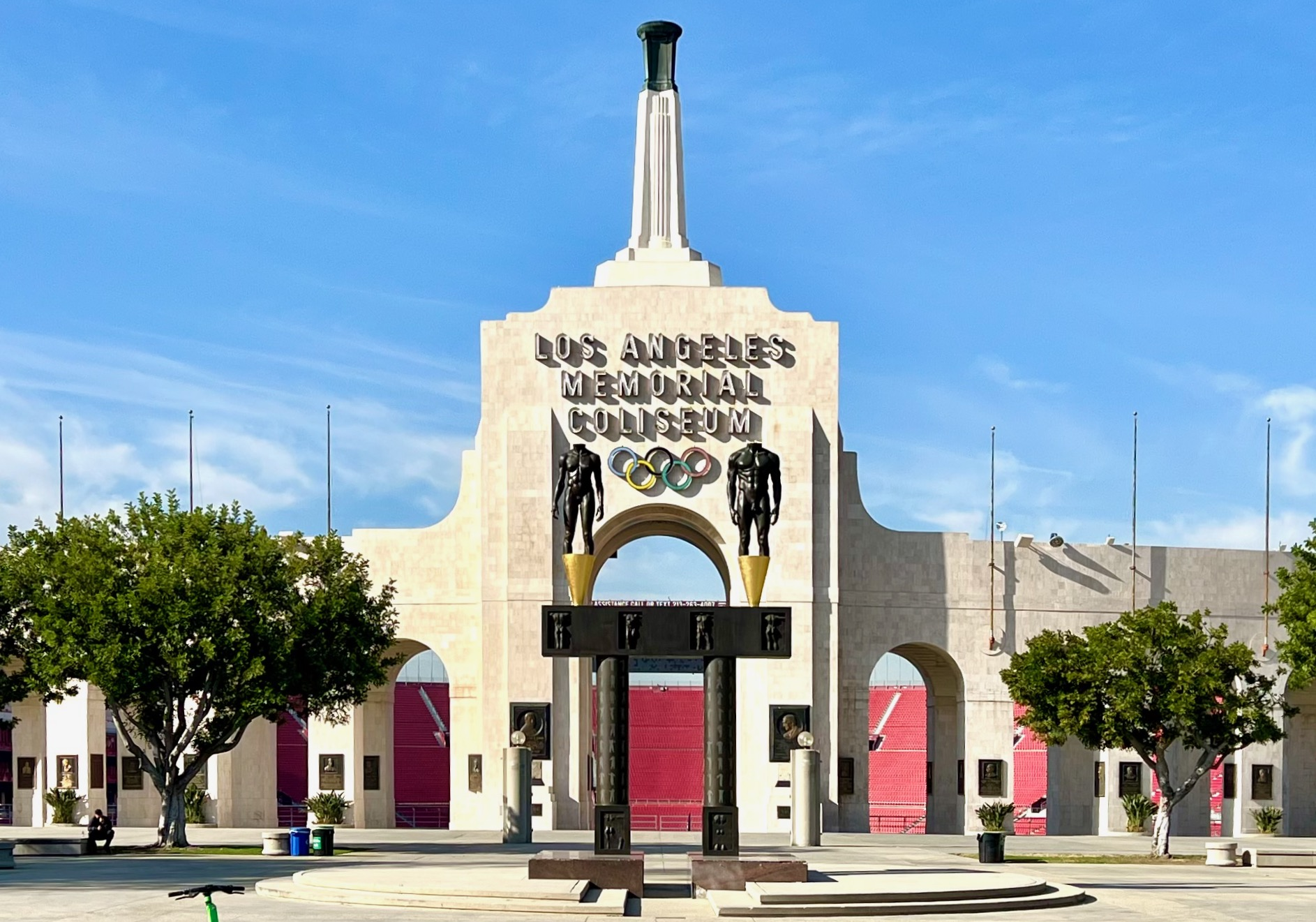
The Los Angeles Memorial Coliseum was proposed for hosting the ceremonies as well as Athletics.

The USOC's chairman, Peter Ueberroth, visited potential host cities in May 2006. Ueberroth and his party visited Los Angeles on May 18. Los Angeles has many existing sports venues, including many that were built in the years since the 1984 Summer Olympics, when Los Angeles last hosted. Existing venues currently include the following:

- Los Angeles Memorial Coliseum- Ceremonies and track competitions, 80 000
- Staples Center- Indoor venue and basketball competitions, 18 000
- Honda Center- Indoor venue and basketball venue 2, 16 000
- Los Angeles Memorial Sports Arena- Indoor venue and gymnastics/handball final, 16 000
- Long Beach Sports Arena- Indoor venue and handball preliminaries/quarterfinals, 10 000
- Walter Pyramid- Indoor venue and handball preliminaries 2, 5 000
- The Forum- Indoor venue and volleyball venue, 18 000
- The Home Depot Center- Soccer/Football events, 28 000
- Galen Center- Indoor venue on the USC campus and boxing, 10 000
- Pauley Pavilion- Indoor venue on the UCLA campus and volleyball preliminaries 2, 12 000
- Rose Bowl- Outdoor stadium, 90 000
- Angel Stadium- Outdoor venue and baseball preliminaries, 45 000
- Dodger Stadium- Outdoor venue and baseball final, 55 000
- San Pedro/Long Beach Harbor Area- Rowing, Canoe-sprint, 20 000
- Santa Anita Park- Equestrian events, 60 000
- Sam Boyd Stadium- Football Preliminaries in Las Vegas, 35 000
- University of Phoenix Stadium- Football Preliminaries in Glendale, Arizona, 60 000

== Infrastructure ==
Several hundred miles of commuter rail and rapid transit are present in Southern California, none of which existed in 1984. Many lines are still under construction, will reach several of the major sporting venues, and are planned to be completed in 2009, the same year the winning city was to be announced.

- Metrolink
- Los Angeles County Metropolitan Transportation Authority
  - Los Angeles Metro Rail
    - Metro Purple Line - may connect to a planned athletes village and the Pauley Pavilion at UCLA.
    - Metro Red Line - Downtown to Hollywood and the Valley tourist spots.
    - Metro Blue Line - connects to Staples Center and Home Depot Center.
    - Metro Green Line - connects near Los Angeles International Airport.
    - Metro Gold Line - connects to Rose Bowl, might connect to Santa Anita Park by 2013.
    - Metro Expo Line - connects to Galen Center, a Media Center/Family village at USC and the Los Angeles Memorial Coliseum.

== Sport culture ==
Los Angeles is the home of the following professional sports teams:

- Los Angeles Dodgers and * Los Angeles Angels of Anaheim Major League Baseball
- Los Angeles Kings of the NHL
- Los Angeles Lakers and Los Angeles Clippers of the NBA
- Los Angeles Sparks of the WNBA
- Los Angeles Galaxy and LAFC of Major League Soccer
- Los Angeles Rams of the National Football League
- Los Angeles Chargers of the National Football League

Prior to 1995, the Rams (1946–1994) and the Raiders (1982–1994) of the NFL were in the Los Angeles market. The Los Angeles Angels of Anaheim and Anaheim Ducks are both based in nearby Anaheim.

No reference to the sport culture of Los Angeles would be complete without mentioning the successful intercollegiate athletics programs at UCLA and the University of Southern California, both of which have produced many Olympic gold-medalists in nearly every Olympic sport.

Beach volleyball and windsurfing were both invented in the area (though predecessors of both were invented in some form by Duke Kahanamoku in Hawaii). Venice, also known as Dogtown, is credited with being the birthplace of skateboarding and the place where rollerblading first became popular. Area beaches are popular with surfers, who have created their own subculture.

Los Angeles has twice played host to the summer Olympic Games: in 1932 and in 1984, both of which were profitable, the latter being the most profitable Olympics in history, with profits of over $200 million. When the tenth Olympic Games were hosted in 1932, the former 10th Street was renamed Olympic Blvd. The 1984 Summer Olympics inspired the creation of the Los Angeles Marathon, which has been celebrated every year in March since 1986. Super Bowls I and VII were also contested in the city as was the World Cup Final in 1994.

== Developments ==
On June 23, 2006, five United States candidates met in California to offer official presentations to the USOC Board of Directors. Chicago Tribune reported of the event on June 24, "USOC officials indicated they could whittle down the field of five contenders in as soon as three weeks." The article also stated, "Observers say it's likely to be a three-way horse race between.... San Francisco, Chicago and Olympic veteran Los Angeles." As predicted, the USOC on July 26, 2006, officially named San Francisco, Los Angeles and Chicago as the three US finalists for the 2016 Olympics, dropping Philadelphia and Houston. However, on November 13, 2006, San Francisco withdrew its bid from the national selection process, leaving Chicago and Los Angeles as the only contenders in the U.S. bid.

On January 9, the USOC announced that they will go forward in presenting an American bid to the international competition for the 2016 games. The next step was for the city of Los Angeles and Chicago to have a bid book ready for the committee by January 22 for review and a video stating why the USOC should pick their city to represent America for International competition, to have ready for their cities evaluation See Below. On April 14, the evaluation team presented its findings to the USOC board of directors, and Chicago was chosen as the submission to the International Olympic Committee.

=== USOC visit ===
The USOC toured Los Angeles for a two-day visit on March 1 and 2nd of 2007. They were greeted at the planned athletes village, UCLA, by the Southern California Committee for the Olympic Games, Antonio Villaraigosa, and six Olympic athletes supporting L.A.'s Bid. The USOC required the two bidding cities to produce a short video answering the question, "Why their city?" USOC officials were shown a video made by The Walt Disney Studios, that showcased various athletes, movie stars and famous Los Angeles landmarks. They later attended a dinner party hosted by the Mayor at the Getty Center overlooking the city. Various celebrities, business leaders, politicians and Olympic Athletes were in attendance. The following day, the committee took the USOC on the Metro Blue Line to Long Beach, showcasing the new 95 miles of existing, under-construction and planned light rail and subway lines of the Los Angeles Transit system. After the tour of Long Beach, they followed the Blue Line to the Staples Center for a tour of the arena and the Downtown area, where Olympic activities and festivities would take place.

=== Supporters ===
- 85-90% of residents support the city's bid to host the Games.
- Mayor Antonio Villaraigosa
- Anschutz Entertainment Group
- Alexi Lalas
- Pasadena Mayor Bill Bogaard
- Long Beach Mayor Bob Foster
- The City of Las Vegas - Soccer Preliminaries
- Mia Hamm
- California Legislature
- Phil Jackson
- Los Angeles Sports Organization (Lakers, Clippers, Galaxy, Kings, Dodgers, Angels, etc.)
- California Governor Arnold Schwarzenegger
- Oscar Winner Forest Whitaker
- Peter Vidmar
- Janet Evans
- Willie Banks
- Jonathan Beutler
- Rafer Johnson
- Barry Sanders, SCCOG Chairman
- The Walt Disney Company
- Jerry Bruckheimer
- Mark Spitz
- Serena Williams
- Venus Williams
- John Naber
- Arizona Cardinals - whose stadium (University of Phoenix Stadium) will be in use for soccer events
- Carl Lewis
- Wolfgang Puck
- Bruce Hendricks

== Benefits ==
If the 2016 Summer Olympics were to have been held in Los Angeles, the Games would have generated more than $7 billion in potential revenue and create nearly 70,000 jobs. It would have created 67,825 full-time jobs, many of them in the hospitality and transportation industry. Many of these jobs might well have remained after the games, officials said, although they didn't give a figure. Los Angeles is one of the four cities from the United States bidding for the 2024 Summer Olympics. 1 September 2015 Los Angeles has been chosen as the U.S. candidate to bid for the 2024 Summer Olympics.

Los Angeles was later selected to host the 2028 Summer Olympics and Paralympics.

== See also ==
- 1932 Summer Olympics
- 1984 Summer Olympics
- Los Angeles bid for the 2024 Summer Olympics
- Los Angeles bids for the Summer Olympics
