= Paris bid for the 1992 Summer Olympics =

Failed bid to host Games of the XXV Olympiad

Bids for the 1992 Summer Olympics and Paralympics
Overview
- Games of the XXV Olympiad; IX Paralympic Games
- Winner: Barcelona; Runner-up: Paris; Shortlist: Belgrade · Brisbane · Birmingham · Amsterdam

Details
- City: Paris, France
- Chair: Jacques Chirac
- NOC: French National Olympic and Sports Committee (CNOSF)

Previous Games hosted
- 1900 Summer Olympics; 1924 Summer Olympics

Decision
- Result: Second runner up (23 votes)

The bid by Paris for the 1992 Summer Olympics was unsuccessful, and it was first announced in 1982. This marked the city's first attempt to host the games again. If awarded, the year will also commemorate the 200th anniversary of the French First Republic and the 100th anniversary of the plans to revive the Olympic Games.

== Background ==
=== Plans for the bid as their first attempt ===
In 1964, the French Olympic Committee and the government expressed their intention for Paris to bid for the 1972 Summer Olympics, as Armand Massard, who was then the president of the committee and an IOC member, wrote a letter to IOC President Avery Brundage. However, the plan did not come to fruition, as Munich was ultimately chosen as the host city for the games.

=== The bidding for the games ===
On 28 November 1984, at Hôtel de Ville, Jacques Chirac (a man who would later become president years later), the Mayor of the Capital, announced Paris's official bid to host the 1992 Summer Olympic Games. This marked the conclusion of four long years of waiting and eight months of intense financial negotiations. However, with the press release issued by the Mayor of Paris, this marathon concluded in a sprint.

Less than three hours earlier, Roger Belin and Michel Astorg, the two representatives of the Olympics, representing the City and the State respectively, had signed a financial agreement. It was therefore anticipated that in the coming days, a very official meeting would take place between the Mayor of Paris and the President of the French Republic, François Mitterrand, or his Prime Minister, Laurent Fabius.

Two and a half years ago, the President of the Republic mentioned Paris's candidacy during a meeting at the Élysée Palace with the President of the International Olympic Committee (IOC), and it is now considered a certainty. Since that meeting, all interested parties have expressed their support in turn. The Head of State even presented this candidacy as nearly certain on 1 June 1984, during a speech at the Sorbonne to mark the ninetieth anniversary of the IOC's establishment. However, this was not confirmed until the conclusion of a financial protocol on Wednesday between negotiators from the State and the City.

In August 1985, despite the concerned smiles of journalists from Montreal, the president of the Paris Chamber of Commerce and Industry, Mr. Philippe Clément, stated that he believed the 1992 Olympic Games, if held in Paris, would be self-financing. The Paris Chamber of Commerce and Industry unites around 220,000 manufacturers, retailers, and service providers. Several member companies have already contributed the 10,000 francs necessary to join the support committee.

In April 1986, 190 days before the decisive vote that would designate Lausanne as the host city for the 1992 Olympic Games on 17 October 1986, Paris made a significant impression with the visit of the International Olympic Committee's Evaluation Commission, which concluded yesterday. For the French capital, which has now completed the cycle of three mandatory inspections by international sports organizations, the outcome is practically determined. It now remains to engage in more nuanced political actions directed at the IOC members who will be casting their votes. Regarding the dossier, all the decision-makers are now aware of its contents. One thing appears certain: Paris possesses a robust and comprehensive dossier, free of any weaknesses, which has successfully garnered the support of Messrs. Gunnar Ericsson (Sweden), Nikos Filarètos (Greece), and Mohamed Zerguini (Algeria).

Paris lost the bid to Barcelona to host the games in 1992, finishing as the second runner-up with only 23 votes.

== Schedule and venues ==
The planned schedule of the Games was between 1 and 16 August 1992. The Olympic village was located in the Bercy-Tolbiac district. One part was on the left bank, south of the aquatic centre, which is now the François-Mitterrand Library. The other part was on the right bank, adjacent to Bercy Park, which is now the ZAC de Bercy.

List of venues
| Sport | Site | Commune | Status |
|---|---|---|---|
| Athletics/Olympic stadium (optional) | Parc des sports | Vincennes | To be built |
| Athletics/Olympic stadium (optional) | Parc du Tremblay | Champigny-sur-Marne | To be built |
| Rowing / Canoeing | Base nautique | Vaires-sur-Marne | To be built |
| Badminton | Parc des expositions de City of light-Nord Villepinte | Villepinte | Existing |
| Basketball | Parc des expositions de City of light-Nord Villepinte | Villepinte | Existing |
| Boxing | Parc des expositions de la porte de Versailles | Paris | Existing |
| Track cycling | Vélodrome de la Croix de Berny | | To be renovated |
| Road cycling | The circuits were being studied | | |
| Equestrian | Champ-de-Mars (dressage) | Paris | Existing |
| Equestrian | Hippodrome de Longchamp (team show jumping) | Paris | Existing |
| Equestrian | Olympic Stadium (individual show jumping) | Vincennes or Champigny-sur-Marne | To be built |
| Equestrian | Hippodrome de Fontainebleau (complete competition) | Fontainebleau | Existing |
| Fencing | Grand Palais | Paris | Existing |
| Soccer | Parc des Princes (finals) | Paris | Existing |
| Soccer | Stade Félix Bollaert | Lens | Existing |
| Soccer | Stade de la Beaujoire | Nantes | Existing |
| Soccer | Stade Geoffroy-Guichard | Saint-Étienne | Existing |
| Soccer | Stade de la Meinau | Strasbourg | Existing |
| Soccer | Stade Vélodrome | Marseille | Existing |
| Soccer | Stade de Gerland | Lyon | Existing |
| Gymnastics | Palais Omnisport de Paris-Bercy (artistic) | Paris | Existing |
| Gymnastics | Centre des nouvelles industries et technologies (rhythmic) | La Défense | Existing |
| Handball | Parc des expositions de Paris-Nord Villepinte | Villepinte | Existing |
| Handball | Palais Omnisport de Paris-Bercy (finals) | Paris | Existing |
| Weightlifting | Palais des congrès | Paris | Existing |
| Field Hockey | Haras de Jardy | Marnes-la-Coquette / Vaucresson | Existing |
| Judo | Centre des nouvelles industries et technologies | La Défense | Existing |
| Wrestling | Stade Pierre-de-Coubertin | Paris | Existing |
| Swimming | Aquatic centre | Paris | To be built |
| Swimming | Piscine Georges-Vallerey (preliminary phase of water polo ) | Paris | Existing |
| Modern pentathlon | Forêt de Fontainebleau | | Existing |
| Tennis | Stade Roland-Garros | Paris | Existing |
| Table tennis | Halle Georges-Carpentier | Paris | Existing |
| Shooting | Centre de tir | Briis-sous-Forges | To be built |
| Archery | Parc du Tremblay | Tremblay | Existing |
| Sailing | Port | Hyères | Existing |
| Volleyball | Parc des expositions de Paris-Nord Villepinte | Villepinte | Existing |
| Volleyball | Palais Omnisport de Paris-Bercy (finales) | Paris | Existing |
Two venues for demonstration sports were also proposed.

== Outlook ==
Since their failure, France has also chosen to host the same year's Winter Games in Albertville. Paris would later go on to lose two more bids for 2008, which was held in Beijing, and 2012, which also took place in London, before being finally selected as the host of the 2024 Summer Olympics in 2017.

== See also ==
- Paris bid for the 2008 Summer Olympics
- Paris bid for the 2012 Summer Olympics
- Paris bid for the 2024 Summer Olympics
