= Los Angeles bid for the 2024 Summer Olympics =

Bids for the 2024 Summer Olympics and Paralympics
Overview
- Games of the XXXIII Olympiad; XVII Paralympic Games
- Winner: Paris

Details
- City: Los Angeles, California, United States
- Chair: Casey Wasserman
- NOC: United States Olympic Committee (USOC)

Previous Games hosted
- 1932 Summer Olympics; 1984 Summer Olympics; Bid for 1952, 1956, 1976 and 1980

Decision
- Result: Paris selected as host; Los Angeles awarded 2028 Summer Olympics and Paralympics

The American city of Los Angeles mounted an unsuccessful bid to host the 2024 Summer Olympics and 2024 Summer Paralympics, but was instead chosen to host in 2028. Following withdrawals by other bidding cities during the bidding process that led to just two candidate cities (Los Angeles and Paris), the International Olympic Committee (IOC) approved a process to award the 2024 and 2028 Summer Olympics at the same time, with Los Angeles understood to be preferred for 2028. After extended negotiations, Los Angeles agreed to bid for the 2028 Games if certain conditions were met. On July 31, 2017, the IOC announced Los Angeles as the sole candidate for the 2028 games, with US$1.8 billion of additional funding to support local sports and the Games program.

Los Angeles was chosen by the United States Olympic Committee (USOC) on August 28, 2015, after the Los Angeles City Council voted unanimously to back the bid. Los Angeles was the second city submitted by the USOC for the 2024 Summer Olympics. Boston was originally chosen to be the American bid but withdrew on July 27, 2015. Los Angeles also originally bid for the USOC's nomination in late 2014, when Boston was chosen over Los Angeles; Washington, D.C.; and San Francisco. This was the third United States summer bid since hosting the Centennial Olympic Games (1996) in Atlanta, previously losing in 2012 and 2016 to London and Rio de Janeiro, respectively.

Los Angeles previously hosted the 1932 Summer Olympics and the 1984 Summer Olympics, and will become the third city – after London and Paris in 2024 – to host the Summer Games three times. Los Angeles will become the first American city to host the Olympic games since the 2002 Winter Olympics in Salt Lake City. It will be the fifth time a US city has hosted the Summer Olympics.

== Bid history ==
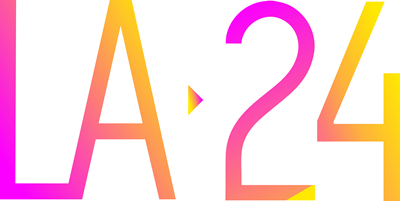
Initial campaign logo

In 2006, Los Angeles entered the bidding to become the US applicant city for the 2016 Summer Olympics; the United States Olympic Committee (USOC) selected Chicago instead. In September 2011, Los Angeles was awarded the 2015 Special Olympics World Summer Games. In March 2013, Mayor Antonio Villaraigosa sent a letter to the USOC stating that the city was interested in bidding to host the 2024 Olympic Games. On September 17, 2013, the LA County Board of Supervisors unanimously approved a resolution seeking interest in the Games.

On April 26, 2014, the Southern California Committee for the Olympic Games announced its bid proposal for the 2024 Olympics. On July 28, 2015, the USOC contacted Los Angeles about stepping in as a replacement bidder for the 2024 Summer Games after Boston dropped its bid. On September 1, 2015, the LA City Council voted 15–0 to support a bid for the 2024 Olympic Games. The U.S. Olympic Committee finalised its selection moments after the LA City Council's vote. On January 13, 2016, Los Angeles 2024 committee officials said they were "thrilled to welcome" the construction of a $2-billion-plus, state-of-the-art football stadium in Inglewood, California and believed the arrival of one—and perhaps two—NFL teams would bolster its chances. On January 25, 2016, the Los Angeles 2024 committee announced that it planned to place its Olympic Village on the UCLA campus. LA 2024 also announced that media members and some Olympic officials would be housed in a 15-acre residential complex USC planned to build.

On February 16, 2016, LA 2024 unveiled its new logo and slogan, "Follow the Sun." On February 23, 2016, more than 88% of Angelenos were in favor of the city's hosting the 2024 Olympic and Paralympic Games bid, according to a survey conducted by Loyola Marymount University. On March 10, 2016, Los Angeles officials bidding for the 2024 Summer Olympics turned their focus to temporary facilities that might be needed. Current plans include an elevated track built over the football field at the Los Angeles Memorial Coliseum and a proposal to temporarily convert Figueroa Street into a miles-long promenade for pedestrians and bicyclists.

On June 2, 2016, the IOC confirmed that Los Angeles would proceed to the second stage of bidding for the 2024 Summer Games. On July 29, 2016, LA 2024 officials released artist renderings of an updated Los Angeles Memorial Coliseum and temporary swim stadium, should Los Angeles be awarded the 2024 Summer Olympics.

On July 31, 2016, Mayor Eric Garcetti led a 25-person contingent from Los Angeles to Rio de Janeiro to promote their city's bid for the 2024 Summer Olympics. On September 7, 2016, LA 2024 planned to send a 16-person delegation to the 2016 Paralympics in Rio de Janeiro as part of its ongoing campaign to bring the Olympics back to Southern California.

On September 13, 2016, the LA 2024 bid committee released a two-minute video featuring a montage of local scenes narrated by children talking about their "dream city". On September 23, 2016, LA 2024 agreed to terms with the U.S. Olympic Committee on a required but controversial marketing arrangement. The Joint Marketing Program Agreement outlines shared responsibilities—and shared income—between Los Angeles and the USOC. On October 7, 2016, LA 2024 officials again made adjustments to their proposal for the 2024 Summer Olympics, moving half of a large and potentially expensive media center to the USC campus. On October 21, 2016, the LA 2024 bid committee again enlisted U.S. Olympians to help make the case for restoring the Summer Olympics to Los Angeles.

On November 9, 2016, LA 2024 issued a statement noting "LA 2024 congratulates President-elect Donald J. Trump and appreciates his longstanding support of the Olympic movement in the United States. We strongly believe the Olympics and LA 2024 transcend politics and can help unify our diverse communities and our world." On November 12, 2016, Mayor Eric Garcetti and six-time gold medalist sprinter Allyson Felix led an LA 2024 presentation to an array of Olympic leaders and sports officials at a general assembly for the Assn. of National Olympic Committees in Doha, Qatar. On 23 November 2016, President-elect Trump expressed his support for Los Angeles's 2024 Olympic bid during a phone call with Mayor Garcetti. On December 2, 2016, LA 2024 released a new budget estimating it would spend $5.3 billion to stage the Games.

On January 2, 2017, Angeleno Olympians and Paralympians rode on the Rose Parade float titled "Follow the Sun" to promote the city's bid. On 9 January 2017, LA 2024 issued a report predicting that the mega-sporting event would boost the local economy by $11.2 billion. On January 25, 2017, the Los Angeles City Council gave unanimous final approval for a privately run bid. On February 28, 2017, it was announced that four Hollywood film studios (Disney, Fox, NBCUniversal, and Warner Bros.) would be helping promote the Los Angeles bid. On April 20, 2017, the private committee - trying restore the Summer Olympics to Los Angeles - issued a new set of renderings and videos showing what the Games might look like.

Following the decision to award the 2024 and 2028 games simultaneously, Los Angeles announced that it would consider a bid for the 2028 Games if certain conditions were met. On July 31, 2017, the IOC announced Los Angeles as the sole candidate for the 2028 games, with $1.8 billion of additional funding to support local sport and the Games program. On August 29, 2018, Olympic officials arrived for a two-day visit that included meetings with local organizers and a tour of the city's newest venues. On April 17, 2019, LA2028 announced that it would partner with NBC Universal to sell media and sponsorship deals in tandem. On April 25, 2019, LA2028 expanded its staff.

=== Previous bids ===
Los Angeles has previously bid for the 1952, 1956, 1976, and 1980 games but lost to Helsinki, Melbourne, Montreal, and Moscow.

== Bid process ==
=== International Olympic Committee ===
2024 Olympic Bid Evaluation Commission:

- Patrick Baumann: Chair
- Marisol Casado: Member
- Mikaela Cojuangco Jaworski: Member
- Kirsty Coventry: Member
- Nawal El Moutawakel: Member
- Uğur Erdener: Member
- Habu Gumel: Member
- Poul-Erik Hoyer: Member
- Duane Kale: Member
- Gunilla Lindberg: Member
- Bernard Rajzman: Member
- Kereyn Smith: Member
- Tsunekazu Takeda: Member

== Budget ==
=== Revenues ===
Revenue description	OCOG revenue ($ million in 2024)	% of revenue
IOC contribution	$898.0	13.8%
Broadcast of TOP sponsorships	$437	7.3%
Domestic sponsorships	$2517.7	36.3%
Sports ticketing revenue	$1928.8	28.9%
Licensing and merchandise	$304.9	4.2%
Government contribution or grants	$11.6	0.2%
Lotteries and licensing royalties	$8.1	0.1%
Other revenues	$570.9	9.2%
Total revenues	$6,884.2	100%

At the time of the bid, UCLA, the University of Southern California (USC), NBC Universal, the Los Angeles Rams and the City of Los Angeles were modernizing or building infrastructure for future Olympic venues, totaling over $3 billion. Not listed as non-OCOG (Organizing Committee for Olympic Games).

The City of Los Angeles has guaranteed to sign the required Olympic City Charter and be the sole entity responsible for the Games and cost surplus or overruns. The city has pledged to contribute $250 million to cover any cost overruns. The State of California has created an Olympic Games Trust Fund that would pay for potential budget overruns up to $250 million. Both government guaranty payments would take place only if LA 2024's private insurance proves inadequate to cover cost overruns.

The theme and bid embodies the IOC Agenda 2020 reforms of Olympics, and a surplus of $161 million is predicted in Los Angeles. On January 9, 2017, the LA 2024 committee issued a report predicting that the Olympics would boost the local economy by $11.2 billion.

== Transportation and infrastructure ==
Los Angeles International Airport (widely known by its IATA code of LAX), the city's main airport, is investing more than US$1.9 billion into an expansion of the Tom Bradley International Terminal. The new Midfield Concourse Terminal is scheduled to add 11 gates for 2019, and many other improvements are planned with an expected completion date of 2023.

The Los Angeles Metro passed a county-wide measure expanding the county of Los Angeles' transportation tax for modernization of its infrastructure in 2008. This measure provides funding for many of the highest priority projects, including the Crenshaw/LAX Line connecting to LAX, Regional Connector light rail subway line corridor thru Downtown LA to Santa Monica and Long Beach, D Line Extension subway to UCLA, the Los Angeles Streetcar through downtown LA and five other transit lines and projects in the draft stages. The D Line and Crenshaw/LAX connectors are to be completed in time for 2024. The transportation plans are already fully funded by LA County voters. A second measure, Measure M, which passed in November 2016 elections, will extend the transportation tax funds indefinitely and speed many other projects with $120 billion in highway and transit projects over forty years, including a Sepulveda Subway line from the Valley to the Los Angeles westside thru the Sepulveda Pass.

LA 2024 bid leaders are touting these measures and infrastructure improvements as indicators of the new Los Angeles and a car-free Olympics in a city known for its car culture. 158.5 km (98 miles) of new rails, 93 stations and 350,000 daily average boardings. Los Angeles had no rail lines in 1984. Bid leaders indicate public rail transportation lines will be available to all of the clusters: Downtown Long Beach, San Fernando Valley Sports Park, Downtown L.A., and the Santa Monica beach cluster.

== LA 2024 Bid Committee ==
- Jerry Brown: Governor of California

=== Leadership ===
- Eric Garcetti: Mayor of Los Angeles
- Casey Wasserman: Chair, LA 2024
- Gene T. Sykes: Chief Executive Officer
- Maria Elena Durazo: Vice Chair
- Earvin "Magic" Johnson: Vice Chair
- Janet Evans: Vice Chair, Director, Athlete Relations
- Larry Probst: Chairman USOC
- Anita Defrantz: US IOC Member, Senior Advisor for Legacy
- Angela Ruggiero: US IOC Member
- Terrance Burns: Chief Marketing Officer
- John Harper: Chief Operations Officer
- Jeff Millman: Chief Communications Officer
- Brence Culp: Executive Director, Housing
- Carla Garcia: Director, Administrative Operations
- Brian Nelson: General Counsel
- Peter Tomozawa: Executive Director, Partnerships and Board Relations
- Tanja Olando: Deputy General Counsel
- Lenny Abbey: Director NOC/NPC Relations and Operations
- Jared Schott: Director of International Relations and Assistant General Counsel

In addition, the 2024 Bid Committee includes a 108-member athletes' advisory committee, which includes Andre Agassi, Allyson Felix, Michelle Kwan, Katie Ledecky, Greg Louganis, Carl Lewis, Apolo Ohno, Landon Donovan, Kobe Bryant and Michael Phelps.

== Opposition ==
NOlympics LA is a coalition of community organizations that opposes staging the 2028 Summer Olympics in Los Angeles. The group formed in 2017 in the Democratic Socialists of America and includes Black Lives Matter, LA Tenants Union, Sunrise Movement and others. The original members included Molly Lambert.

On May 12, 2021, NOlympics LA disrupted an International Olympic Committee (IOC) press conference in Tokyo, Japan. A representative of the group posing as journalist "David O'Brien from Yahoo" held a banner that read "No Olympics in Tokyo 2020" and chanted until the feed was cut. The video has since been deleted from the IOC's YouTube channel.

On July 19, 2022, NOlympics LA disrupted a press conference at the Los Angeles Memorial Coliseum in which Los Angeles mayor Eric Garcetti and IOC president Thomas Bach announced the official dates of the 2028 Summer Olympics. The protester shouted about tenants facing eviction near the coliseum and was removed by security, continuing to yell into the event from the fence outside.

Jules Boykoff's book NOlympians: Inside the Fight Against Capitalist Mega-Sports in Los Angeles, Tokyo and Beyond focuses on NOlympics LA's efforts, from the group's formation to its participation in an anti-Olympics summit in Tokyo, Japan, one year before the 2020 Summer Olympics were scheduled to take place. The book is based on more than 100 interviews with anti-Olympics activists, personal experiences, and archival research.

== Legacy of the Games ==
The Los Angeles Olympic bid committee has stated that its legacy will be delivering a sustainable model for the bidding process and delivery of a cost-effective Olympic Games. Los Angeles bid leaders are focusing on delivering an Olympic Games for the best athlete experience and not a centerpiece for a city revitalization project, as was recently the case for Sochi, Russia and Beijing, China. Bid leaders have indicated Los Angeles is transforming itself, does not need a city showcase, and has the ability to showcase the athletes instead.

The theme and bid embodies the IOC Agenda 2020 reforms of Olympics, and a surplus of $161 million is projected in Los Angeles. On January 9, 2017, the LA 2024 committee issued a report predicting that the Olympics would boost the local economy by $11.2 billion.

== Proposed venues ==
The 2024 Los Angeles Olympic bid uses existing venues, venues under construction and new temporary venues in and around the City of Los Angeles. Approximately half of the venues are outside the City of Los Angeles.

Many of the proposed venues are facilities constructed after the 1984 games: Staples Center in 1999, StubHub Center (since renamed Dignity Health Sports Park) in 2003, Galen Center in 2006, and Microsoft Theater in 2007. UCLA proposed the Olympic Village on their campus with dorms built in 2015. Rose Bowl was renovated in 2013. The Forum was recently renovated in 2014. USC "University Village" was officially opened in 2017. The "MyFigueroa" street redevelopment project is currently under construction. SoFi Stadium, a state-of-the-art convertible American football venue built for the Los Angeles Rams, opened in 2020 as the new home of both the Rams and Los Angeles Chargers. The Los Angeles Memorial Coliseum renovations were scheduled to begin in mid-2017 by USC. The Los Angeles Memorial Coliseum renovations began in mid-2017 by USC. The Los Angeles Convention Center (LACOEX) remodel and additions began in 2018. The NBC/IBC proposed center was completed in 2019. All of these proposed venues would have been renovated or completed with or without the Olympic Games being awarded.

=== Downtown Los Angeles Sports Park ===
Venue	Events	Capacity	Status
Figueroa Street	Live site: "Olympic Way"	N/A	Existing
Los Angeles Memorial Coliseum	Athletics	70,000	Existing
Los Angeles Memorial Coliseum	Closing Ceremonies	70,000	Existing
Dodger Stadium	Baseball and softball (preliminaries, finals)	56,000	Existing
Banc of California Stadium	Football (preliminaries)	22,000	Completed
Dedeaux Field (USC)	Swimming, diving, synchronized swimming	20,000	Existing
Galen Center (USC)	Badminton	10,300	Existing
Galen Center (USC)	Karate	10,300	Existing
Los Angeles Convention Center	Basketball (women's preliminaries)	8,000	Existing
Los Angeles Convention Center	Boxing	8,000	Existing
Los Angeles Convention Center	Fencing		Existing
Los Angeles Convention Center	Taekwondo	7,000	Existing
Los Angeles Convention Center	Table tennis	5,000	Existing
Los Angeles Convention Center	BMX freestyle		Existing
Staples Center	Basketball (preliminaries, finals)	18,000	Existing
Microsoft Theater	Weightlifting	7,000	Existing
University Village (USC)	Media Village	N/A	Existing
City Hall	Marathon	5,000	Existing
City Hall	Race walk	5,000	Existing
City Hall	Road cycling	5,000	Existing

=== Valley Sports Park ===
Venue	Events	Capacity	Status
Sepulveda Basin Park, Los Angeles, CA	Canoe slalom	8,000	Planned construction
Sepulveda Basin Park, Los Angeles, CA	Equestrian	15,000	Temporary structure
Sepulveda Basin Park, Los Angeles, CA	Shooting	3,000	Temporary structure

=== South Bay Sports Park ===
Venue	Events	Capacity	Status
StubHub Center, Carson, CA	Rugby	30,000	Existing
StubHub Center, Carson, CA	Modern pentathlon	30,000	Existing
StubHub Center, Carson, CA	Tennis	10,000 (center court)	Existing
StubHub Center, Carson, CA	Field hockey	15,000 (primary field; secondary field 5,000)	Existing
VELO Sports Center, Carson, CA	Track cycling	6,000	Existing
VELO Sports Center, Carson, CA	Modern pentathlon fencing	6,000	Existing

=== Long Beach Sports Park ===
Venue	Events	Capacity	Status
Long Beach Waterfront, Long Beach, CA	BMX cycling	6,000	Temporary
Long Beach Waterfront, Long Beach, CA	Water polo	8,000	Existing
Long Beach Waterfront, Long Beach, CA	Triathlon	2,000	Existing
Long Beach Waterfront, Long Beach, CA	Open water swimming	2,000	Existing
Long Beach Arena, Long Beach, CA	Handball	12,000	Existing
Long Beach Convention Center, Long Beach, CA	Sports climbing	10,000	Existing
Belmont Veterans Memorial Pier, Long Beach, CA	Sailing	6,000	Existing

=== Other Venues ===
Venue	Events	Capacity	Status
Rose Bowl, Pasadena, CA	Football	92,000	Existing
Angel Stadium, Anaheim, CA	Baseball and softball	45,457	Existing
Lake Perris, Moreno Valley, CA / Perris, CA	Canoe sprint	12,000	Existing
Lake Perris, Moreno Valley, CA / Perris, CA	Rowing	12,000	Existing
Frank G. Bonelli Regional Park, San Dimas, CA	Mountain biking	3,000	Temporary
Honda Center, Anaheim, CA	Indoor volleyball	18,000	Existing
Universal Studios, Hollywood, CA	International Broadcast Center/MPC		Existing
Los Angeles Westside Area
Santa Monica State Beach, Santa Monica, CA	Beach volleyball	12,000	Temporary
Santa Monica State Beach, Santa Monica, CA	Skateboarding	10,000	Existing
Santa Monica State Beach, Santa Monica, CA	Surfing	8,000	Existing
Santa Monica State Beach, Santa Monica, CA	3×3 Basketball		Existing
Riviera Country Club, Los Angeles, CA	Golf	30,000	Existing
Pauley Pavilion (UCLA), Westwood, CA	Olympic Village, Olympic Village Training Center		Existing
Pauley Pavilion (UCLA), Westwood, CA	Wrestling	12,500	Existing
Pauley Pavilion (UCLA), Westwood, CA	Judo	12,500	Existing
LA Stadium at Hollywood Park, Inglewood, CA	Opening and closing ceremonies	100,000	Completed in 2020
LA Stadium at Hollywood Park, Inglewood, CA	Football	100,000	Completed in 2020
LA Stadium at Hollywood Park, Inglewood, CA	Archery	8,000 (Stadium Lake)	Under construction
The Forum, Inglewood, CA	Gymnastics	17,000	Existing

==== Olympic ceremonies ====
Olympic ceremonies could be held in two venues simultaneously; the ceremony would begin at the Los Angeles Memorial Coliseum in Exposition Park to honor the legacy of the Olympics in Los Angeles and then transfer to the new SoFi Stadium in Inglewood to proceed with the parade of athletes, oaths, traditional Olympic protocol and the lighting of a cauldron. LA 2024 bid leaders wish to use the new LA stadium to dispel negative thought about using the LA Memorial Coliseum for a third Olympics. They also cite ticket sales at both sites as extra cash flow for the committee. Additionally, the LA 2024 team stated they would reverse the closing ceremony with a start at LA Stadium and close the show at the LA Coliseum if chosen.

== Soccer stadiums ==
Soccer venues will be situated within Los Angeles and in other parts of California, to be determined.

Potential venues:

- Rose Bowl, Pasadena (92,542 capacity) – 3 group matches, quarterfinals, semifinals and women's final
- SoFi Stadium, Inglewood (80,000) – 3 group matches, quarterfinals, semifinals and men's final
- Levi's Stadium, Santa Clara, California (68,500) – 5 group matches, quarterfinals, and men's bronze medal match
- California Memorial Stadium, Berkeley, California (63,000) - 8 group matches
- Stanford Stadium, Stanford (50,000) – 5 group matches, quarterfinals and women's bronze medal match
- New MLS Stadium, San Diego (32,000) – 8 group matches
- Banc of California Stadium, Exposition Park (22,000) – 8 group matches
- Avaya Stadium, San Jose (20,000) – 8 group matches

=== Changed venues ===
Piggyback Yard, a rail yard along the LA River, was the original proposed location for the Olympic Village. It would have been an entirely new residential development that would be permanent housing after the games. Due new rules applied during the process, this idea was abandoned and UCLA was chosen as the new proposed location.

== See also ==
- 1932 Summer Olympics
- 1984 Summer Olympics
- Los Angeles bid for the 2016 Summer Olympics
- Los Angeles bids for the Summer Olympics
