= Birmingham bid for the 1992 Summer Olympics =

Bids for the 1992 Summer Olympics and Paralympics
Overview
- Games of the XXV Olympiad; IX Paralympic Games
- Winner: Barcelona; Runner-up: Paris; Shortlist: Brisbane · Belgrade · Amsterdam

Details
- City: Birmingham, United Kingdom
- Chair: Denis Howell
- NOC: British Olympic Association

Evaluation
- IOC score: 8 votes

Previous Games hosted
- None

Decision
- Result: 4th runner up

The Birmingham bid for the 1992 Summer Olympics and Paralympics was an unsuccessful campaign, first recognised by the International Olympic Committee (IOC) on 28 February 1986. Ultimately it lost, having only gained eight votes with Barcelona going on to host the 1992 Summer Olympics. Its failure was due to a number of factors, including a perceived lack of support by the British Government for the bid as well as the international relations that the UK had at the time with South Africa and the United States.

== Bid details ==
Birmingham was selected as the city for the UK bid ahead of London and Manchester. The city had long been described as Britain's "second city". It was led by Denis Howell, former Minister for Sport of the United Kingdom. Howell was a member of the Labour Party, which at the time was in opposition and therefore was not a member of the sitting government of the United Kingdom.

Birmingham's bid was previewed at the Sports Council seminar in Harrogate on 26 February 1986 prior to being submitted to the IOC on 28 February. Howell had returned from touring Eastern European countries to promote the bid in order to conduct discussions with IOC president Juan Antonio Samaranch.

=== Financing ===
An initial estimate of £500 million was given for hosting the games, with the bid team expecting the city to make a profit of around £200 million on that. The bidding process itself cost upwards of £10 million.

=== Venues ===
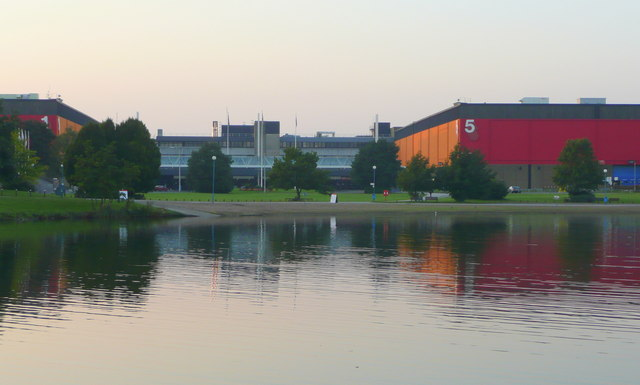
The venues for Birmingham's bid were centred around the National Exhibition Centre (pictured)

The main venues for the Birmingham bid were centred on the National Exhibition Centre (NEC), and attempted to highlight the ease of access between the venues and the proposed athlete's village and other transport links. The NEC had seven indoor arenas, and it was expected that 85% of the sporting events would be hosted within 5 miles (8.0 km). The shooting would have been hosted at the Aldersley Stadium, Wolverhampton, where an £8 million complex was to have been built under the bid proposal.

Olympic Stadium - opening/closing ceremonies, athletics

Olympic Sports Halls - badminton, boxing, fencing, gymnastics, handball, judo, table tennis, volleyball, weightlifting, wrestling, modern pentathlon (fencing)

Birmingham Velodrome - cycling

Edgbaston Priory - tennis

Birmingham Leisure Pool - swimming, diving, water polo, synchronised swimming, modern pentathlon (swimming)

Stoneleigh Park - equestrian, archery, modern pentathlon (running, riding)

Perry Park - basketball, hockey

National Shooting Centre - shooting

National Water Sports Centre - canoeing, rowing

National Yachting Centre - yachting

Villa Park - football

St. Andrew's Stadium - football

The Hawthorns - football

Highfield Road - football

=== Olympic village ===
It was anticipated that a new Olympic village would be constructed as opposed to using existing buildings in order to facilitate security precautions being built into the new properties.

A secondary Olympic village at Weymouth was planned for the competitors in the sailing events. The Pontins holiday camp near Weymouth was identified as a likely location following a study conducted by the Royal Yachting Association in 1985.

=== Bid factors ===
Birmingham began to host international sporting events in order to boost its profile as a potential city for the 1992 Olympics. These included an inner city Formula 3000 road race at a cost of £1.5 million.

Support by the British Government for the bid was seen as lacking, with a letter of support signed by Kenneth Baker the Secretary of State for the Environment instead of Prime Minister Margaret Thatcher. The question of the Government support was brought up in discussion in the House of Lords, with Lord Skelmersdale stating, "My Lords, it is the responsibility of Birmingham City Council to make and promote its own bid. In doing so, the city has sought Government support to enable it to meet the requirements of the Olympic Charter and to help Birmingham secure the nomination to host the Games. The Government are giving that support." Shortly prior to the IOC vote there was a boycott by 21 countries of the 1986 Commonwealth Games in protest against Thatcher's ongoing support of maintaining sporting links with South Africa. In addition the United Kingdom had supported the United States in their bombing raid on Libya, which was seen as immediately eliminating any Middle Eastern support for a UK bid. The Handsworth riots were also seen to have had a detrimental effect on Birmingham's bid for the Olympics.

== Outlook ==
The British press had presented Barcelona's bid as falling out of favour with the IOC due to the locating of the Olympic stadium on top of a hill which would have presented problems with the ending stages of the marathon. However Barcelona went on to win the bid process, with Birmingham being the second city to be eliminated after Amsterdam.

Further bids were put forward for the 1996 and 2000 Games from Manchester, but these too failed to win. During the initial stages of putting together the bid for the 2012 Summer Olympics, the British bid team did look at putting forward Birmingham once more. However, the IOC told the bid team that the only way that Britain could host the games was if the bid came from London instead.

Birmingham eventually hosted the 2022 Commonwealth Games.
