= Around the Rings =

American publication

- Available in: English
- Headquarters: Atlanta, Georgia, {{{location_country}}}
- Founder: Ed Hula
- Website: www.aroundtherings.com
- Launched: May 1992; 34 years ago

Around the Rings (ATR) is an Internet-based publication covering the business and politics of the Olympic Movement, as well as a wide array of issues in international sports. ATR delivers its news across several platforms: print, online, email, and mobile app.

== Location ==
The company's global headquarters are in Atlanta, Georgia, with contributors and sales staff based around the world.

== History ==
ATR had its beginnings in the late 1980s, when Atlanta was bidding for the 1996 Olympic Games. The company – originally known as Radio Atlanta – was founded in May 1992 by Ed Hula. Between 1994 and 1996, Hula was the Olympics correspondent for WGST, the official “information station” for the Atlanta Games. He also served as AOL’s Olympics reporter in Atlanta.

Whilst delivering his radio coverage to listeners worldwide, Hula realized there was a demand for specialized business news about the Olympics. As a result, he wrote a column for a weekly political newsletter that was mailed out across the Southeast. "The Hula Report", as it was known, soon outgrew its one-page allotment and became a four-to-eight page fax distributed twice monthly. As "The Hula Report" expanded into a 12-to-16 page publication, it was transferred into email format. Advances in technology enabled ATR to launch its own website.

The Nagano Olympics in 1998 saw Ed Hula became the first New Media journalist accredited for the Games.

The Sydney Olympic Games became a watershed moment for ATR. From 1998 to 2001, Hula was based in Sydney as the Olympics editor for 2UE, the rights-holding radio station for the Sydney games. As well as opening an office there, ATR witnessed a significant growth in their readership.

Over the years, ATR has become the “go-to" source for Olympic bid information, and is frequently quoted across international media. A subscription to the site is required in order to access premium content, although many articles are freely available to all visitors. Hula has provided coverage about every Olympic Games since Barcelona.

== Events ==
During that time, Around the Rings developed an events arm with its Newsmaker Breakfast series. These networking events provide the opportunity for journalists, sports marketers and others with an interest in the Games to meet and talk in an informal setting.

Guests have included Jacques Rogge, then president of the European Olympic Committees, Gianna Angelopoulos-Daskalaki of Athens 2004, Prince Albert of Monaco, U. S. Olympic Committee presidents, Dmitry Chernyshenko of Sochi 2014, athletics great Sergey Bubka, NBC Olympics chief Dick Ebersol and many other well-known figures in the Olympic Movement.

Newsmaker Breakfasts have become an international event, having been hosted in Acapulco, Atlanta, Beijing, Chicago, Copenhagen, London, New York, Salt Lake City, Sydney, and Vancouver.

In 2012, the website celebrated its 20th anniversary cementing its claim "20 years at #1."

== Expansion to football ==
In June 2009 Around the Rings created a second internet publication, World Football Insider (WFI). The company launched Insider after realizing the need for a reputable publication about the business of international football. Insider is the first online publication to focus on the business of football. Since its inception, correspondents have reported from Zurich, South Africa, Kuala Lumpur, Moscow, Rio de Janeiro, Nassau and many other locations to provide on-the scene reporting of major football events. It is a primary source of news about preparations for the FIFA World Cup and delivers information about FIFA, its 208 member associations, the business of the six continental confederations, as well as the sponsors of the Beautiful Game.

== Publications ==
ATR publishes high-impact magazines for major events on the Olympic calendar. These magazines are distributed at the events, typically at the conference site and in hotels and press centers.

ATR Daily Editions: The Daily Editions, published during the Olympic Games, target high level visitors and media with information directed at those in the host city. The issues are distributed in the Olympic City at locations such as the Main Press Center, the International Broadcast Center, official hotels, business centers, non-accredited media centers and more.

The Ultimate Insider's Guide: This is a pocket-sized compilation of names, contact information, facts, figures and fun designed for high level Games-time visitors and media in the Olympic city. It is also available free of charge online.

ATR SportAccord Special Edition: The magazine targets attendees of the SportAccord Convention, the marquee annual conference for the international sports federations. Around the Rings is one of three original media partners since 2005.

ATR Golden 25: The Around the Rings Golden 25 is a ranking of the personalities who will have the greatest influence in the Olympics in the coming year. It is one of the most coveted nominations in world sport. The countdown begins mid-December and ends around January 1. The 2011 edition was the 15th anniversary of the Golden 25.

ATR Special Editions for IOC Sessions: ATR has published a special edition magazine for every IOC session since July 2001.

== Online ==
Around The Rings Website: Most ATR news is disseminated via its website. Four to five articles are published to the website every day. ATR eBulletins alert readers each time an article is published to the website. Featured content includes coverage of Bidding for the Games, Sochi 2014, Rio 2016, PyeongChang 2018, Tokyo 2020 the International Federations, ATR weekly newsletter, Op Ed column, ATR Datebook, photo galleries, Golden Opportunities, online special editions, and more.

Blog: The ATR blog on Wordpress provides a forum for more in depth discussion among readers and fans. The “Op Ed” column is frequently posted and a link to the company's Twitter page is posted to encourage discussion.

== Correspondents, contributors, and staff ==
- Ed Hula, Editor and Founder
- Sheila Scott Hula, Publisher
- Eric Moran, Vice President of Sales
- Janice McDonald, Special Projects
- Kathy Kuczka, Circulation Director
- Brian Baker, Partnership Development

Editorial Staff

- Gerard Farek, Assignment Editor
- Aaron Bauer, Writer

Correspondents

- Mark Bisson, European Editor
- Karen Rosen, Americas Editor
- Bob Mackin, Canada
- Christian Radnedge, London
- Heinz Peter Kreuzer, Germany
- Brian Pinelli, Europe
