= Ed Hula =

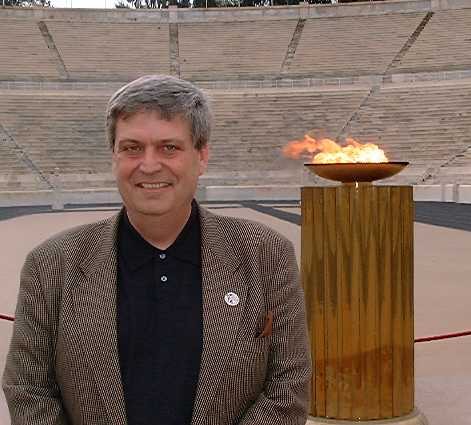
- Born: July 17, 1951 (age 75); Tarrytown, New York
- Occupation: Writer
- Website: aroundtherings.com

Ed Hula (born June 17, 1951 in Tarrytown, New York) is the editor and founder of Around the Rings (ATR), a leading publication specializing in business news about the Olympics. Prior to launching Around the Rings, Hula worked as a journalist and producer for major radio and TV broadcasters such as CNN. He holds a B.A. from Florida State University in government.

Hula is married to Sheila Scott Hula, the publisher of Around the Rings. They have one son.

== Career ==
Hula began covering the Olympics in the late 1980s when Atlanta began its bid for the 1996 Olympics. Hula and his team have covered every Olympics since 1992, as well as major championships in Olympic sports, meetings of the IOC and other key events involving the business of the Games. He is frequently sought out by international media for his views on issues affecting the Olympics, and is recognized as one of the foremost authorities on the Olympic bid process. His Olympic bid Power Index – a ranking of cities bidding for the Olympics is produced outside the IOC based on expert analysis and first-hand contact with the bid cities.

Hula also hosts the Around the Rings Newsmaker Breakfasts, which are considered to be among the top networking events on the Olympic calendar. Begun as informal get-togethers during the Centennial Olympic Games as an opportunity for journalists and newsmakers to chat, the breakfasts have become international events. They have been held in Acapulco, Beijing, Chicago, Copenhagen, London, Salt Lake City, Sydney and Vancouver.

Hula has covered the Games for radio, television, print and internet. He was Olympics editor for rights-holder Radio 2UE in Sydney for the Games of 2000. Hula also was a correspondent for rights-holder KSL radio and television in Salt Lake City for the 2002 Winter Olympics.

Hula was in the vanguard of new media, serving as AOL's correspondent for the 1996 Games in Atlanta. In 1998, Around the Rings, then published by fax and on-line, was the first digital publication to be credentialed for the Olympics.

In June 2009, Hula and his team launched World Football Insider, an online publication covering the business of international football. Mark Bisson was appointed editor and James Corbett as a correspondent.

He has won numerous awards for his news coverage from the Associated Press, Society for Professional Journalists and the Overseas Press Club.
