= Madrid bid for the 2020 Summer Olympics =

Entry by the Spanish city in the competition to host the sporting festival

Bids for the 2020 Summer Olympics and Paralympics
Overview
- Games of the XXXII Olympiad; XVI Paralympic Games
- Winner: Tokyo; Runner-up: Istanbul; Shortlist: Madrid

Details
- City: Madrid, Spain
- Chair: Alejandro Blanco
- NOC: Spanish Olympic Committee (COE)

Previous Games hosted
- None • Bid for 1972, 2012 and 2016

Decision
- Result: 2nd runner-up (26 votes)

Madrid 2020 was a bid for the 2020 Summer Olympics by the city of Madrid and the Spanish Olympic Committee.

== History ==
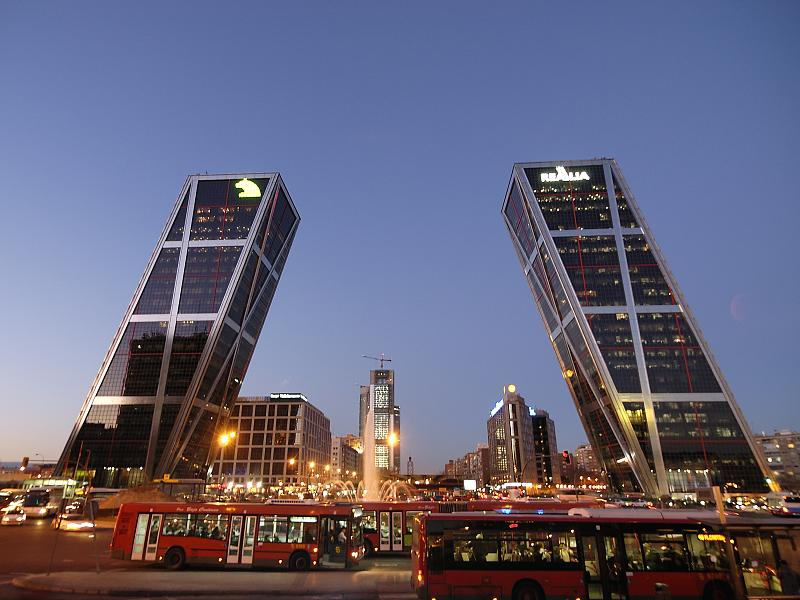
The Puerta de Europa buildings at Plaza de Castilla

=== Applicant City phase ===
The only time that the Olympic Games were hosted in Spain was in 1992 when Barcelona hosted the XXV Olympiad. This was the only time the Olympic Games were staged in Spain. Madrid was nominated by the Spanish Olympic Committee on June 1, 2011. It was then approved by the government a month later.

On September 8, 2011 it was announced that Alejandro Blanco, president of the Spanish Olympic Committee, would preside the Madrid 2020 bid. Shortly after his appointment he defended Madrid's ability to host the games despite Spain's current economic problems arguing that the games would be an investment. The following week IOC President Jacques Rogge defended Madrid and Rome's ability to host the games given the current eurozone debt crisis. He said that both cities already have a lot of venues in place and that not much would need to be built. He continued by saying that at the very most some venues would need upgrades and that both cities had the infrastructure needed to host the games. The bid's budget will be between $30.2 million and $35.3 million. In December 2011, Madrid's new mayor, Ana Botella confirmed her support for the bid.

In January 2012, the bid received the support of the Spanish Committee of Representatives of Persons with Disabilities.

Madrid 2020 revealed their logo and website on January 30, 2012. A survey carried out between December 2011 and January 2012 found that 84% of Spanish citizens supported the Madrid bid to host the Olympic Games in 2020. 90% of those surveyed believe that hosting the games will be positive because it will help to employ people. 75% of Madrid residents supported the Olympic bid.

=== Candidate City phase ===
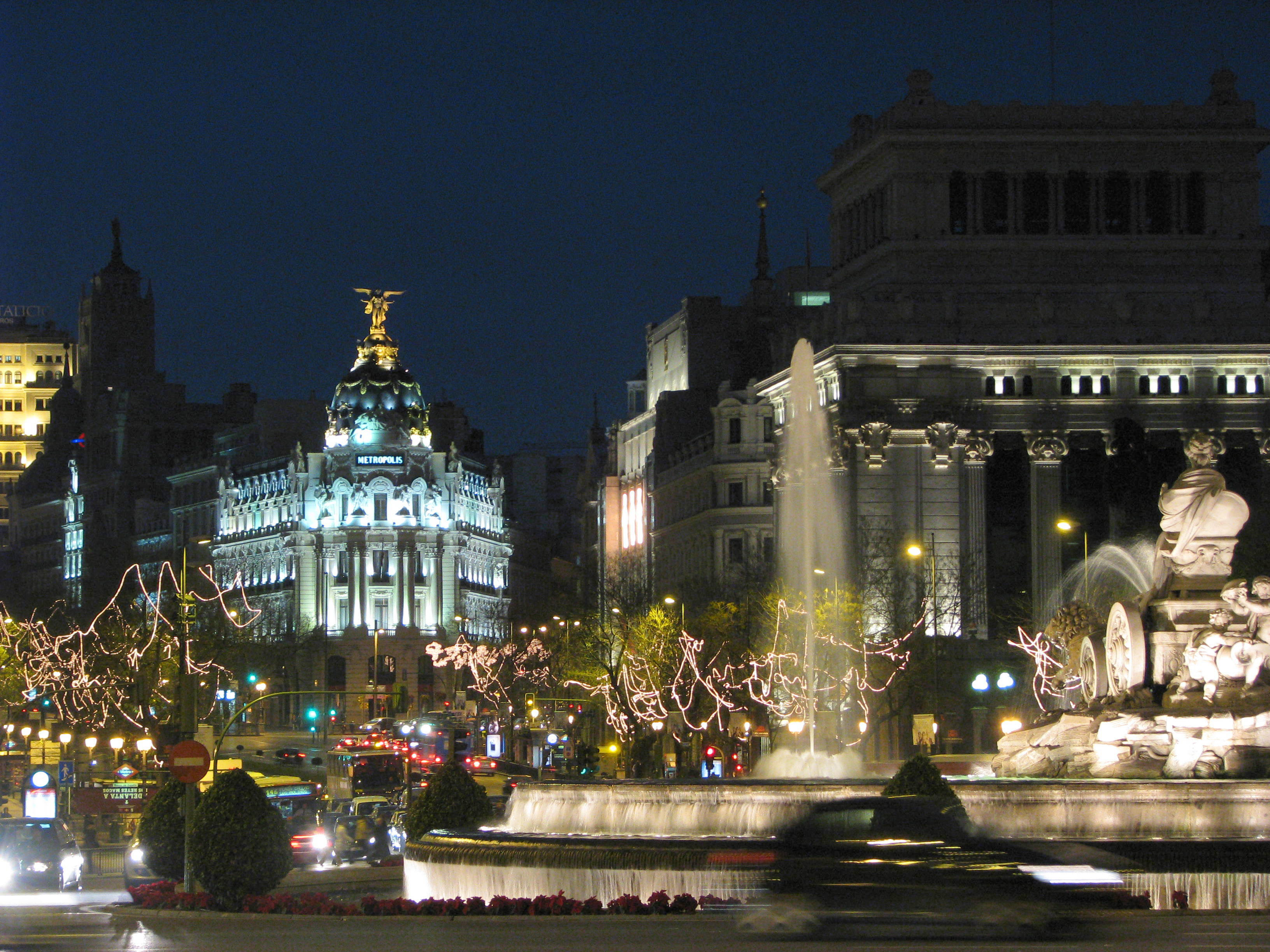
Plaza de Cibeles at night

On May 23, 2012, the IOC selected Madrid as a Candidate City for the 2020 Summer Olympics.

In July 2012, Madrid's bid secured the support of over one hundred companies. Madrid 2020 submitted their candidature file to the IOC on January 7, 2013. They later presented their candidature file to the International Paralympic Committee on February 1, 2013.

The IOC Evaluation Commission visited Madrid from March 18 to March 21, 2013.

At the Extraordinary General Assembly of the Association of National Olympic Committees, in June 2013, Madrid 2020 stated that hosting the games would boost the Spanish economy, which is expected to start recovering by the last quarter of 2013, and was predicted to grow over the following five years.

The 2020 IOC Evaluation Commission Report on the Candidate Cities for the 2020 Summer Olympics was released on June 25.

Madrid 2020 gave a presentation of their bid to the IOC at an Extraordinary session in Lausanne in July 2013.

In July 2013, the bid launched their "Illuminate the Future" slogan.

==== 125th IOC Session ====
Prior to the host city election, FC Barcelona's Lionel Messi pledged his support for Madrid's bid for the 2020 Summer Olympics.

At the 125th IOC Session in Buenos Aires, Argentina Madrid was eliminated from the election following a tie with Istanbul. Madrid was eliminated in the tie-breaking vote. Tokyo was ultimately elected as the host city.

2020 Summer Olympics host city election
City	Team	Round 1	Runoff	Round 2
Tokyo	Japan	42	—	60
Istanbul	Turkey	26	49	36
Madrid	Spain	26	45	—

=== Outlook, Conclusion and Future ===
Madrid's bid was considered to be hurt by Spain's weak economy as well as the Operación Puerto doping case. Following Madrid's failure to secure the 2020 Olympics, it was confirmed that Madrid would not be bidding for the 2024 Summer Olympics.

Barcelona had expressed interest in bidding for the 2022 Winter Olympics, but did not bid, instead expressing an interest to submit a bid for the 2026 Winter Olympics, which did not come to fruition either.

On 17 June 2019, the newly elected Mayor of Madrid José Luis Martínez-Almeida announced that they would explore a bid for the 2032 Summer Olympics, but games were given for Brisbane in Australia and it's unclear what the situation is for 2036 Summer Olympics.

== Previous bids ==
Madrid bid for the 1972 Summer Olympics and lost to Munich. They bid for the 2012 Olympics and lost in the third round of voting. London went on to defeat Paris in the final round. Madrid's most recent bid was for the 2016 Olympics, which they lost to Rio de Janeiro in the final round of voting.

Madrid's 2020 bid was their third consecutive bid for the games and fourth overall bid. The Games have been held in Spain on just one previous occasion, the 1992 Summer Olympics in Barcelona.

=== Previous bids from other Spanish cities ===
Aside from Barcelona's successful 1992 bid, Barcelona bid for the 1924 Summer Olympics but lost to Paris. They later made a bid for the 1936 Games but lost to Berlin.

Seville bid for the 2004 Summer Olympics as well as the 2008 Games but they lost to Athens and Beijing respectively.

Jaca made four bids for the Winter Olympics. They first bid for the 1998 Olympics but lost to Nagano. They then bid for the Winter Olympics in 2002, 2010 and 2014 but failed to become a candidate for those three games. Those Winter Games were awarded to Salt Lake City, Vancouver and Sochi respectively.

== Venues ==
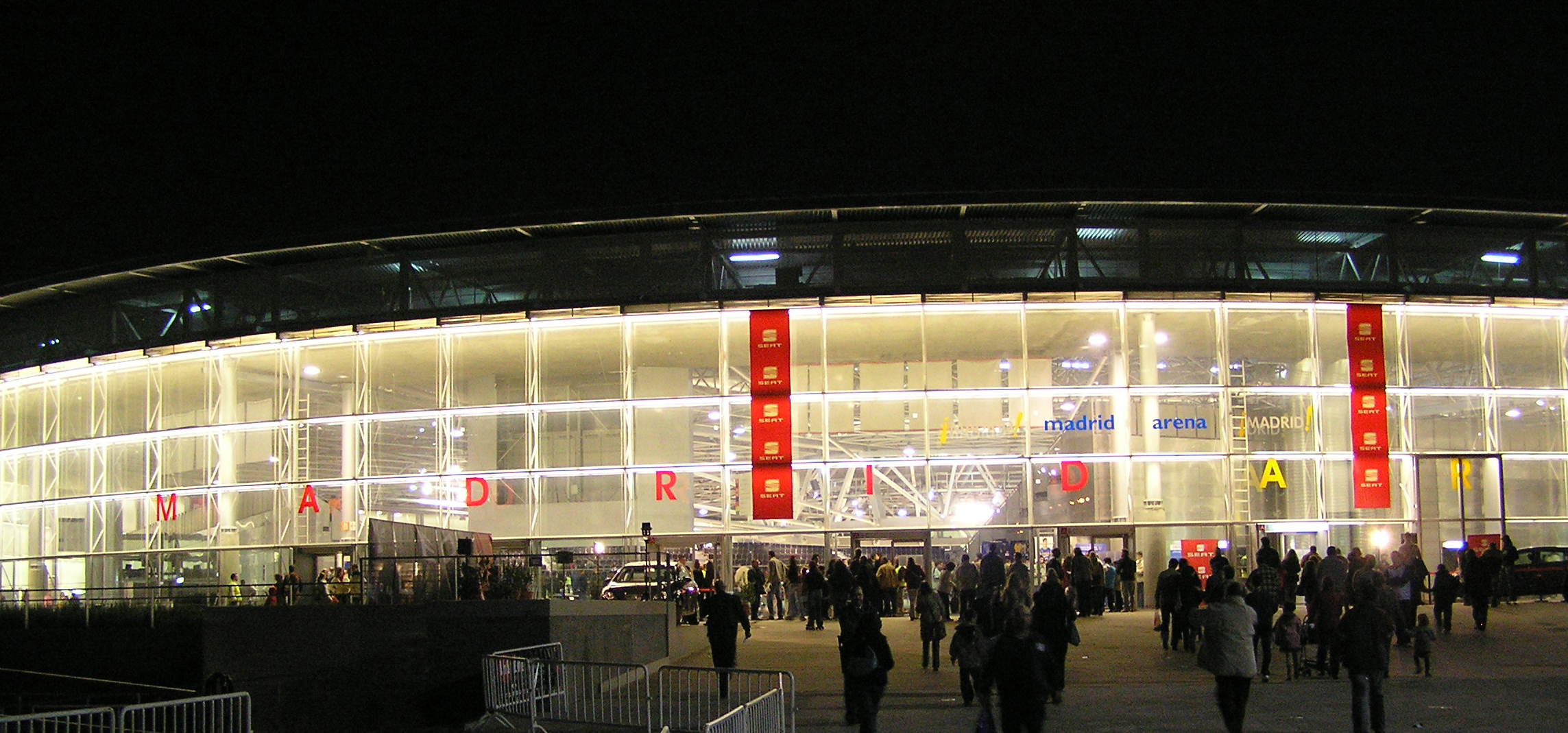
The Madrid Arena, proposed venue for the Handball competitions.

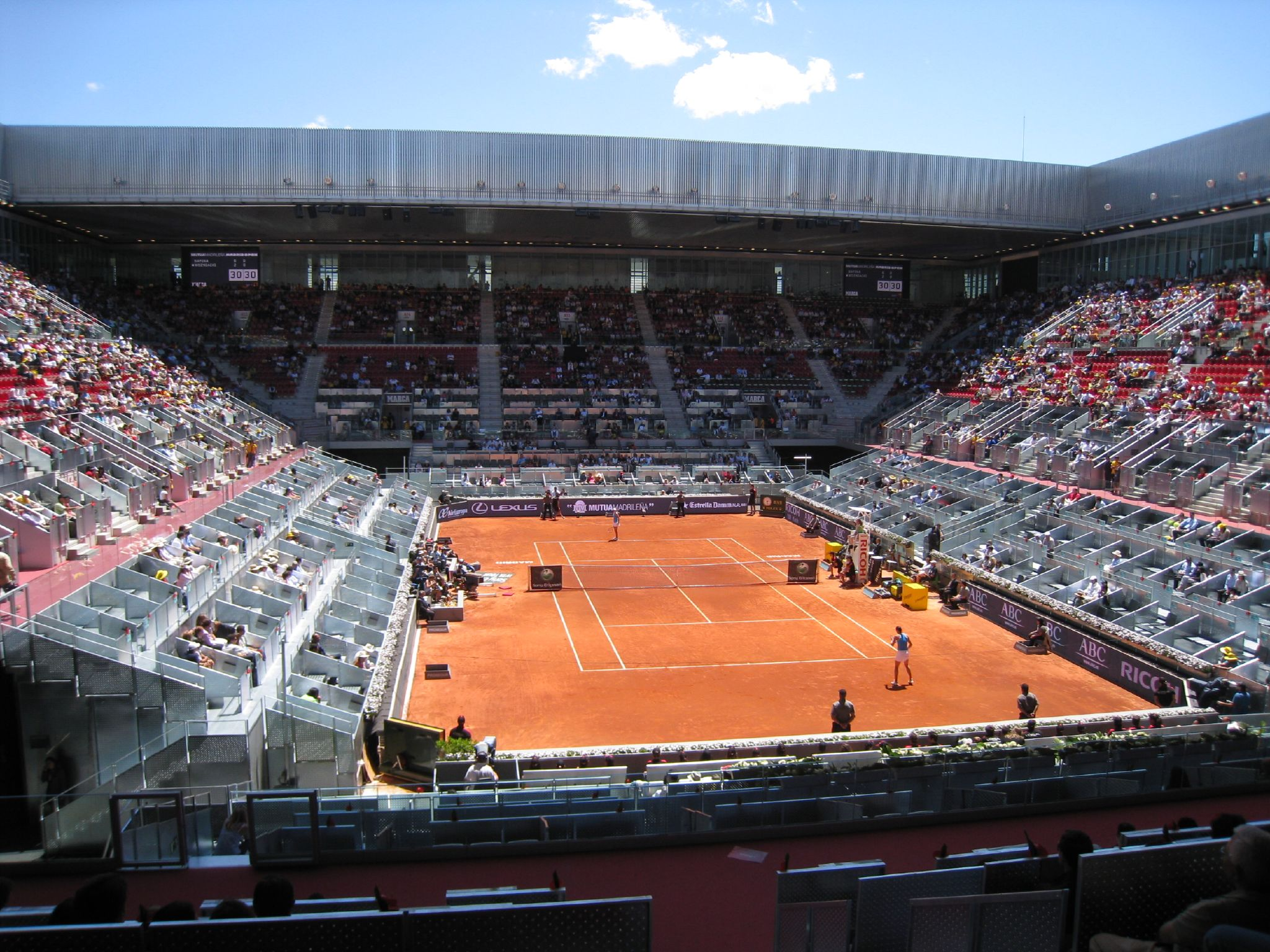
Caja Mágica, proposed venue for the Tennis competitions.

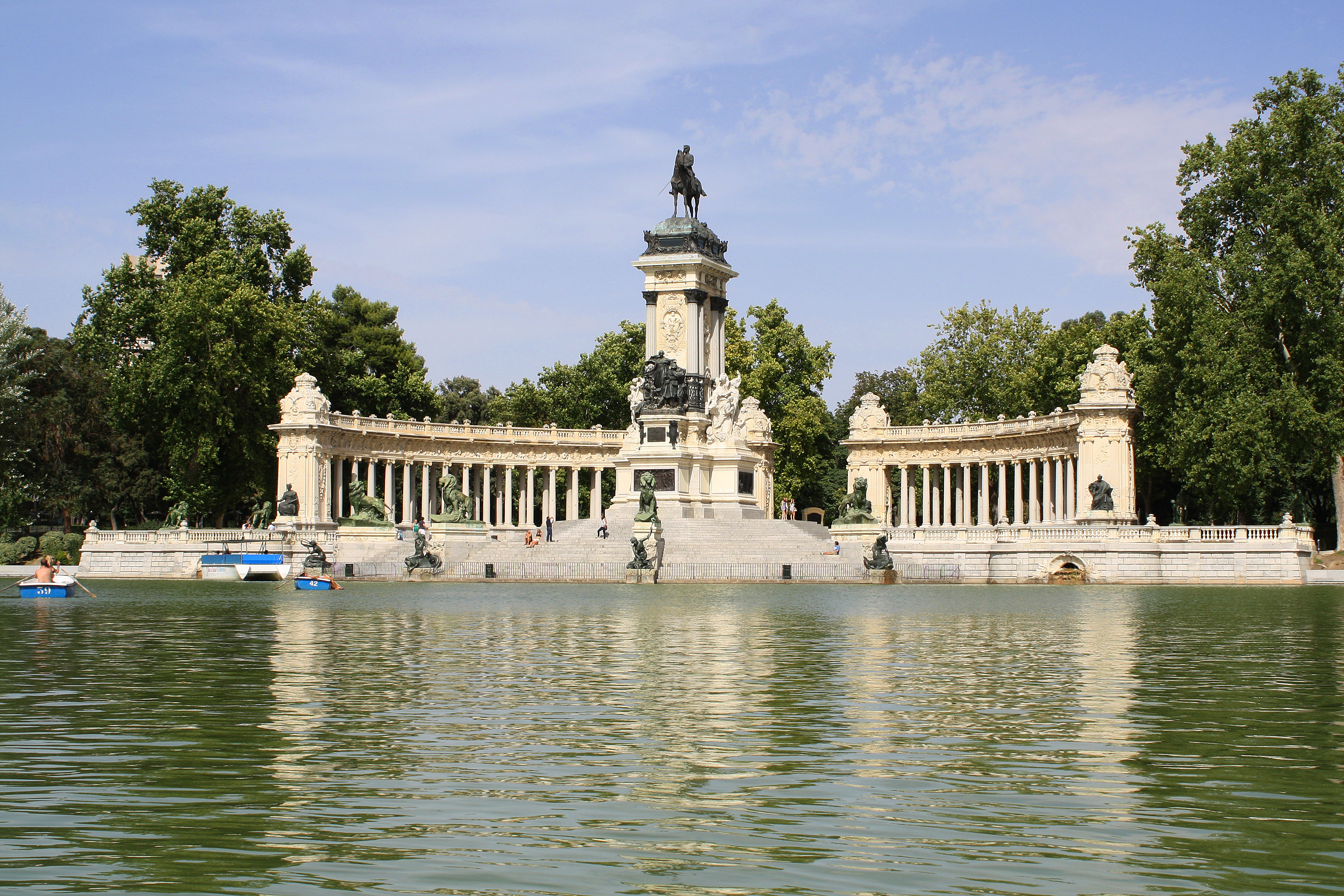
Pond at the Buen Retiro Park, proposed site for the temporary Beach Volleyball venue.

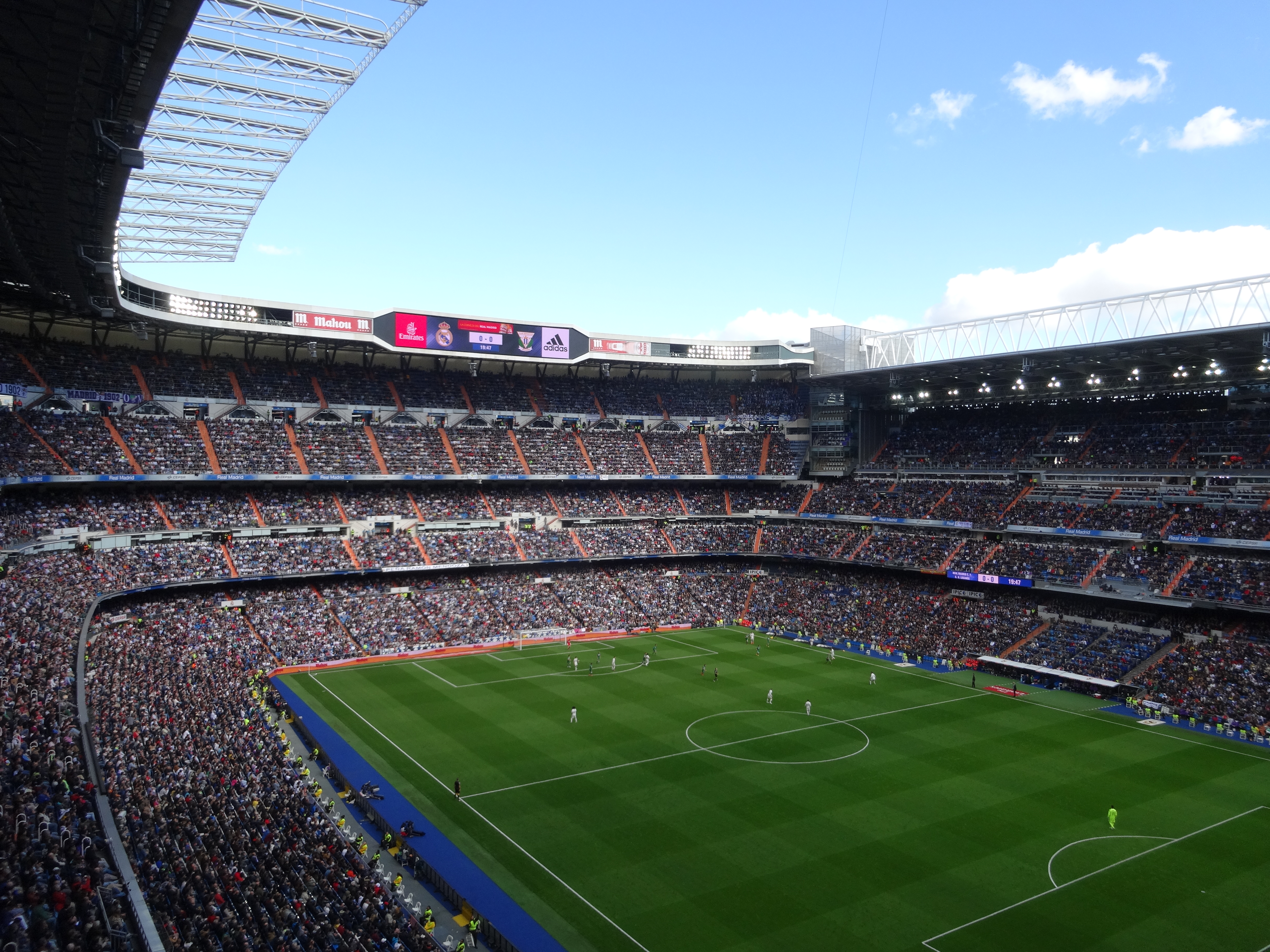
Santiago Bernabéu Stadium, proposed venue for the Football finals.

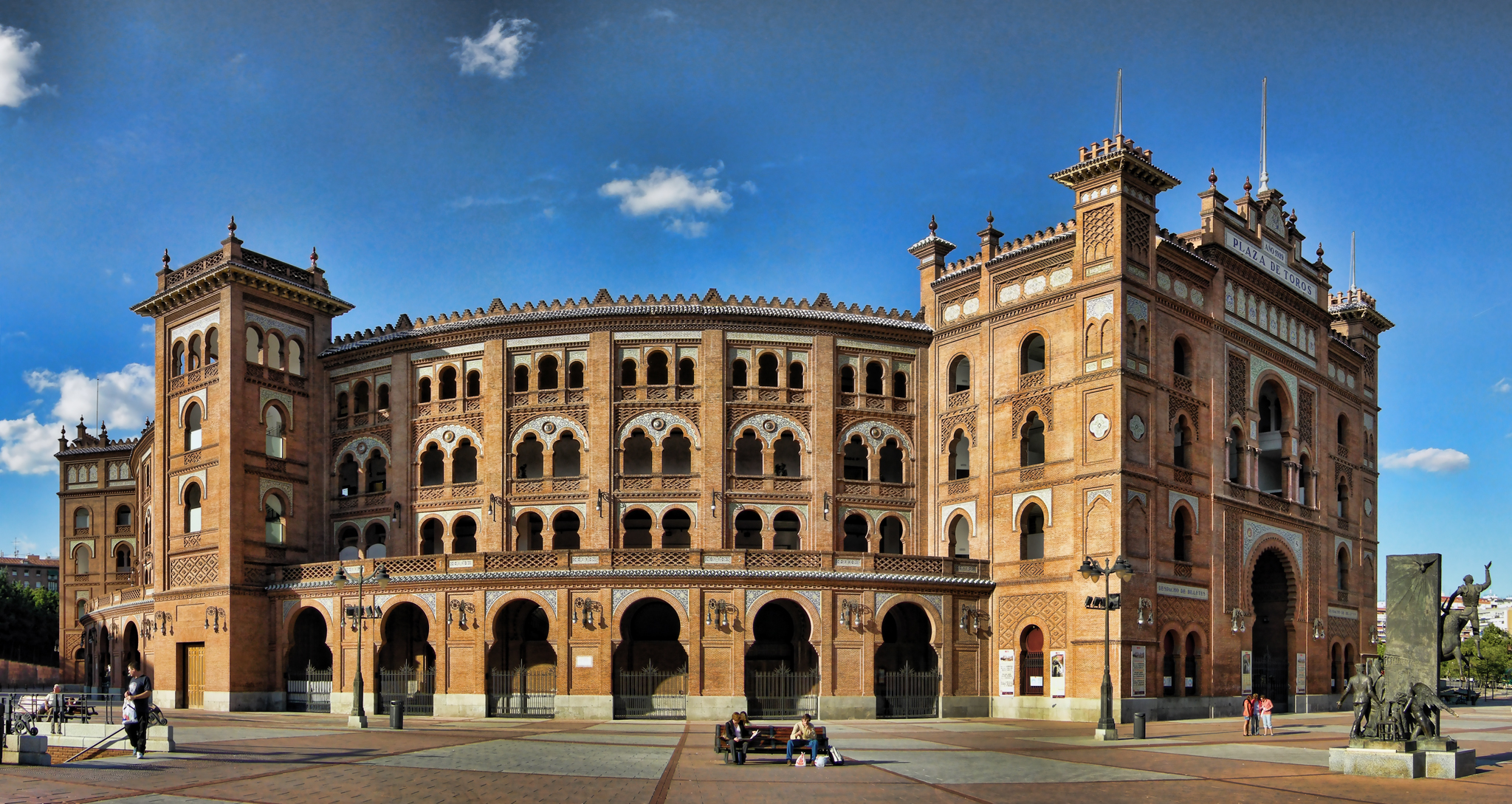
Las Ventas, proposed venue for the Basketball competitions.

For the 2020 Olympics, 28 of the 36 required venues already existed. Six permanent new venues needed to be constructed while two temporary venues would have been needed. The venues would comprise two zones.

=== Campo de las Naciones Zone ===
==== Olympic Park Cluster ====
- Olympic Stadium - Athletics, Ceremonies
- Aquatic Centre - Aquatics (swimming, diving, water polo and synchronised swimming)
- Gymnastics Pavilion - Gymnastics (artistic, rhythmic and trampoline)
- Velodrome - Cycling (track)
- BMX Track - Cycling (BMX)

==== IFEMA Cluster ====
- IFEMA Trade Fair Centre Halls - Badminton, Wrestling, Fencing, Weightlifting, Judo, Boxing, Taekwondo, Table Tennis
- Alfredo di Stéfano Stadium - Rugby
- Ciudad Real Madrid - Hockey

=== Manzanares Zone ===
==== Club de Campo Cluster ====
- La Zarzuela Hippodrome - Equestrian
- Club de Campo Villa de Madrid - Archery, Modern Pentathlon, Golf

==== Casa de Campo Cluster ====
- Mountain bike circuit - Cycling (mountain bike)
- Triathlon circuit - Triathlon
- Madrid Arena - Handball

==== Other venues ====
- Caja Mágica - Tennis
- Madrid/Getafe Regatta Centre - Rowing, Canoe/Kayak (sprint), Aquatics (marathon swimming)

=== Stand Alone venues ===
- Buen Retiro Park - Beach Volleyball
- La Gavia Slalom Course - Canoe/Kayak (slalom)
- Palacio de Deportes - Volleyball
- Santiago Bernabéu Stadium - Football (finals)
- Urban circuit - Cycling (road)
- Las Ventas - Basketball
- Paracuellos Shooting Centre - Shooting

=== Venues outside Madrid ===
- Port of Valencia - Sailing
- Estadi Olímpic Lluís Companys - Football
- La Romareda - Football
- Estadio Nuevo José Zorrilla - Football
- Estadio Nuevo Arcángel - Football
- La Rosaleda Stadium - Football

== See also ==
- Spain at the Olympics
