= Bids for the 2020 Summer Olympics =

Selection of the host for the 2020 Summer Olympics

Bids for the 2020 Summer Olympics and Paralympics
Overview
- Games of the XXXII Olympiad; XVI Paralympic Games
- Winner: Tokyo; Runner-up: Istanbul; Shortlist: Madrid

Details
- Committee: IOC
- Election venue: Buenos Aires; 125th IOC Session

Map of the bidding cities

Important dates
- Bid: 1 September 2011
- Decision: 7 September 2013

Decision
- Winner: Tokyo (60 votes)
- Runner-up: Istanbul (36 votes)

There were six bids initially submitted for the 2020 Summer Olympics. Tokyo was ultimately elected as the host city at the 125th IOC Session in Buenos Aires, Argentina, on 7 September 2013.

== Bidding process ==
The Olympic bidding process begins with the submission of a city's application to the International Olympic Committee (IOC) by its National Olympic Committee (NOC) and ends with the election of the host city by the members of the IOC during an ordinary session. The process is governed by the Olympic Charter, as stated in Chapter 5, Rule 34.

Since 1999, the process has consisted of two phases. During the first phase, which begins immediately after the bid submission deadline, the "applicant cities" are required to answer a questionnaire covering themes of importance to a successful Games organization. This information allows the IOC to analyze the cities' hosting capacities and the strengths and weaknesses of their plans. Following a detailed study of the submitted questionnaires and ensuing reports, the IOC Executive Board selects the cities that are qualified to proceed to the next phase. The second phase is the true candidature stage: the accepted applicant cities (from now on referred to as "candidate cities") are required to submit a second questionnaire in the form of an extended, more detailed, candidature file. These files are carefully studied by the IOC Evaluation Commission, a group composed of IOC members, representatives of international sport federations, NOCs, athletes, the International Paralympic Committee, and international experts in various fields. It is chaired by Sir Craig Reedie. The members of the Evaluation Commission then make four-day inspection visits to each of the candidate cities, where they check the proposed venues and are briefed about details of the themes covered in the candidature file. The Evaluation Commission communicates the results of its inspections in a report sent to the IOC members up to one month before the electing IOC Session.

The IOC Session in which a host city is elected takes place in a country that did not submit an application to stage the Olympics. The election is made by the assembled active IOC members (excluding honorary and honor members), each possessing one vote. Members from countries that have a city taking part in the election cannot vote while the city is in the running. The voting is conducted in a succession of rounds until one bid achieves an absolute majority of votes; if this does not happen in the first round, the bid with the fewest votes is eliminated and another voting round begins. In the case of a tie for the lowest number of votes, a special runoff vote is carried out, with the winner proceeding to the next round. After each round, the eliminated bid is announced. Following the announcement of the host city, the successful bid delegation signs the "Host City Contract" with the IOC, which delegates the responsibilities of the Games organisation to the city and respective NOC.

=== Bidding timeline ===
The timeline of the host city selection process was approved by the International Olympic Committee (IOC) executive board as follows:

- 2011:

16 May – IOC sent letters inviting the National Olympic Committees (NOCs) to submit bids
July and August – IOC asked for NOCs to submit letters regarding compliance with the World Anti-doping Agency code by 29 July. The IOC also requested submissions of proposed dates if countries want to stage the Games outside the normal period set by the IOC (15 July to 31 August). The IOC responded to NOCs on these points by the end of August.
1 September – Deadline to submit the names of cities interested in hosting the 2020 Summer Games
2 September – IOC confirmed that they had received six bids
3–4 November – IOC held an information seminar for 2020 applicants
8 December – IOC announced the drawing lots order of applicant cities

- 2012:

15 February – application files and guarantee letters submitted to the IOC
23 May – IOC executive board in Quebec City decided which cities were to be approved as official candidate cities
27 July – 12 August – Olympic Games Observers’ Programme at the Games of the XXX Olympiad in London
14–21 November – 2012 Olympic Games debrief in Rio de Janeiro

- 2013:

7 January – Candidature Files Submitted
4–7 March – IOC Evaluation Commission visited Tokyo
18–21 March – IOC Evaluation Commission visited Madrid
24–27 March – IOC Evaluation Commission visited Istanbul
25 June – Report of the IOC evaluation commission
3–4 July – Candidate cities briefing to IOC Members at Extraordinary session in Lausanne
7 September – Election of the host city at 125th IOC Session in Buenos Aires

=== Evaluation of applicant cities ===
Six cities were put forward by their respective National Olympic Committees (NOCs) to apply to host the Games initially, but Rome withdrew its bid shortly before the applicant files were due. The bidding cities come from two continents, Europe and Asia (Istanbul is considered to be located on the border between Asia and Europe). In 2020 it will be twelve years since an Asian city hosted the Summer Olympics (Beijing 2008) and eight years since a European city hosted the Summer Olympics (London 2012). Out of the six bidders, Tokyo had previously hosted the Summer Olympic Games in 1964. The other four bidders have made bids in the past. It is the first time in 20 years that no city in the Americas bid to host the Summer Olympic Games. Rio de Janeiro was awarded the 2016 Summer Olympics. Baku and Doha bid for the 2016 Games but failed to become candidate cities, while Tokyo and Madrid also bid for the 2016 Games and became candidate cities.

Table of scores given by the IOC Working Group to assess the quality and feasibility of the 2020 Applicant cities
Criteria	Istanbul		Tokyo		Baku		Doha		Madrid	
Criteria	TUR		JPN		AZE		QAT		ESP	
Criteria	Min	Max	Min	Max	Min	Max	Min	Max	Min	Max
Games concept and competition venues	6.0	8.0	7.0	9.0	4.0	7.0	5.5	8.0	8.0	9.0
Olympic village(s)	6.0	8.0	8.0	9.0	5.0	8.0	7.0	9.5	7.0	9.0
International broadcast centre / media press centre	6.0	8.0	8.0	9.0	4.0	6.0	7.0	9.0	6.0	9.0
Sports experience	5.5	7.0	7.0	8.0	3.5	5.5	5.0	7.5	7.5	8.5
Environment and meteorology	5.0	7.0	5.5	8.0	4.0	7.0	4.0	6.0	7.5	9.0
Accommodation	6.0	8.0	9.0	10.0	3.0	5.0	5.0	8.0	8.0	9.0
Transport	5.0	7.0	8.0	9.0	4.0	7.0	6.0	8.0	8.0	9.0
Medical services and doping control	7.0	8.0	8.0	9.0	5.0	7.0	8.0	9.0	8.0	9.0
Safety and security	6.0	7.0	7.0	9.0	4.0	6.0	6.0	7.0	7.0	8.0
Telecommunications	6.0	8.0	9.0	9.0	5.0	7.0	7.0	8.0	9.0	9.0
Energy	6.0	8.0	5.0	8.0	4.0	5.5	7.0	9.0	8.0	9.0
Legal aspects, customs, immigration formalities	7.0	9.0	7.0	9.0	6.0	7.0	6.0	7.0	7.0	9.0
Government and public support	8.0	9.0	6.0	9.0	7.0	9.0	8.0	9.0	7.0	9.0
Finance and marketing	6.0	8.0	7.0	8.0	4.0	6.0	8.0	9.0	5.0	8.0

=== Final selection process ===
The IOC voted to select the host city of the 2020 Summer Olympics on 7 September 2013 at the 125th IOC Session at the Buenos Aires Hilton in Buenos Aires, Argentina. An exhaustive ballot system was used. No city won over 50% of the votes in the first round, and Madrid and Istanbul were tied for second place. A run-off vote between these two cities was held to determine which would be eliminated. In the final vote, a head-to-head contest between Tokyo and Istanbul, Tokyo was selected at 20:20 UTC (5:20 pm Buenos Aires time, 5:20 am Tokyo Time 8 September 2013) by 60 votes to 36 votes.

2020 Summer Olympics host city election
City	Team	Round 1	Runoff	Round 2
Tokyo	Japan	42	—	60
Istanbul	Turkey	26	49	36
Madrid	Spain	26	45	—

== Bidding cities ==
The candidate cities for the 2020 Olympics were, in order of drawing lots:

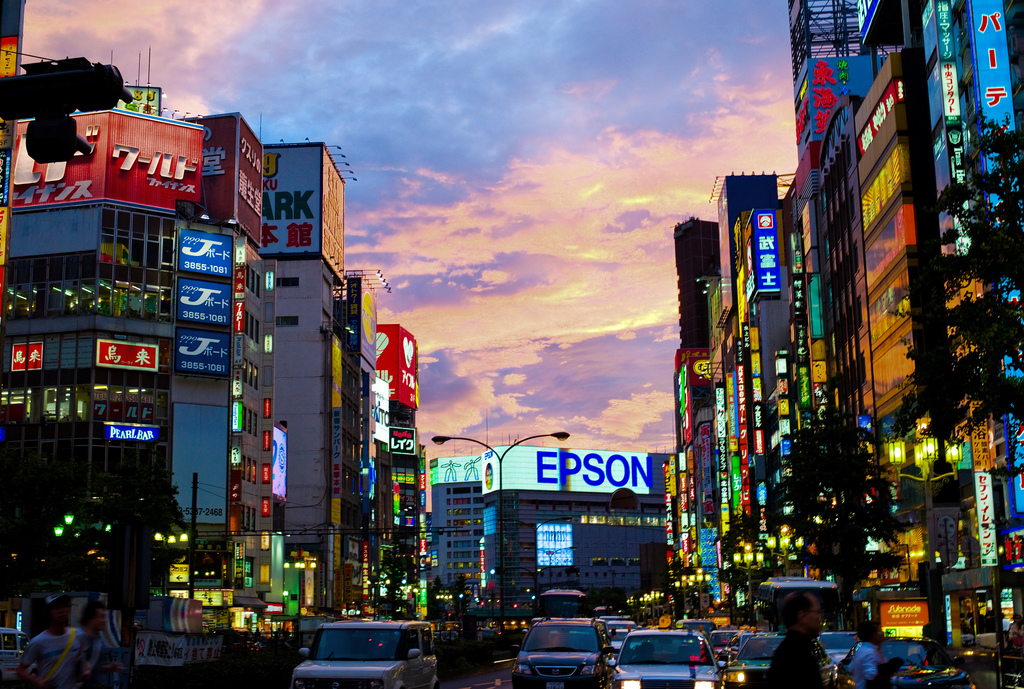
Sunset in Shinjuku

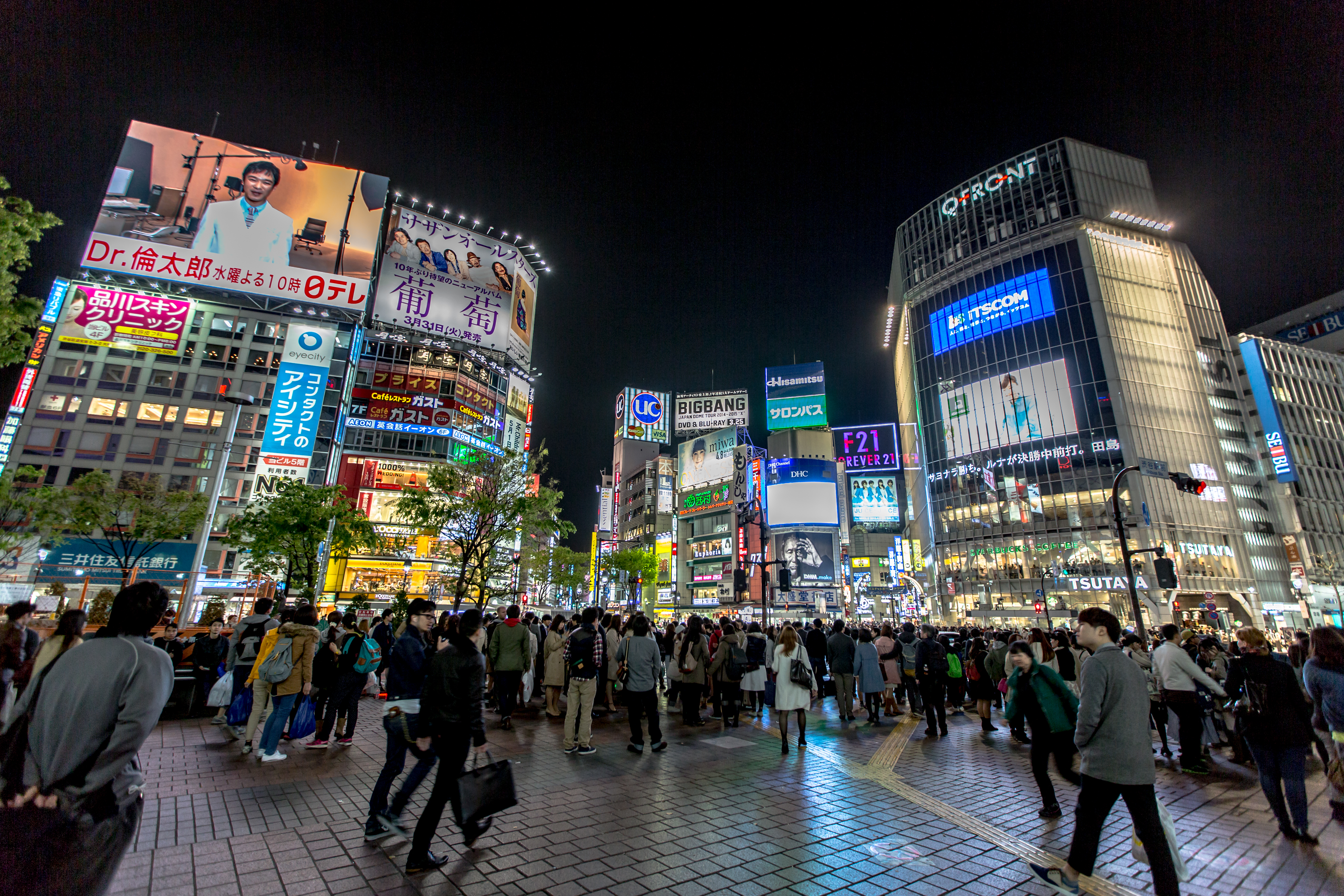
Shibuya at night

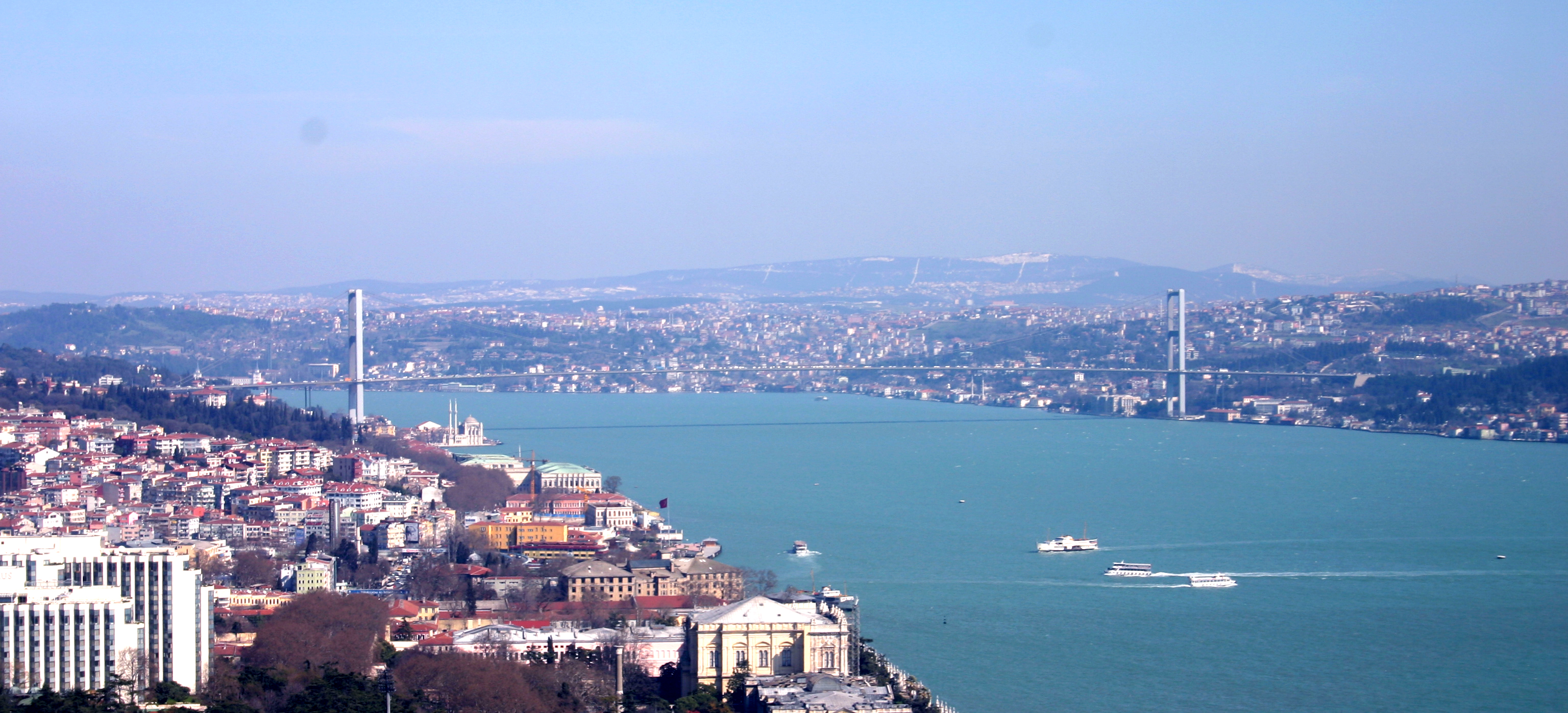
View of the Bosphorus in Istanbul

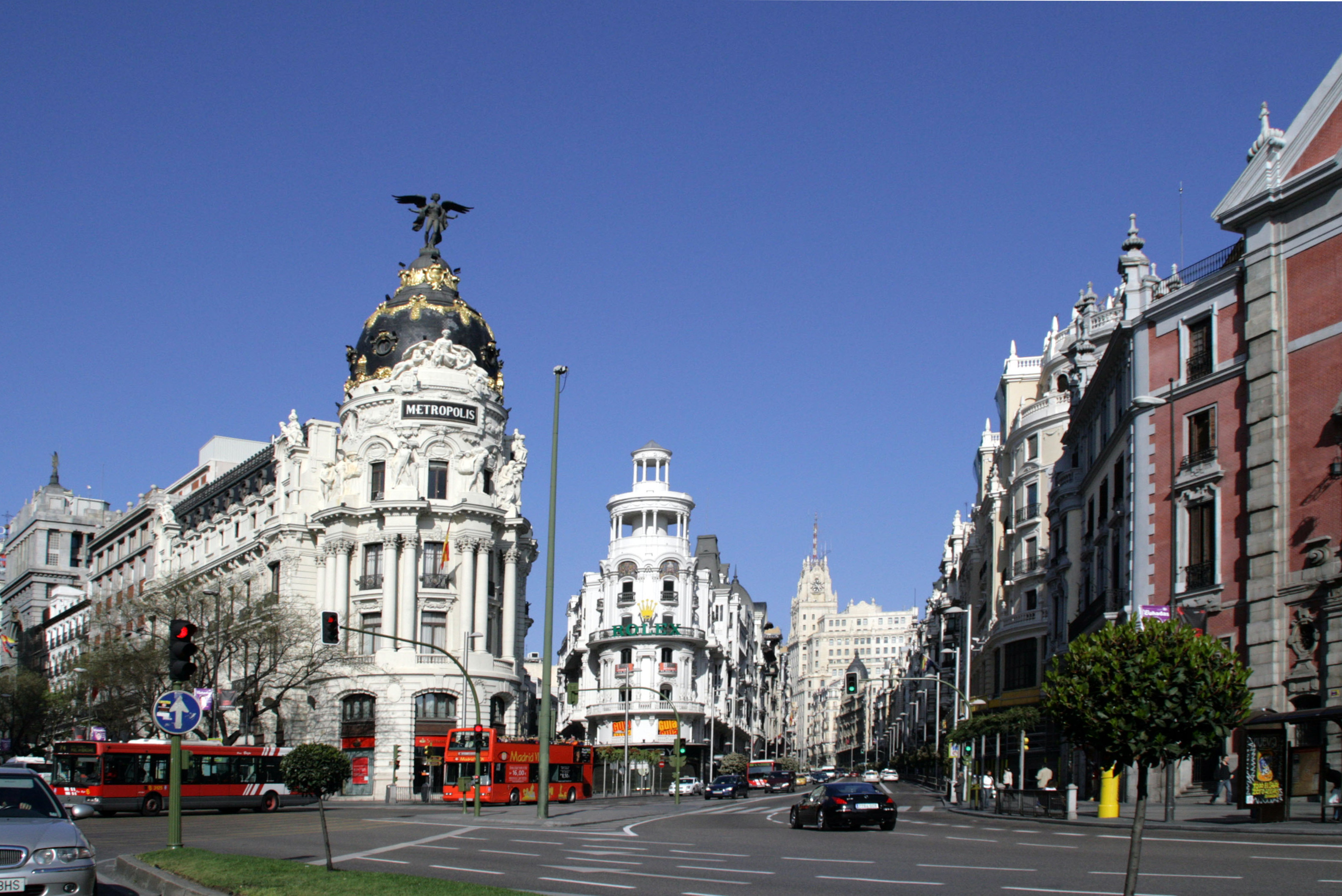
Alcalá Street and the Metropolis Building

=== Candidate cities ===
City	Country	National Olympic Committee	Result
Tokyo	Japan	Japanese Olympic Committee (JOC)	Winner
Further information: Tokyo bid for the 2020 Summer Olympics Tokyo was selected by the Japanese Olympic Committee on 16 July 2011, and was confirmed as Japan's bidding city for the 2020 Games. Hiroshima was considering making a bid for the games but opted to pull out following poor public reaction to the bid as well as a lack of funding. Tokyo hosted the 1964 Summer Olympics. Japan has also hosted the Winter Olympics in 1972 and 1998 which were organized in Sapporo and Nagano respectively. Japan previously co-hosted the 2002 FIFA World Cup with South Korea; the final was held in Yokohama, near Tokyo. Further, Japan hosted the 2006 FIBA World Championship. In 2011, the Gymnastics World Championships were also held in Tokyo. Japan also hosted the 2019 Rugby World Cup and two of the venues for the event are located in the Greater Tokyo Area.
Istanbul	Turkey	Turkish Olympic Committee (TMOK)	First runner-up
Further information: Istanbul bid for the 2020 Summer Olympics Istanbul was nominated on 7 July 2011, at the 123rd IOC session, and was confirmed as Turkey's bid on 24 July 2011. Istanbul hosted the 2005 UEFA Champions League Final, 2009 UEFA Cup Final and 2013 FIFA U-20 World Cup in football, the 2010 FIBA World Championship for Men, the Euroleague 2011–12 Final Four in basketball, the WTA Tour Championships in tennis, the 2012 FINA World Swimming Championships (25 m), and the 2012 IAAF World Indoor Championships in athletics. Istanbul also hosted the 2013 WTA Tour Championships, the 2014 FIBA World Championship for Women, and considered a bid for the 2032 Summer Olympics.
Madrid	Spain	Spanish Olympic Committee (COE)	Second runner-up
Further information: Madrid bid for the 2020 Summer Olympics Madrid was nominated by the Spanish Olympic Committee executive committee on 1 June 2011. Madrid's 2020 bid was their third consecutive bid. Spain previously hosted the 1992 Summer Olympics at Barcelona. Spain hosted the 1982 FIFA World Cup and the final was held in Madrid. It has also hosted the final of European Champions League (1957, 1969, 1980, 2010); the final of Europa League (1985, 1986); final of the FIBA EuroBasket (several times); 1974 EuroHockey Nations Championship; European Judo Championships (1965, 1973, 1981); 2005 UCI Road World Championships; European Karate Championships (1983, 1986); 2005 World Taekwondo Championships; 2002 World Cup in Athletics; Intercontinental Cup (1960, 1966, 1974); 2004 European Aquatics Championships; 1964 European Nations' Cup; 2003 FIVB Volleyball World League; European Athletics Indoor Championships (1968, 1986, 2005); UCI Mountain Bike World Cup (every year); WTA Tour Championships (2006, 2007); Spanish International Badminton Tournament (every year); 1986 World Aquatics Championships and several other. Spain hosted the 1986 FIBA World Championship and hosted the 2014 FIBA Basketball World Cup; the 2014 final match was held at the Palacio de los Deportes de la Comunidad de Madrid in Madrid.

=== Non-selected applicant cities ===
- Baku, Azerbaijan

It was announced at the 1 September 2011 deadline for bidding that Baku had submitted a bid to host the 2020 Olympics. Baku submitted their application file to the IOC on 1 February 2012. The National Assembly of Azerbaijan voted to endorse the bid in February 2012. Baku hosted the 2015 European Games.

- Doha, Qatar

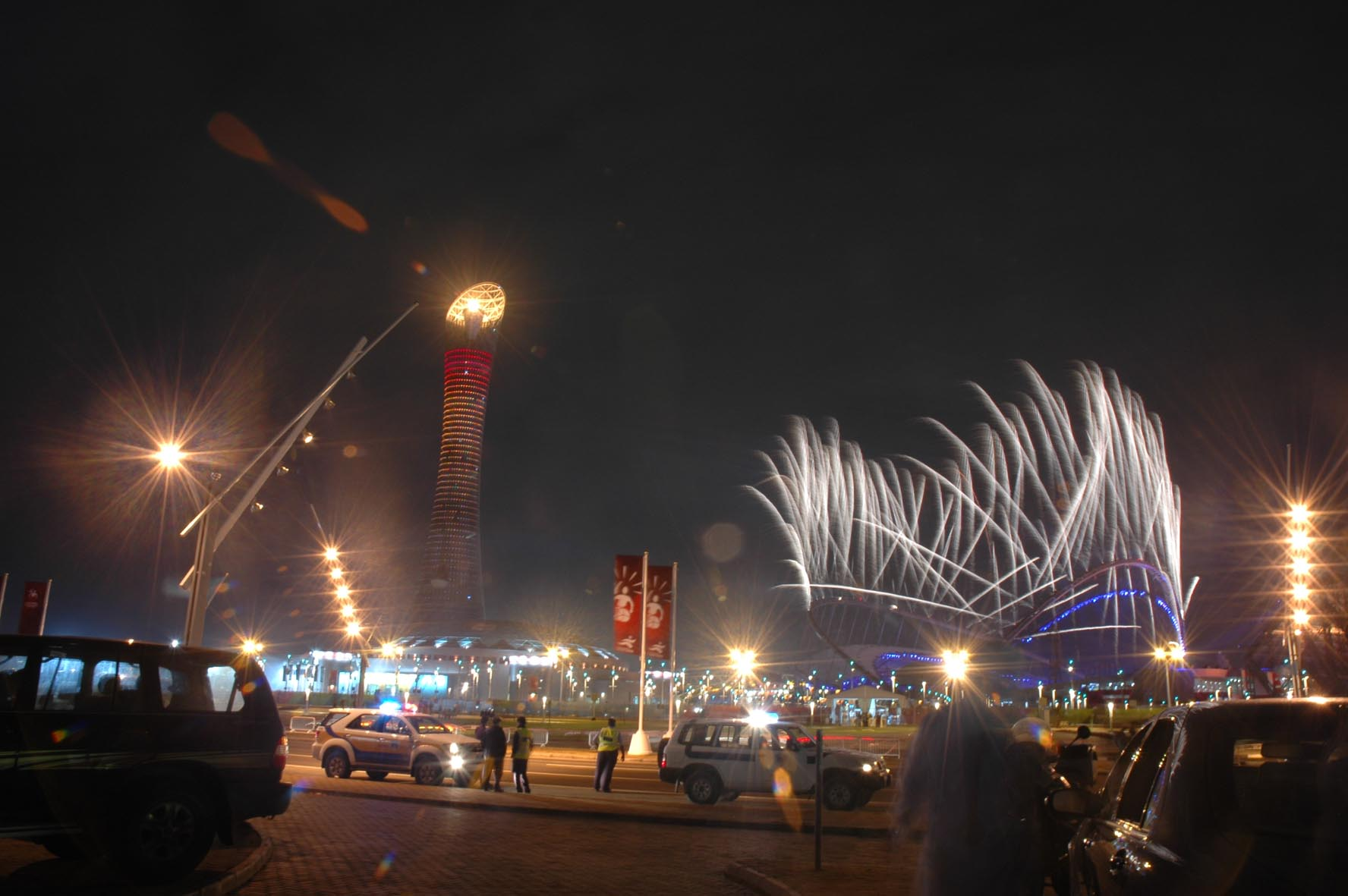
Fireworks at the 2006 Asian Games

On 26 August 2011, Doha announced that it was bidding for the 2020 Games.

Doha hosted the 2006 Asian Games and the 2011 Pan Arab Games. In 2010, Qatar was selected to host the 2022 FIFA World Cup. Several stadiums will be located in Doha. The country also hosted the 1988 and 2011 AFC Asian Cups.

=== Cancelled bid ===
- Rome, Italy

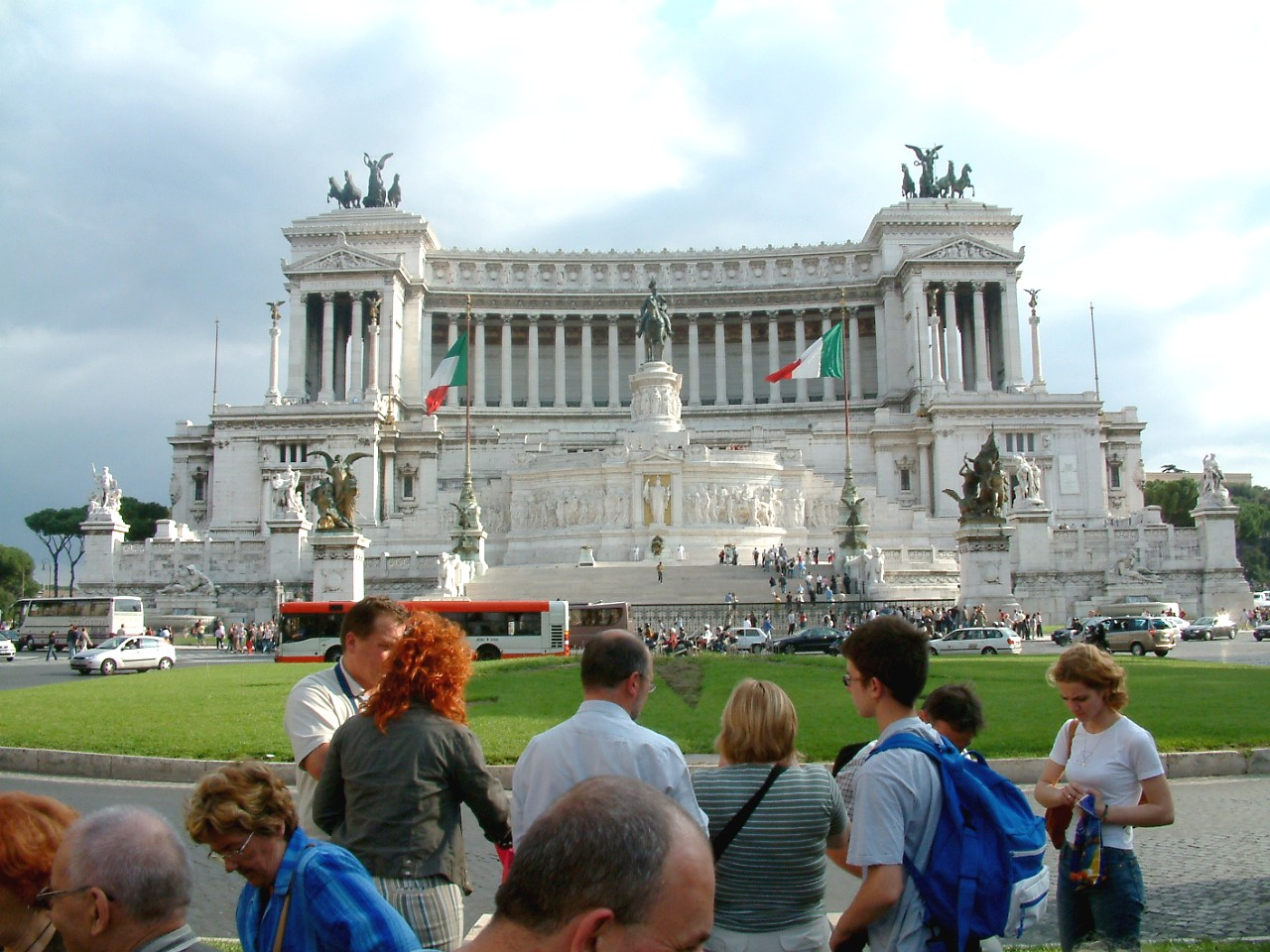
View of Vittorio Emmanuele II Monument in Rome

Rome was nominated by the Italian National Olympic Committee on 19 May 2010. Italy's capital city was chosen over Venice as the country's bid for the 2020 Games.

Rome previously hosted the Summer Olympics in 1960 and was chosen to host the 1908 Summer Olympics, but was relocated to London due to the 1906 eruption of Mount Vesuvius. It bid to host the 2004 Games but lost to Athens in the final round of voting. Rome hosted the 2009 World Aquatics Championships as well as the 1990 FIFA World Cup Final. Italy previously hosted the 2006 Winter Olympics in Turin and the 1956 Winter Olympics in Cortina d'Ampezzo. Italy will also host the 2026 Winter Olympics via a joint bid between Milan and Cortina d’Ampezzo.

However the Rome municipal administration withdrew its support from the bid on the eve of the delivery of the application files, stating that it would not be a responsible use of money in "Italy's current condition."

=== Proposed bids which did not go to application ===
The following cities had proposed bidding; however, they did not bid or even formally announce their intentions to bid. Those cities that won the bid for the next Olympics do include: Paris, France, was eventually selected to host the 2024 Olympic Games, as France pulled out of the 2020 bid following the defeat of Annecy's bid for the 2018 Winter Olympics. 2024 will coincide with the 100th anniversary of the 1924 Olympics which were held in the French capital. Various cities in the United States were interested in bidding, but the USOC confirmed that the US would not bid, citing an ongoing dispute with the IOC. The IOC stated that it would like to have received a bid for 2020 from the United States. On 29 August 2011, it was revealed that Las Vegas submitted a bid to the IOC without USOC consent. The IOC rejected the bid. Nearby Los Angeles in California who hosted the 1932 Summer Olympics and the 1984 Summer Olympics will host the 2028 Summer Olympics.

In Germany, Berlin, after it had hosted the cancelled Olympics due to World War I in 1916, then another one in 1936, it had failed the bidding in 2000 and 2020. Budapest also bid for both 1916, 1920, 1936, 1944, 1960, 2020 and 2028; but in the end it was not selected.

Kuala Lumpur had started to bid for the 2008 Summer Olympics, but it was not selected in 2001. Then, Kuala Lumpur decided to bid for the future Olympics considering the increasing public transport connectivity with the Mass Rapid Transit that is opened in 2017. With the change of governments since 2018, the high-speed rail was cancelled. Instead, Kuala Lumpur would go on to host the 128th IOC Session, where the IOC selected the host city for 2022 Winter Olympics. At India, Delhi, had the intention to bid for the Olympics, in the end it was not successful. Cairo (Egypt), Casablanca (Morocco), Durban (South Africa) and Nairobi (Kenya) had also bid for the Olympics in Africa, which will be the first African city to host if selected. It was announced on 17 August 2011 that South Africa will not put forth a 2020 bid. Otherwise, in Dubai (UAE), it was considering a bid for 2020 Summer Olympics but decided to wait until 2024, while the fact is that in the Arab continent, it was the first to host the 2022 FIFA World Cup at Qatar. In North America, Guadalajara was not selected and Toronto had long considered a bid for the 2020 Summer Olympics, especially after their successful bid for the 2015 Pan American Games, but announced on 11 August 2011 that the idea will be dropped due to budgetary restrictions. In Europe, Lisbon has been the first time bidding in the Olympics, but in Russia, St Petersburg decided not to bid despite having discussed the plan with the head of the Russian Olympic Committee. They withdrew on 22 August 2011, instead planning on bidding for either 2024 or 2028. Prague was cancelled due to the Great Recession and the 2009 swine flu pandemic. Bucharest also decided not to proceed because the city hall's general counsellors believed the project would be unachievable.

Busan did not put forth the bid following Pyeongchang's successful bid for the 2018 Winter Olympics, but instead bid for the future Olympics.

Hobart, Australia, placed a bid for 2020 Summer Olympics but the bid was unsuccessful.

== Proposed dates ==
	Games of the XXXII Olympiad	XVI Paralympic Games	Slogan
Tokyo	24 July - 9 August	25 August - 6 September	"Discover Tomorrow"
Istanbul	7-23 August	9-20 September	"Bridge Together"
Madrid	7-23 August	11-22 September	"Illuminate the Future"
