= Istanbul bid for the 2020 Summer Olympics =

Entry by the Turkish city in the competition to host the sporting festival

Bids for the 2020 Summer Olympics and Paralympics
Overview
- Games of the XXXII Olympiad; XVI Paralympic Games
- Winner: Tokyo; Runner-up: Istanbul; Shortlist: Madrid

Details
- City: Istanbul, Turkey
- Chair: Hasan Arat
- NOC: Turkish Olympic Committee (TMOK)

Previous Games hosted
- None • Bid for 2000, 2008 and 2012

Decision
- Result: 1st runner-up (36 votes)

Istanbul 2020 (Turkish: İstanbul 2020) was a bid for the 2020 Summer Olympics by the city of Istanbul and the Turkish Olympic Committee.

== History ==
=== Applicant City phase ===
The Turkish Olympic Committee (TMOK) announced the selection of Istanbul as Turkey's candidate on July 7, 2011. Turkey's candidacy was announced officially by Prime Minister Erdogan on August 13, 2011.

Hasan Arat, who heads Istanbul 2020 Bid committee, was optimistic about the city's fifth bid, stating that over the past several years the city has seen the development of new venues and infrastructure improvements. He also stated that Turkey's fast growing economy could also greatly benefit the bid.

In January 2012, Istanbul 2020 sent a delegation to the 2012 Winter Youth Olympics in Innsbruck to help promote the bid.

In March 2012, Istanbul successfully hosted the 2012 IAAF World Indoor Championships, which was seen as a positive step forward for Istanbul's bid to host the 2020 Olympics.

In March 2012, Prime Minister Tayyip Erdogan stated that Turkey is also interested in bidding to host the 2020 UEFA European Football Championship. Turkey bid to host UEFA Euro 2016 but lost to France by one vote. In April 2012, Turkey submitted a bid to host the UEFA Euro 2020 Championship. Istanbul 2020 has stated that the Olympic bid still had the support of the government. On May 8, 2012, IOC President Jacques Rogge stated that if Istanbul was to be awarded the 2020 Olympics that they would have to withdraw as hosts of UEFA Euro 2020. IOC rules state that an Olympic host nation may not host another major sporting event in the country in the same year as the Olympics. While it initially looked like Turkey would be the sole bidder for UEFA Euro 2020, two other bids for the event have also been submitted. A joint bid among Ireland, Scotland and Wales was submitted. In addition, a bid from Azerbaijan and Georgia was also submitted.

=== Candidate City phase ===
On May 23, 2012, the IOC Selected Istanbul as a Candidate City for the 2020 Summer Olympics. Right after being shortlisted as a candidate city, it was announced that the Vice President of the Turkish Olympic Committee Hasan Arat would serve as the head of Istanbul's bid for the 2020 Olympics.

In July 2012, the bid received the endorsement of American Olympic gold-medalist Mark Spitz who won a total of nine Olympic gold medals between 1968 and 1972. The Prime Minister of Turkey, Recep Tayyip Erdogan attended the London 2012 Olympics.

At the end of May 2012, it was announced that a third bridge over the Bosphorus would be built. This bridge will help to ease traffic in the city should Istanbul be successful in being awarded the 2020 Olympics. The bridge was set to open by 2015, and was part of the original application. The Istanbul Metro has 58 stations in service, with 23 more under construction.

It was announced in December 2012 that the UEFA Euro 2020 Championship would be held throughout Europe rather than being held among one or two host nations. This decision, therefore, eliminated the potential conflict Turkey would have had due to that fact they had bids to host the Olympics and the UEFA Championship in the same year.

In December 2012, Istanbul hosted the 2012 FINA Short Course World Championships at the Sinan Erdem Dome.

Istanbul 2020 submitted its candidature file to the IOC on January 7, 2013. The IOC Evaluation Commission visited Istanbul from March 24 to March 27, 2013. On March 25 Istanbul 2020 revealed the bid's slogan, "Bridge Together". The slogan represents how Istanbul is a city that is located on two continents.

In April 2013, Tokyo 2020 Chairman Naoki Inose created controversy when he made a comment that was seen as a criticism of Istanbul and their bid for the 2020 Summer Olympics. Inose was quoted saying, “Well, compare the two countries where they have yet to build infrastructure, very sophisticated facilities. So from time to time, like in Brazil, I think it's good to have a venue for the first time. But Islamic countries, the only thing they share in common is Allah and they are fighting with each other and they have classes.” Criticizing rival bids are forbidden under IOC rules. Following Inose's statement, Tokyo 2020 made a statement saying that they "have the utmost respect for all candidate cities and have always taken pride in bidding in a spirit based on the Olympic values of excellence, respect, and friendship.” Inose apologized for his comments a few days later and stated that he was "fully committed" to respecting IOC rules.

In June 2013, Istanbul mayor Kadir Topbaş gave an interview expressing concern that the police's actions following an anti-government protest would jeopardize Istanbul's bid to host the 2020 Summer Olympics, saying "As Istanbul's mayor going through such an event, the fact that the whole world watched saddens me. How will we explain it? With what claims will we host the 2020 Olympic Games?" Istanbul 2020 released a statement saying that "despite these recent events, all sections of Turkey remain united in our dream to host our nation’s first-ever Olympic and Paralympic Games in 2020." IOC President Jacques Rogge stated that these events would not negatively impact the city's bid. IOC Presidential Candidate Thomas Bach also stated that he did not believe that these events would hurt the bid. The President of the NOCT, Uğur Erdener stated that these events would strengthen the bid. Turkey Daily Press reported that an anonymous IOC member from Europe stated that the protests which have seen police brutality against peaceful protesters was a "big blow" to Istanbul's bid.

The 2020 IOC Evaluation Commission Report on the Candidate Cities for the 2020 Summer Olympics was released on June 25.

Istanbul 2020 gave a presentation of their bid to the IOC at an Extraordinary session in Lausanne in July 2013.

Mersin hosted the 2013 Mediterranean Games from June 20 to June 30, 2013. Turkey hosted the 2013 FIFA U-20 World Cup from June 21 to July 13, 2013.

==== 125th IOC Session ====
The host city of the 2020 Summer Olympics was elected at the 125th IOC Session in Buenos Aires, Argentina on September 7, 2013. Tokyo competed against Madrid and Istanbul in the election and finished second with Tokyo ultimately being elected as the host city.

2020 Summer Olympics host city election
City	Team	Round 1	Runoff	Round 2
Tokyo	Japan	42	—	60
Istanbul	Turkey	26	49	36
Madrid	Spain	26	45	—

=== Outlook, Conclusion and Future ===
Istanbul's bid was considered to have been damaged by the 2013 protests in Turkey, doping scandals as well as the 2011 Turkish football corruption scandal.

Following Istanbul's failure to secure the 2020 Olympics, Turkey launched a bid to host the semi-finals and final of UEFA Euro 2020 at Istanbul's Atatürk Olympic Stadium. Istanbul will host the 2027 European Games as well. The city is also actively bidding to host the 2036 Summer Olympics.

== Previous bids ==
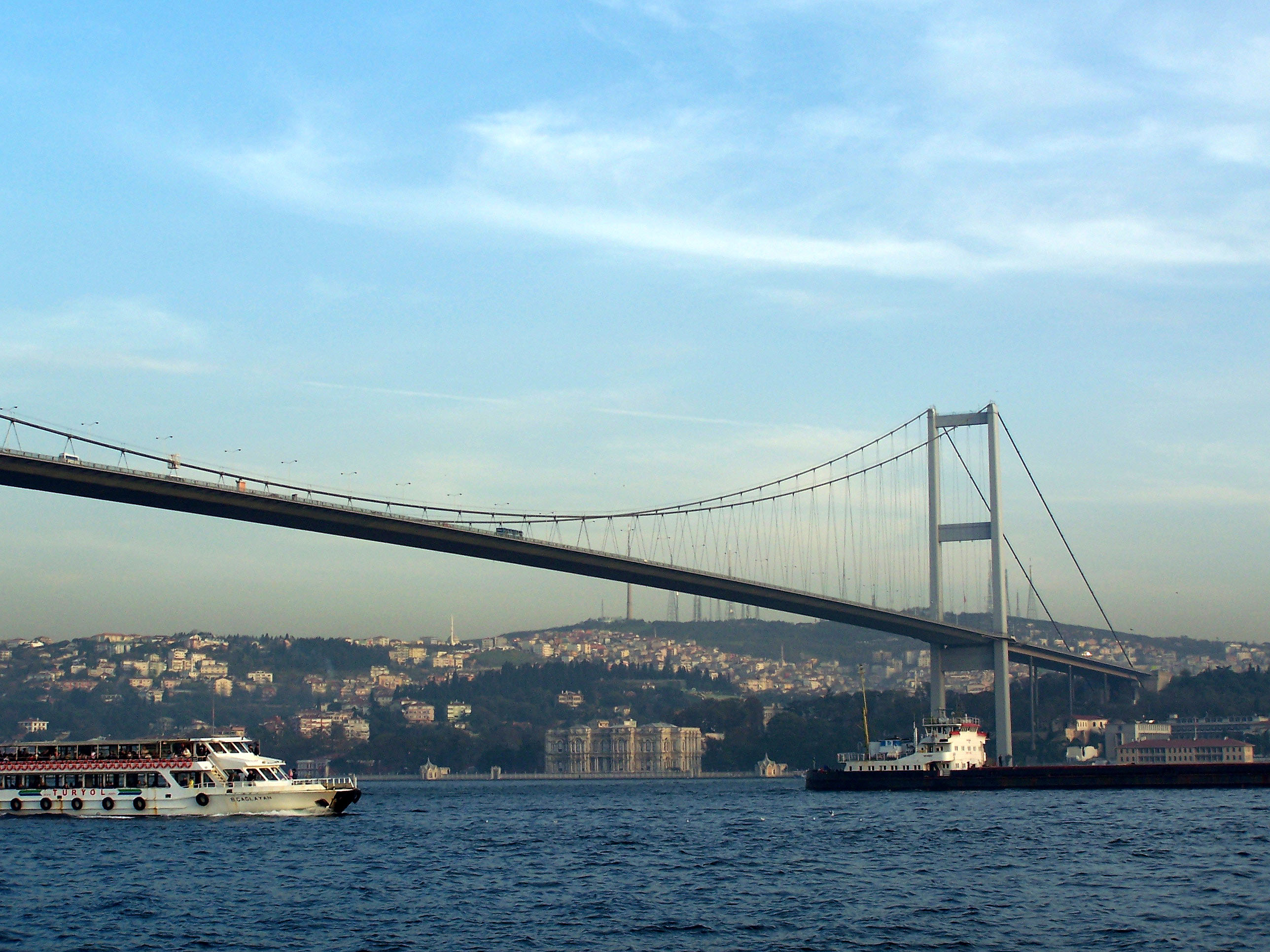
The Intercontinental Istanbul Eurasia Marathon crosses the Bosphorus Bridge from Asia to Europe.

Turkey has yet to host an Olympic Games. Istanbul has made four previous bids for the Summer Games. The city was a candidate for the 2000 Games which were awarded to Sydney. It bid again for 2004, which were held in Athens, but failed to become a candidate city. It became a candidate for 2008 but lost to Beijing. The Turkish city's most recent bid was for the 2012 Games but it failed to become a candidate. London was awarded the 2012 Games.

== Overview ==
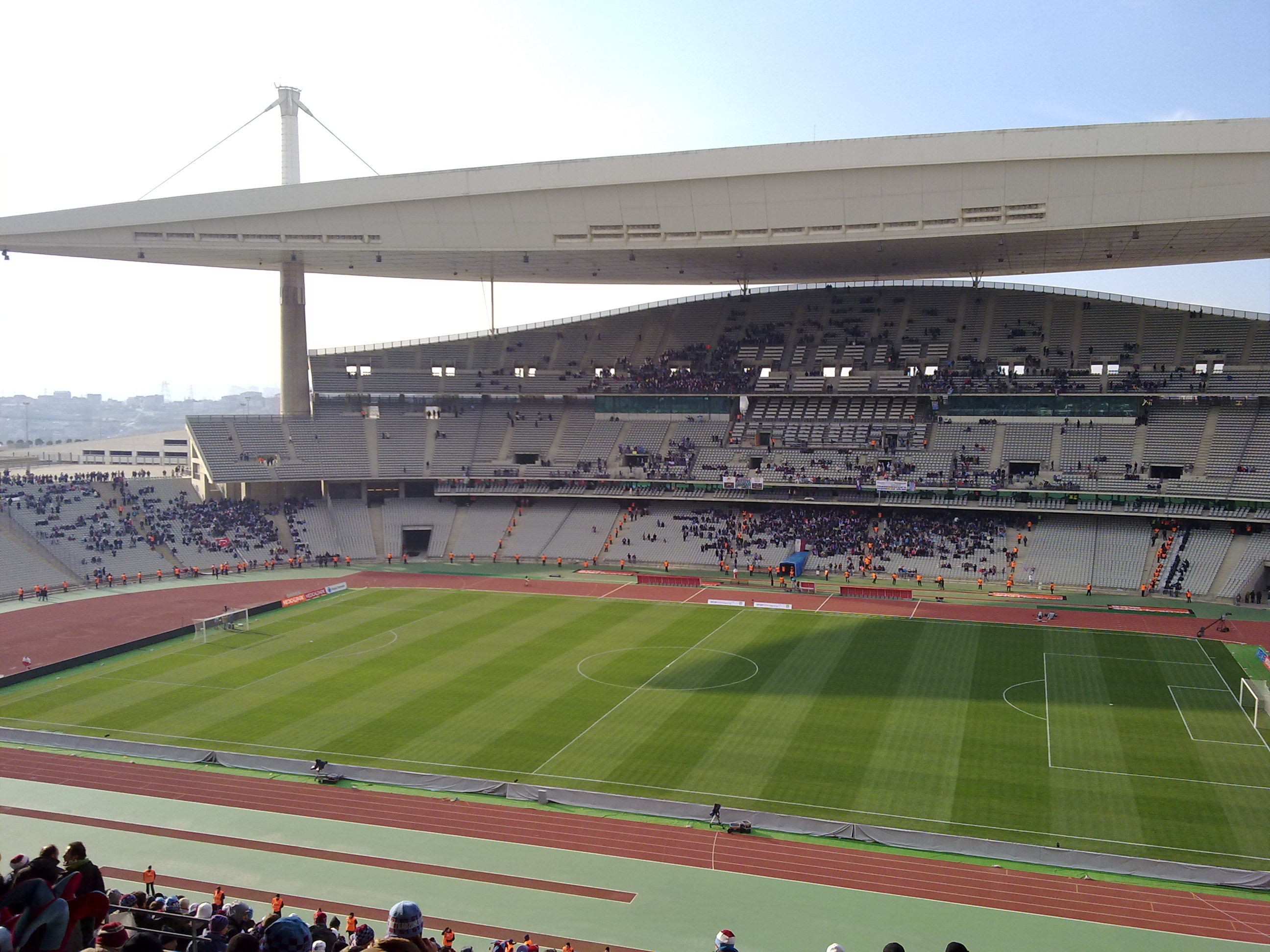
Interior of Atatürk Olympic Stadium.

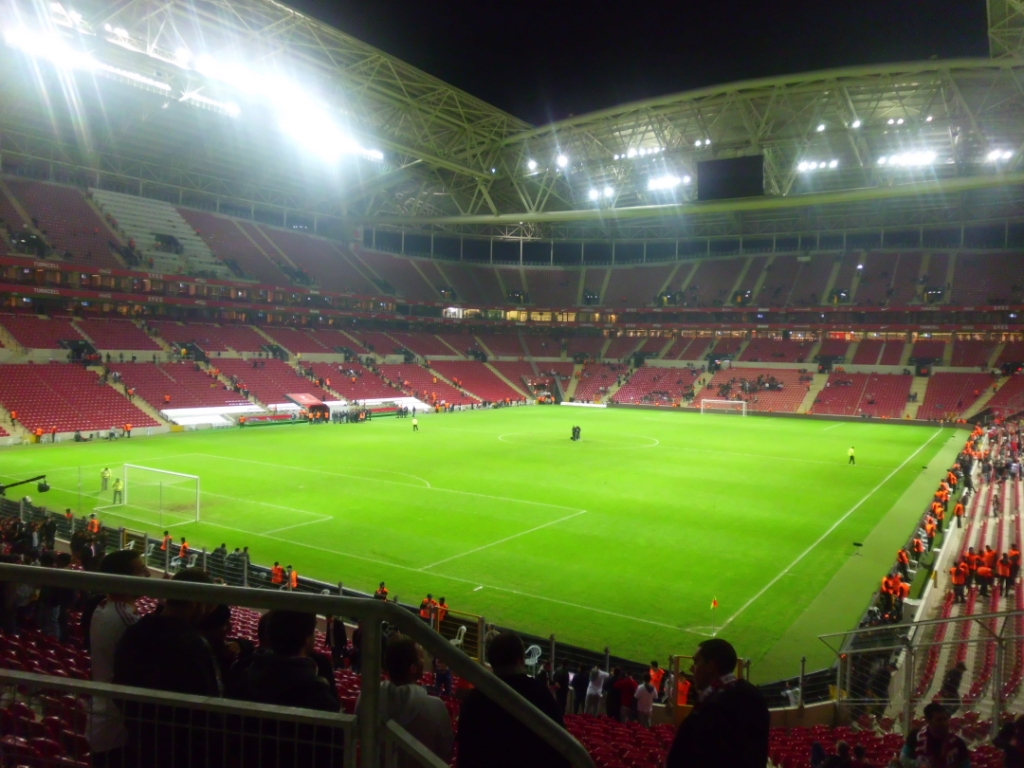
Türk Telekom Arena Stadium has the capacity to host 52,652 spectators during football games.

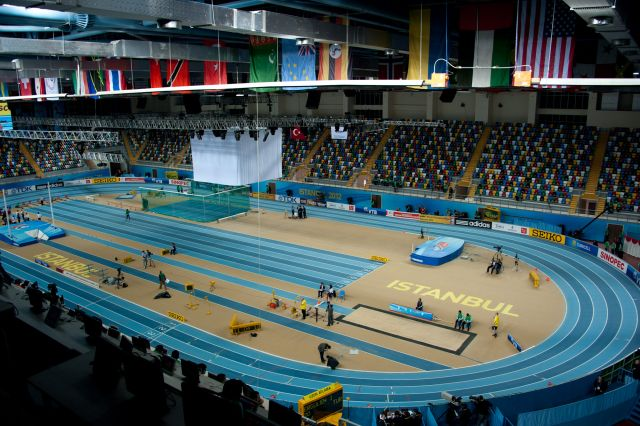
The interior of the Atakoy Athletics Arena

Istanbul hosted the knockout stage of the 2010 Basketball World Championship as well as the final. Istanbul was chosen as the European Capital of Sports for 2012. The 2011 WTA Tour Championships and 2012 Euroleague Final Four will be hosted in Istanbul. The Abdi İpekçi Arena hosted the Final of EuroBasket 2001, and was also the venue for the 1992 Euroleague Final Four. The former venue also hosted 2004 Eurovision Song Contest.

=== Venues ===
Venues would have been located in four zones and seven clusters around the city. The Olympic City Zone on the European side and the Olympic City Cluster would have included Atatürk Olympic Stadium and would have been home to the Olympic Village, with the Esenler Cluster of facilities just west of the main stadiums. The Coastal Zone along the Sea of Marmara would have included the Ataköy Cluster around Ataköy Athletics Arena and the Sinan Erdem Dome, while the Old City Cluster would have included cycle and triathlon facilities. The Bosporus zone would have had the Taksim Cluster on the European side and the Port Cluster on the Asian side, including Şükrü Saracoğlu Stadium. The final zone was the Forest Zone around Belgrade Forest in the north part of the European Side, where facilities would have included archery, volleyball, and rowing.

Türk Telekom Arena, Atatürk Olympic Stadium and Şükrü Saracoğlu Stadium, which were built or renovated in the first decade of the 21st century, are three UEFA Elite Stadiums in Istanbul. Atatürk Olympic Stadium hosted UEFA Champions League Final in 2005 and Şükrü Saracoğlu Stadium hosted the UEFA Cup Final in 2009. There are also plans to construct a temporary stadium which would have been used for the opening and closing ceremonies as well as for marathons.

Fenerbahçe International Sports Complex Ülker Sports Arena, the newest multi-purpose indoor arena in Istanbul, opened on January 25, 2012, with the inaugural Fenerbahçe-EA7 Emporio Armani basketball match of the Euroleague 2011-12 Top 16. In 2012, Sinan Erdem Dome hosted the 2011–12 Euroleague Final Four matches and the final phase of the 2010 FIBA World Championship.

==== Olympic City Cluster ====
- Atatürk Olympic Stadium – Athletics (track and field), Modern Pentathlon
- National Arena – Gymnastics
- Olympic Training Centre (Planned) – Boxing, Judo, Wrestling, Badminton, Table Tennis
- Olympic Hockey Centre (Planned) – Hockey
- Olympic Tennis Centre (Planned) – Tennis
- Olympic Aquatic Centre – Aquatics (Swimming, Artistic Swimming)
- Olympic Diving Stadium – Diving
- Olympic Water Polo Stadium – Water Polo

==== Esenler Cluster ====
- National Equestrian Centre (Additional) – Equestrian
- Olympic Basketball Centre – Basketball
- Esenler Golf Club – Golf

==== Old City Cluster ====
- Abdi İpekçi Arena – Handball
- Altınkapı Park – Marathon, Race Walks, Cycling (Road)
- Altınkapı Marina – Aquatics (Swimming Marathon), Triathlon

==== Taksim Cluster ====
- Harbiye Congress Auditorium – Weightlifting
- BJK İnönü Stadium – Rugby

==== Port Cluster ====
- Bosphorus Stadium (Planned) - Opening & Closing Ceremonies, Marathon
- Bosphorus Archery Park – Archery
- Bosphorus Beach Volleyball Centre – Beach Volleyball
- Bosphorus Rowing Centre – Canoe Kayak (Sprint), Rowing, Swimming Marathon
- Şükrü Saracoğlu Stadium – Football

==== Ataköy Cluster ====
- Sinan Erdem Dome – Basketball
- Ataköy Athletics Arena – Fencing, Taekwondo
- Olympic Velodrome (Planned) – Cycling (Track)
- Ataköy Marina – Sailing

==== Forest Cluster ====
- National Shooting Centre – Shooting
- Belgrade Forest Cycle Park – Cycling (BMX), Cycling (Mountain Biking)
- Olympic Whitewater Stadium – Canoe Kayak (Slalom)
- Türk Telekom Arena – Football

==== Stand Alone Venues ====
- Ülker Sports Arena – Volleyball
- New Ankara Stadium – Football
- Centennial Atatürk Stadium – Football
- New Antalya Stadium – Football

=== Accommodations ===
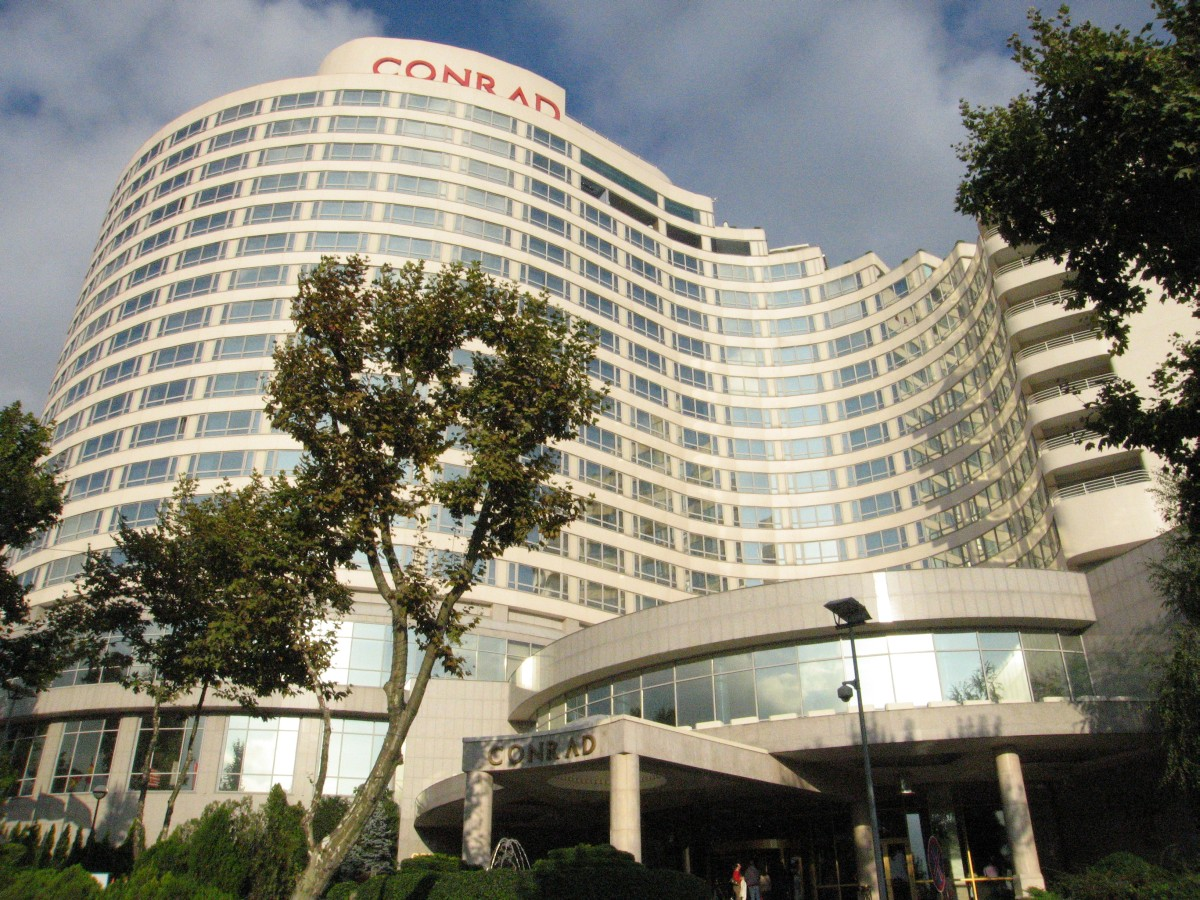
Conrad Istanbul Bosphorus

According to the data of the Association of the Touristic Hotels and Investors (TUROB) of the Republic of Turkey, at the end of 2010, 766 accommodation establishments of different categories in Istanbul (licensed by the Ministry of Tourism and Culture of Turkey and/or the municipality of Istanbul) had the total of 46,652 rooms and 93,299 beds. That capacity alone was sufficient to accommodate the annual volume of 10 million tourists.

At the same time, another 51 new hotels (of which 25 were 5-star hotels) were at various stages of development at the end of 2010, bringing another 9,512 rooms and 19,800 beds to the already existing capacity. With the completion of these new hotels, Istanbul's accommodation capacity will have reached, within a few years, the total of 817 hotels, 56,164 rooms and 113,990 beds.

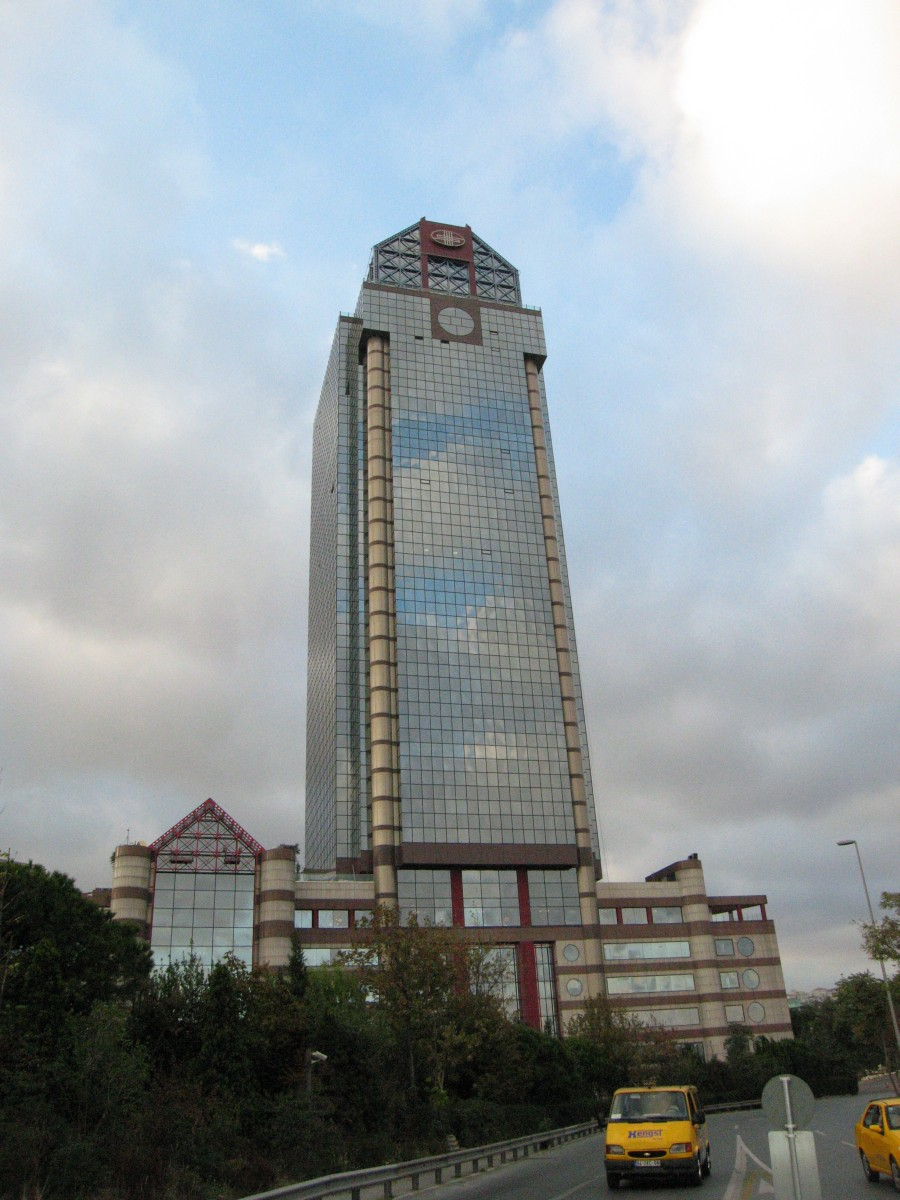
Ritz-Carlton Istanbul Hotel in Dolmabahçe.

As the ninth most visited city in the world and the ninth most popular congress destination in the world, Istanbul is also the location for a number of international hotel chains, hosting, as of September 2015, 106 operating international chain hotels, with further 31 such hotels scheduled to open before late 2017. In 2013, Istanbul was selected the best holiday destination in Europe.

=== Logo ===
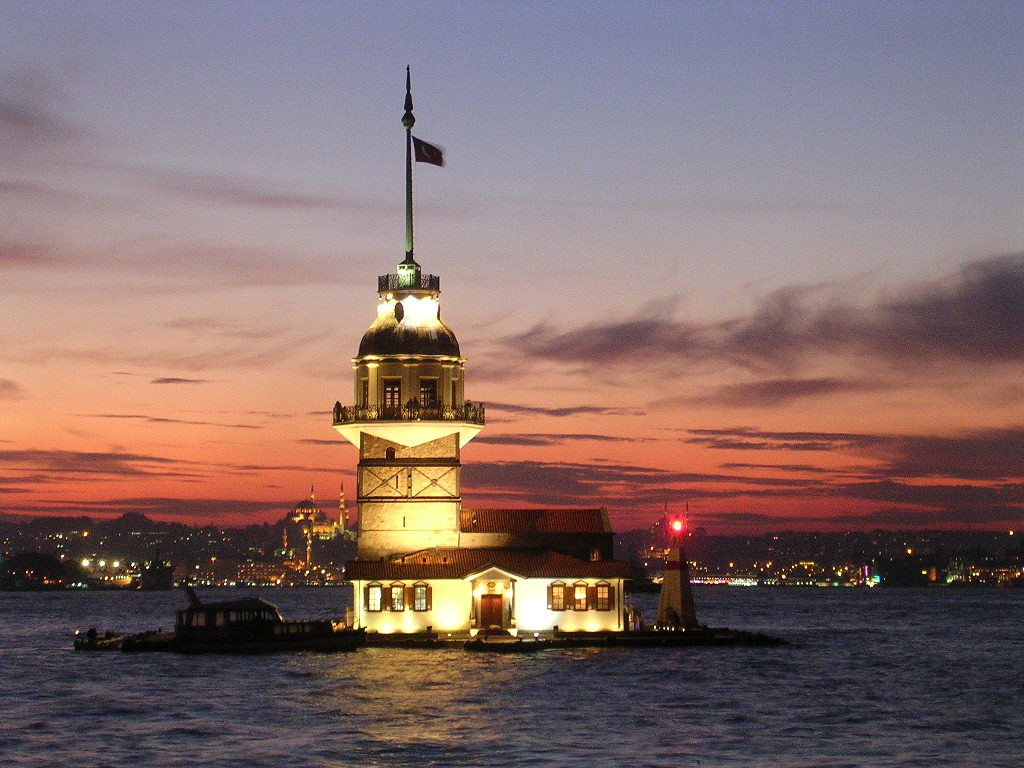
The Maiden's Tower is featured in the bid's logo

Istanbul 2020's official bid logo was revealed by Prime Minister Recep Tayyip Erdogan on July 22, 2012, after an online voting process between five potential logos. The logo combines the outline of a tulip, a traditional symbol of the city, with elements of the Istanbul skyline centered around the Maiden's Tower. The top part represents the European side of the city, while the bottom reflects the Asian side, which are divided by the Bosporus. The colors are orange, which reflects the color of sunset in the city, and turquoise, which is connected to Turkish culture.

=== Bid sponsors ===
- Digiturk
- Doğuş Holding / Garanti
- Koç Holding / Yapı Kredi
- Sabancı Holding / Akbank
- Turkcell
- Turkish Airlines
- Yıldız Holding / Ülker

== See also ==
- Turkey at the Olympics
