= Tokyo bid for the 2020 Summer Olympics =

Bid for the 2020 Summer Olympics

Bids for the 2020 Summer Olympics and Paralympics
Overview
- Games of the XXXII Olympiad; XVI Paralympic Games
- Winner: Tokyo; Runner-up: Istanbul; Shortlist: Madrid

Details
- City: Tokyo, Japan
- Chair: Shintaro Ishihara
- NOC: Japanese Olympic Committee (JOC)

Previous Games hosted
- 1964 Summer Olympics; Bid for 2016

Decision
- Result: Winner (60 votes)

Tokyo 2020 (東京 2020, Tōkyō Nisen-Nijū) was a successful bid for the 2020 Summer Olympics by the city of Tokyo and the Japanese Olympic Committee. On September 7, 2013 at the 125th IOC Session in Buenos Aires, Tokyo won their bid to host the games. Tokyo previously hosted the 1964 Summer Olympics. On August 3, 2016 it was reported that the IOC approved the addition of five sports to the program of the 2020 Olympics including the return of baseball and softball. The games were postponed from July 24, 2020, to the subsequent year as a result of the COVID-19 pandemic.

== History ==
Skyline of Shinjuku, Tokyo. Mount Fuji can be seen in the background

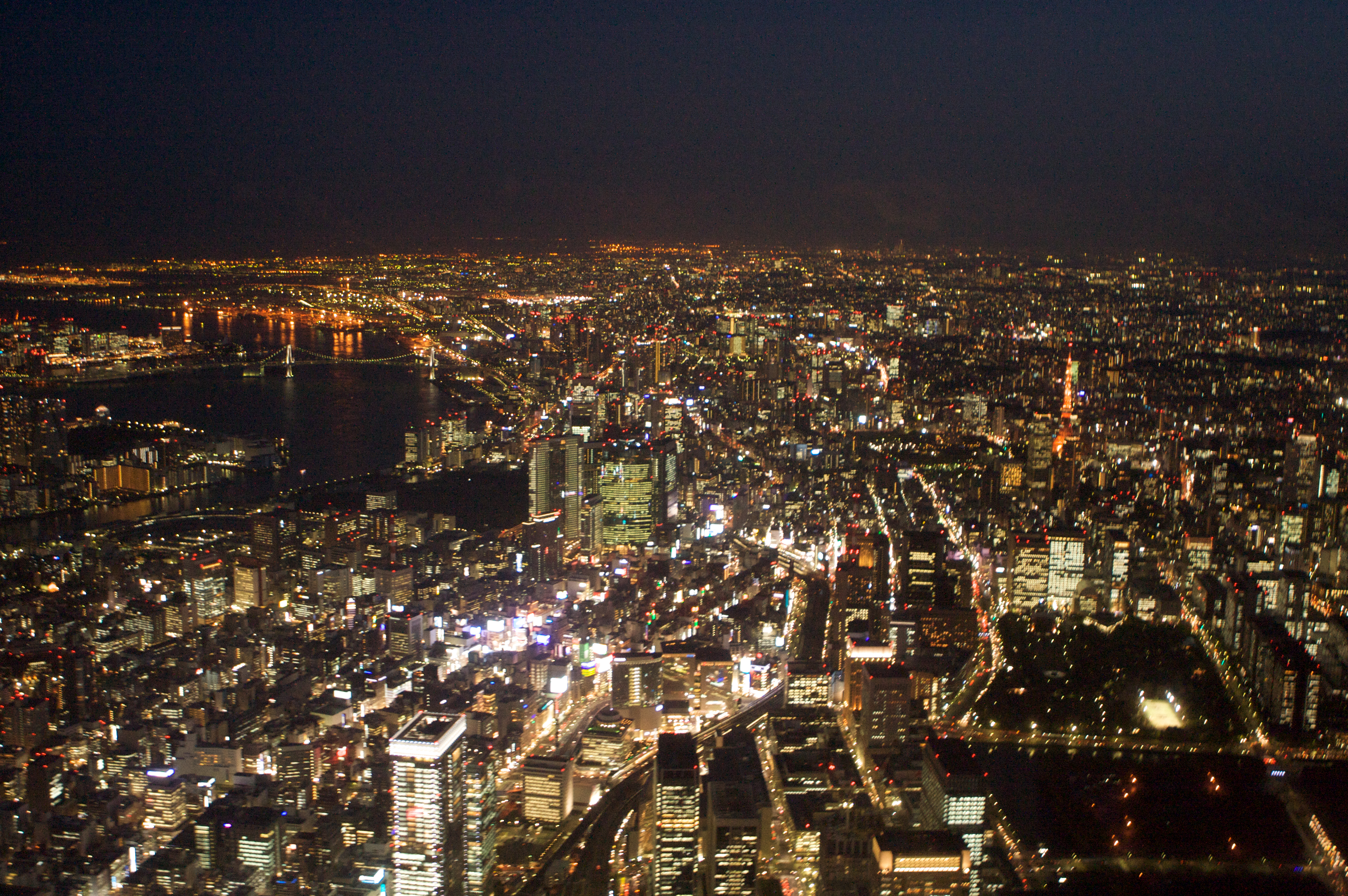
Night view of Tokyo

=== Applicant City phase ===
Tokyo was selected by the Japanese Olympic Committee on July 16, 2011 as Japan's bidding city for the 2020 Games. The city moved forward with its bid following the March 2011 earthquake and tsunami which affected much of eastern Japan. Prior to Tokyo's selection by the Japanese Olympic Committee, Hiroshima expressed interest in hosting but withdrew their plans to bid.

On September 7, 2011, the Japanese Olympic Committee announced that Tokyo governor Shintaro Ishihara will be chairman of the Tokyo 2020 bid committee. The bid committee held their first meeting shortly after. Towards the end of November 2011, the Tokyo 2020 Council was established. It is an advisory board that comprises 64 members, including Prime Minister Yoshihiko Noda, who is the top advisor on the council. Tokyo 2020 revealed their bid logo on November 30, 2011. Tokyo's 2020 bid would have a budget of $75 million, which is half the amount of their previous 2016 bid, which had a $150 million budget. The president of the Japanese Olympic Committee, Tsunekazu Takeda, stated in April 2012 that hosting the games could generate $2 billion for Tokyo.

In early December 2011, Japan's House of Representatives and House of Councillors passed a resolution giving Tokyo's bid their full support and cooperation. This decision also stated that hosting the games would be beneficial to Japan and would be a positive step forward following the recent earthquake and tsunami that Japan experienced earlier in 2011. The Cabinet followed by giving the bid its support. The bid had full backing of the government.

In January 2012 polls suggested that nearly 66% of the country supports the bid.

Tokyo 2020 appointed Yuko Arakida as its sports director in February 2012. Ayano Egami who won a silver medal in synchronized swimming at the 2000 Summer Olympics will serve as head of online and social media for the bid.

In April 2012, Tokyo 2020 appointed Tokuaki Suzuki, as the bid's communications director. Suzuki previously served as Competitions Director of the Asian Football Confederation.

=== Candidate City phase ===
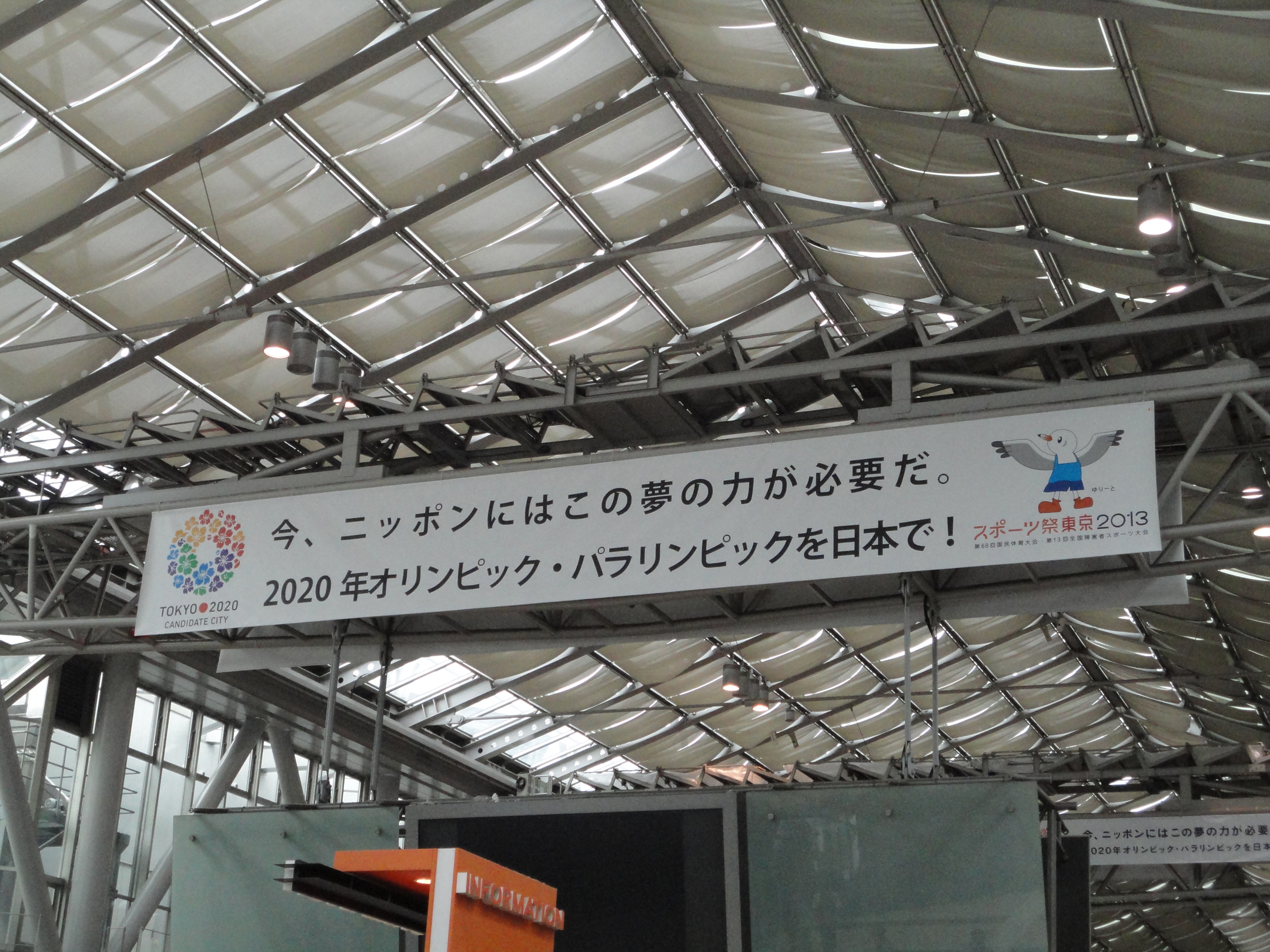
Sign promoting the bid at Tokyo Big Sight.

On May 23, 2012, the IOC selected Tokyo as a Candidate City for the 2020 Summer Olympics.

In June 2012 a study was conducted that found that hosting the 2020 Olympic Games in Tokyo could create over 150,000 jobs. In July 2012, the bid launched their "Discover Tomorrow" slogan. In November, a survey revealed that 67% of Tokyo's population supported Tokyo's Olympic bid.

Also in November 2012, the new design for the redeveloped National Olympic Stadium was revealed. The venue will be used for the 2019 Rugby World Cup. Tokyo 2020 submitted their candidature file to the IOC on January 7, 2013.

A poll in January 2013 found that 73% of Tokyo residents were in favor of the bid. Another poll found that 78% of Japanese surveyed supported bringing the games to Tokyo. This result showed an increase in support compared to earlier polls. A poll carried out by Yomiuri Shimbun found that 83% of the country supported the bid. Tokyo's previous bid for the 2016 Games had lower public support with one poll indicating that 56% of residents supported the 2016 bid. The IOC Evaluation Commission visited Tokyo from March 4 to March 7, 2013.

In April 2013, the Tokyo 2020 chairman, Governor Naoki Inose, created controversy when he made a comment that was seen as a criticism of Istanbul and their bid for the 2020 Olympics. Inose said, “Well, compare the two countries where they have yet to build infrastructure, very sophisticated facilities. So from time to time, like Brazil, I think it’s good to have a venue for the first time. But Islamic countries, the only thing they share in common is Allah and they are fighting with each other and they have classes.” Criticizing rival bids are forbidden under IOC rules. Following Inose's statement, Tokyo 2020 made a statement saying that they "have the utmost respect for all candidate cities and have always taken pride in bidding in a spirit based on the Olympic values of excellence, respect and friendship.” Inose apologized for his comments a few days later and stated that he was "fully committed" to respecting IOC rules.

At the Association of National Olympic Committees Extraordinary General Assembly in June 2013, Tokyo 2020 stressed the compactness of their bid. 85% of the competition venues would be within 8 km (5.0 mi) of the Olympic Village. Two anonymous sources within the IOC stated that Tokyo is the favorite to win their Olympic bid over Istanbul and Madrid provided no major mistakes were made before the IOC vote. The safe and secure nature of Tokyo was seen as a major factor giving the Tokyo bid an advantage. Istanbul had already seen large anti-government protests while Madrid's bid was said to have been affected by Spain's economic crisis.

The 2020 IOC Evaluation Commission Report on the Candidate Cities for the 2020 Summer Olympics was released on June 25. Tokyo 2020 gave a presentation of their bid to the IOC at an Extraordinary session in Lausanne in July 2013.

In August 2013, Naoki Inose stated that the 2011 nuclear accident at the Fukushima nuclear power plant would not pose a threat to Tokyo's ability to host the Olympic Games. Inose stated that "the water in Tokyo is safe, and we have released this data on our website" and that "The radiation levels are no different than in London or Paris." A letter of assurance over the issue was later sent to the IOC members.

==== 125th IOC Session ====
Prior to the host city election, Brazilian footballer Zico endorsed Tokyo's bid for the 2020 Summer Olympics.

Tokyo was elected as the host city at the 125th IOC Session in Buenos Aires, Argentina.

2020 Summer Olympics host city election
City	Team	Round 1	Runoff	Round 2
Tokyo	Japan	42	—	60
Istanbul	Turkey	26	49	36
Madrid	Spain	26	45	—

== Previous bids ==
Tokyo recently bid for the 2016 Summer Olympics but lost to Rio de Janeiro. Tokyo's first Olympic bid was for the 1940 Summer Olympics. The city successfully secured a bid; however, the games were relocated to Helsinki due to the Second Sino-Japanese War and were ultimately cancelled as a result of World War II. They later bid for the 1960 Summer Olympics and lost to Rome. Tokyo made a successful bid for the 1964 Summer Olympics and Tokyo became the first Asian city to host the Olympic Games.

Tokyo's successful 2020 bid is the city's fifth bid for the games, making it the fourth city to host the Summer Olympics two times. Paris, Los Angeles and Athens have hosted the games twice, with London hosting for a third time in 2012. With Tokyo's selection as host of the 2020 games, it marks the fourth Olympic Game to be held in Japan.

=== Previous bids from other Japanese cities ===
Osaka bid to host the 2008 Olympics but lost to Beijing. Nagoya bid for the 1988 Summer Olympics and lost to Seoul.

Japan has also made bids for the Winter Olympics. Sapporo was awarded the 1940 Winter Olympics but it was cancelled due to World War II. They later bid for the 1968 Winter Olympics but lost to Grenoble. Sapporo successfully bid for the 1972 Winter Olympics, which marked the first Winter Olympic game held in Asia. They later made a bid for the 1984 Winter Olympics but lost to Sarajevo.

Nagano successfully bid to host the 1998 Winter Olympics, which marked the second Winter Olympic Games celebrated in Asia.

== Venues ==
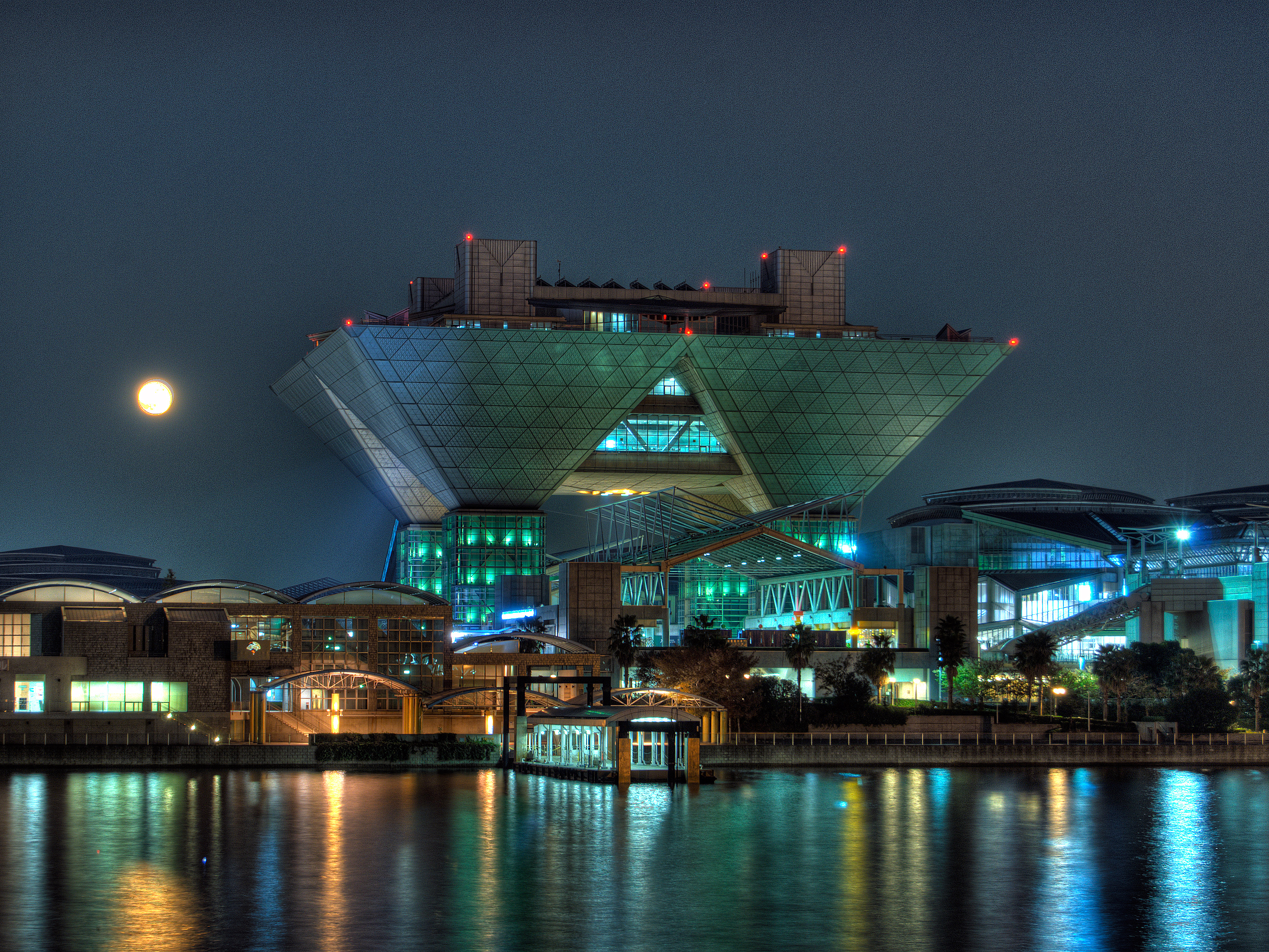
The Tokyo Big Sight exhibition center would be used as the International Broadcast Center

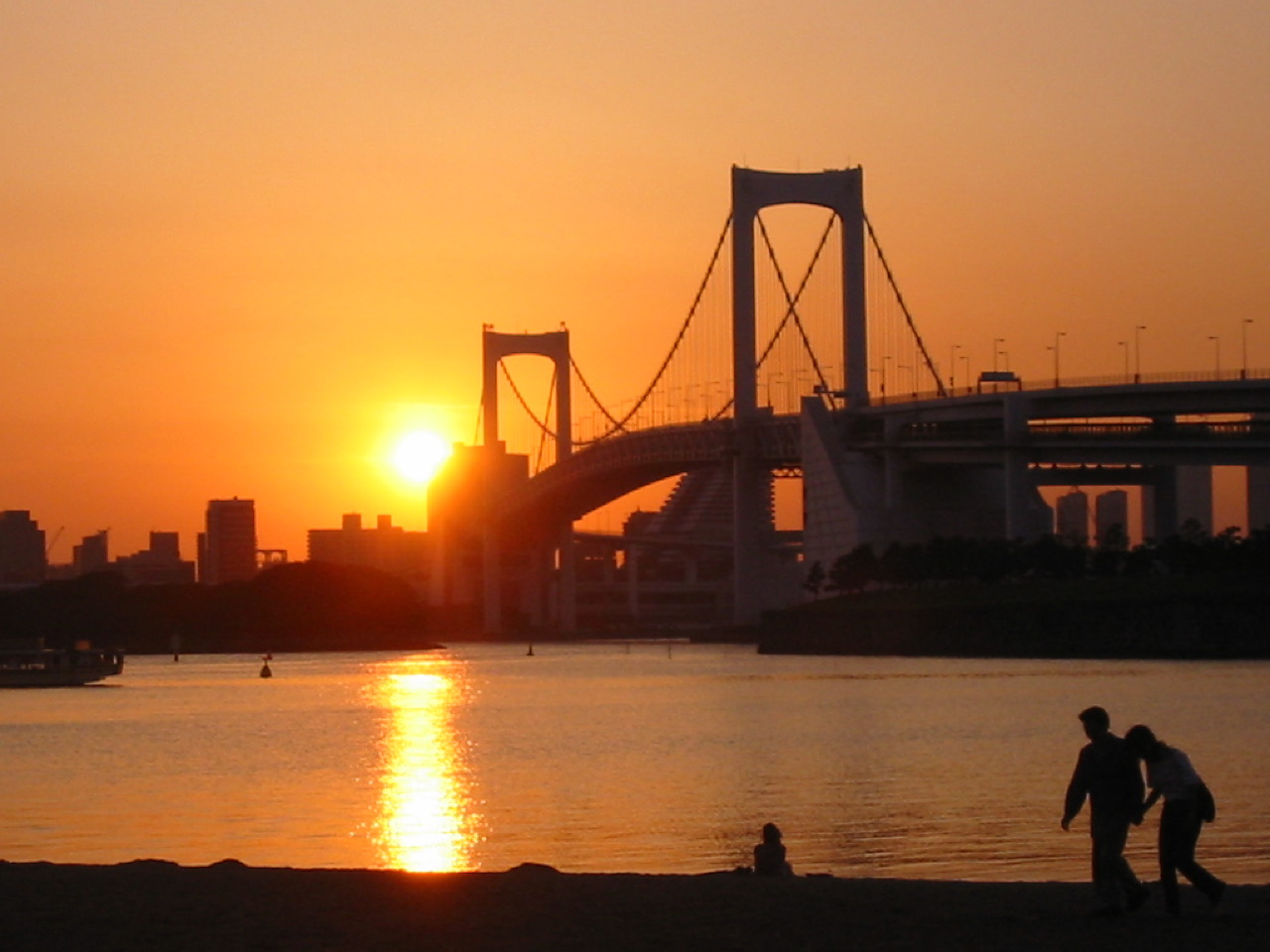
View of the Rainbow Bridge from Odaiba Marine Park

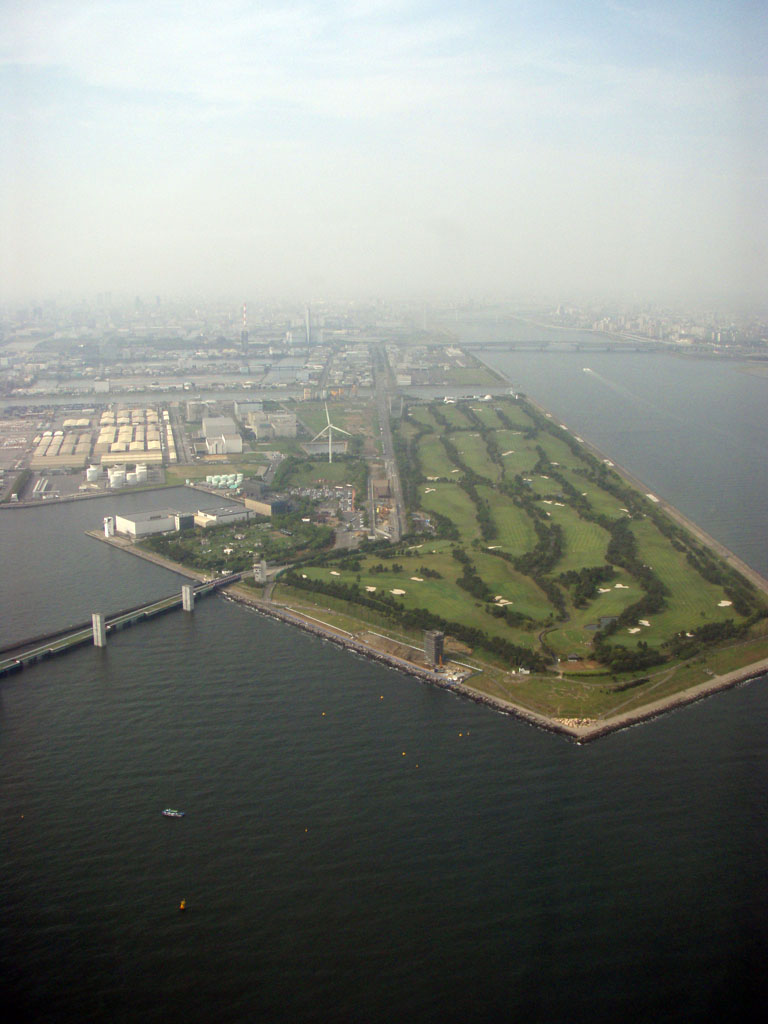
The Wakasu Golf Links and Wakasu Olympic Marina is where Golf and Sailing would be held

It was confirmed in February 2012 that the National Olympic Stadium in Tokyo would receive a $1 billion upgrade and full-scale reconstruction for the 2019 Rugby World Cup as well as the 2020 Olympics. As a result, a design competition for the new stadium was launched. In November 2012 the Japan Sport Council announced that out of 46 finalists, Zaha Hadid Architects was awarded the design for the new stadium. Plans include dismantling the original stadium, and expanding the capacity from 50,000 to a modern Olympic capacity of about 80,000.

The possibility of renovating the National Olympic Stadium had been previously discussed. Following a renovation, the venue would host the opening and closing ceremonies as well as track and field events. Renovating the stadium would reduce costs of organizing the games in the event that Tokyo wins their bid. In their 2016 bid, Tokyo proposed building a new Olympic Stadium on the Tokyo Bay waterfront near the Olympic Village, which would have cost $1.3 billion.

=== Inside 8 km from Olympic Village ===
- New National Olympic Stadium – opening and closing ceremonies, Athletics, Football (final) and Rugby
- Yoyogi National Stadium - Handball
- Tokyo Metropolitan Gymnasium - Table tennis
- Nippon Budokan - Judo
- Tokyo International Forum - Weight Lifting
- Imperial Palace Garden - Cycling (Road)
- Kokugikan Arena - Boxing
- Kasai Slalom Course - Canoe Kayak (slalom)
- Wakasu Golf Links - Golf
- Wakasu Olympic Marina - Sailing
- Seaside Park Hockey Stadium - Hockey
- Tokyo Tatsumi International Swimming Center - Aquatics (swimming, diving, waterpolo and synchronised swimming)
- Dream Island Stadium - Equestrian (jumping, dressage and eventing)
- Dream Island Archery Field - Archery
- Youth Plaza Arena A - Badminton
- Youth Plaza Arena B - Basketball
- Differ Ariake Arena - Volleyball
- Olympic Velodrome - Cycling (track)
- Olympic BMX Course - Cycling (BMX)
- Olympic Gymnastic Centre - Gymnastics (artistic, rhythmic and trampoline)
- Ariake Coliseum - Tennis
- Odaiba Marine Park - Triathlon and Aquatics (marathon swimming)
- Shiokaze Park - Beach Volleyball
- Tokyo Big Sight Hall B - Fencing and Taekwondo
- Sea Forest Cross-Country Course - Equestrian (eventing)
- Sea Forest Waterway - Rowing and Canoe Kayak (sprint)
- Sea Forest - Mountain Bike Course - Cycling (mountain bike)

=== Outside of 8 km from Olympic Village ===
- Asaka Shooting Range - Shooting
- Musashino Forest Modern Pentathlon Centre - Modern Pentathlon (fencing, swimming)
- Tokyo Stadium - Football and Modern Pentathlon (riding, running, shooting)

=== Orther Village ===
- Imperial Hotel, Tokyo - IOC
- Harumi Futo - Olympic Village
- Tokyo Big Sight - Media Press Center, International Broadcast Center

=== Football venues ===
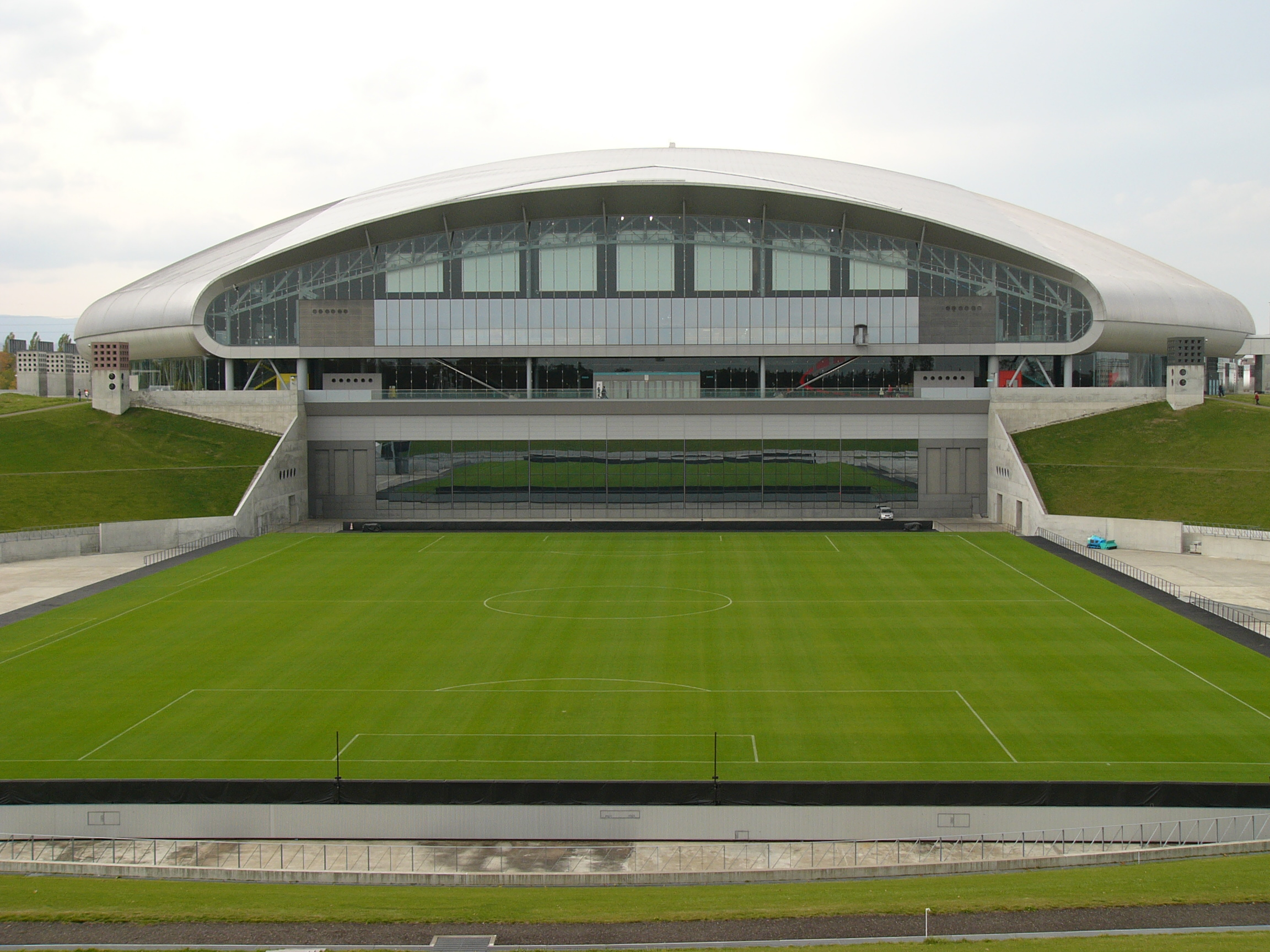
The Sapporo Dome in Sapporo

- New National Olympic Stadium
- Tokyo Stadium
- International Stadium Yokohama
- Saitama Stadium
- Sapporo Dome
- Miyagi Stadium

== Tokyo 2020 Bid Committee ==
=== Executive board ===
- President - Tsunekazu Takeda (president, Japanese Olympic Committee)

=== Council ===
- Chairman - Naoki Inose (Governor of Tokyo)
- Vice Chairman - Yoshiro Mori (honorary chairman, Japan Sports Association) (former prime minister of Japan)
- Vice Chairman - Tsunekazu Takeda (president, Japanese Olympic Committee)
- Vice Chairman - Hiromasa Yonekura (chairman, Japan Business Federation)
- Vice Chairman - Tadashi Okamura (chairman, Japan Chamber of Commerce and Industry)
- Secretary General - Kazuo Ogura (former president, Japan Foundation) (former ambassadors of Japan to France)
- Member - Yasushi Akimoto (Japanese television writer, lyricist)
- Member - Tadao Ando (architect)
- Member - Chiharu Igaya (honorary member of IOC)
- Member - Shunichiro Okano (honorary member of IOC)
- Member - Saburō Kawabuchi (supreme adviser, Japan Football Association)
- Member - Yōhei Sasakawa (chairman, The Nippon Foundation)
- Member - Yūhei Satō (Governor of Fukushima Prefecture)
- Member - Hisako Higuchi (president, Japan Ladies' Professional Golf Association)
- Member - Yoshihiro Murai (Governor of Miyagi Prefecture)
- Member - Takuya Tasso (Governor of Iwate Prefecture)
- Member - Keiji Yamada (president, National Governors' Association)
- Supreme Advisor - Shinzō Abe (Prime Minister of Japan)
- Supreme Advisor - Bunmei Ibuki (Speaker of the Japanese House of Representatives)
- Supreme Advisor - Kenji Hirata (President of the House of Councillors)
- Special Advisor - Taro Aso (chairman of Parliamentary Caucus for Sport) (former prime minister of Japan)
- Special Advisor - Yukio Hatoyama (chairman of Parliamentary Caucus for Tokyo 2020 Bid Promotion) (former prime minister of Japan)

== See also ==
- Japan at the Olympics
