= Alejandro Blanco =

President of the Spanish Olympic Committee

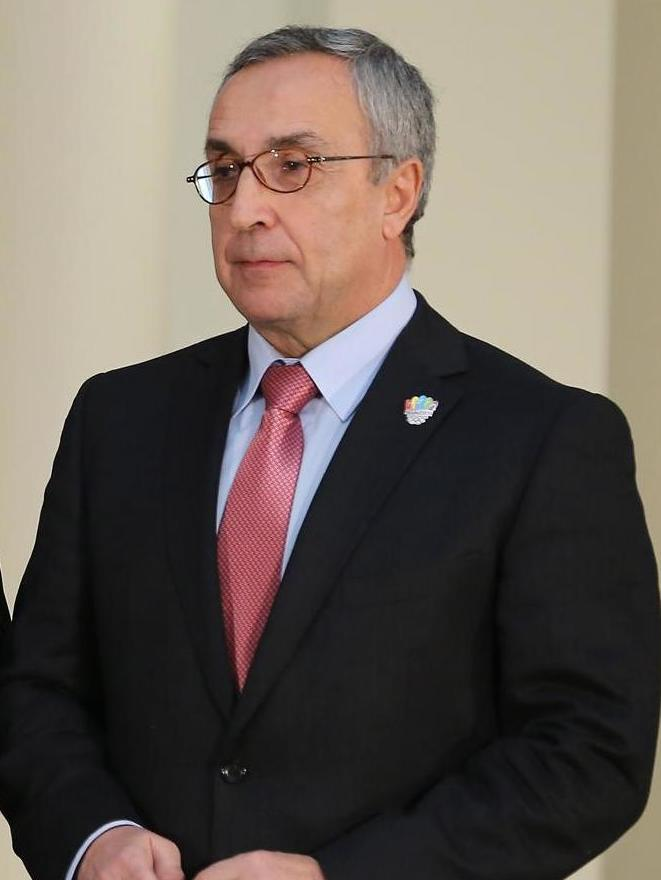
Alejandro Blanco (2013).

Alejandro Blanco Bravo (born 9 October 1950 in Orense) is the current President of the Spanish Olympic Committee.

On September 8, 2011, it was announced that he would preside Madrid's bid to host the 2020 Summer Olympics.

Preceded by José María Echevarría y Arteche	President of the Spanish Olympic Committee; 2005-present	Succeeded by incumbent
