= Spanish Olympic Committee =

- Country: Spain
- Code: ESP
- Created: 1912
- Recognized: 1912
- Continental Association: EOC
- Headquarters: Madrid, Spain
- President: Alejandro Blanco Bravo
- Secretary General: Victoria Cabezas Alvarez
- Website: www.coe.es

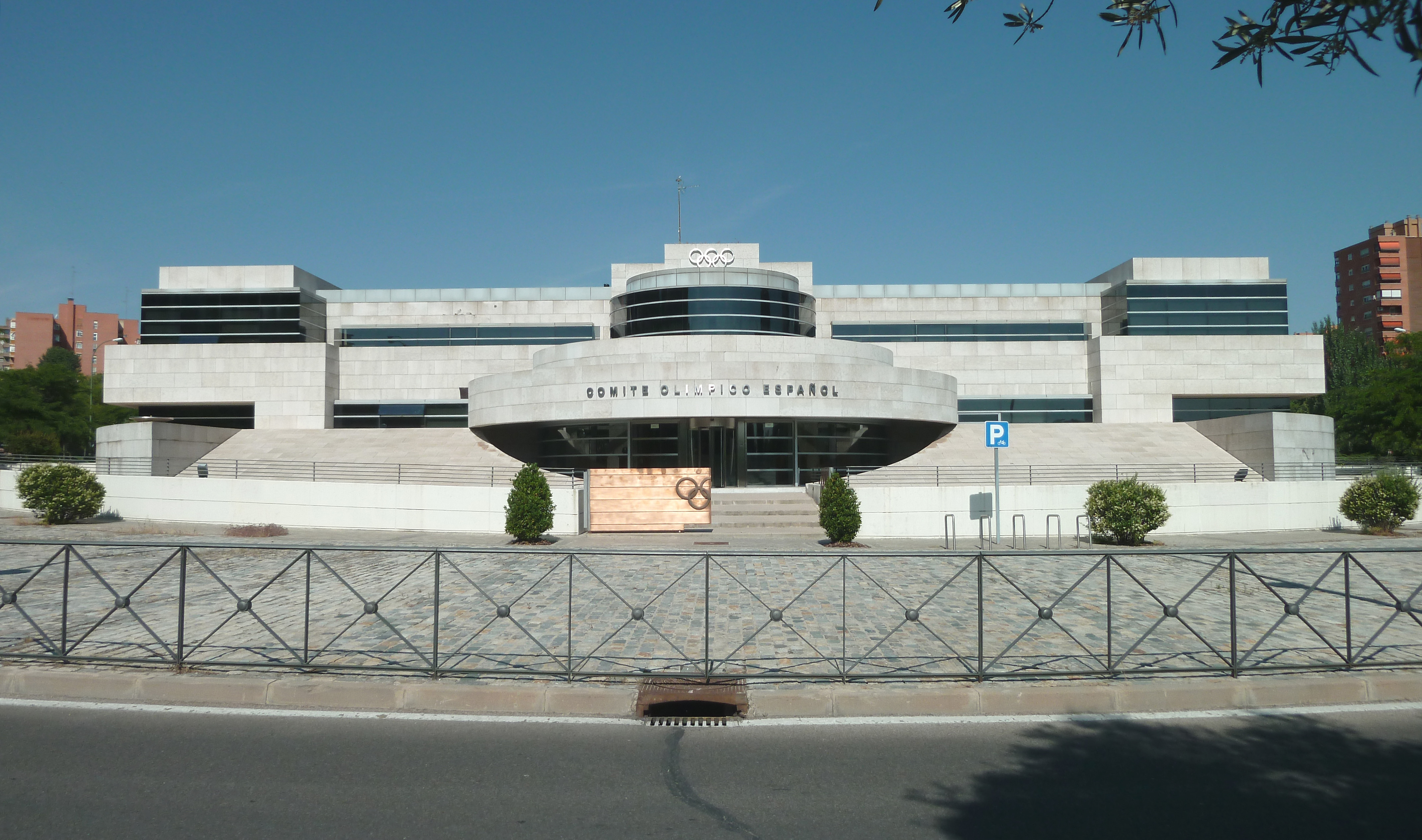
Spanish Olympic Committee headquarters, in Madrid.

The Spanish Olympic Committee (Spanish: Comité Olímpico Español, COE; IOC Code: ESP) is the responsible National Olympic Committee for Spain's participation in the Olympic Games. Members of the committee are 35 sports federations, which elect the Executive Council composed of the president and 23 members.

== History ==
The Spanish Olympic Committee was founded on November 23, 1912, and refounded on January 11, 1924, in Barcelona.

== Presidents ==
President	Term
Don Gonzalo de Figueroa y Torres, 1st Marquess of Villamejor	1912–1921
Don Santiago Güell y López, Baron of Güell	1924–1926
Don Eusebio López y Díaz de Quijano, Marquess of Lamadrid	1926–1931
Don Santiago Güell y López, Baron of Güell	1931–1932
Augusto Pi Suñer	1932–1936
Don José Moscardó Ituarte, Count of Alcázar de Toledo	1941–1956
José Antonio Elola-Olaso	1956–1967
Don Juan Antonio Samaranch Torelló, 1st Marquess of Samaranch	1967–1970
Juan Gich Bech de Careda	1970–1975
Tomás Pelayo Ros	1975–1976
Benito Castejón Paz	1976–1980
Jesús Hermida Cebreiro	1980–1983
Romá Cuyás Sol	1983–1984
Don Alfonso de Borbón y Dampierre, Duke of Cádiz	1984–1987
Carlos Ferrer Salat	1987–1998
Don Alfredo Goyeneche Moreno, Count of Guaqui	1998–2002
José María Echevarría y Arteche	2002–2005
Alejandro Blanco Bravo	2005–present

== Executive committee ==
The committee of the COE is represented by:

- President: Alejandro Blanco Bravo
- Vice Presidents: Isabel Fernández Gutiérrez, Francisco Vidal Blázquez García, Isabel García Sanz, Marco Antonio Rioja Pérez
- Secretary General: Victoria Cabezas Alvarez
- IOC Members: Infanta Pilar, Duchess of Badajoz, Marisol Casado Estupiñán, Pau Gasol, Juan Antonio Samaranch Salisachs
- Treasurer: Víctor Gaspar Sánchez Naranjo
- Members of Representatives of Olympic Sports Federations: Jesús Carballo Martínez, Jesús Castellanos Pueblas, Santiago Deó Valera, Luis Gonzaga Escauriaza Barreiro, José Hidalgo Martín, José Luis López Cerrón, José María Peus España, Francisco Javier Revuelta del Peral, Juan José Román Mangas
- Members of Representatives of Non-Olympic Sports Federations Manuel Aviñó Roger, Luis Vañó Martínez, Luis Angel Vegas Herrera
- Representative of Olympic Sport: Ignacio Sola Cortabarría

== Member federations ==
The Spanish National Federations are the organizations that coordinate all aspects of their individual sports. They are responsible for training, competition and development of their sports. There are currently 33 Olympic Summer and two Winter Sport Federations in Spain.

National Federation	Summer or Winter	Headquarters
Royal Spanish Archery Federation	Summer	Madrid
Royal Spanish Athletics Federation	Summer	Madrid
Spanish Badminton Federation	Summer	Madrid
Spanish Basketball Federation	Summer	Madrid
Royal Spanish Baseball and Softball Federation	Summer	Madrid
Spanish Boxing Federation	Summer	Madrid
Royal Spanish Canoe Federation	Summer	Madrid
Royal Spanish Cycling Federation	Summer	Madrid
Royal Spanish Equestrian Federation	Summer	Madrid
Royal Spanish Fencing Federation	Summer	Madrid
Royal Spanish Football Federation	Summer	Las Rozas de Madrid
Royal Spanish Golf Federation	Summer	Madrid
Royal Spanish Federation of Gymnastics	Summer	Madrid
Royal Spanish Handball Federation	Summer	Madrid
Royal Spanish Hockey Federation	Summer	Madrid
Spanish Ice Sports Federation	Winter	Barcelona
Royal Spanish Judo Federation	Summer	Madrid
Spanish Karate Federation	Summer	Madrid
Spanish Modern Pentathlon Federation	Summer	Barcelona
Spanish Federation for Mountain and Climbing Sports	Summer	Barcelona
Spanish Roller Sports Federation	Summer	Madrid
Spanish Rowing Federation	Summer	Madrid
Spanish Rugby Federation	Summer	Madrid
Royal Spanish Sailing Federation	Summer	Madrid
Royal Spanish Olympic Shooting Federation	Summer	Madrid
Spanish Surfing Federation	Summer	Ferrol, Galicia
Royal Spanish Swimming Federation	Summer	Madrid
Royal Spanish Table Tennis Federation	Summer	Madrid
Royal Spanish Taekwondo Federation	Summer	Alicante
Royal Spanish Tennis Federation	Summer	Barcelona
Spanish Triathlon Federation	Summer	Madrid
Royal Spanish Volleyball Federation	Summer	Madrid
Spanish Weightlifting Federation	Summer	Madrid
Royal Spanish Winter Sports Federation	Winter	San Sebastián de los Reyes, Madrid
Spanish Federation of Olympic Wrestling	Summer	Madrid

== See also ==
- Spain at the Olympics
