= LaQuan Smith =

American fashion designer (born 1988)

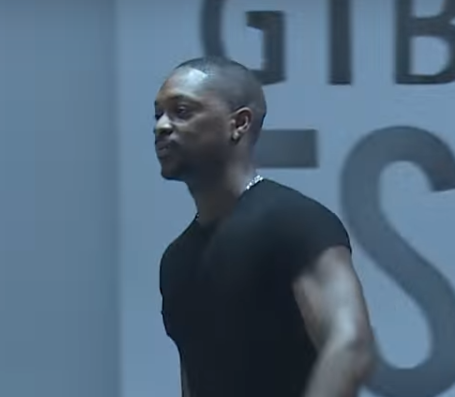
Smith in 2017 in Nigeria

LaQuan Smith (born August 30, 1988) is an American fashion designer and founder and chief executive officer of womenswear clothing brand LaQuan Smith, LLC. He is based in New York City.

== Early life ==
Smith was born on August 30, 1988, in Queens, New York. As he grew up, he developed a passion for fashion and design. He further developed his passion at the age of 13 when his grandmother passed on her old Singer sewing machine for him to use. From there, he began regularly designing and creating garments. In 2007, he graduated from Glasgow High School in Delaware. Shortly after, he began his career in fashion.

== Career ==
In 2005, Smith applied to Fashion Institute of Technology, as well as Parsons School of Design, but was not accepted. Smith then began interning at the New York magazine BlackBook in 2007, working for celebrity fashion stylist Elizabeth Sulcer. He would attend events by pretending to be a BlackBook editor. In 2008, he created his self-titled designer brand.

In February 2010, he made his New York Fashion Week debut at the Society of Illustrators headquarters in Upper East Side. The audience for Smith's 'Water Goddess' show included fashion press, buyers, and celebrities. Specifically, the Vogue editor-at-large Andre Leon Talley, Vogue style director Alexandra Kotur, Janice Combs, Misa Hylton, Justin Tranter, and lawyer L. Londell McMillan. He later presented a Spring-Summer Collection in September 2010.

Smith's collection for the 2011 New York Fashion Week was showcased in the Gramercy Ballroom at the Peninsula Hotel. The collection, titled 'A Story Book Path', was inspired by Marie Antoinette, Cruella De Vil, and Queen Elizabeth I. Notable guests included Andre Leon Talley, Diane von Furstenberg, George Malkemus, Sandra Bernhard, Lorenzo Martone, Marcus Samuelsson, and L. Londell McMillan. Models walking in the show included Cassie Ventura, Deborah Cox, Jaslene Gonzalez, Serena Williams, Rihanna, Kim Kardashian, Nicki Minaj, and Christina Milian.

For the February 2022 New York Fashion Week, Smith paid tribute to his mentor, Andre Leon Talley, by showcasing a glamour-styled event. The show featured Julia Fox and exhibited models wearing high-heels, red sequined dresses, faux fur corsets, cut-out frocks, gold leggings, miniskirts, and Lurex.

== Brand inspiration and reception ==
Since Smith was a child, he sought comfort in the female figures that have been present in his life. As a young gay man who was self-described as "very flamboyant,"growing up in the traditional social setting of Queens, New York proved to be a difficult experience. The young designer was often reminded of his differences in the form of teasing from his male peers. His grandfather, George A. Smith, disapproved of Smith's non-traditional interests, noting his desire for Smith to played football and after that not working out, "it was basketball, then a baseball glove." Luckily, not everyone in Smith's life shared the anti-design sentiment that he faced during his early life; many female friends around him served as a point of encouragement to keep pursuing his dream. Thus, he did not allow himself to be discouraged from working with clothing.

In fact, clothing design was such an integral part of Smith's life that the very first runway show he ever created debuted while Smith was still in middle school. Similarly, the women in his family had a large impact on his confidence as a designer and he largely credits them for much of his inspiration. That can be seen today in the fact that he continues to produce his clothing right in his hometown of Queens, New York. Smith, who learned to sew from his grandmother, took the female energy of empowerment that was given to him while growing up and channeled it into his creations. This is evident in every collection he presents where emphasis on highlighting the female body has become a signature through figure-hugging catsuits, tailored jackets, and revealing cut-out dresses which he reimagines each season in a multitude of fabrics. Smith's dedication and unique perspective on his craft paid off after receiving media coverage from his first celebrity client. While perusing a tabloid section in 2010, Smith was surprised to see Lady Gaga wearing a pair of his leggings. From there, his list of notable clientele has continued to grow and includes names such as Khloe Kardashian, Hailey Bieber, Kylie Jenner, Beyonce and most recently Vice-President and Presidential candidate Kamala Harris at the 2024 CBC dinner.
