= Martone (surname) =

Martone is a surname. Notable people with the surname include:

- Dave Martone (born 1970), Canadian guitarist and record producer
- Elaine Martone, American record producer
- Francesco Martone (born 1961), Italian politician
- Frederick J. Martone (born 1943), American jurist
- Lorenzo Martone (born 1979), entrepreneur in the fashion industry
- Mario Martone (born 1959), Italian filmmaker
- Michael Martone (born 1955), American author
- Michel Martone (born 1974), Italian jurist and academic
- Porter Martone (born 2006), Canadian ice hockey player
