= Marc Jacobs =

American fashion designer (born 1963)

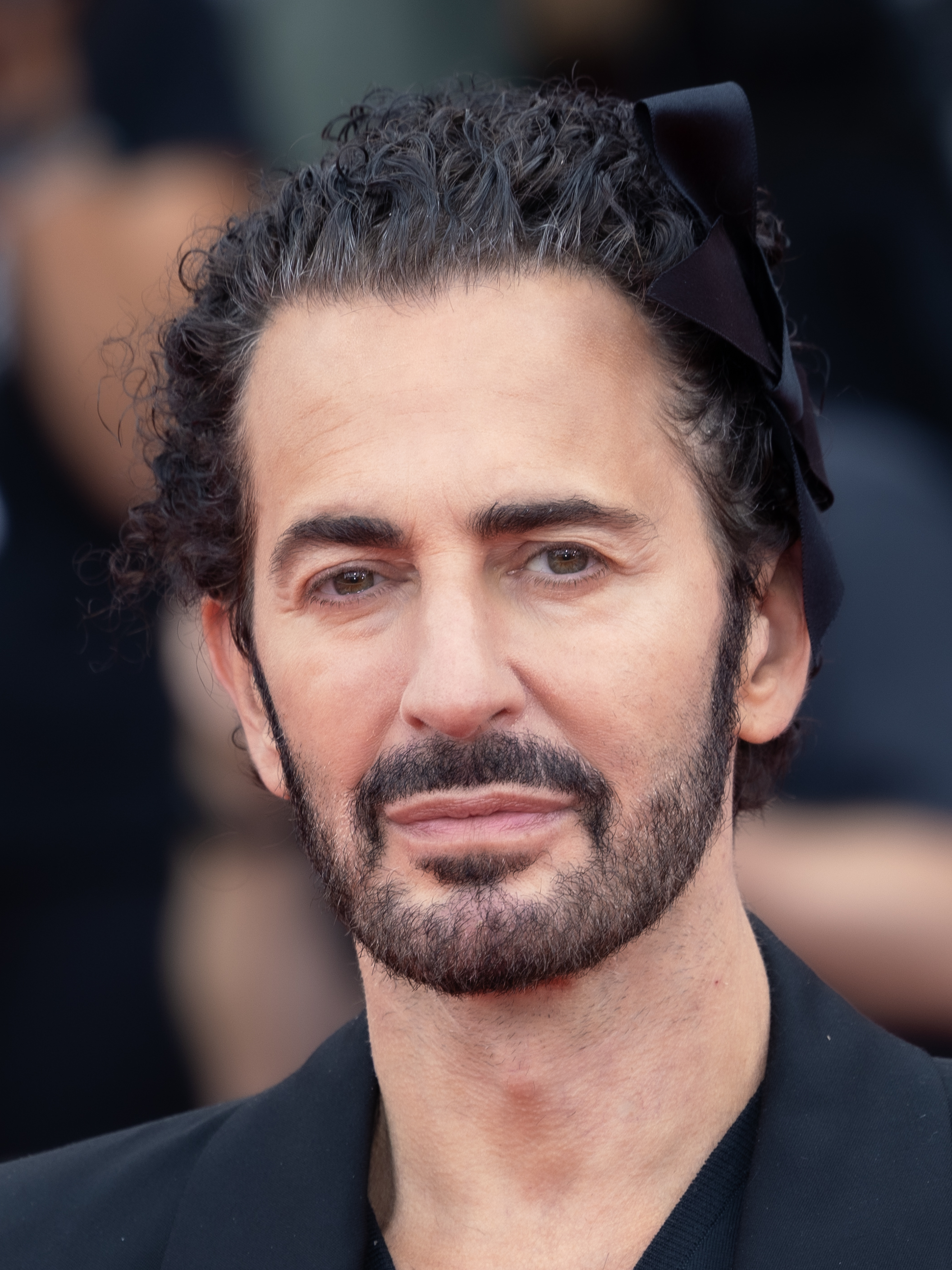
- Jacobs in 2025
- Born: April 9, 1963 (age 63); New York City, U.S.
- Education: High School of Art and Design; Parsons The New School for Design
- Labels: Marc Jacobs; Marc by Marc Jacobs; Louis Vuitton (1997–2014)
- Spouse: Charly Defrancesco (m. 2019)
- Awards: Knight of the Order of Arts and Letters (France)

Marc Jacobs (born April 9, 1963) is an American fashion designer. He is the head designer for his own fashion label, Marc Jacobs, and formerly Marc by Marc Jacobs, a diffusion line, which was produced for approximately fifteen years, before it was discontinued after the 2015 fall/winter collection. At its peak, it had over 200 retail stores in 80 countries. He was the creative director of the French design house Louis Vuitton from 1997 to 2014. Jacobs was on Time magazine's "2010 Time 100" list of the 100 most influential people in the world, and was #14 on Out magazine's 2012 list of "50 Most Powerful Gay Men and Women in America". He married his longtime partner Charly Defrancesco on April 6, 2019.

== Early life and education ==
Jacobs was born to a secular Jewish family in New York City. When he was six, his father, an agent at the William Morris Agency, died. His mother, who remarried three times, was, according to Jacobs, "mentally ill" and "didn't really take care of her kids." As a teenager, he went to live with his paternal grandmother on the Upper West Side, in an apartment in the Majestic on Central Park West.

Jacobs grew up in Teaneck, New Jersey, and attended Teaneck High School.

He developed a passion for fashion at a young age. He attended the High School of Art and Design and studied at Parsons School of Design in New York. While at Parsons in 1984, he won the Perry Ellis & Chester Weinberg Gold Thimble Award, and Design Student of the Year. In 1987, he became the youngest designer ever to receive the Council of Fashion Designers of America's Perry Ellis Award for New Fashion Talent. He also won the Women's Designer of the Year award from the Council of Fashion Designers of America in 1993.

== Career ==
At age 15, Jacobs worked as a stockboy at Charivari, a later defunct avant-garde clothing boutique in New York City. While studying at Parsons, he designed and sold his first line of hand-knit sweaters. He also designed his first collection for Reuben Thomas, Inc., under the Sketchbook label. With Robert Duffy, Jacobs's creative collaborator and business partner from the mid-1980s, he formed Jacobs Duffy Designs.

In 1986, backed by Onward Kashiyama USA, Inc., Jacobs designed his first collection bearing the Marc Jacobs label. In 1987, he was the youngest designer to have ever been awarded the fashion industry's highest tribute, the Council of Fashion Designers of America's Perry Ellis Award for "New Fashion Talent".

=== Perry Ellis, 1988–1993 ===
In 1988, Jacobs and Duffy joined the women's design unit of Perry Ellis as creative director/vice president and president, respectively, following the death of its namesake and founder. In addition, Jacobs oversaw the design of the various women's licensees. In 1992, the Council of Fashion Designers of America awarded Jacobs with The Women's Designer of the Year Award. In the same year, he designed a "grunge" collection for Perry Ellis, which was critically well-received but its commercial failure led to his dismissal. In February 1993, Perry Ellis decided to get out of the manufacturing business and shut down the designer collection.

=== Marc Jacobs, 1986–present ===
Marc Jacobs logo

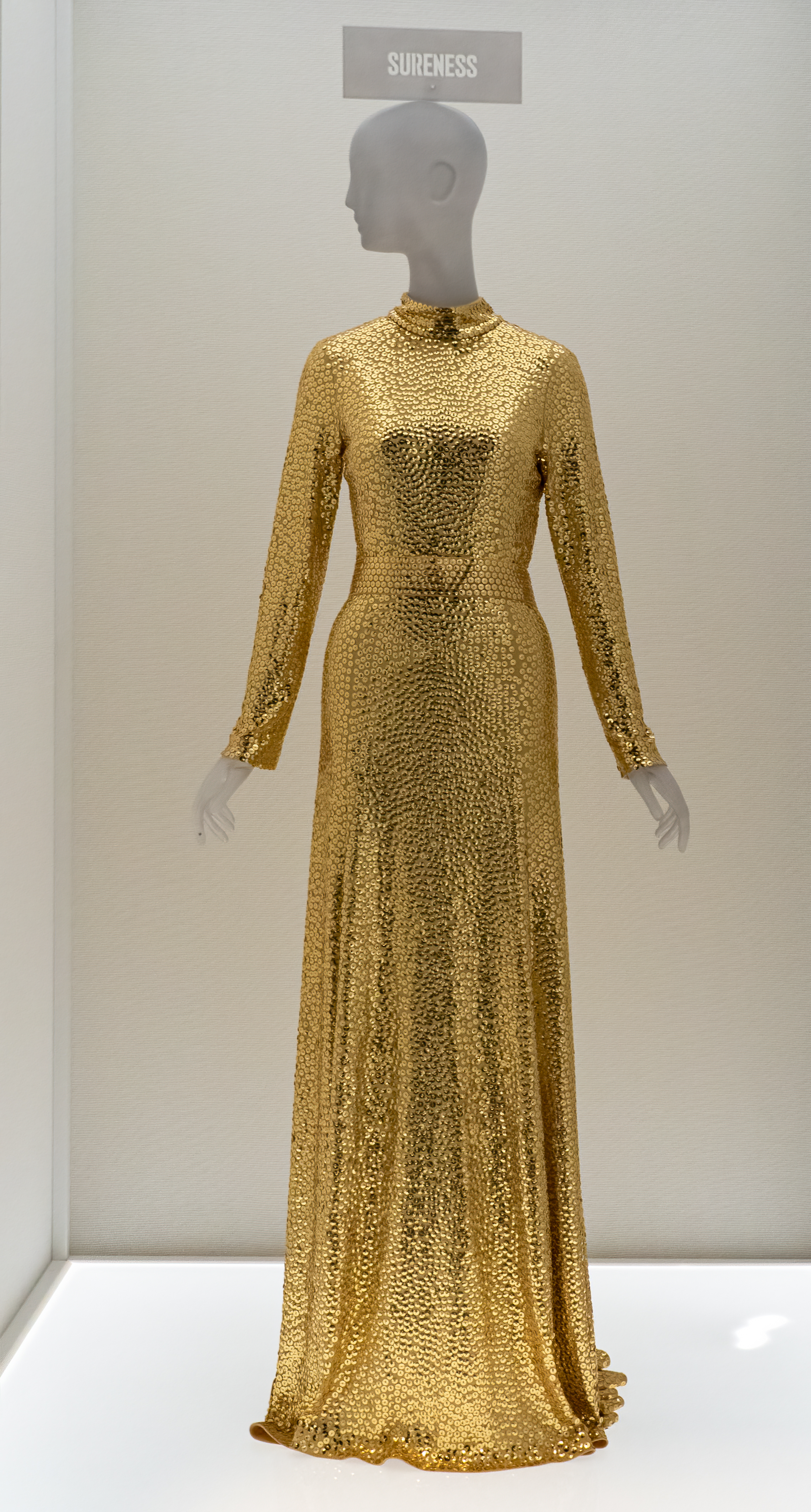
A dress Jacobs designed in 2020 in the Metropolitan Museum of Art exhibition In America: A Lexicon of Fashion

In fall 1993, Jacobs Duffy Designs Inc. launched their own licensing and design company, Marc Jacobs International Company, L.P. In exchange for a percentage of future licensing income, Perry Ellis invested startup capital. In 1994, Jacobs produced his first full collection of menswear.

In 1995, Jacobs signed a global licensing agreement with Italian clothing company Gilmar to manufacture and distribute his main designer collection and a jeanswear line; as part of the agreement, he briefly took on a consulting role for Gilmar’s flagship luxury brand, Iceberg.

LVMH acquired a majority stake in the Marc Jacobs brand in 1997, the same year it named Jacobs Louis Vuitton's first creative director.

For the brand's advertising campaigns, Marc Jacobs has worked with renowned photographers including Juergen Teller (1998–2014), David Sims (since 2014), and Mert Alas and Marcus Piggott (since 2013).

In 2004, Marc Jacobs first entered into a licensing agreement with Safilo for the design, manufacturing and worldwide distribution of the brand's collections of sunglasses and optical frames. The brand first introduced a capsule line for children in 2005, later expanding the collection and the business by entering into licensing agreements with French partners Zannier (2006–2011) and Children Worldwide Fashion Group (from 2011).

In 2006, Jacobs started a new line of body-splash fragrances in ten-ounce bottles which were distributed by Coty; as part of the agreement, Jacobs released his popular Daisy collection of perfumes in 2007.

In 2009, Jacobs launched a shirt, sold at his stores, demanding the legalization of gay marriage. In May 2009, Jacobs co-hosted, with model Kate Moss, a "model and muse"-themed gala for the New York City Metropolitan Museum of Art's Costume Institute.

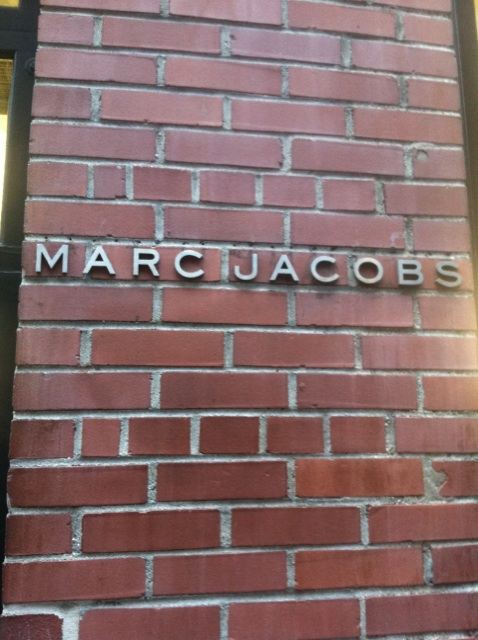
Marc Jacobs storefront in New York City

There were 285 Marc by Marc Jacobs and Marc Jacobs Collection retail locations worldwide as of the summer of 2013. The brand-new Marc Jacobs flagship shop opened in Shanghai in December 2013. There are now three sites for Heaven by Marc Jacobs in Los Angeles, New York City, and London.

For Mercedes-Benz Berlin Fashion Week in July 2011, Jacobs was the patron of the young talent award "Designer for Tomorrow by Peek & Cloppenburg".

By August 2011, it was reported that Jacobs might succeed John Galliano as creative director of Christian Dior. According to The Daily Telegraph, Jacobs "firmly laid to rest rumours that he was to move to Christian Dior" in January 2012, but rumors prevailed.

In 2013, Jacobs served as creative director for the Diet Coke brand's 30th anniversary; he spent a year giving the brand a "stylish and light-hearted" makeover.

In March 2013, the New York Daily News revealed that the "faux fur" used in many Marc Jacobs garments is actually the fur from raccoon dogs from China.

In 2015, Duffy stepped down from his leading role at Marc Jacobs, ceding day-to-day duties but remaining on the board of the company.

In response to weakening business at Marc Jacobs in 2017, LVMH closed down the label’s small menswear business as a cost-cutting measure. In 2018, it hired Baja East co-founder John Targon to join Marc Jacobs as "creative director of contemporary"; he was let go after only two months.

In 2024, Jacobs pledged that his products would not use or sell animal fur – and that they had not since 2018 – in response to a pressure campaign from animal activists.

In 2026, LVMH sold the brand to New York-based brand management firm WHP Global. Under the agreement, WHP formed a 50/50 joint venture with apparel company G-III to own Marc Jacobs' intellectual property.

=== Louis Vuitton, 1997–2014 ===
In 1997, Jacobs was appointed Louis Vuitton's creative director, where he created the company's first ready-to-wear clothing line. Jacobs collaborated with many popular artists for his Louis Vuitton collections, including Stephen Sprouse, Takashi Murakami, Richard Prince, and Kanye West.

In October 2013, after the Spring/Summer 2014 show, it was revealed that Jacobs would leave Louis Vuitton to focus on his own line.

=== Marc by Marc Jacobs, 2001–2015 ===
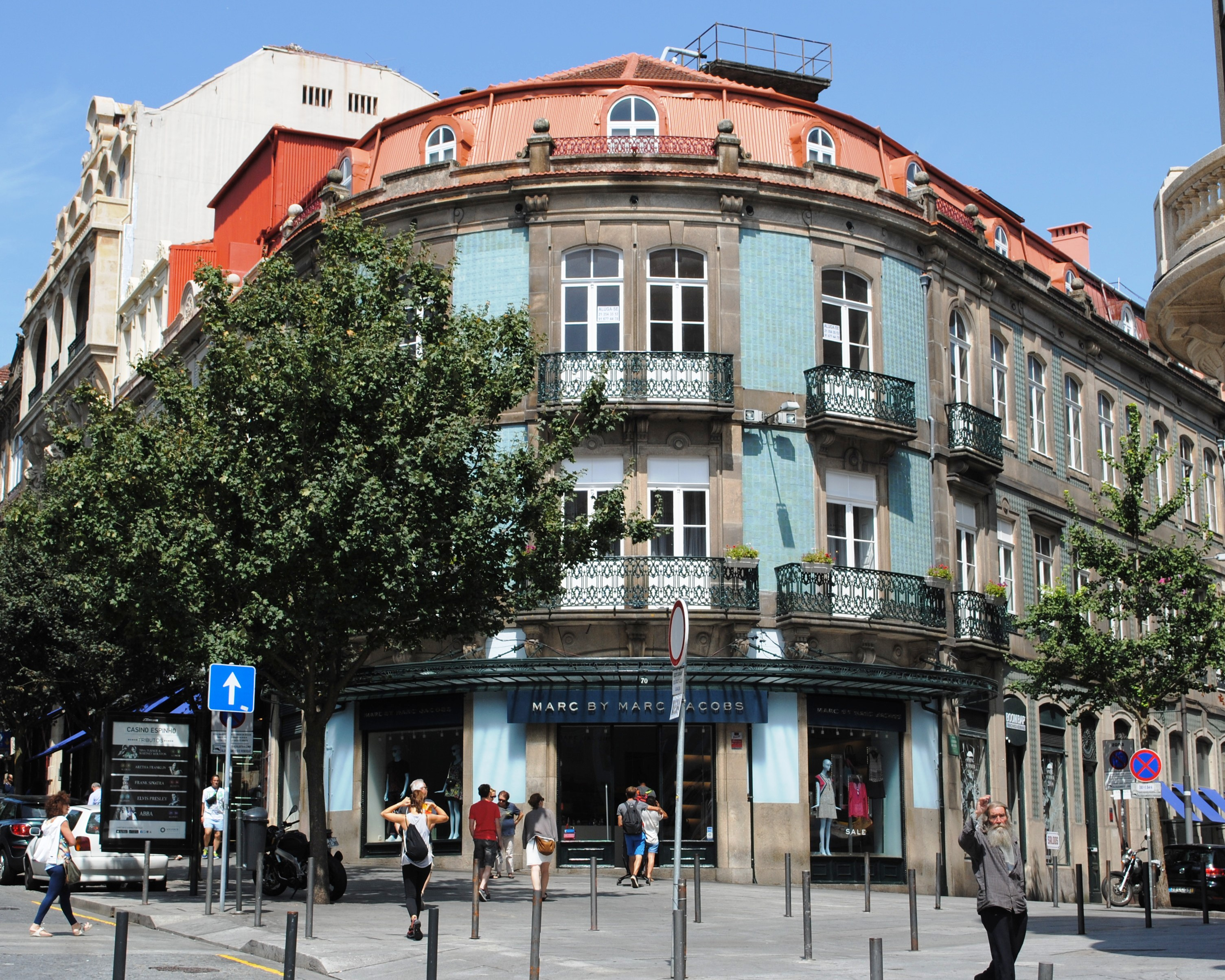
Marc by Marc Jacobs in Porto

In spring 2001, Jacobs introduced his secondary line, Marc by Marc Jacobs. In 2005, Look was the Marc by Marc Jacobs ready-to-wear license holder in Japan with retail value of €50 million. By 2013, Marc by Marc Jacobs was estimated to account for about 80 percent of the brand's revenue. That year, British designers Luella Bartley and Katie Hillier joined the label as creative directors.

Jacobs decided to rely on social media to cast models for Marc by Marc Jacobs's Autumn/Winter 2014 campaign, and with its success did so again for Spring/Summer 2015 with photographer David Sims, with models including Aaron Whitty, Abigail Lipp, Amy Woodman, Ana Viktoria, Dylan Stevens, Eb Eunbi, Lindsay Lurgin, MacKenzie Cockerill, Nadia Kishlan, and Toks Adewetan.

In order to concentrate on the growth of his primary brand and cater to a more upscale clientele, Jacobs announced the closure of his subsidiary label Marc by Marc Jacobs in March 2015.

=== Heaven by Marc Jacobs, 2020–present ===
In September 2020, Jacobs collaborated with Ava Nirui to release Heaven, a polysexual line aimed at a younger audience while blurring gender boundaries, with a campaign featuring beabadoobee and Iris Law.

In February 2023, an editorial shoot for Heaven went viral. The shoot included several New York City nightlife legends sitting on an extremely long couch. Models included Memphy, Amber Later, Iris Apatow, Mel Ottenberg, Goth Jafar, Anna Sui, Riley Hooker, Gabriette, Dean Kissick, and Richie Shazam. The shoot included Marc Jacob as designer, Eloise Parry as photographer, Ava Nirui as creative director, Clare Byrne as fashion editor/stylist, Evanie Frausto as hair stylist, Marcelo Gutierrez as makeup artist, and Bert Martirosyan as casting director.

== Legal issues ==
In February 2008, Jacobs was accused of plagiarizing a scarf design created in the 1950s by Swedish designer Gösta Olofsson. Jacobs settled the matter by offering monetary compensation to Olofsson's son.

In February 2010, Jacobs sued Ed Hardy for infringing on the designs of one of his embroidered handbags.

In 2018, the band Nirvana sued Marc Jacobs over the rights to the band's "smiley face" logo, arguing that the brand had been using a "virtually identical" logo on its "Bootleg Redux Grunge" clothing collection without permission. By 2024, the Marc Jacobs company, artist Robert Fisher and the surviving members of Nirvana settled the lawsuit.

== Films ==
Jacobs made his feature film acting debut in Disconnect (2012), directed by Henry-Alex Rubin and starring Jason Bateman, Paula Patton, Alexander Skarsgård and Andrea Riseborough. His character, Harvey, runs a house of teenage Internet porn performers, which is being investigated by a TV reporter, played by Riseborough.

In 2007, filmmaker Loïc Prigent released a documentary film about Jacobs entitled Marc Jacobs and Louis Vuitton. In September 2025, a documentary about Jacobs which was made by Sofia Coppola titled Marc by Sofia premiered at the 2025 Venice Film Festival.

== Style ==
Explaining his clothes, Jacobs has said "what I prefer is that even if someone feels hedonistic, they don't look it. Curiosity about sex is much more interesting to me than domination... My clothes are not hot. Never. Never." The audience for his fashion shows typically includes celebrities such as Kim Gordon and Vincent Gallo. Guy Trebay, a critic for The New York Times, in response to Oscar de la Renta's comment that a coat designed by Jacobs closely resembled one that de la Renta had designed thirty years earlier, wrote that "unlike the many brand-name designers who promote the illusion that their output results from a single prodigious creativity, Mr. Jacobs makes no pretense that fashion emerges full blown from the head of one solitary genius". Jacobs was one of the first fashion designers to establish this "street wise aesthetics – a [mash up of] a little preppie, a little grunge, a little couture."

The Marc Jacobs brand has fine arts driven and avant-garde advertisement campaigns, often featuring a group of cultural icons and artists, in lieu of traditional fashion models in minimally staged settings and photographed by high-profile photographers. In 2015, Jacobs launched a popular lifestyle campaign that featured artists, celebrities, and cultural icons such as Sofia Coppola, Cher, Willow Smith, Winona Ryder, Daisy Lowe, and Anthony Kiedis.

Jacobs revisited this approach for the Marc Jacobs Spring 2016 advertising campaign, describing the concept as a fashion story representing a "series of connected events; a visual narrative. It is a personal diary of people who have and continue to inspire me and open my mind to different ways of seeing and thinking. The spectrum of individuals photographed in our Spring/Summer 2016 ad campaign represent a celebration of my America." He further added that "the people featured in our campaign personify this collection of fashion through their individuality. Collectively, they embody and celebrate the spirit and beauty of equality." The New York Observer called it "the best campaign of the Spring 2016 season," and that "the designer [Marc Jacobs] has handpicked a star-studded cast of his family members [people who are key to the Marc Jacobs brand] to model the Americana gear from this collection," thus making the collection notable. The Marc Jacobs Spring 2016 advertising campaign featured Lana Wachowski, Sandra Bernhard, Bette Midler, Juliette Lewis, Christina Ricci, Sky Ferreira, Bella Hadid, Emily Ratajkowski, Vincent Michaud, Oli Burslem, Milk, and several runway models.

== Personal life and causes ==
Jacobs has an ongoing project entitled "Protect The Skin You're In", which has celebrities pose nude, with their breasts and lower frontal area covered, for T-shirts to raise awareness about melanoma. All sales benefit research at the NYU Langone Medical Center. Some of the celebrities who have posed include Miley Cyrus, Eva Mendes, Kate Upton, Victoria Beckham, Heidi Klum, Hilary Swank, Cara Delevingne, and Naomi Campbell.

Jacobs began dating Brazilian public relations executive Lorenzo Martone in 2008. The couple became engaged in 2009, but eventually ended their relationship.

On April 4, 2018, Jacobs proposed marriage to Charly Defrancesco, via a flash mob while in a Chipotle restaurant. The flash mob did a routine to the song "Kiss" by Prince. They married in New York City on April 6, 2019.

From 2009 to 2020, Jacobs owned a 4,796-square-foot townhouse designed by Robert A. M. Stern in New York's West Village. In 2019, he and Defrancesco purchased the 6,000-square-foot Max Hoffman House, located in Rye, New York and designed by Frank Lloyd Wright.

In 2026, Jacobs started a firestorm of backlash when he said in an interview he would dress murderer Luigi Mangione at trial, if presented with the opportunity.

== Awards ==
- On August 26, 2019, Jacobs was presented with MTV's first "Fashion Trailblazer Award" at the Video Music Awards, in partnership with the Council of Fashion Designers of America.
- On January 22, 2010, Frédéric Mitterrand awarded him the insignia of Chevalier of the Order of Arts and Letters.
- CFDA Womenswear Designer of the Year, 2016
- MTV Video Music Fashion Trailblazer Award, 2019

== See also ==
- LGBT culture in New York City
- List of fashion designers
- List of people from New York City
- List of LGBT people from New York City
- NYC Pride March
