= Toward the Third Republic =

Political party of italy

Toward the Third Republic (Verso la Terza Repubblica) was a political manifesto for a new centrist political party in Italy launched during a convention in Rome on 17 November 2012. It aimed at forming a political base for Prime Minister Mario Monti, who chose to enter the fray in late December.

The leading promoters of the manifesto included Luca Cordero di Montezemolo, Carlo Calenda, Andrea Romano, Nicola Rossi, Irene Tinagli, Federico Vecchioni and their think tank Future Italy, Andrea Riccardi (founder of the Community of Sant'Egidio and minister of International Cooperation in Monti's government), Raffaele Bonanni (Italian Confederation of Workers' Trade Unions), Andrea Olivero (Christian Associations of Italian Workers), Carlo Costalli (Christian Movement of Workers), Lorenzo Dellai (Union for Trentino), Alessio Vianello, Enrico Zanetti and Maria Gomierato on behalf of Toward North, and the Sardinian Reformers.

Most of these people and groups followed Monti in his political creature, Civic Choice, which was founded on 4 January 2013.
