= Rome bid for the 2020 Summer Olympics =

Bid to host the Summer Olympics

Bids for the 2020 Summer Olympics
Overview
- Games of the XXXII Olympiad

Details
- City: Rome, Italy
- Chair: Mario Pescante
- NOC: Italian National Olympic Committee (CONI)

Previous Games hosted
- 1960 Summer Olympics

Rome 2020 (Italian: Roma 2020) was a proposed bid for the 2020 Summer Olympics by the city of Rome and the Italian National Olympic Committee. Rome had previously hosted the 1960 Summer Olympics. The bid for the 2020 Games was withdrawn due to the lack of support from the Italian government.

== History ==
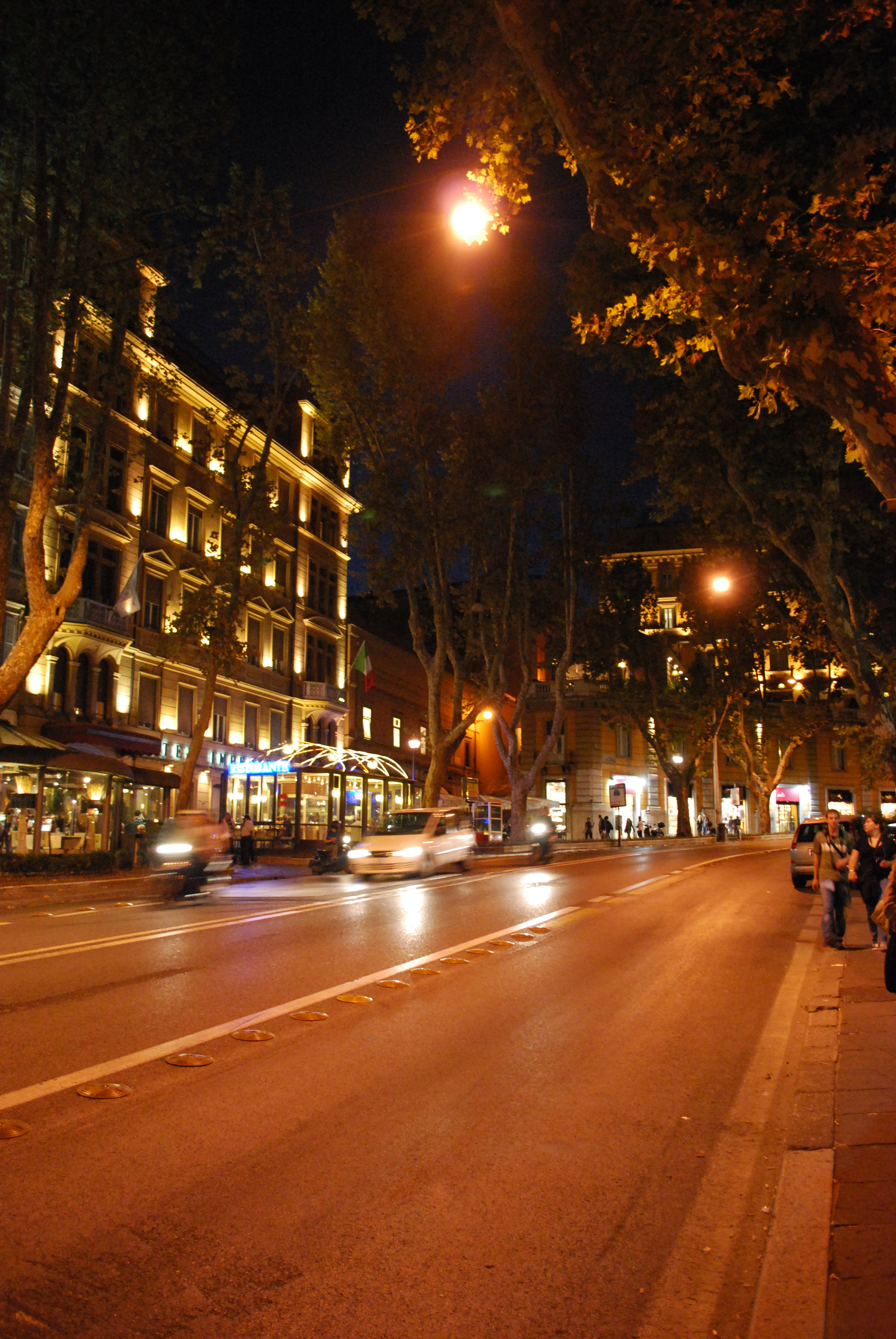
Rome's Via Veneto at night

The Italian National Olympic Committee (CONI) announced the selection of Rome as Italy's candidate city on May 19, 2010. Rome was selected ahead of Venice which was deemed unable to fulfill requirements set by the IOC for hosting the Games; among other things, it relied too heavily on venues outside the city, including in Treviso and Padua. The initial Rome proposal included a $61 million bid budget and a plan to utilize 70 percent of existing venues.

Ferrari president Luca di Montezemolo, who ran the 1990 FIFA World Cup, was asked to lead the bid committee, but turned down the offer. Entrepreneur Nerio Alessandri was also offered the job but he too declined. IOC vice president Mario Pescante was chosen instead. His appointment was cleared by the IOC Ethics Committee, which found no conflict of interest. In an interview with media outlet Around the Rings, Pescante acknowledged competition from other potential bid cities, particularly emphasizing Tokyo's bid.

In a September 2011 interview, IOC President Jacques Rogge defended Rome's and Madrid's ability to host the 2020 Olympics in spite of the ongoing eurozone debt crisis. He pointed out that both cities already had a lot of venues in place and not much would need to be built. He continued by saying that, at the very most, some venues would need to be upgraded but that both cities had the necessary infrastructure to host the Games. Rome's bid was given full backing by the Italian government on February 22, 2011. The bid had an initial budget of €31 million. The chairman of the bid committee, Mario Pescante, stated that he hoped Rome's bid could serve as "a blueprint for a return to fiscal responsibility and real sustainability in the Olympic bidding process".

On October 3, 2011, Rome 2020 announced that they had hired marketing firm Helios Partners as a consultant for their bid. The firm had a track record of assisting in the successful bids of several Olympic host cities. (Two months after Rome withdrew their bid, Helios Partners was signed as a consultant to Baku's 2020 bid.) On October 11, 2011, the bid committee hired Coni Servizi Engineering and Consulting as their lead technical partner with the remit of assisting the bid committee with their venue master plan.

In November 2011, "GiovaniRoma2020" (YouthRome2020) was launched to help promote the bid as well as promoting youth olympic education. The following month, the bid received the support of the country's environment ministry; Environment Minister Corrado Clini stated that the bid needed to be environmentally sustainable to boost its chances of success. The bid was also supported by Italy's Chamber of Deputies.

In January 2012, the Rome 2020 bid committee estimated that the cost of organizing the Games would be €9.8 billion but hosting the Games would lead to a growth of €17.7 billion (a 1.4% increase) in Italian GDP, with the creation of 29,000 jobs. The public cost would be €4.6 billion and hosting the Games would bring in €4.6 billion in tax revenue. By January 2012, there was high public support for the bid amongst Italian citizens, with 74% of Italians supporting the bid and 77% of Rome residents in support. Of those polled who supported the bid, 70% were in favor because they believed that hosting the Olympics would create economic benefits and jobs.

On February 14, 2012, Italian Prime Minister Mario Monti called an end to the bid, citing uncertain costs and unknown financial benefit. The announcement came a day before the deadline for applicant cities to submit the application files.

=== Outlook, conclusion and future ===
After Rome's bid for the 2020 Games was abandoned, there was talk about the city potentially bidding for the 2024 Summer Olympics. Rome did put in a bid for the 2024 Games but in September 2016 this bid was also cancelled, mainly for cost reasons and because of the huge infrastructure changes that the city would have to endure.

Tokyo was ultimately elected as the host city of the 2020 Summer Olympics at the 125th IOC Session in Buenos Aires, Argentina.

== Previous bids ==
Rome first bid for the 1908 Summer Olympics and was ultimately awarded the games. However the eruption of Mount Vesuvius in 1906 forced Italy to return the hosting rights to the IOC. The IOC transferred the 1908 Games to London. Rome later bid for the 1924 Summer Olympics but lost to Paris. They then bid for the 1936 Games but lost to Berlin. They bid for the 1944 Summer Olympics which were awarded to London, then cancelled due to World War II. Rome successfully bid for the 1960 Summer Olympics.

The city had previously bid for the 2004 Summer Olympics, where it was shortlisted as a candidate city but lost to Athens in the final round of voting.

=== Previous bids from other Italian cities ===
Milan bid for the 1908 Summer Olympics but was defeated by London and also for 2000 Summer Olympics but then withdrew eventually.

Italy has made multiple bids for the Winter Olympics. Cortina d'Ampezzo successfully bid for the 1944 Winter Olympics but these games were cancelled due to World War II. Cortina d'Ampezzo bid for the 1952 Winter Olympics but lost to Oslo. They successfully bid to host the 1956 Winter Olympics. They later bid for the 1988 and 1992 Winter Games but lost to Calgary and Albertville respectively. Aosta bid for the 1998 Winter Olympics but lost to Nagano. Tarvisio bid for the 2002 Winter Olympics but failed to become a candidate city. These games were ultimately awarded to Salt Lake City. Turin successfully bid to host the 2006 Winter Olympics. Cortina d'Ampezzo and Milan were successful in their joint bid for hosting the 2026 Winter Olympics.

== Overview ==
The year 2020 coincides with the sesquicentennial (150th) anniversary of the declaration of Rome as the capital of united Italy. Among the main goals highlighted in the bid's vision was environmental sustainability through efficient use of energy and the optimization of existing facilities. Hosting the games would have facilitated urban renewal in the Tiber River Park (Parco Fluviale del Tevere), the construction of Tor Vergata Sports City (Città dello Sport di Tor Vergata), and the upgrade of transport infrastructure in the city, including the airport. The bid committee estimated a 20 percent rise in incoming tourists, with 3 million spectators expected. The games were projected to reach a global audience of 4 billion.

=== Venues ===
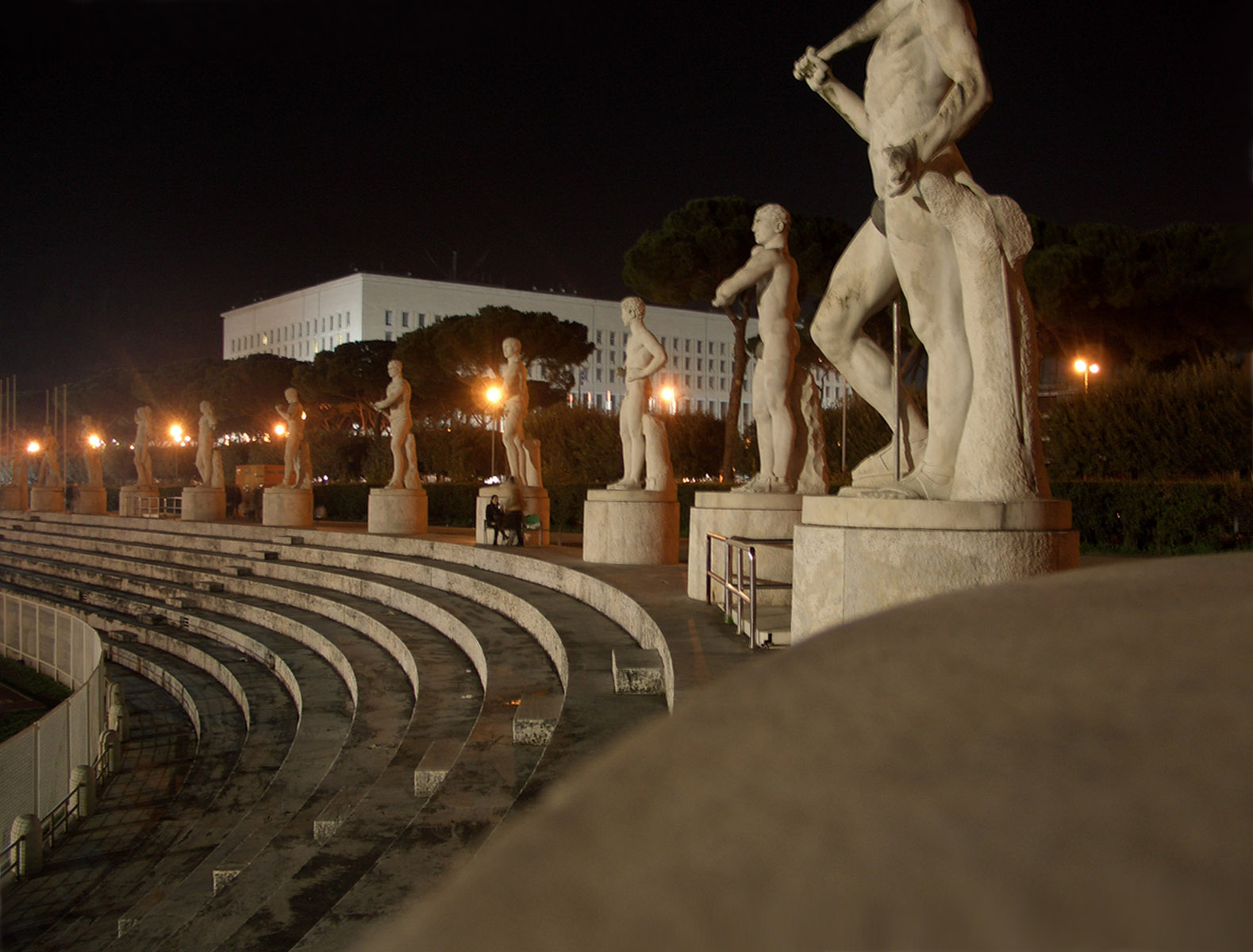
Rome's Foro Italico sports complex

Rome's bid relied mainly on existing venues, most of which were used when Rome hosted the 1960 Summer Olympics. The bid consisted of two poles: the Olympic Park in the north and the Fiera di Roma in the southwest. The Olympic village would have been located near downtown.

The Olympic Park was to be located at the existing Foro Italico sports complex and would have consisted of the centerpiece Stadio Olimpico, a newly built 10,500-seat tennis stadium, and the outdoor aquatics venues used for the 2009 World Aquatics Championships. The Stadio Olimpico would have hosted athletics events and the men's football final. The Stadio Flaminio most likely would have hosted rugby sevens and the women's football final. Other existing venues included the Piazza di Siena for horse jumping, the Circus Maximus for beach volleyball, the Acqua Acetosa for modern pentathlon, hockey, and archery, the Olgiata for golf, and the Settebagni for canoeing, rowing, and canoe slalom. The Tor di Quinto area was chosen to house the IBC and MPC. After the 2020 Games, the reconstructed area was to be known as the Tiber River Park, which would have included 40 hectares of green space along the Tiber.

The Fiera di Roma was expected to host badminton, cycling, gymnastics, judo, wrestling, handball, boxing, fencing, weightlifting, taekwondo, and table tennis.

The Tor Vergata, located in the outskirts, would have consisted of two newly constructed venues for hosting volleyball, gymnastics, trampoline, and the basketball finals.

Other venues included the Lunghezza for shooting and the Pratoni del Vivaro for mountain biking. Preliminary football rounds were to be held in other cities as well.

== See also ==
- Italy at the Olympics
- Rome bid for the 2024 Summer Olympics
