= Future Italy =

Italian think tank

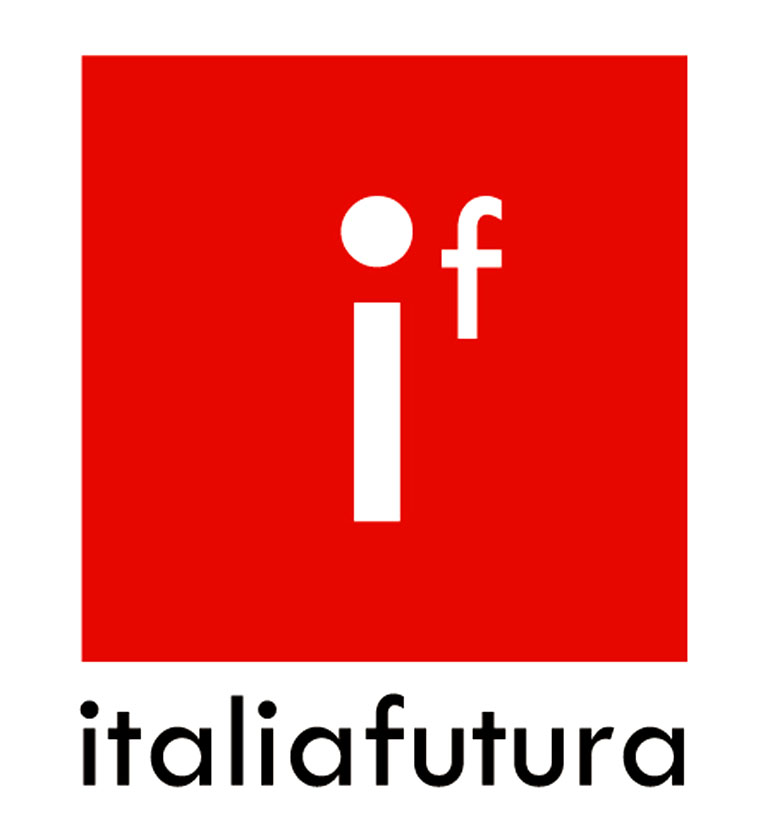
- Founded: July 2009
- Founder: Luca Cordero di Montezemolo
- Dissolved: May 2014
- Type: Think tank
- Location: Rome, Italy
- President: Carlo Pontecorvo
- Key people: Lelio Alfonso, Carlo Calenda, Vincenzo Camporini, Stefano Dambruoso, Alessandro De Nicola, Diego Della Valle, Luigi Marino, Michel Martone, Angelo Mellone, Maria Paola Merloni, Vittorio Emanuele Parsi, Corrado Passera, Simone Perillo, Gianni Punzo, Andrea Romano, Nicola Rossi, Andrea Riccardi, Federico Vecchioni Irene Tinagli
- Website: www.italiafutura.it

Future Italy (Italia Futura, IF) was an Italian liberal-centrist think tank, formed in 2009 by Luca Cordero di Montezemolo, chairman of Alitalia (2014–2017) and former chairman of Ferrari (1991–2014), FIAT (2004–2010) and Confindustria (2004–2008).

Between 2013 and 2014, IF acted as a de facto internal faction of Civic Choice, a centrist party launched by Mario Monti.

== History ==
IF was launched in July 2009 by Montezemolo along with a substantial group of entrepreneurs, managers and intellectuals, notably including Diego Della Valle, Maria Paola Merloni, Gianni Punzo, Corrado Passera, Luigi Marino, Carlo Calenda, Andrea Romano, Vittorio Emanuele Parsi, Stefano Dambruoso, Irene Tinagli, Angelo Mellone, and Michel Martone.

Romano, who was appointed IF director, was formerly close to Massimo D'Alema, and many of IF leading members came from the centre-left. A strong supporter of Montezemolo's project was Massimo Cacciari, philosopher, three-times mayor of Venice and disgruntled Democrat, who had inspired a Veneto-based regional party called Toward North (VN). In Montezemolo's words, however, IF aimed at forming a new "popular, reform and authentically liberal force" which would hegemonize the political centre of Italian politics, in dialogue with "responsible people" of the established parties.

In December 2011 Federico Vecchioni, a Venetian who had been president of Confagricoltura (2004–2011) and founder of IF in Tuscany, was appointed national coordinator, in what was described by some observers as a step toward the transformation of IF into a full-fledged political party. As of October 2012, IF had organized regional sections virtually in all the regions of Italy. A leading member of VN, Andrea Causin, was appointed as one of the three regional coordinators of IF in Veneto, and other key members of VN were co-opted in IF's regional committee. Other local associations were integrated too.

After long speculation, in mid-2012, Montezemolo seemed ready to enter politics and that the think tank would be transformed into a political party. On 30 September 2012, in an interview to Corriere della Sera, Montezemolo announced that IF would take part to the 2013 general election and that it would support Mario Monti to serve a full term as Prime Minister of Italy. According to some sources Montezemolo could have been the leader of a new centrist coalition composed of his movement and some of the parties which once formed the New Pole for Italy, mainly the Union of the Centre (UdC), Future and Freedom (FLI) and Alliance for Italy (ApI).

IF however distanced from established parties as the UdC in favour of an entirely new political proposal. On 17 November 2012 IF took part to the founding of Toward the Third Republic (VTR). The week before Vecchioni had resigned from coordinator amid allegations of fraud, and was replaced by Calenda.

In January 2013 IF was instrumental to the foundation of Mario Monti's Civic Choice (SC). At the 2013 general election SC, which led a coalition comprising also the UdC and FLI, garnered 8.3% of the vote. Several IF leading members, notably including Romano, Calenda, Merloni, Tinagli, Dambruoso, Causin were elected to the Italian Parliament. Calenda, who left the post of coordinator, was appointed deputy minister of Economic Development in Letta Cabinet.

After the election, Nicola Rossi, a leading economic liberal, former senator of the Democrats of the Left and former president of Bruno Leoni Institute, was elected IF president, while Simone Perillo was appointed director. According to Montezemolo and Rossi, far from becoming an organised faction within SC, IF would return to its original nature of think tank, while the MPs hailing from IF would be a "liberal and reform-minded" force within Parliament. However, as soon as in October 2013, Rossi abruptly left the presidency of IF. According to Formiche.net, an online journal, this was the consequence of Montezemolo's contempt for Rossi's "ultra-liberalism", while SC seemed oriented at joining the European People's Party and not the Alliance of Liberals and Democrats for Europe Party as IF would like.

In March 2014 Carlo Pontecorvo, a physician-turned-entrepreneur, was sworn in as new IF president. Subsequently, the think tank stopped playing a role within SC: while some of its former leading members continued to be active within the party (e.g. Dambruoso), others took different paths by joining the Democratic Party (Calenda, Romano, Tinagli), Popular Area (Causin, Marino) and Unique Italy (Alfonso), led by former IF member Passera. Moreover, Pontecorvo criticised IF's former allegiance with SC and its consequent alliance with the UdC, while proposing to organise the think tank as a full-fledged party.

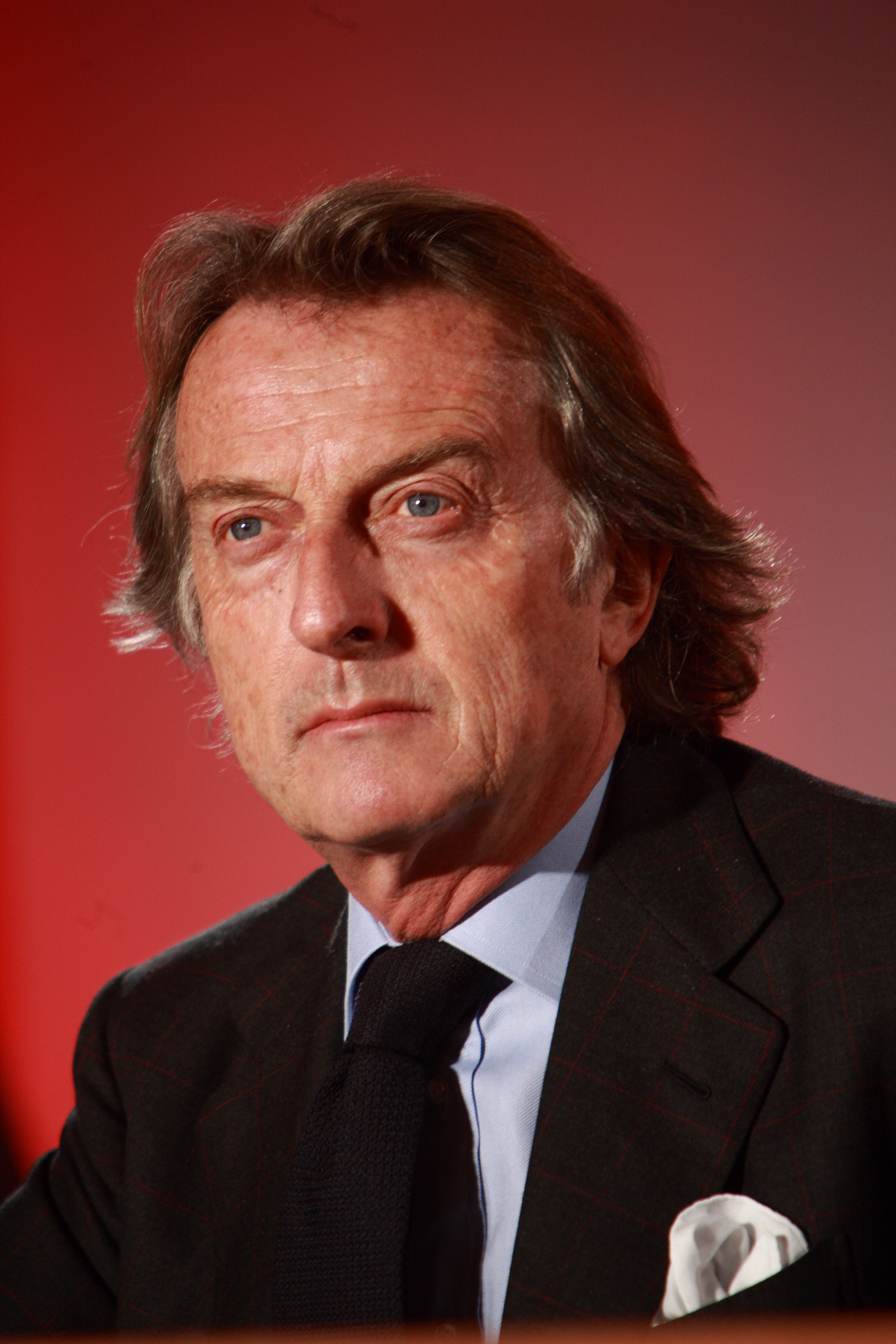
Luca Cordero di Montezemolo

== Leadership ==
- President: Luca Cordero di Montezemolo (2009–2013), Nicola Rossi (2013), Carlo Pontecorvo (2014–present)
  - Honorary President: Luca Cordero di Montezemolo (2013–2014)
- Director: Andrea Romano (2009–2013), Simone Perillo (2013–present)
- Coordinator: Federico Vecchioni (2011–2012), Carlo Calenda (2012–2013)
- Spokesperson: Lelio Alfonso (2012–2013)
