= Andrea Romano =

Andrea Romano may refer to:

- Andrea Romano (voice director) (born 1955), American casting director, voice director and voice actress
- Andrea Romano (politician) (born 1967), Italian politician
- Andrea Romanò (born 1993), Italian footballer
