= Collective Hardware =

US artist collective

Collective Hardware is an artist collective based in New York City. Located at 169 Bowery, Collective Hardware members work in print media, fashion, film production and editing, music creation and engineering, hair styling, and more.

Black Book Magazine offers this description:

Hard-to-define, hard-to-leave, multi-faceted Bowery building hell-bent on artistic expression. One-of-a-kind designer, couture goods can be had on one floor, show room for art (sound installations, giant photographs, and other visually engaging material) on another, recording studios, special effects, hair stylist, you name it on the rest. Sub-Delancey hive of creative expression buzzes with international and local scene-making artists, musicians, actors, and others in the mix. Special guests get a signature Stu Bronz rant for the road before they break.

The collective was evicted from 169 Bowery in May 2010 after failing to pay $1 million in back rent.
