= Simec =

Simec may refer to:

- SIMEC, a submarine vehicle manufacturing company, subsidiary of Orange Marine
- SIMeC, a local currency in Guardiagrele, Italy, created by Giacinto Auriti
- Maja Šimec, Miss Slovenia 1997
- Grupo Simec, a Mexican steel company traded on the Bolsa Mexicana de Valores
- SIMEC Group (Shipping, Infrastructure, Mining, Energy and Commodities), a member of the GFG Alliance
