= Stefano Cianciotta =

Stefano Cianciotta is professor of communication and media management of corporate crisis at the Faculty of Communication Sciences at University of Teramo. He is also senior fellow of the Competere think tank, founded by the Adjunct Assistant Professor of Business Administration at John Cabot University in Rome Pietro Paganini and the Italian specialist in public relations and strategic communication Roberto Race, which focuses on innovation in the economy. He is also specialist in public relations and strategic communication.

Cianciotta and Paganini co-wrote the book "Training for the future".

== Bibliography ==
- Training for the future- Allenarsi per il futuro -Rubbettino
- La condanna della Commissione Grandi Rischi. Responsabilità istituzionali e obblighi di Comunicazione nella società del Rischio
