= Elizabeth Sulcer =

American fashion stylist

- Citizenship: American
- Education: Rhode Island School of Design
- Occupation: Fashion stylist
- Employer(s): Vogue Italia, BlackBook; Freelance (2010-present)
- Agent: La La Land

Elizabeth Sulcer is an American fashion stylist known for ultra-feminine and creative high fashion stylings.

== Work ==
Sulcer studied design at Rhode Island School of Design and apprenticed with British fashion designer Alexander McQueen, and was fashion editor at BlackBook magazine until 2009. In addition to BlackBook magazine, she styled clothing for numerous Vogue magazines, including Vogue China, Vogue Italia, Vogue Japan, Vogue Russia and Vogue Spain, as well as for the magazines Numero Paris, Self Service, V Magazine, Vanity Fair, and others. She worked on advertising campaigns for designers Giorgio Armani, Max Azria, Halston and Hervé Leger, and for cosmetics and clothing retailers including Express, Sephora, L'Oréal, Dior, Guerlain, Bvlgari, Brian Atwood, Nike, Maybelline and Victoria's Secret. She chose apparel for models and actors and other celebrities including French singer Vanessa Paradis, Victoria's Secret model Karlie Kloss, Russian-American model Anne V, Australian actress Cate Blanchett, American actresses Claire Danes and Amy Adams and Hilary Swank, Latvian model Ieva Lagūna, and actor Matt Dillon.

She has worked with photographers David Bellemere, Ellen von Unwerth, Greg Kadel, Mert Alas & Marcus Piggot, and Peter Lindbergh.

Sulcer was married in New York in 2014 and her wedding was covered in Brides magazine.

In 2023, she created a capsule collection with French fashion brand, Each x Other.
