= University of Teramo =

Public research university in Teramo, Italy

Coordinates: 42°39′32.00″N 13°41′34.87″E

- Università degli Studi di Teramo
- Type: Public
- Established: 1993
- Rector: Christian Corsi
- Administrative staff: 198
- Students: 10,000
- Location: Teramo, Italy
- Website: www.unite.it

The University of Teramo (Italian: Università degli Studi di Teramo) is a public research university located in Teramo, Italy. The academic institution was officially established in 1993, following more than 30 years as a satellite campus of the D'Annunzio University of Chieti–Pescara.

== History ==
The University of Teramo's origins lie in the D'Annunzio University of Chieti–Pescara, a private educational institution founded in 1955. Over the next decade, the facility became a multi-campus institution that served the region of Abruzzo, spanning locations in Chieti, Pescara, and Teramo. In 1965, the consortium was recognized by Luigi Gui, the then-Minister of Public Education, allowing the member campuses to offer recognized university-level programming.

The Teramo campus, originally the consortium's Faculty of Law, received a Faculty of Political Science in 1969 and further expanded to house a Faculty of Veterinary Medicine in 1989. The University of Teramo became an independent entity in 1993.

== Operations ==
=== Campuses ===
As of 2025, the University offers 23 undergraduate programs and over 20 master's programs, delivered across five faculties. The majority of its programming is offered at its Coste St. Agostino campus, a 500,000 square metre facility that also hosts amenities for students, such as campus media and a movie theatre.

The last three years of its veterinary medicine program are taught at its University Veterinary Teaching Hospital, a 100,000 square metre dedicated campus. Construction of the hospital took six years at a cost of 9.5 million euros, funded at the University's own expense. In 2010, the faculty became a member of the European Association of Establishments for Veterinary Education, an association of veterinary training facilities that meet the highest European Union standards.

=== Student life ===
Students at the University of Teramo operate a campus radio station, Radio Frequency ("Radio Frequenza"). Every year, Radio Frequency is one of many student radio stations throughout Europe to hold a 24-hour commemoration of the lives of Antonio Megalizzi and Bartosz Orent-Niedzielski, two radio journalists who died in the 2018 Strasbourg attack.

=== Financial aid ===
Several scholarships that facilitate enrolment at the University are available to both domestic and international students.

=== Research activities ===
As of March 2025, research activities conducted by University of Teramo faculty and staff have resulted in the publication of more than 5,600 scientific papers, which have been cited over 132,800 times. The University's research output has received international media attention, including for work in the fields of cloning, insects as food, and the effects of unnecessary involuntary commitment on women during the Mussolini years.

The University of Teramo has also collaborated on research with Italy's National Institute of Geophysics and Volcanology and the Scientific Institute for Research, Hospitalization and Healthcare. In 2019, as part of a commitment to foster closer co-operation with institutions in Africa, the University of Teramo signed an agreement with 29 African universities to facilitate the mobility of student researchers.

== Organization ==
Rankings
- CENSIS-La Repubblica (state small-sized universities) (2014, national): 2
- Il Sole 24 Ore (state universities) (2015, national): 31

The University is divided into the following five faculties:

- Agriculture
- Communication Science
- Law
- Political Science
- Veterinary Medicine

== Rectors ==
List of rectors:

- Paolo Benvenuti (1993–1994)
- Luciano Russi (1994–2005)
- Mauro Mattioli (2005–2009)
- Rita Tranquilli-Leali (2009–2012)
- Luciano D'Amico (2013–2018)
- Dino Mastrocola (2018–2024)
- Christian Corsi (since 2024)

== Notable people ==
=== Faculty ===
Notable professors who have taught at the University of Teramo include:

- Giacinto Auriti
- Renato Brunetta
- Stefano Cianciotta
- Rocco Buttiglione
- Gianni Cuperlo
- Michel Martone
- Lorenzo Ornaghi
- Marco Pannella
- Ashish kumar

== See also ==
- List of Italian universities
- Teramo
