= Rome bid for the 2024 Summer Olympics =

Bids for the 2024 Summer Olympics and Paralympics
Overview
- Games of the XXXIII Olympiad; XVII Paralympic Games

Details
- City: Rome, Italy
- Chair: Giovanni Malagò and Raffaele Pagnozzi
- NOC: Italian National Olympic Committee (CONI)

Previous Games hosted
- 1960 Summer Olympics; Previously bid for 2004

The Rome bid for the 2024 Summer Olympics and Summer Paralympics was an attempt to bring the 2024 Summer Olympics to the city of Rome. On 21 September 2016, Rome withdrew its bid for the Games.

== Bid history ==
The city hosted the 1960 Summer Olympics and expressed an interest in bidding for 2024. A Rome bid for the 2020 Summer Olympics was canceled in 2012, when the Italian government withdrew its support from the bid on the eve of the delivery of the application files, stating that it would not be a responsible use of money in "Italy's current condition". However, on 15 December 2014, the prime minister Matteo Renzi confirmed that Rome would be bidding for the 2024 Olympics.

On 10 February 2015, the Italian National Olympic Committee (CONI) confirmed that former Ferrari President Luca Cordero di Montezemolo would lead Rome's bid as President of the Organising Committee. The 67-year-old Montezemolo led the local organizing committee for the 1990 FIFA World Cup in Italy. In June 2016, Simone Gambino, president of the Federazione Cricket Italiana, said that cricket would be included at the 2024 Olympics, if Rome became the host city.

The bid was cancelled on 21 September 2016, when Mayor of Rome Virginia Raggi told reporters it would go no further. Raggi, whose party the Five Star Movement have long been opposed to Rome hosting the games, cited ongoing financial troubles in the country as the main reason for cancelling the bid. She said hosting the games would be "irresponsible" and would only cause the city to fall into further debt. On October 5, 2016, Rome 2024 officials said they will hold a news conference on Tuesday October 11, 2016 to address the future of the bid. On October 11, 2016, the Italian capital bowed out amid persistent opposition from the local government, with bid officials expressing only a slight hope that their campaign might be revived. On 17 October 2016, Olympic leaders continued to voice their displeasure with the political climate that forced Rome to suspend its bid for the 2024 Summer Games.

=== Aftermath ===
In 2017, Paris and Los Angeles had won their hosting bids for the 2024 and 2028 Summer Olympics, respectively. Two years later, the city of Milan and the resort town of Cortina d'Ampezzo won the bid to host the 2026 Winter Olympics.

== Dates ==
Rome 2024 bid proposed as the dates of celebration of the Olympics from August 2 to 18, 2024 and for the Paralympics from September 4 to 15, 2024.

== Venues ==
The 2024 Rome Olympic bid takes advantage of a large amount of existing and temporary venues in and around the city area. Candidature File Stage 1 Italian National Olympic Committee pages 10–14.

=== Foro Italico cluster ===
- Centrale del tennis - Water Polo (9,000)
- Stadio Olimpico del Nuoto - Swimming, Synchronized Swimming, Modern Pentathlon (swimming) (15,000)
- Stadio Pietrangeli - Diving (6,000)
- Stadio Olimpico - Athletics, Football, Ceremonies (70,634)

=== Fiera di Roma cluster ===
- Rome Expo - Fencing, Karate (9,500); Judo, Wrestling (9,300); Boxing (10,000); Table Tennis (7,000); Weightlifting, Sport Climbing (7,000); Badminton, Taekwondo (7,000)

=== Tor Vergata cluster ===
- Tor Vergata Sport Complex-Hall A - Basketball (18,000)
- Tor Vergata Sport Complex-Hall B - Handball (15,000)
- Cycling Arena - BMX Cycling, Track Cycling (6,000)
- Relocatable Arena - Gymnastics (artistic, trampoline), Volleyball (15,000)
- Tennis Centre - Tennis (15,000)
- Possible venues - Baseball, Softball, (5–8,000)
- Olympic Village

=== EUR cluster ===
- EUR Lake - Triathlon (27,500)
- Tre Fontane - Hockey (10,000)
- Palazzo dello Sport - Volleyball, Gymnastics (rhythmic) (10,000)

=== City Centre cluster ===
- Circo Massimo - Beach Volley (15,000)
- Roman Forum - Archery (7,000); Road Cycling, Marathon (6,000)
- Caracalla baths - Archery (preliminary stages) (3,000)

=== Other venues ===
- Natural Water Sports Park - Open Water Swimming, Canoe, Rowing (25,000)
- Villa Ada - Mountain Bike Cycling (27,000)
- Pratoni del Vivaro - Equestrian (eventing cross-country) (25,000)
- Piazza di Siena - Equestrian (15,000)
- Stadio Flaminio - Rugby Sevens, Modern Pentathlon (24,000)
- Palazzetto dello Sport - Volleyball (preliminary venue 2), Modern Pentathlon (fencing) (5 000)
- Tor di Quinto - Shooting (12,000)
- Marco Simone Golf and Country Club - Golf (28,000)
- Saxa Rubra - IBC/MPC

==== Sailing and Surfing ====
Cagliari was selected as hosting city for sailing and could host possible surfing events.

==== Football ====
The sports venues for the football tournaments

Final (with possible preliminaries and/or two semifinals):

- Rome: Stadio Olimpico - Existing (70,634)
- Rome: AS Roma Stadium - TBD, alternative venue for the Final (52,594 - expandable to 60,000)

Preliminary (with play-off matches):

- Milan: Stadio Giuseppe Meazza - Existing (80,000)
- Bari: Stadio San Nicola - Existing (58,270) (may need renovations)
- Naples: Stadio San Paolo - Existing (54,000) (renovation for 2019 Universiade)
- Florence: Stadio Artemio Franchi - Existing (46,366) (new stadium possible)
- Turin: Juventus Stadium - Existing (41,254)
- Verona: Stadio Marc'Antonio Bentegodi - Existing (39,211) (may need renovations)

Preliminary (only):

- Genoa: Stadio Luigi Ferraris - Existing (36,599)
- Bologna: Stadio Renato Dall'Ara - Existing (36,462) (may need renovations)
- Palermo: Stadio Renzo Barbera - Existing (36,349) (new stadium possible)
- Udine: Stadio Friuli - Existing (25,144 - expandable for 35,000)

== Logo ==
The logo was unveiled on Monday December 14, 2015 in a 90-minute special ceremony at the Palazzetto dello Sport, The logo was inspired by the colosseum with colors from the flag of Italy.

== Slogan ==
On May 27, 2016, the bid launched their website with the bid's slogan: "Trained For The Future, since 753 BC".

== Partners ==
Official partners which have already subscribed agreement to sustain Rome 2024 bid.

=== Main Partners ===
- Alitalia / Etihad Airways
- BNP Paribas
- Enel
- Eni
- Unipol

=== Friends ===
- STAR Group

=== Official Provider ===
- TicketOne
