= Konul Nurullayeva =

Azerbaijani politician (born 1985)

Konul Nurullayeva Könül Nurullayeva

Parliamentarian of the 6th convocation of the National Assembly of the Republic of Azerbaijan
- Incumbent
- Assumed office 2020
- President: Ilham Aliyev

Personal details
- Born: December 1, 1985 (age 40) Baku, Azerbaijan SSR, Soviet Union

Konul Oruj gizi Nurullayeva (December 1, 1985, Baku) is a parliamentarian of the 6th convocation of the National Assembly of the Republic of Azerbaijan Head of the International Relations Department of the National Olympic Committee of Azerbaijan (2009–2016), the member of the Committee on Gender Equality in Sports of ISSF since 2018, member of the executive committee of the Islamic Solidarity Sports Federation, Head of the Azerbaijani delegation at the Winter Olympic Games Vancouver 2010 and Sochi 2014, Executive Director of the “Baku 2020” Organizing Committee, Secretary of the Organizing Committee of the Islamic Solidarity Games “Baku 2017”, first vice-president of the World Alpagut Federation since 2022, member of the Azerbaijani delegation to the Parliamentary Assembly of the Council of Europe (PACE), Head of the working group on Azerbaijani-Croatian Interparliamentary relations, Head of the Youth Interparliamentary Assembly of the CIS member states.

== Early life and education ==
Konul Nurullayeva was born in Baku on December 1, 1985. In 1992–2000, she studied at the secondary school named after N. Tusi. In 2000–2003, she continued her education at the secondary school No.6, from which she graduated. In 2003–2007, she studied at the Faculty of International Relations of the Azerbaijan University of Languages and graduated with a degree in International Relations. In 2009, she received a master's degree with distinction in the same specialty. Since September 2019, she has been studying in the MBA Program at the Swiss Business Institute.

== Career ==
=== National Assembly (Milli Majlis) ===
During the election of parliamentarians of the 6th convocation of the National Assembly of the Republic of Azerbaijan held on February 9, 2020, Konul Nurullayeva was elected as the Member of Parliament from Nizami District First Constituency No.24 as a politically neutral candidate. She is a member of the Committees on “Family, Women, and Children” and “Youth and Sports” of the National Assembly, as well as the Head of the working group on Azerbaijani-Croatian Inter-parliamentary Relations.

Starting from April 2020, Konul Nurullayeva is a member of the Azerbaijani delegation to the Parliamentary Assembly of the Council of Europe (PACE). She represents Azerbaijan in the PACE Committees on “Social Relations, Health, and Sustainable Development” and “Equality and Non-Discrimination”.

=== Youth Movements ===
Konul Nurullayeva was a Member of the advisory board of the “IRELI” Nationwide Youth Movement - one of the largest youth organizations in Azerbaijan, founded in 2005. In 2008, she was the Chairman of the Organizing Committee for the reorganization of the “IRELI” Public Union and a member of the Board of the new organization. Being one of the first members of the Youth Parliament of Azerbaijan, she actively participated in the various debates.

=== Work in Sports ===
During her work period in the field of sports, Konul Nurullayeva has led several sports projects. That includes the Regional Forum of NOC Leaders of CIS and Baltic States, Congress of the European Fair Sports Movement, European Qualifying Competition for Athletics of the Youth Olympic Games, “Baku 2014" European Athletics Convention, 43rd General Assembly of the European Olympic Committee, to mention a few. Along with that, when Azerbaijan filed a bid to host the “Baku 2020” Summer Olympic Games, Konul Nurullayeva was executive director of the Organizing Committee. In 2009–2016, she was a member of the executive committee of the Azerbaijan Athletics Federation and worked as a Head of the International Relations Department of the Federation. In 2022, she was elected the first vice-president of the World Alpagut Federation.

She served as a Deputy Head of the Azerbaijani delegation during the European Youth Olympic Festivals in Tampere, Finland in 2009 and Trabzon, Turkey in 2011. At the same time, Ms. Nurullayeva was Assistant Head of the delegation of Azerbaijan at the Beijing Olympic Games in 2008 and the deputy head of the Azerbaijani delegation at the London Summer Olympic Games in 2012. In 2010, she was the first-ever woman in Azerbaijan's history of the sport to be appointed as Chef de Mission of the Azerbaijani delegation at the 2010 Winter Olympic Games in Vancouver. During the next Winter Olympic Games held in Sochi, Russia in 2014, Konul Nurullayeva executed the same mission. In 2015, she became the head of the Azerbaijani delegation at the Baku 2015 European Games, which were held in Azerbaijan for the first time.

=== International representation ===
In 2013, during the meeting of the executive committee of the Islamic Solidarity Sports Federation, Konul Nurullayeva has become the first-ever female member elected to the Federation since 1963. During the 4th Islamic Solidarity Games in 2017, she was appointed as the Secretary of the Organizing Committee, as well as the Head of the Department of Relations with the Islamic Solidarity Sports Federation and the National Olympic Committees in the Operational Committee, established to organize the Islamic Solidarity Games in Azerbaijan. On November 19, 2017, during the meeting of the 26th Executive Committee of the Islamic Solidarity Sports Federation, Konul Nurullayeva was elected as a member of the executive committee for the second time. In 2018, she was appointed as Head of the Committee on “Women and Gender Equality in Sports”, established within the ISSF at the same meeting. She is also a member of the Coordination Council established by ISSF in connection with the "5th Islamic Solidarity Games" to be held in Turkey in 2021.

Since 2020, Konul Nurullayeva is the Country Ambassador to the “Women Political Leaders Global Network” and the first-ever representative in the “Global Council on Tolerance and Peace” Organization from Azerbaijan.
