= Baku bid for the 2020 Summer Olympics =

2020 Olympics bid by Baku, Azerbaijan

Bids for the 2020 Summer Olympics
Overview
- Games of the XXXII Olympiad

Details
- City: Baku, Azerbaijan
- Chair: Yaqub Eyyubov
- NOC: National Olympic Committee of Azerbaijan

Previous Games hosted
- None

Baku 2020 (Azerbaijani: 'Bakı 2020') was a bid for the 2020 Summer Olympics by the city of Baku and the National Olympic Committee of Azerbaijan. Bids were also placed by Doha, Istanbul, Madrid, Rome (which later cancelled its bid) and the chosen host city of Tokyo.

== History ==
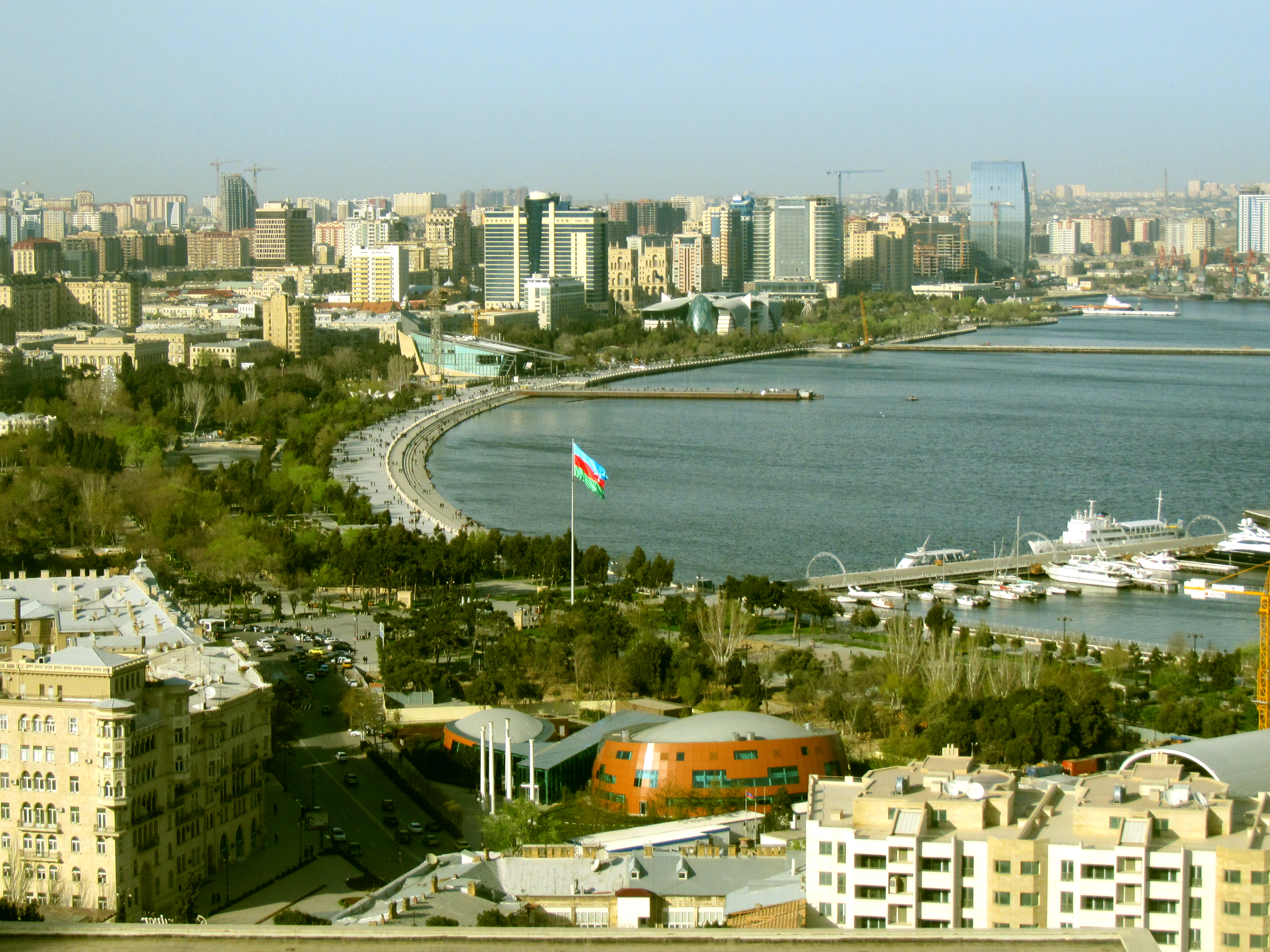
View of Baku

It was announced on September 1, 2011 that Baku submitted a bid to host the 2024 Olympics. Baku bid to host the 2016 Summer Olympics but failed to become a candidate. Those games ultimately were awarded to Rio de Janeiro. Baku's 2020 bid was their second bid. On September 13, 2011 it was announced that Azerbaijan's Deputy Prime Minister Yagub Eyubov would head the Baku 2020 bid. Youth and Sports Minister Azad Rahimov claimed that Baku would be ready to stage the 2020 Olympics by 2016 citing that many sports facilities would have been built. Baku is already building an Olympic Stadium as well as an Olympic complex which will include a pool. On October 20, 2011, the Russian Olympic Committee announced that they supported Baku's bid.

In their campaign to host the 2020 Summer Olympic Games, Baku's bid committee appointed three leading international agencies; pmplegacy, Burson-Marsteller and Adore Creative in November 2011. Later on that month, Baku 2020 appointed Konul Nurullayeva to be the CEO of the Baku 2020 Bid Committee. Baku 2020 has hired a team of experts to help them with their bid. One of the experts they have hired is Bob Elphinston who was the general manager of Sydney's successful bid to host the 2000 Summer Olympics. In December 2011, Baku 2020 revealed their bid logo. The logo is inspired by carpets which are an important product which is commonly made in Azerbaijan. The slogan of the bid is "Together We Can".

Prior to the start of the 2012 Winter Youth Olympics, Baku 2020 announced the opening of a new ski resort in Azerbaijan. It will be the first major ski resort in the country. Baku 2020 CEO Konul Nurullayeva said it will compel Azerbaijan to send athletes to the 2016 Winter Youth Olympics and to the Winter Olympics in the future. Azerbaijan President Ilham Aliyev has declared 2012 as a "year of sport" which will help promote the Olympic Movement in the country as well as promote Baku's Olympic bid.

The bid enjoyed high public support. A poll conducted in December 2011 revealed that 95% of the country supported the bid and 93% of those polled felt that hosting the games would have a positive impact on sports in Azerbaijan.

Baku submitted their application file to the IOC on February 1, 2012. The National Assembly of Azerbaijan voted to endorse the bid in February 2012.

It was announced in March 2012 that Azerbaijan and Georgia were interested in bidding to co-host the UEFA Euro 2020 Championship. Azerbaijan decided to keep their focus on the Baku Olympic bid. As a result, Georgia has submitted a bid to host UEFA Euro 2020.

Baku 2020 hired Helios Partners as a bid consultant in April 2012. Helios Partners was set to work with Rome's 2020 bid but the bid was withdrawn. Helios Partners played a role in the winning bids by Sochi and Pyeongchang for the 2014 and 2018 Winter Olympics respectively.

=== Outlook, conclusion and future ===
Baku failed to become a Candidate City when the IOC selected the candidate cities on May 23, 2012. After Baku failed to become a candidate, Azerbaijan joined forces with neighboring Georgia in a bid to host UEFA Euro 2020. However, this plan failed when UEFA announced that UEFA Euro 2020 would be held across Europe in multiple countries. It has been stated that Baku would bid again for the 2024 Summer Olympics.

Baku hosted the 2015 European Games which were the first European Games to be held.

Tokyo was ultimately elected as the host city of the 2020 Summer Olympics at the 125th IOC Session in Buenos Aires, Argentina.

== Overview ==
The city hosted many sporting events, including the Rhythmic Gymnastics European Championships in 2007 and 2009, the 2005 World Rhythmic Gymnastics Championships, 2007 FILA Wrestling World Championships and 2010 European Wrestling Championships, the 2011 World Amateur Boxing Championships, 2009 Women's Challenge Cup and the European Taekwondo Championships in 2007. As of 2011, the city annually hosts WTA tennis event called Baku Cup. The city hosted the 2012 FIFA U-17 Women's World Cup and hosted the Eurovision Song Contest 2012.

=== Venues ===
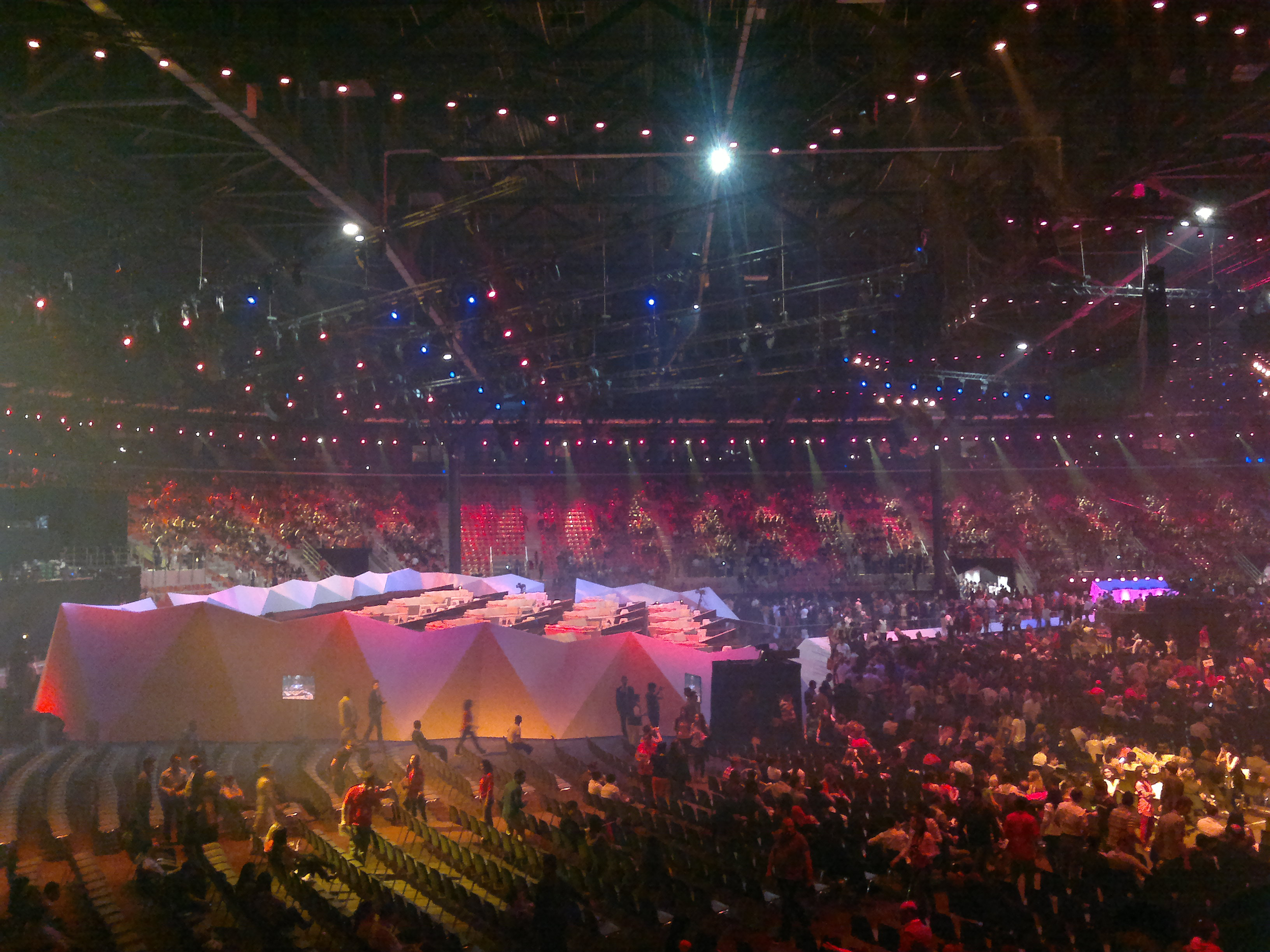
Baku Crystal Hall, where Judo and Wrestling would have been held

In Baku's 2016 bid, their venue proposals received low scores due to Baku's lack of sufficient sports facilities at the time. Baku's 2020 bid consisted of a four cluster concept that includes competition and non competition venues. Since Baku's 2016 bid, Baku has invested in the construction of new sports venues that can be used during an Olympic Games. Baku Olympic Stadium, the largest stadium in Azerbaijan, was completed in 2015. The Stadium is able to seat 68,700 people. Baku has embarked on construction of a hockey arena, a wrestling arena, and a training center. Baku is also building a new aquatics center.

=== Accommodations ===
Between May 2011 and May 2012 a total of eight five-star hotels in Baku have opened.

== See also ==
- Baku bid for the 2016 Summer Olympics
- Azerbaijan at the Olympics
- Soviet Union at the Olympics
