= Mario Pescante =

Italian politician and entrepreneur

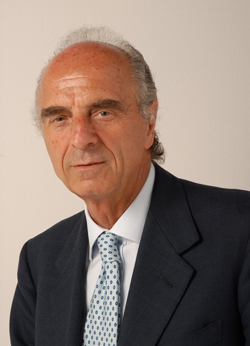

Member of the Chamber of Deputies
- In office 2001–2013
- Constituency: XV - Lazio 1

Personal details
- Born: 7 July 1938 (age 88) Avezzano, Italy
- Party: The People of Freedom
- Profession: Entrepreneur; Politician

Mario Pescante (born 7 July 1938 in Avezzano) is an Italian politician and entrepreneur. He is a former member of the International Olympic Committee (IOC).

== Biography ==
Pescante began his career as a university sports manager and was appointed secretary general of the Italian National Olympic Committee (CONI) in 1973. He served as Italy's chef de mission for seven Summer Olympics and five Winter Olympics. In 1993, Pescante was elected president of CONI. He resigned in October 1998 over a doping scandal.

He served as vice president of the Association of National Olympic Committees from 2001 to 2006. He teaches sports law at LUISS University in Rome and has authored numerous publications. In 2009, he became the first Italian to become a vice president of the IOC.

In February 2011, he was chosen to head Rome's bid for the 2020 Summer Olympics, however the bid was withdrawn due to the lack of government support.

In January 2014, Pescante publicly opposed the decision of United States president Barack Obama to include four openly homosexual athletes in their Olympic delegation.

Pescante was a member of the IOC and retired at the end of 2018, as per protocol, having turned 80 during the year.

== Political career ==
Pescante is a member of the People of Freedom party, and has been a member of the Italian Chamber of Deputies since 2001. He served as an undersecretary of the Ministry of Cultural Heritage and Activities under prime minister Silvio Berlusconi from 2001 to 2006. At present, he is the president of the 14th Commission of the Chamber of Deputies (in charge of European Union affairs).
