= Giacinto Auriti =

Italian lawyer, essayist, and politician

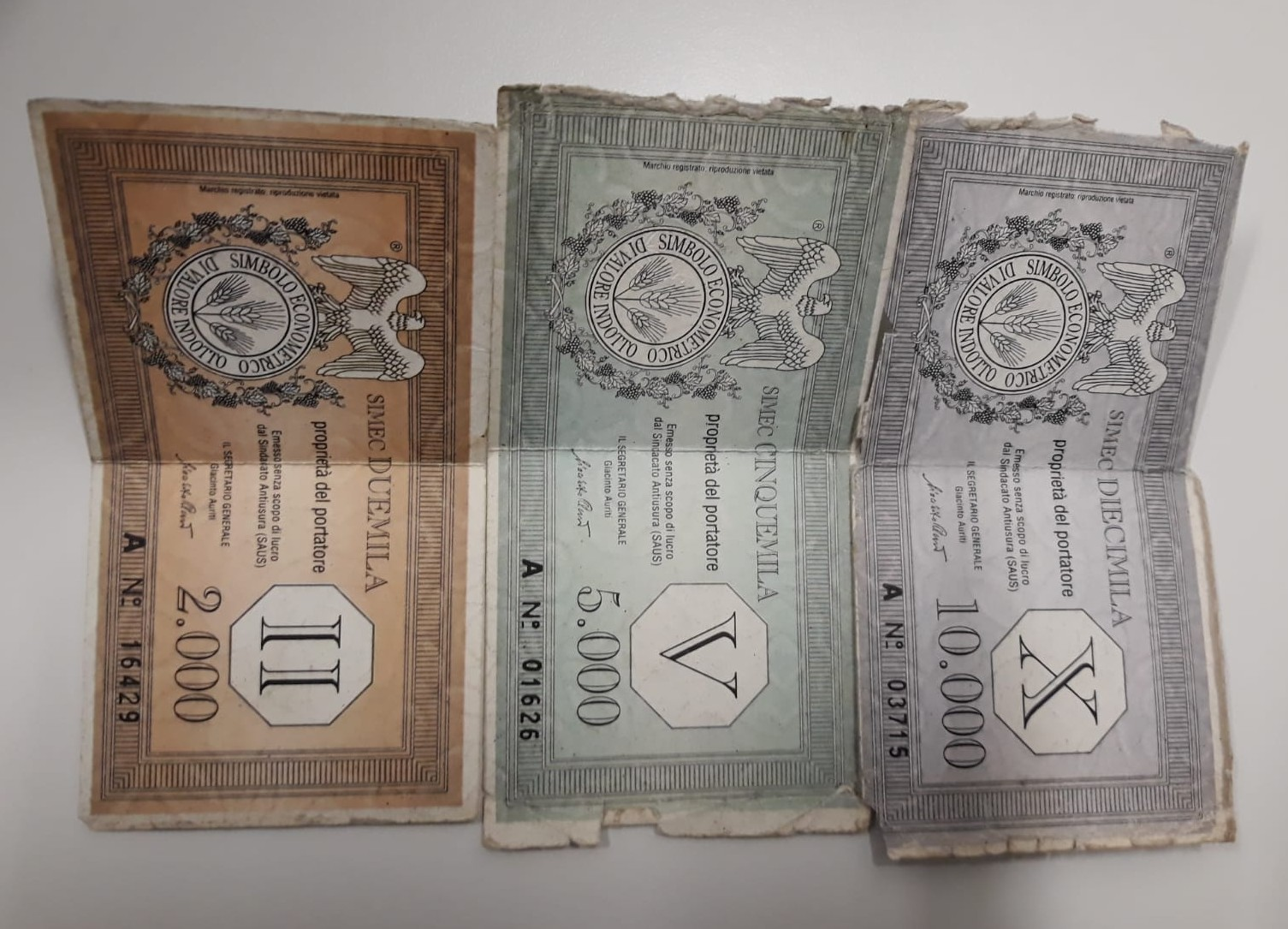
- SIMEC alternative currency
- Born: 10 October 1923; Guardiagrele, Kingdom of Italy
- Died: 11 August 2006 (aged 82); Rome, Italy
- Occupations: Lawyer, essayist, political Italian

Giacinto Auriti (10 October 1923 – 11 August 2006) was an Italian lawyer, essayist, and politician. He became famous for his monetary theory on seigniorage, which sees money from a different view - one that is of the jurisprudence. His idea theorized why currency has value and why it must be issued by governments and not banks. This idea led to many public initiatives such as the reform of the private banking system and the Bank of Italy.

== Biography ==
Giacinto Auriti was born on 10 October 1923. He graduated in Rome, where he also became an academic, teaching Maritime, International, Private, and Comparative Law. Auriti was among the founding teachers and was the dean of the faculty of law at the University of Teramo, established in 1993. He was the author of several texts on the subject of Maritime Law.

In the last period of his life, despite never having formally studied economic theory, he started teaching the subject and covering topics raised by the American poet Ezra Pound. He pioneered monetary law as an academic discipline at the University of Teramo—developing an economic theory that outlines how currency - as a measure of value and as such conventionally accepted by those who use it as a medium of exchange - is a "tool" for the exchange of goods (the theory of the induced value of money). His theory is that those who accept the convention of a currency's value, have the right to own it at its inception (the people's ownership of money). In this sense, the central banks are private corporations, who according to Auriti derive undue profits from seigniorage on the issue of paper money, assuming responsibility for an important source of public debt. This theory draws more power from the abolition of the direct relationship between money (convertible into gold) and gold reserve, established by the Bretton Woods initiative launched by the Richard Nixon administration on 15 August 1971. It, thereafter, transformed the business of issuing currency and further emphasized the conventional nature of monetary value created by the acceptance by the people of this convention.

== The SAUS and the Bank of Italy ==
In the '90s, Giacinto Auriti conducted a series of initiatives as Secretary General of the "Union of Anti-Usury" (SAUS) and as a legal representative of the cultural association, "Alternative social property of people". One of his initiatives was a request filed before the Court of Rome asking for the currency, at the time of issuance, to be owned by the Italian citizens. He also questioned the legality of the then-existing system of monetary emission, leading to the transformation of the Central Bank as the managing body responsible for monetary values and policy.

Auriti's theory viewed the issued banknotes as mere promissory notes and false bills of exchange issued by the banks. It was considered false because the bank promised gold that it did not have. Instead of gold, Auriti argued that the currency has an induced value and prediction value, which are created by social convention.

The Bank of Italy opposed the request. Consequently, Auriti wrote, "The vision of the currency and monetary functions which the petitioner intends to credit is clearly distorted and completely unfounded" ... "Acceptance by the community, far from being due to the value of the coin, it is really just the effect, so the syllogism must be reversed; it is true that the currency is accepted as true, but if anything, as the story and the news are demonstrating that it is only accepted as having value. Hence the need for this value, responding to a fundamental public interest, should be defended and guaranteed by public authorities, were assigned to function in modern central banks."

The Bank of Italy posited that the coinage is an expression of state sovereignty, and therefore "the value of the currency draws its basis only and only by rules of the road, which, usually, regulate in detail the creation and circulation of currency shall stipulate the discharging effect, punishing the failure to accept it as payment and protect the public trust against the falsification and alteration."

On the question of ownership of the money raised by Auriti in the same proceeding, the Bank of Italy said: "The question is then plaintiff, even in substance, devoid of the slightest foundation." Because it is based on "the premise is completely wrong" missing "in our law a law stating that the owner of the coin on the issue." The appropriation of money by the Bank of Italy, the argument of the Bank, in Auriti "is based on a tradition of interpretation in violation of law."

But, notes the Bank, "tickets just produced by the workshop production of the Bank of Italy are a mere commodity owned by the Central Bank, who is directly printing and assume the related costs (Article 4, paragraph 5 of Act no. 204/1910)". Purchasing function and the value of money only when the Bank of Italy markets them and transfers the property to the recipients.

The entry ticket is with operations that the Bank independently concluded "with the Treasury, with the banks, with foreign countries and with the money and capital markets, provided all operations and fully regulated by law and the Statute of the Bank of Italy (Articles 25 to 42 of the Act no. 204/1910 and Articles. from 41 to 53 of the Statute)".

So-called "abnormal and far-fetched" theory Auriti for which "there is a tradition of interpretation in violation of law, under which the central bank when they issue mutual Italian State and the National Collective, all the money puts into circulation." The coin is placed in the market according to operations under and governed by law, with which the Bank of Italy transfers ownership of the tickets. These assets are recorded as assets or liabilities in the accounts of the Bank which purchases or receives in return pledge assets or securities (bonds, currencies, etc.) That end up as an asset. In addition, the Official Gazette, as required by law, such transactions monthly reports.

Adds that the Bank considered that it itself must bear the cost of manufacture of the tickets and stamp duty, while the annual profits, made withdrawals and distributions mentioned in Article 54 of the Statute are donated to the State pursuant to art. 23 of Act no. 204/1910, shows "the absolute inconsistency and absurdity of the thesis" of Auriti, according to which "the supply of money would be made by the Bank of Italy, charging the state and society at large the full amount without consideration." Therefore, the Bank concludes, "there is no experience of anything arbitrary or unlawful within the prerogatives exercised by the Central Bank in the monetary field, because, contrary to what is alleged by the plaintiff, the whole subject is fully regulated by the legislature, so assigned or that any matter relating to the exercise of the function of emission can be said to be regulated by customs interpret and, least of all, by customs violation of law."

The request was rejected and the Court condemned Auriti to pay the legal costs.

Following two bills, on 11 January 1995, presented by Senator Luigi Natali and signed by 17 other Senators of the Republic are part of five different parties, ranging from Communist Refoundation to the National Alliance and on 11 February 1997, by Senator Antonino Monteleone of the National Alliance, Auriti's thesis was implemented, even if the Senate does not discuss anything, as totally baseless.

== The Experiment of SIMeC ==
In 2000, Auriti together with the help of mayor of the Democratic Party Mario Palmerio conducted an experiment in his hometown Guardiagrele by launching an alternative currency known as SIMeC, in order to prove his theories on the creation of value of a currency by nationality. The experiment developed in two phases. First, the starter served to enter the SIMeC-use community that induced value that objectifies as a real asset, being owned by the carrier making it a parallel currency. Second, was the creation of an Income for the Department of Citizenship to promote 'initiative', which was moderately successful because SIMeC were sold at par in exchange for pounds and withdrawn twice the original value. The costs were borne by the same Giacinto Auriti. Following an intervention by the Guardia di Finanza on a disposition of the Prosecutor of Chieti, the SIMeC in circulation, however, were confiscated. Despite the subsequent lifting of the seizure, the experiment was stopped.

The Syndicate in 2001, promoted a bill of popular initiative ("Acceptance of EURO: basic income owned by the carrier") but did not collect the necessary signatures.

In 2004, he ran for the elections to the European Parliament on the list "Social Alternative" by Alessandra Mussolini.

On 30 May 2011, Auriti's theories were repeatedly referenced in the parliament by Antonio Di Pietro, who was asking for assistance in European fora.
