= Memphy =

American DJ (born 2000)

Memphis Murphy is a New York-based DJ and model.

== Work ==
Memphy has DJ'd for Madonna's Pride party at Terminal 5, FIST at The Knockdown Center's Basement, Maison Margiela x Gentle Monster, Calvin Klein and SYKY at UnderPUBLIC at the Public Hotel, Intima at the Market Hotel, Bossa Nova Civic Club, amongst others. She has DJ'd alongside Bearcat, Bapari, Goth Jafar, ANTPUKE, Fashion, and more. Memphy was a member of the DJ collective New World Dysorder. Honey Dijon named Memphy, Infiniti, and Dangerous Rose as young trans artists “who are making space, unapologetically and fiercely.”

She has modeled for Savage x Fenty, Hood by Air, Dion Lee, and Mugler.

In April 2023, she appeared alongside Beyoncé in French Vogue in an editorial and campaign for the musician’s collaboration with Balmain.
