= Andrea Romano (politician) =

Italian politician

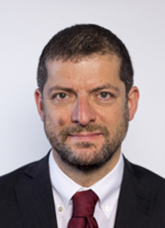

Member of the Chamber of Deputies
- In office 15 March 2013 – 13 October 2022

Personal details
- Born: 10 May 1967 (age 59) Livorno, Italy
- Party: PDS (1994–1996); IF (2009–2013); SC (2013–2014); PD (since 2014)
- Education: University of Pisa
- Profession: Politician, University professor

Andrea Romano (born 10 May 1967 in Livorno) is an Italian politician.

== Biography ==
Andrea Romano attends secondary school by the Salesians in his hometown, Livorno, then he graduated in Pisa and obtained a research doctorate in Crisis and transformation of society in Turin.

Later he moved to Moscow, where he learned Russian, to deepen his studies on the formation of the Stalinist system of the 1930s and on the relations between the Bolshevik party and rural society. Subsequently he returned to his homeland as a researcher for the Fondazione Istituto Gramsci, where he worked from 1993 to 1998.

=== Political career ===
From 1994 to 1996 he joined the Democratic Party of the Left, supporting the social democratic political and liberal line of the secretary Massimo D'Alema.

During the first and second D'Alema governments he collaborated with the Undersecretary for Foreign Affairs Umberto Ranieri.

Since 2009 he is Associate Professor of Contemporary History at the University of Rome Tor Vergata.

From 2009 to 2013 he was member of Italia Futura, a think tank chaired by Luca Cordero di Montezemolo.

He also wrote for L'Unità, Il Post, La Stampa, Il Riformista and Il Sole 24 Ore.

In the 2013 general election he was elected MP among the ranks of Civic Choice, the political party led by Mario Monti. In 2014 he left Civic Choice to join the Democratic Party. In 2018 he has been re-elected member of the Chamber of Deputies.
