= Goth Jafar =

New York-based DJ

Suffy Baala (born June 1997), known as Goth Jafar, is a New York-based DJ. She is signed by Discwomen in New York.

== Work ==
Goth Jafar blends a mix of hardcore techno, trance, pop and hip hop and she performs regularly with the collective Club Carry. She has spun at a number of venues and nightlife staples including the Anonymous hosted-party, Chromatic, Brooklyn's LadyLand, Los Angeles-based Heav3n, PC Music's Club Quarantine, and Sweden's Norbergfestival.

Goth Jafar has performed sets alongside Memphy, Tama Gucci, A.G. Cook, River Moon, Ashland Mines (fka Total Freedom), Boyfriend.dick, Jimmy Edgar, LYDO, SHYGIRL, Namasenda, BABYNYMPH, and Planningtorock, amongst others. She also performed an opening set for Beyoncé's Renaissance World Tour in Houston, Texas.
