= Michel Martone =

Italian academic

Deputy Minister for Labour and Welfare
- In office 29 November 2011 – 28 April 2013
- President: Giorgio Napolitano
- Preceded by: Ferruccio Fazio
- Succeeded by: Maria Cecilia Guerra

Personal details
- Born: 8 January 1974 (age 52) Nice, France
- Education: La Sapienza University of Rome
- Website: Official website

Michel Martone (born 8 January 1974 in Nice) is an Italian jurist and academic. He was Deputy Minister for Labor and Welfare from 29 November 2011 to 28 April 2013. On his first assignment, his delegations were active and passive labor market policies, youth employment, vocational training, industrial and labor relations.

He was the youngest member in the Government led by Mario Monti, a government of technocrats in the wake of the Italian debt crisis. He is full professor of labor Law and teaches at the Italian National School of Government, at the University of Teramo and at the LUISS Guido Carli University of Rome. He was visiting fellow at Cornell University's School of Industrial and Labor Relations. As research subjects, Martone deals with industrial relations, labor law, labor market, social security, youth and welfare issues.

== Biography and academic career ==
Michel Martone is a French native speaker. In 1997 Michel Martone graduated in law at La Sapienza University of Rome. and in the same year he obtained the PhD at the University of Modena.

In 2000 he became a researcher at the University of Teramo and the following year he became an associate professor of labor law at the Faculty of Law of the same university. In 2003 he won the open competition for a full professor position at the University of Siena, thus falling in the 1.5% of under 40 Italian full professors. and since 2005 he is full professor of Labor Law at the Law Faculty of the University of Teramo.

He is full professor at the Italian National School of Government and professor of Labor Law at the Law Faculty of LUISS Guido Carli University of Rome. At the same university he taught at the School of Government for the master's degree in Italian Political Affairs.

Lawyer of the Court of Rome, he is qualified at the defense among Supreme Courts.

He is chief editor of the magazine Argomenti di diritto del lavoro, member of the editorial board of the magazine Giurisprudenza Italiana, member of the scientific committee of Rivista degli infortuni e delle malattie professionali and editorialist and co-founder of the Magazine of politics and cultural analysis Zero. His articles are published on the Il Sole 24 Ore, on the Italian Huffington Post and Aspenia. Previously he published articles on Il Riformista and on Il Messaggero.

=== Deputy Minister for Labor and Welfare ===
On 28 November 2011 Martone was appointed as Deputy Minister of the Ministry of Labor and Welfare of the Government led by Mario Monti, he took the oath the following day. Areas delegated to him include active and passive labor market policies, youth employment, vocational training, industrial and labor relations. Upon mandate of Minister Elsa Fornero he followed much of the parliamentary activity regarding the labor market, industrial relations, social security and social safety nets.

More specifically, he followed the legislative process leading to the approval of the pensions reform and the decrees which led to the preservation of 140.000 s.c. safeguarded workers.

He took part in negotiations with social partners following the legislative process that lead to the approval of the government bill for a reform of the labor market (L. n. 92/2012) and to the adoption of the ministerial decree regarding the Agreement on Productivity.

In cooperation with the Ministry for Economic Development he was responsible for managing social safety nets and negotiations regarding industrial crises, such as Sulcis, Alcoa, Fiat, Ilva, Euroalluminia, Micron.

He oversaw the adoption of the Legislative Decree on temporary agency work.

He worked on issues relating to the governance and the renewal of several national collective contracts, including Air Transport and Local Public Transport.

== Policy advises and social activities ==
He was appointed Young Global Leader 2013 by the World Economic Forum and Former Aspen Junior Fellow by the Aspen Institute Italy and invited to participate at Aspen Seminar for Leaders in the US.

On behalf of the Labour Minister he drafted the Codice della Partecipazione, presented by the Government on 7 July 2010 and has been legal advisor of the Minister for Public Administration and Innovation.

He was a former member of the scientific committee for the administrative simplification and the reform of the employment relationship of civil servants set up in 2006 within the Cabinet of the Ministry of Public Administration

He was selected among the European Young Leaders – 40 Under 40.

He represented Italy in the board of directors of Eurofound, the Dublin Foundation established by the European Community to addresses the challenges of the industrial relations at continental level.

In 2004, Martone was secretary of the Scientific Committee for the drafting of the Workers' Statute set up within the Cabinet of the Ministry of Labor and Welfare.

== Relevant publications ==
- Governo dell'economia e azione sindacale, in Trattato di diritto commerciale e di diritto pubblico dell'economia, directed by F. Galgano, vol. XXXIX, Padua, CEDAM, 2006 (selected among the "Legal Science Books of the year" by the panel of Luigi Sturzo Institute, chaired by Prof. Giuliano Crifò). ISBN 9788813268992
- Contratto di lavoro e beni immateriali in the series published by the Institute for Private Law of the University of Rome "La Sapienza", n. 61, Padua, CEDAM, 2002. ISBN 9788813230777.
