= Lorenzo Martone =

Brazilian businessman

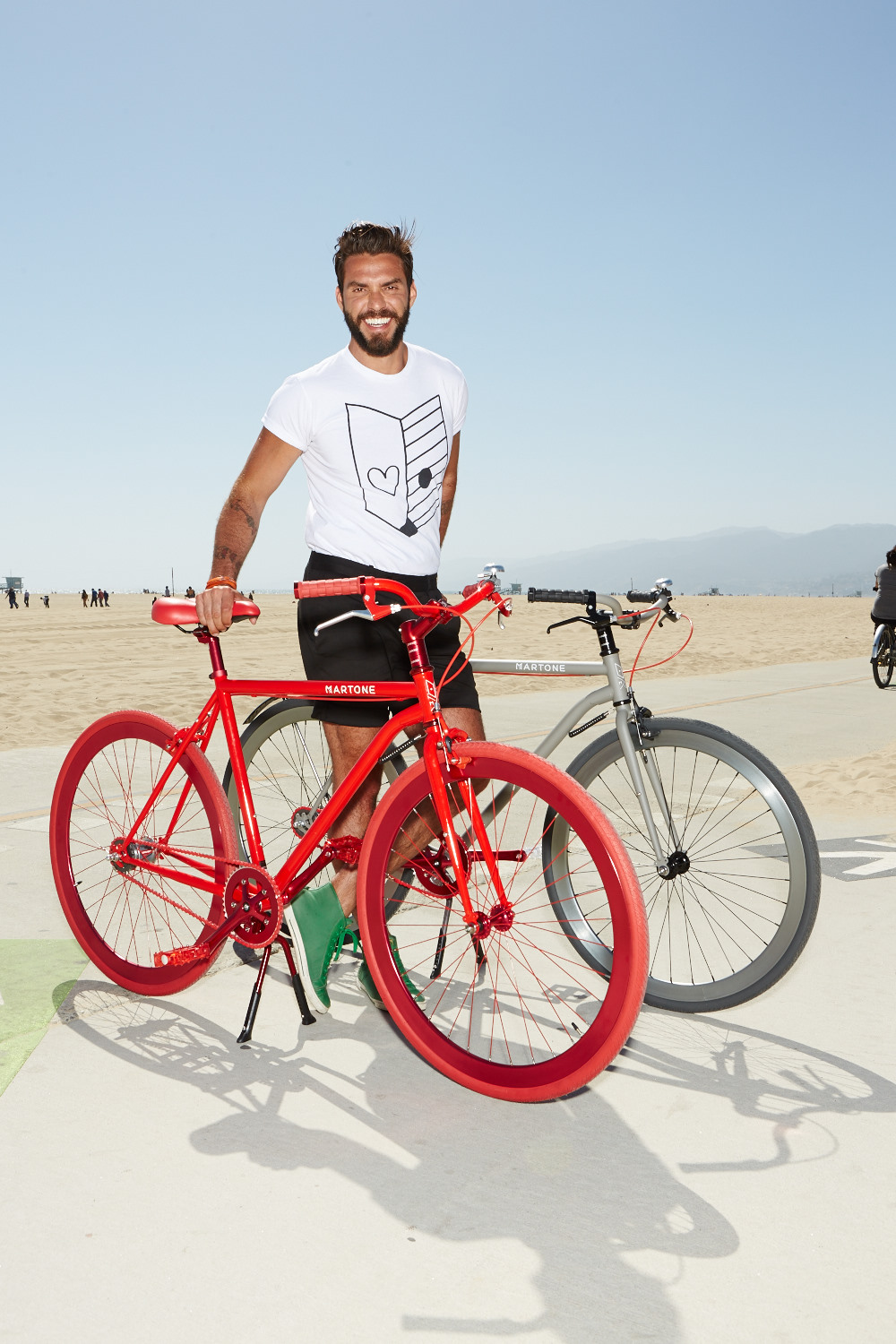
- Born: May 14, 1979 (age 47); São Paulo, Brazil
- Occupation: Entrepreneur
- Known for: founder of Martone Cycling Co

Lorenzo Martone (born May 1979) is an entrepreneur in the fashion industry. Martone was born in São Paulo, Brazil, and resides there now working with therapy’s . Martone founded the Martone Agency in New York, now known as The Creative NYC, designed a swimwear line called Nycked in 2010, and launched a line of designer bicycles with Martone Cycling Co in 2013.

== Early life and education ==
Born in São Paulo, Brazil, Martone has one younger brother and is the grandson of Italian immigrants. Martone's family is originally from Northern Italy, but his grandparents migrated to Brazil after World War II.

Martone attended private school in São Paulo. He spent one year during high school in Riverside, California when he was 15 years old as an exchange student. He attended university in São Paulo at Anhembi Morumbi studying tourism. Later Martone moved to Paris where he specialized in luxury brand advertising at ESG Management School.

== Career ==
Martone moved to New York City in 2008 and began working as the strategic planner for the ad agency Chandelier Creative. In 2009, Martone co-founded ARC NY with Ryan Brown—a talent agency that included clients such as Alessandra Ambrosio and Irina Shayk. The two partners decided to close the agency in 2011 and pursue separate ventures. Martone opened a fashion PR company called the Martone Agency shortly after. Since then, Caitlyn Shockley joined as partner and the company was renamed The Creative NYC and opened a showroom in Chelsea in May 2014.

Martone partnered with jewelry designer Jules Kim for his debut swimwear line called Nycked in November 2010.

=== Martone Cycling Co. ===
In 2013, Martone launched a line of bicycles with Martone Cycling Co. Having been dissatisfied with how previous bikes looked while being stored in his New York apartment, Martone was inspired by fashion when designing his own line of bicycles. The bikes come in monochromatic hues and feature matching tires, red chains, handlebar baskets, and a SRAM Duomatic gear hub for city riding. They were first available at the Paris boutique Colette and are now available at high end retail stores such as Saks Fifth Ave. Martone also collaborated with artist Justin Teodoro for the designs of the brand's accessory line.

== Personal life ==
Martone began dating designer Marc Jacobs in 2008. The couple became engaged in 2009, but eventually ended their relationship.

Martone considers his hobby of biking as part of his inspiration for the Martone Cycling Co designer bike line.
