= BlackBook =

American arts and culture magazine

- March 2011 cover
- Editor: Evanly Schindler
- Categories: Art; Entertainment; Fashion; Popular culture
- Founder: Evanly Schindler
- Founded: 1996
- Company: McCarthy LLC
- Country: United States
- Based in: New York City, New York, U.S.
- Language: English
- Website: https://blackbookpresents.com/

BlackBook is an arts and culture magazine published bi-annually to print and online. Founded by Evanly Schindler in 1996 as a quarterly print publication, covering topics ranging from art, music, and literature to politics, popular culture, and travel guides.

Since 2020 the brand’s daily coverage appears online as BlackBook Presents, whose Art + Impact projects include the 2022 Sotheby’s Los Angeles exhibition ‘‘A Woman’s Right to Pleasure’’.

== History ==
Schindler sold the magazine to Ari Horowitz in 2006. Vibe Holdings, whose investors include Ron Burkle and Magic Johnson, purchased the company in January 2012, forming Vibe Media. In June 2013, Vibe Media Holdings sold BlackBook to Schindler and Jon Bond of the ad agency Kirshenbaum Bond Senecal + Partners.
