= Luca di Montezemolo =

Italian businessman (born 1947)

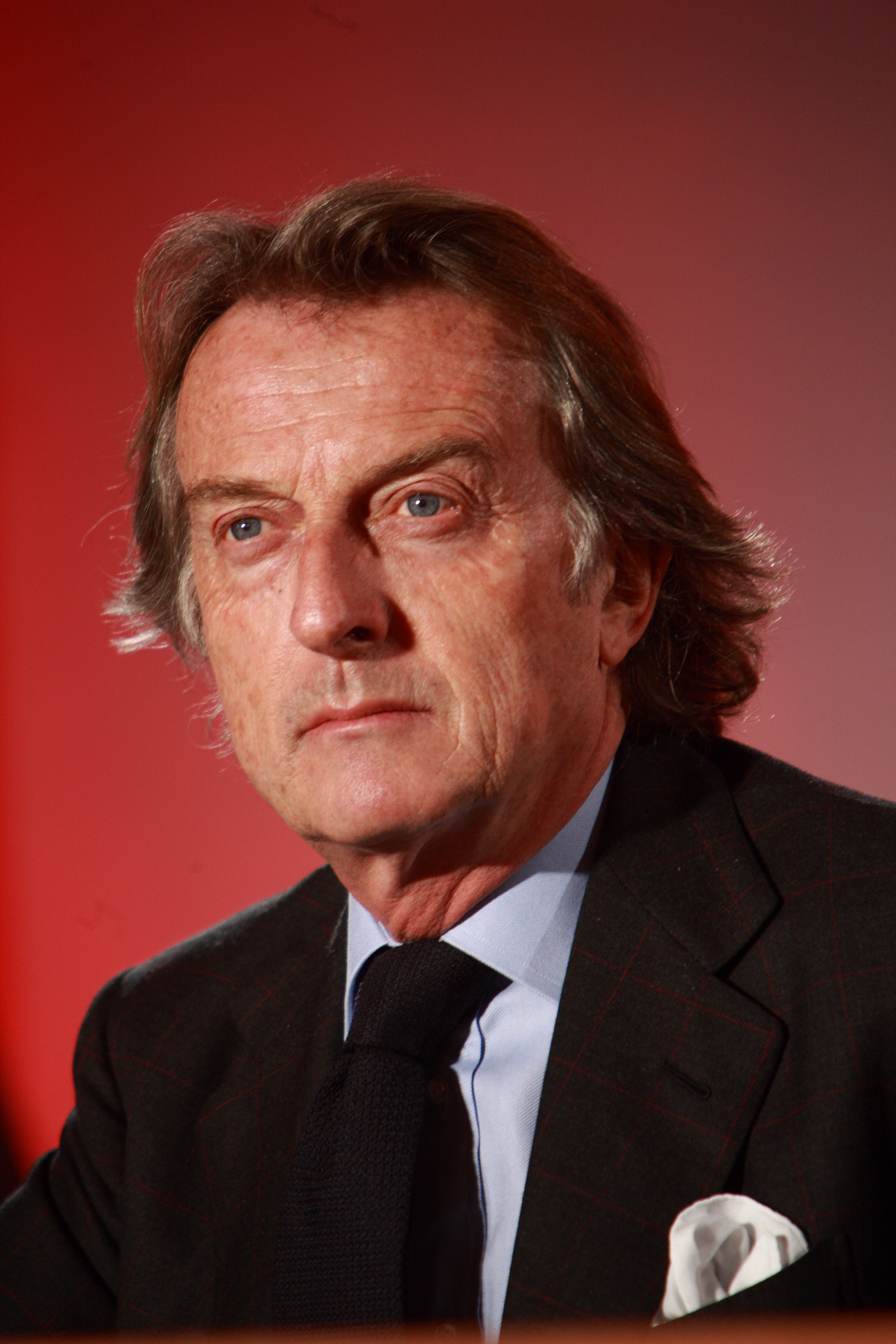
- Montezemolo in 2008
- Born: Luca Cordero di Montezemolo; 31 August 1947 (age 79); Bologna, Italy
- Education: Sapienza University; Columbia University
- Occupation: Businessman
- Known for: Former chairman of Ferrari S.p.A. and Fiat S.p.A.
- Spouse: Ludovica Andreoni (m. 2000; sep. 2018)
- Children: 5

Signature
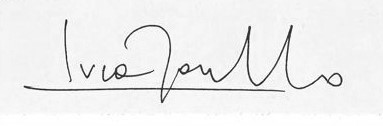

Luca Cordero di Montezemolo (Italian pronunciation: [ˈluːka korˈdɛːro di montedˈdzɛːmolo, -ˈdzeː-]; born 31 August 1947) is an Italian businessman and motorsport executive who is best known as the former chairman of Ferrari, Fiat S.p.A., Confindustria and Alitalia.

Montezemolo descends from an aristocratic family from the region of Piedmont in Italy. He is one of the founders and former president of NTV, an Italian company which is Europe's first private open access operator of 300 km/h (186 mph) high-speed trains.

In 2009, Montezemolo founded Future Italy, a free market think tank that joined Civic Choice in the 2013 Italian parliamentary election.

On 28 June 2025, he was reported to have been appointed as a director of McLaren Group Holdings Ltd.

== Early life and education ==
Luca di Montezemolo was born in Bologna, the youngest son of Massimo Cordero dei Marchesi di Montezemolo (1920–2009), a Piedmontese aristocrat whose family served the Royal House of Savoy for generations, and Clotilde Neri (1922–2017), niece of famed Italian surgeon Vincenzo Neri. His uncle, Admiral Giorgio Cordero dei Marchesi di Montezemolo (1918–1986) was a commander in the Regia Marina in World War II. His grandfather, Mario (1888–1960) and great-grandfather Carlo (1858–1943) were both generals in the Italian Army. He is also a relative of Andrea Cordero Lanza di Montezemolo (his father Massimo and Andrea were cousins), who became a cardinal in 2006.

His surname is actually "Cordero di Montezemolo" and the correct usage is either the full surname or just Montezemolo (omitting the "di"); Marchesi is a noble title meaning marquess and was borne by his father.

Montezemolo graduated with a degree in law from La Sapienza University in 1971. Afterwards, he studied for a master's degree in international commercial law at Columbia University.

== Career ==
=== Racing ===
Montezemolo's sporting career began at the wheel of a Giannini Fiat 500 which he raced together with his friend Cristiano Rattazzi. Later, Montezemolo briefly drove for the privately owned Lancia rally team known as HF Squadra Corse. He joined the auto manufacturing conglomerate FIAT S.p.A., headquartered in Torino.

=== Ferrari ===
In 1973 Luca di Montezemolo was invited by Enzo Ferrari to be his assistant. In 1974, he was appointed sporting director of the Scuderia. During his involvement with the team, Ferrari won the Formula One World Championship with Niki Lauda in 1975 and 1977.

=== Business ===
In 1976 Montezemolo was promoted to become head of all FIAT racing activities, and in 1977 he advanced to become a senior manager of FIAT. Throughout the 1980s, Montezemolo occupied a number of positions in the FIAT empire, including managing director of the drinks company Cinzano and director of the publishing company Itedi.

In 1982, Montezemolo managed the America's Cup challenge of Team Azzurra, the first Italian yacht club to enter the event. In 1985, he became manager of the Organizing Committee for 1990 World Cup Italia.

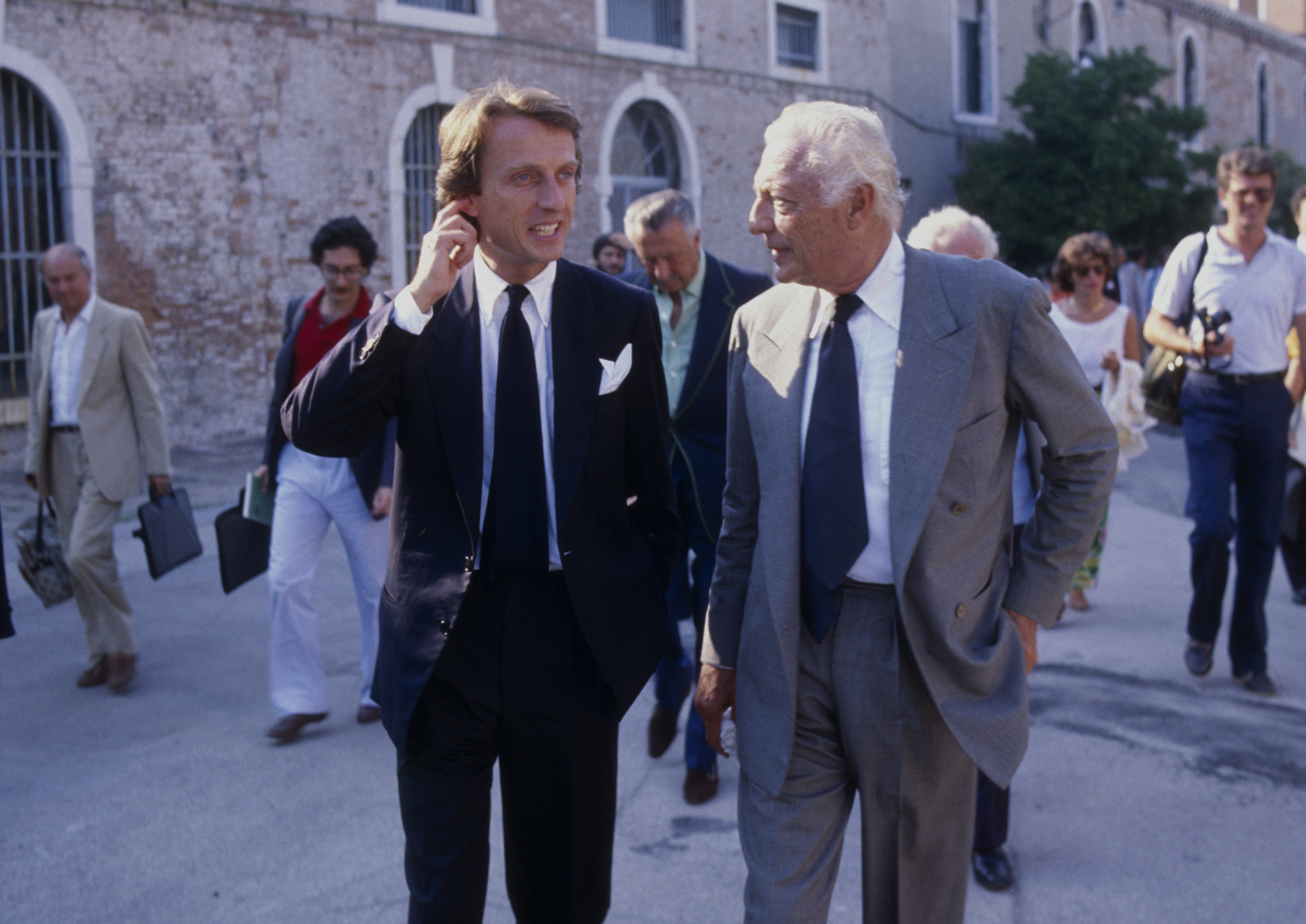
Montezemolo with Gianni Agnelli in 1985

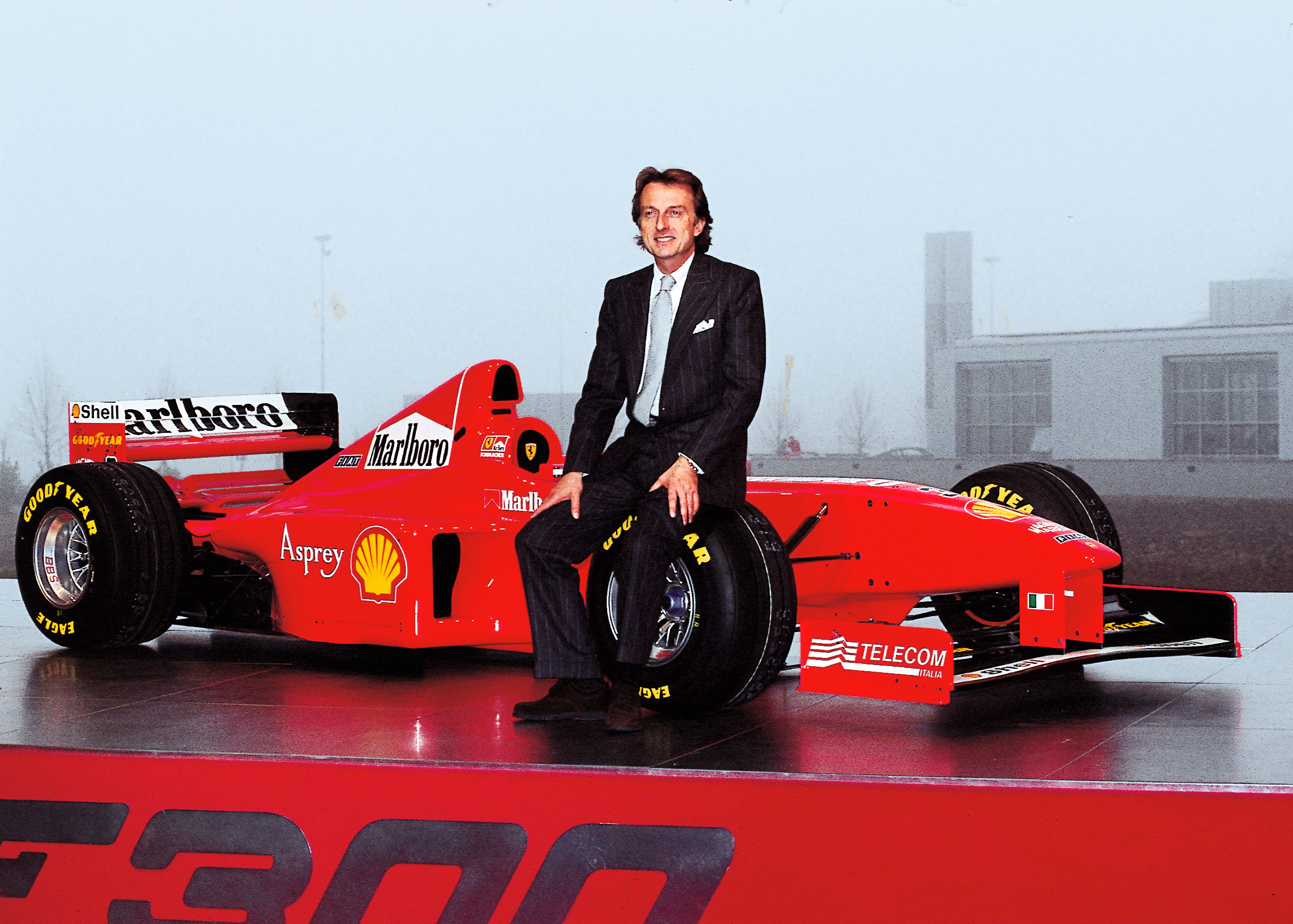
Luca di Montezemolo with a Ferrari F300 in 1998

=== Return to Ferrari ===
In November 1991, FIAT Chairman Gianni Agnelli appointed Montezemolo president of Ferrari, which had been struggling since Enzo Ferrari's death. Montezemolo made it his personal goal to win the Formula One World Constructors' Championship once again. Montezemolo quickly made changes at the Italian team, signing up Niki Lauda as a consultant and promoting Claudio Lombardi to the team manager role. During the 1990s he resurrected the Ferrari road car business from heavy debts into profit. He also took on the presidency of Maserati when Ferrari acquired it in 1997, until 2005.

Under Montezemolo and executive director Jean Todt, the Ferrari Formula One team won the World Drivers' Championship in 2000, the first time since 1979. The previous year, 1999, they had won the Constructors' Championship for the first time since 1983.

On 27 May 2004, Montezemolo became president of the Italian business lobby Confindustria. Days later, following the death of Umberto Agnelli on 28 May, he was elected chairman of Fiat S.p.A., Ferrari's parent company.

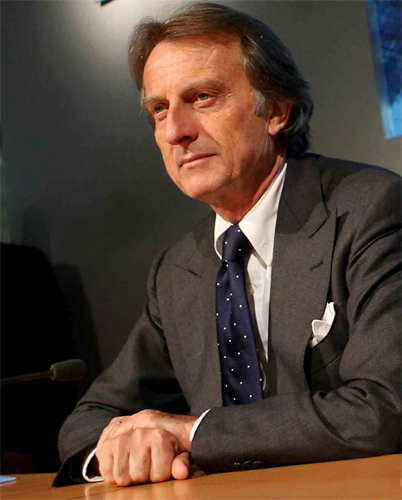
Luca di Montezemolo in 2008

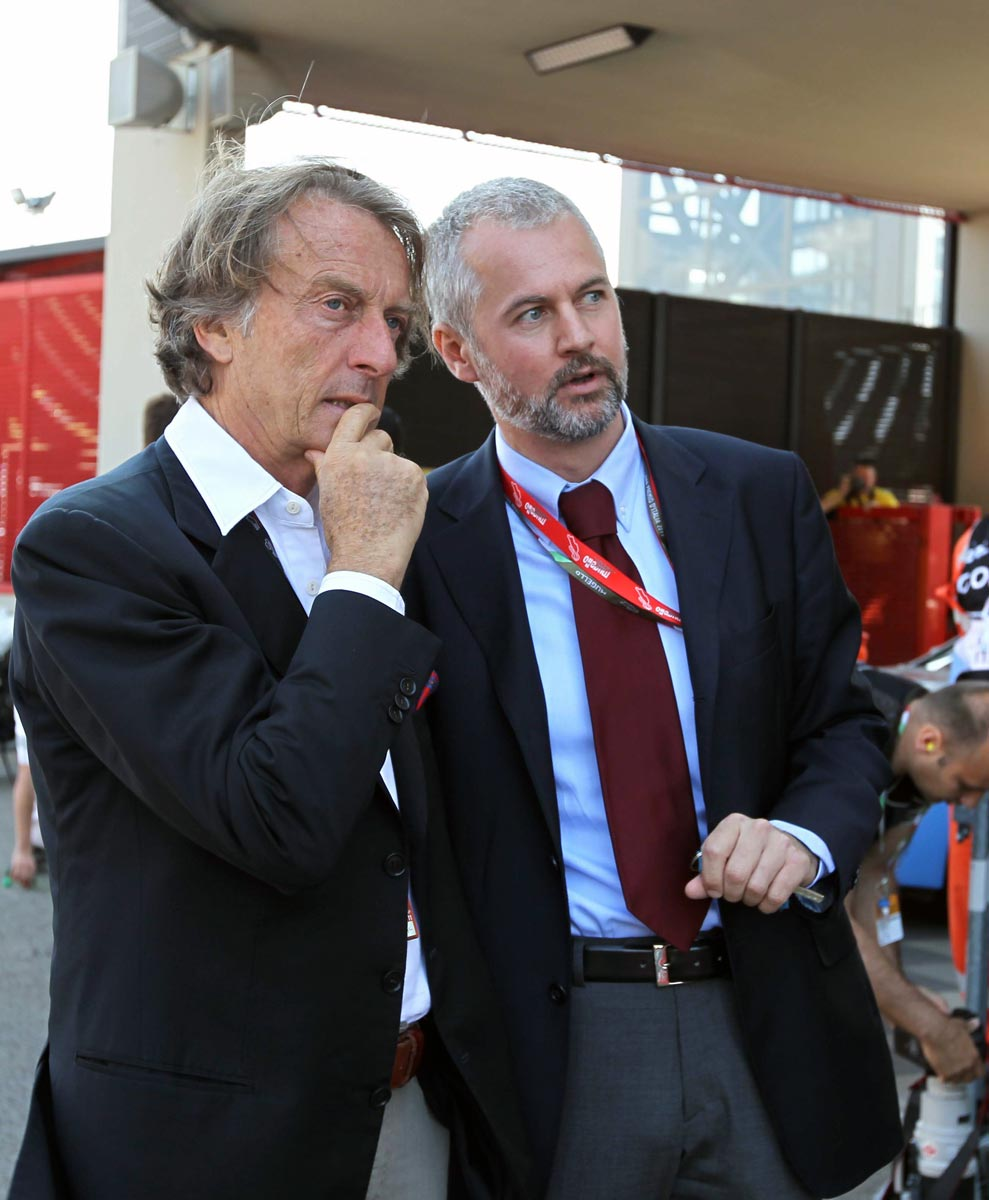
Montezemolo with Paolo Poli in 2012

On 29 July 2008, Montezemolo founded the Formula One Teams Association (FOTA) which he presided over from 2008 to 2010, eventually being replaced by McLaren CEO Martin Whitmarsh. The Committee used to meet on a regular basis to discuss improvements to Formula One. FOTA was formally dissolved in 2014.

Montezemolo's salary in 2010 was more than twice that of Fiat CEO Sergio Marchionne, making him the best-paid executive in the Fiat Group.

In April 2010, John Elkann replaced Montezemolo as Chairman of Fiat S.p.A.

On 10 September 2014, Montezemolo resigned as president and chairman of Ferrari and was replaced by FIAT Chrysler CEO, Sergio Marchionne in October.

== Other activities ==
Montezemolo has often been reported to have aspirations of a career in Italian politics, most recently the office of prime minister, but has always denied the rumours.

In February 2015, Montezemolo became committee president of the Rome bid for the 2024 Summer Olympics.

In April 2016, Montezemolo's name was mentioned in the Panama Papers.

== Corporate boards ==
- Tod's, Independent Member of the Board of Directors
- Alitalia, Non-Executive Chairman of the Board of Directors (2014–2017)
- Formula One, Non-Executive Member of the Board of Directors (1991–2014, 2014–present)
- UniCredit, Independent Member of the Board of Directors (2012–2017)
- Renova Group, Member of the Board of Directors (–2018)
- Nuovo Trasporto Viaggiatori, Member of the Board of Directors (–2012)
- McLaren Group Holdings Ltd (2025–present)

== Non-profit organizations ==
- LUISS, President (2004-2010)

== Recognition ==
In July 2015, Montezemolo was inducted into the Automotive Hall of Fame. He received the America Award of the Italy-USA Foundation in 2017.

== Personal life ==
Montezemolo lives primarily in Italy, with an apartment in Rome and a country estate outside Bologna.

He has five children, and has been married twice.

In 2012 Montezemolo was issued a suspended sentence of one year imprisonment by the court in Naples for the unauthorized construction of his personal residence in Anacapri, Italy.

In his spare time, Montezemolo is a sailor and has owned two motor yachts.

== Awards ==
Awards and achievements
Preceded by Jacques Villeneuve	Lorenzo Bandini Trophy; 1997	Succeeded by Giancarlo Fisichella
