= Clemmer =

Clemmer is a surname. Notable people with the surname include:

- Ann Clemmer (born 1958), American political scientist and politician
- David Clemmer, Canadian style expert
- David E. Clemmer (born 1965), American analytical chemist
- James Clemmer (died 1942), vaudeville and movie theater manager
- Mary C. Ames (born Mary Clemmer, 1831–1884), American author
- Richard L. Clemmer (born c. 1952), American business executive
