= Team (disambiguation) =

A team is a group of people or other animals linked in a common purpose.

Team or variants may also refer to:

== Arts and entertainment ==
=== Music ===
- Team (American band), an indie rock band
- Team (Slovak band), a Slovak pop/rock band
- The Team (group), an American hip hop group
- "Team" (Iggy Azalea song), 2016
- "Team" (Lorde song), 2013

=== Radio ===
- The Team (radio network), Canada, 2001–2002

=== Television ===
- The Team (TV series), a 2015 European crime serial
- "The Team" (Agents of S.H.I.E.L.D.), a Marvel episode
- The Team, a TV series produced by Search for Common Ground

== Organisations ==
- Confederation of Thai Electrical Appliances, Electronic Automobile & Metalworkers, a trade union federation in Thailand
- The Australian Army Training Team Vietnam, a unit of Australian military advisors during the Vietnam War
- The Electors' Action Movement, a municipal political party in Vancouver, British Columbia
- The European Alliance of EU-critical Movements, a Eurosceptic alliance
- The Evangelical Alliance Mission, a Christian missionary organization
- The Emigration Action Movement, a political group that ran in the 1960 Cork Corporation election
- The TEAM, an experimental theater group founded in 2004

== Other uses ==
- Team (horse), a racehorse
- River Team, a tributary of the River Tyne in Gateshead, England
- TEAM Linhas Aéreas, a Brazilian airline
- Transmission Electron Aberration-corrected Microscope Project, the research project at Lawrence Berkeley National Laboratory
- Wasserman (company), also known as The Team, a talent management company
- Atlassian, NASDAQ symbol TEAM

== See also ==
- Teem, a lemon-lime-flavored soft drink
- Teams (disambiguation)
