= Concerns and controversies at the 2020 Summer Olympics =

A number of concerns and controversies arose leading up to the 2020 Summer Olympics, which took place in Tokyo, Japan. The games were postponed until July 2021 as a result of the COVID-19 pandemic. The IOC stated that their Japanese partners and the former prime minister Shinzo Abe "made it very clear" in 2020, "that Japan could not manage a postponement beyond next summer [2021] at the latest". Just weeks before the opening of the Tokyo Olympics, honorary patron Emperor Naruhito was said to be "extremely worried about the current status of coronavirus infections", and was "concerned that while there [were] voices of anxiety among the public, the holding (of the events) may lead to the expansion of infections".

There were allegations of bribery in the Japanese Olympic Committee's (JOC) bid for the games, of plagiarism in the initial design for the games' logo, and of illegal overwork of laborers on the part of dozens of companies involved in construction for the games. Notable safety concerns for athletes included radiation from the Fukushima Daiichi nuclear disaster, water quality, and record heat levels. Political controversies included the use of maps showing disputed territories as part of Japan, and a refusal to ban the Rising Sun Flag at Olympic venues.

== Organisational issues and controversies ==
=== Bribery and corruption ===
In January 2016, the second part of a World Anti-Doping Agency (WADA) commission report into corruption included a footnote detailing a conversation between Khalil Diack, son of former International Association of Athletics Federations (IAAF) President Lamine Diack, and Turkish officials from the Istanbul bid team. A transcript of the conversation cited in the report suggested that a "sponsorship" payment of between US$4 and 5 million had been made by the Japanese bid team "either to the Diamond League or IAAF". The footnote claimed that because Istanbul did not make such a payment, the bid lost the support of Lamine Diack. The WADA declined to investigate the claim because it was, according to its independent commission, outside the agency's remit.

In July and October 2013 (prior to, and after, being awarded the Games), Tokyo made two bank payments totaling 2.8 million Singapore dollars to a Singapore-based company known as Black Tidings. The company is tied to Papa Massata Diack, a son of Lamine Diack, who worked as a marketing consultant for the IAAF, and is being pursued by French authorities under allegations of bribery, corruption, and money laundering. Black Tidings is held by Ian Tan Tong Han, a consultant to Athletics Management and Services—which manages the IAAF's commercial rights and has business relationships with Japanese firm Dentsu. Black Tidings has also been connected to a doping scandal involving the Russian athletics team.

Japanese Olympic Committee (JOC) and Tokyo 2020 board member Tsunekazu Takeda stated that the payments were for consulting services, but refused to discuss the matter further because it was confidential. Toshiaki Endo called on Takeda to publicly discuss the matter. Massata Diack denied that he had received any money from Tokyo's organising committee. The International Olympic Committee (IOC) named a team to investigate these matters, and will closely follow the French investigation.

Reuters reported in 2020 that records from the JOC-commissioned investigation, including interview transcripts, were not provided to French prosecutors. According to Reuters, the JOC said it was not able to share the materials with French investigators.

In January 2019, a source revealed that Takeda was being formally investigated over alleged corruption. On 19 March 2019, Takeda resigned from the JOC.

In November 2019, it was reported that the Tokyo Olympic bid committee's accounting documents, detailing over 900 million yen (≈ 6 million US$) spent on overseas consultancy firms for Tokyo's 2020 Olympics hosting bid, were missing.

In September 2020, the FinCEN Files revealed how payments had been made to the son of an influential IOC member in relation to winning the bid for the Olympic Games.

In 2020, Reuters reported that former Dentsu executive Haruyuki Takahashi had received more than US$8 million from the Tokyo bid committee and said his work included lobbying IOC members, including Lamine Diack. IOC president Thomas Bach later said that the IOC had received confirmation that the payments did not infringe IOC rules.

On 7 June 2021, Moriya Yasushi, the accounting manager of JOC, committed suicide. There was no suicide note and the motive for his suicide is unknown.

Six companies have been indicted on charges of bid-rigging for contracts connected to the Tokyo 2020 Olympics. The parties include Dentsu, Hakuhodo, and four other Japanese companies. The companies have also had a complaint filed against them by Japan's Fair Trade Commission.

==== Olympic sponsorship contract scandals ====
Several Japanese business executives and employees were arrested between August and October 2022 on suspicion of bribery. Former Tokyo 2020 Olympics and Paralympics executive board member Haruyuki Takahashi was arrested on four separate occasions within that period of time after allegedly receiving money from several businesses in exchange for facilitating Olympic sponsorship contracts.

Takahashi, a former senior managing director at Dentsu, was first arrested on 17 August 2022 when prosecutors alleged he received ¥51 million from individuals tied to Japanese men's clothing retailer Aoki in exchange for preferential treatment for sponsorship contracts. Three others, including former Aoki chairman Hironori Aoki and his brother Takahisa Aoki, were arrested and later admitted to charges that they gave ¥28 million to Takahashi.

On 6 September 2022, Takahashi was served a fresh arrest warrant for allegedly accepting ¥76 million (adjusted to ¥69 million under Japan's statute of limitations) through his consulting firm from Japanese publisher Kadokawa Corporation in exchange for Kadokawa being named an official Tokyo Olympics and Paralympics sponsor. Three current and former Kadokawa employees, including chairman Tsuguhiko Kadokawa, were later arrested. Kadokawa announced his intention to step down as his company's chairman following his indictment.

On 26 September 2022, Takahashi was arrested for the third time on allegations that he and an acquaintance received ¥15 million from Osaka-based Daiko Advertising. In return, the organizing committee was asked to use Daiko as an agent for a major English language school operator in Japan which eventually became an official Tokyo Olympics sponsor. A corporate executive for Daiko was also arrested on bribery charges.

Takahashi was arrested for the fourth time on 19 October 2022 for allegedly accepting ¥7 million in bribes from stuffed toy company Sun Arrow–which provided merchandise for the Olympics and Paralympics including stuffed toy renditions of mascots Miraitowa and Someity–and ¥47 million from advertising firm ADK Holdings. Three others, including the president of ADK, were also arrested. The following month, ADK reported to the Japan Fair Trade Commission that they had engaged in bid rigging for the rights to organize Olympic test events.

Takahashi was released on bail on 26 December 2022, more than four months after his initial arrest, after the Tokyo District Court concluded that he did not pose a flight risk and would not destroy evidence.

On 28 February 2023 prosecutors formally indicted Dentsu, rival ad agency Hakuhodo and four other companies on suspicion of rigging bids for Olympic contracts worth approximately ¥43.7 billion, a few days after Dentsu admitted to bid-rigging in voluntary questioning. The companies allegedly colluded with Yasuo Mori, a former operations executive on the organising committee, who was also indicted.

As of February 2023 a total of 22 individuals had been indicted on bribery and bid-rigging charges related to the 2020 Games. In October 2023, the Japanese Olympic Committee officially withdrew Sapporo from consideration to host the 2030 Winter Olympics, citing a lack of support from Japanese citizens in the wake of the corruption issues.

=== Logo plagiarism ===
The original logos of the 2020 Summer Olympics (top left) and Paralympics (top right) and the logo of the Théâtre de Liège (bottom).

The initial designs for the official emblems of the 2020 Summer Olympics and Paralympics were unveiled on 24 July 2015 (five years ahead to the originally scheduled opening ceremony). The logo resembled a stylised "T": a red circle in the top-right corner representing a beating heart, the flag of Japan, and "an inclusive world in which everyone accepts each other"; and a dark grey column in the centre representing diversity. The Paralympic emblem inverted the light and dark columns of the pattern to resemble an equal sign.

Shortly after the unveiling, Belgian graphics designer Olivier Debie accused the organising committee of plagiarising a logo he had designed for the Théâtre de Liège, which, aside from the circle, consisted of nearly identical shapes. Tokyo's organising committee denied that the emblem design was plagiarised, arguing that the design had gone through "long, extensive and international" intellectual property examinations before it was cleared for use. Debie filed a lawsuit against the IOC to prevent use of the infringing logo.

The Tokyo emblem's designer, Kenjirō Sano, defended the design, stating that he had never seen the Liège logo, while the Tokyo Organising Committee of the Olympic and Paralympic Games (TOCOG) released an early sketch of the design that emphasised a stylised "T" and did not resemble the Liège logo. However, Sano was found to have had a history of plagiarism allegations, with others alleging his early design plagiarised work of Jan Tschichold, and that he used a photo without permission in promotional materials for the emblem, along with other past cases. On 1 September 2015, following an emergency meeting of TOCOG, the Governor of Tokyo Yōichi Masuzoe announced that they had decided to scrap Sano's two logos. The committee met the following day to develop a new logo design.

On 24 November 2015, an Emblems Selection Committee was established to organize an open call for design proposals, open to Japanese residents over the age of 18, with a deadline set for 7 December 2015. The winner would receive ¥1 million and tickets to the opening ceremonies of both the 2020 Summer Olympics and Paralympics. On 8 April 2016, a new shortlist of four pairs of designs for Olympic and Paralympic emblems were unveiled by the Emblems Selection Committee; the committee's selection—with input from a public poll—was presented to TOCOG on 25 April 2016 for final approval.

The new emblems for the 2020 Olympics and Paralympics were unveiled on 25 April 2016. Designed by Asao Tokolo, winner of the nationwide design contest, the emblems take the form of a ring in an indigo-colored checkerboard pattern. The design is meant to "express a refined elegance and sophistication that exemplifies Japan".

=== Stadium design plagiarism ===
After Tokyo submitted their bid for the 2020 Summer Olympics, there was talk of possibly renovating or reconstructing the National Olympic Stadium. The stadium would host the opening and closing ceremonies as well as track and field events.

In February 2012, it was confirmed that the stadium would be demolished and reconstructed, and receive a £1 billion upgrade. In November 2012, renderings of the new national stadium were revealed, based on a design by British architect Zaha Hadid. The stadium was demolished in 2015 and the new one was originally scheduled to be completed in March 2019. The new stadium would be the venue for athletics, rugby, some football games, and the opening and closing ceremonies of the Olympics and Paralympics.

In May 2015, due to budget constraints, the Japanese government announced several changes to Hadid's design, including cancelling plans to build a retractable roof, and converting some permanent seating to temporary seating. The area of the site was also reduced from 71 to 52 acres. Several prominent Japanese architects, including Toyo Ito and Fumihiko Maki, criticized Hadid's design, with Ito comparing it to a turtle and Maki calling it a white elephant. Others criticized the stadium's encroachment on the outer gardens of the Meiji Shrine. Arata Isozaki said that he was "shocked to see that the dynamism present in the original had gone" in the redesign of Hadid's original plan.

After the futuristic Olympic stadium design by Zaha Hadid was ditched for cost-related reasons, a new design by the Japanese architect Kengo Kuma faced plagiarism accusations due to its similarities to Hadid's original blueprint. Kuma admitted that there were similarities, but denied copying the work of Hadid.

=== Environmental degradation ===
Contrary to the claim to be an "eco-friendly" Olympic Games, mass logging for the 2020 games became an issue, triggering concerns and protests from citizens and environmental organizations. Domestically, a large number of trees and shrubs in parks were cut down for venue construction and discarded as waste. Some logging was done without notifying the Ainu tribe in Hokkaido, and was reported not to meet the criteria of timber procurement. Instances of logging and procurement for the games, mainly in rainforests in Malaysia and Indonesia, received international criticism. Many believed that the logging infringed on the rights of residents, and 140,000 people signed a petition against deforestation. 47 organizations applied to stop the IOC from procuring timber, claiming that the Tokyo games would become a symbol of environmental destruction and violations of human rights. In Borneo, a local chief petitioned to stop timber procurement in his village.

In addition, one of the companies that provided timber for construction of the new national stadium and Ariake Arena has been suspected of illegal logging for 20 years.

Critics also have reflected on the 2020 Summer Olympics as an attempt at "greenwashing" what was ultimately an environmentally un-friendly event. Citing the attitudes of anti-Olympic protestors, Ganseforth notes "contributions to the Sustainable Development Goals (SDGs) were put in question by the alleged usage of rainforest timber in the construction of the New National Stadium, as well as by food procurement standards that were below the level of the previous Olympics in London and Rio de Janeiro in terms of food safety, sustainable production methods, and animal welfare. For example, standards such as battery cage-free eggs, gestation crate-free pork, or ecolabels in seafood and fresh produce could not be upheld in Tokyo."

== Environment, health and safety concerns ==
=== COVID-19 pandemic and other contagion risks ===
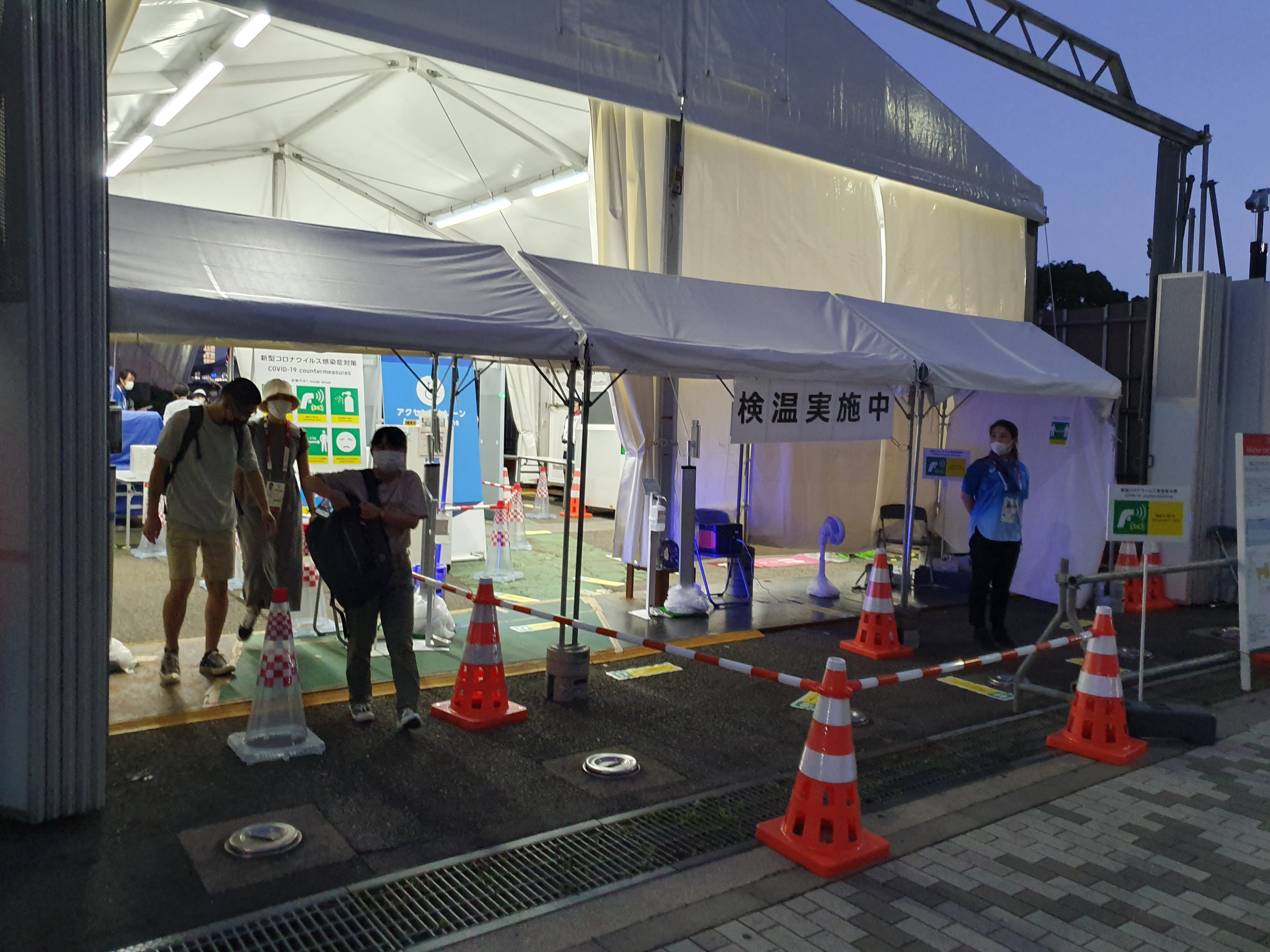
Temperature check and COVID-19 countermeasures at the tennis venue

The COVID-19 (coronavirus disease 2019) pandemic was a concern for the 2020 Summer Olympics, which took place at the end of July 2021. Due to the Olympics, the Japanese government took extra precautions to help control the country's ongoing COVID-19 outbreaks. The Tokyo organizing committee and the International Olympic Committee were closely monitoring COVID-19 cases in Tokyo leading up to the Olympics, in order to determine if the games could be held safely.

Leading up to the Olympics, the Japanese Ministry of Health, Labour and Welfare provided vaccinations for the large portions of the Japanese population still unprotected from common infectious diseases. For example, Japan has no mandatory mumps vaccination and is fourth in the world in mumps cases, after China, Nepal and Burkina Faso, according to data from the World Health Organization (WHO).

Following the outbreaks of rubella in Japan, which prompted the Centers for Disease Control and Prevention (CDC) to warn pregnant women against traveling to Japan in 2018, the country's Ministry of Health, Labour and Welfare conducted inoculations of middle-aged men who did not receive a rubella vaccination in the 1970s and 1980s.

In a February 2020 interview with City A.M., the Conservative London mayoral candidate Shaun Bailey argued that London would be able to host the Olympic Games at the former London 2012 Olympic venues, should the Games need to be moved due to the ongoing disruption caused by the coronavirus outbreak. Tokyo Governor Yuriko Koike criticised Bailey's comment as inappropriate. On 3 March, the organisers said that the Olympics would go on as planned.

On 20 March 2020, the World Anti Doping Agency noted that the coronavirus outbreak was seriously affecting doping tests in advance of the games. The IOC regulations required extensive testing in the months prior to the event. China had temporarily stopped testing in February, and the United States, France, Great Britain, and Germany had reduced testing by March. European anti-doping agencies raised concerns that blood and urine tests could not be performed, and that mobilizing the staff necessary to do so before the end of the pandemic would be a health risk.

On 24 March 2020, due to the rapidly-spreading COVID-19 pandemic across Europe, Africa, and the Americas, the Summer Olympics were postponed to 2021, still to be held in Tokyo.

There was speculation that the Japanese government was suppressing the extent of the infection, to make sure that the 2020 Tokyo Olympic Games would be held on schedule. Former prime minister Yukio Hatoyama suggested that the number of confirmed cases was downplayed by the Japanese government in order to preserve the Olympics as scheduled, adding that Tokyo Governor Yuriko Koike put the 2020 Olympics, rather than Tokyo citizens, first. The country saw a sudden rise in COVID-19 cases after the postponement was announced, but health minister Katsunobu Kato denied the rumour that the postponement of the Olympics was tied to the spike in confirmed cases.

In April, Will Ripley, a correspondent for CNN, said that in the early weeks of the COVID-19 pandemic, the Japanese government was fighting to save the Olympics, as other countries were taking aggressive measures to fight COVID-19. He also mentioned that the confirmed COVID-19 cases suddenly increased after the postponement of the Olympics was announced, pointing out that Japan's approach kept cases low, so that the Japanese government could save the Olympics.

In May 2021, a group of health experts warned that the Tokyo Games, without adopting a practical risk-management approach, could end up with widespread transmission. Pointing out the fact that "adolescents between 15 and 17 years of age cannot be vaccinated in most countries, and children younger than 15 can be vaccinated in even fewer countries", they discussed the possibility that without regular testing, participants, especially teenage athletes, "could become infected during the Olympics and pose a risk when they return home to more than 200 countries".

Under guarantee G5.2 of the Contractual Framework for Hosting Olympic and Paralympic Games, the host country has the legal obligation to take all necessary measures to ensure that their Olympic-related activities should comply with any international agreements with regard to safety and health. However, in July 2020 the Japanese government promoted the "GO TO TRAVEL" campaign, a domestic travel campaign in order to mitigate the devastating impacts of the coronavirus on the Japanese economy. In January 2021, researchers at Kyoto University showed that the tourism campaign contributed to a sharp increase in COVID infection cases in the country. While the Japanese government said that there was no evidence that the campaign was linked to the surge in coronavirus infections, another study which was published in December 2020 showed a higher incidence of COVID-19 symptoms among those who had participated in the travel campaign.

A poll conducted prior to the beginning of the Olympics reported that 83% of Japanese people were in favour of the cancellation of the games. However, Japan's Prime Minister did not allow the public to influence the government's decision of whether or not the games should be held. In July 2021, "Former Prime Minister Abe went on record dismissing the protest against the Olympics as 'anti-Japanese'." Furthermore, as scholar and Olympic critic Ichii suggests, the combination of special measures designed for Olympic preparations and national campaigns to promote a "new lifestyle" to curb the spread of COVID-19 gave the government new powers for reform that created further motivation to continue with the Games. Ichii argues, "The simultaneity of the COVID-19-inspired "new lifestyle" and the Olympic-inspired "state of exception" thus offered an unprecedented opportunity for political, legal, and social reforms at a pace and scale that would have otherwise been impossible".

Despite a rapid increase in COVID-19 detections, Thomas Bach noted that the increase has nothing to do with the Olympics itself. IOC spokesperson Mark Adams said the games would not be cancelled even if public opinion to cancel the games had grown. As reports of increase in COVID-19 cases came into light, Adams stated that "we are not responsible and the increase of positives are happening in a parallel world".

The National Institute of Infectious Diseases reported a detection of the Lambda variant, the first case in Japan, at an airport testing facility on 20 July but did not initially announce it to the public. The Ministry of Health, Labour and Welfare said, in answer The Daily Beast's interview question, that they were waiting to announce it to the public, at the end of the Olympic games. Later, the infected person was revealed to be a staff member of the Olympic games, and Masahisa Sato said, in an interview, that they did not reveal the detection of the Lambda variant until 6 August because there were no enquiries until that day.

To prevent the spread of COVID-19, athletes were restricted from going out. In particular, athletes who tested positive for COVID-19 and were quarantined in hotels complained that it was like a prison. The Tokyo Organizing Committee for the Olympic Games was criticized by some for not disclosing the nationality or gender of athletes for privacy reasons, although it disclosed the number of athletes infected and the date.

=== Fukushima radiation ===
The Tokyo Organising Committee announced that the Olympics torch relay would begin in Fukushima, and the Olympic baseball and softball matches would be played at Fukushima Azuma Baseball Stadium, 55 miles (89 km) from the site of the Fukushima Daiichi nuclear disaster, despite the fact that the scientific studies on the safety of Fukushima were currently in dispute. Regarding the 2011 Tōhoku earthquake and tsunami, a major, level-7 nuclear accident that resulted in multiple nuclear meltdowns, officials from the WHO and the United Nations determined that the risks of dangerous radiation exposure were minimal. Nevertheless, some scientists and citizens remained skeptical.

For example, Tilman Ruff, a public health expert and a co-founder of the Nobel Peace Prize-winning International Campaign to Abolish Nuclear Weapons (ICAN), urged the Australian Olympic Committee to properly inform its staff and athletes attending the 2020 Tokyo Games about the ongoing health effects of the Fukushima radiation.

Former nuclear industry executive and whistle blower Arnold Gundersen and his institute, Fairewinds Associates, tested for the presence of radioactive dust on land scheduled to be used for certain events, including baseball, softball, and the Olympic torch relay. At these facilities, the legally allowable radiation levels were higher than at other athletic facilities. According to certain models, such as the National Academy of Sciences' "linear, no-threshold" model, small increases in radiation exposure may cause proportional health risks. The Japanese government posted that measured radiation levels in the city of Fukushima were comparable with safe readings in Hong Kong and Seoul, while Tokyo's readings are even lower, in line with Paris and London. However, the data collected by the monitoring posts installed by the Japanese governments were partial and non-representative of the extent of radioactive contamination, as they measured only the atmospheric radiation levels in the form of gamma rays, but not radionuclides, such as cesium-137, which emit alpha and beta particles that are dangerous when inhaled or ingested. It was also pointed out that the government-installed monitoring posts were placed strategically and the areas surrounding the posts were cleaned so that the radiation levels remained lower. Greenpeace reported that the radiation levels measured around the J-Village sports camp in Fukushima, where the Tokyo 2020 Olympic torch relay would begin, were 1,700 times higher than before the Fukushima Daiichi nuclear disaster. Even though the Japanese government promised radiation levels below 0.23 μSv per hour, radiation hot spots at the J-Village showed readings as high as 1.7 μSv per hour at 1 metre (3 ft 3 in) above the surface and over 71 μSv per hour at surface level.

In October 2019, after tons of poorly-secured radioactive Fukushima waste were swept away by typhoon Hagibis, IOC chief Thomas Bach promised to carry out inspections on radiation safety.

In November 2019, a Japanese citizens' group Minna-No Data Site (Everyone's Data Site) published an English version of the Citizens' Radiation Data Map of Japan, a 16-page booklet featuring radiation-level maps, created using soil samples from 3,400 sites in 17 prefectures in eastern Japan, the results of three-year land contamination surveys with approximately 4,000 volunteers.

Additionally, as of 2019, food from the region, under import restrictions in 23 countries, has been tested intensively for safety. During the Olympics, the South Korean team provided its own food service for the team, claiming that the food served in the Olympic village might be contaminated with radiation. South Korea's Kukmin Ilbo also claimed that the bouquet presented to medalists may also have been contaminated with radiation. In response to these South Korean claims, the governor of Fukushima Prefecture, Masao Uchibori, claimed that "Currently, Japan's standards for radioactive materials are the strictest in the world, and all foods and plants have passed the inspection. People should correct misunderstandings and prejudices based on correct information." A Japanese government official said, "Their claims have no scientific basis and they are insulting people in the Fukushima area. The Japanese government should urge the IOC to warn South Korea."

=== Hot weather and air-conditioning ===
Tokyo's bid to host the Summer Olympics played down concerns over heat, with the proposal reading "With many days of mild and sunny weather, this period provides an ideal climate for athletes to perform at their best". However, the 2020 Olympics were expected to be the hottest Olympics ever, due to Tokyo's hot summer climate (the 1964 Summer Olympics were held in October to avoid the heat), the urban heat island effect and climate change.

In October 2019, the International Olympic Committee announced plans for moving the Olympic marathon and race walking to Sapporo, more than 800 kilometres (500 mi) north of Tokyo, in a bid to avoid the heat. The Tokyo Metropolitan Government strongly opposed the IOC's decision, suggesting, instead, to move the marathon start time up one hour to 5:00 a.m., while Sapporo welcomed the IOC announcement. In October 2019, Japanese politician Shigefumi Matsuzawa wrote to IOC chief Thomas Bach to move the Olympic golf tournaments, scheduled to take place at Kasumigaseki Golf Club in Saitama Prefecture, about 50 kilometres (31 mi) northwest of Tokyo, to a region with fewer heat problems.

Concern over indoor temperatures was also raised, since, for cost reduction, Tokyo's New National Stadium was built without an air conditioner, and the roof was constructed over the spectator seating only. In December 2019, the Asahi Shimbun reported that, due to the dangers of hyperthermia, 206 primary schools in 24 out of 50 wards in Tokyo Prefecture had given up their tickets to the Olympic and Paralympic games, among those tickets allotted by the government to schoolchildren. Also, 101 additional schools told Asahi that they were considering giving up their tickets. According to the report, more than 70% of the private primary schools in Tokyo were planning to refrain from taking students to the Olympic and Paralympic games.

On 23 July 2021, Russian archer Svetlana Gomboeva collapsed due to heat after the qualifying Olympic round. She recovered after being promptly assisted by the medical staff and by the American, British and Italian teams' doctors.

Daniil Medvedev and Novak Djokovic suggested that organisers should delay the start times of tennis matches until the evening to avoid the hottest parts of the day, when temperatures hovered around 33 degrees Celsius. On 28 July 2021, Medvedev asked the umpire who would be responsible if he died during his Olympic tennis match. Paula Badosa, who got through to the quarter-final, was forced to withdraw from the competition because she developed heatstroke in the extremely hot weather.

=== Water quality and temperatures ===
The sea off the Odaiba Marine Park in Tokyo Bay, the venue for the Olympic and Paralympic triathlons, was reported to contain high levels of faecally-derived coliform bacteria.

On 17 August 2019, the Paratriathlon World Cup, scheduled at the venue, was cancelled due to a high concentration of E. coli bacteria in the water. In the same year, some triathletes who competed in the world triathlon mixed-relay event at the park complained about the water's foul odor, saying that it "smelt like a lavatory". Scientists also urged the Olympic organisers to abandon the venue. In the same month, Ous Mellouli, Yumi Kida, and other athletes, who participated an Olympic open water test event in Odaiba Marine Park, expressed their concerns over water temperature, odor, and clarity. Water temperature during the event was at 30.9 °C (87.6 °F), barely inside of acceptable range for official competition by FINA: 16–31 °C (61–88 °F).

In December 2019, the USA Olympic Open Water Team head coach Catherine Kase and the American Swimming Coaches Association (ASCA) asked the open water venue to be moved out of Tokyo to safer waters. Saying that they "are not comfortable with the Odaiba venue", the US swimmers and coaches called for a viable back-up plan for the open-water venue, in case swimming in Tokyo Bay was not safe due to environmental factors, such as near-danger levels of water temperatures (averaging 29–30 °C (84–86 °F) in summer 2019) and water quality issues, including E. coli bacteria and water transparency problems.

In February 2020, swimmer Haley Anderson voiced her concerns for the compromised water quality from E. coli, unsafe water temperature (84–86 °F (29–30 °C)), and lack of a plan-B venue for the Tokyo Olympics, saying that the swimmers "have spoken out and gone unheard so far". She also added that she was "not confident in FINA or the IOC to have the same concern for the athletes".

=== Asbestos in Olympic venues ===
Asbestos, a well-known health hazard that is prohibited from being used as a building material in many countries, including Japan, was found at the Tokyo Tatsumi International Swimming Center, where the Olympic water polo events would take place. In 2017, when the asbestos was first found, in fireproof material sprayed on part of the structure supporting the swimming centre's roof, the Tokyo Metropolitan Government decided to leave it, deeming that the small amount of the mineral present would not be accessible to visitors. In 2019, after media coverage, the organisers promised to take "emergency countermeasures" to solve the problem, without specifying what actions would be taken.

=== Tropical Storm Nepartak ===
Due to the weather effects from Tropical Storm Nepartak, certain sports' schedules were disrupted. The start of the women's triathlon was delayed, while surfing events were moved a day ahead to take advantage of the waves. The schedule of archery events was also affected. The rowing competitions were rescheduled as well. In addition, staff members were seen removing umbrellas in preparation for the approaching storm to avoid their being blown away.

== Damage caused by athletes and other issues ==
=== Damage of rooms by Australian athletes ===
Near the end of the Olympics, it was reported that Australian athletes had damaged the village rooms before departure, leaving a pool of vomit on the floor, damaged beds, and a hole in the wall. Australian rugby Olympians also reportedly became drunk on the flight to Sydney, leaving vomit in the plane bathroom and receiving complaints from other passengers. Team Australia chief Ian Chesterman played down the incidents, and said that the Olympians would not be punished.

=== Other incidents ===
On August 27, there was an accident in which judoka Aramitsu Kitazono, was hit by Toyota's self-driving car "e-Palette". According to the Tokyo Metropolitan Police Department, Kitazono was injured, hitting his head and both legs, and would need two weeks to recover. Kitazono missed his match on the 28th.

== Political and human rights issues ==
=== Worker rights ===
In 2017, the suicide of a Tokyo Olympic stadium worker was linked to overwork, according to Japanese labor inspectors. The 23-year-old man in charge of quality control of materials at the stadium construction site was found to have recorded 211 hours and 56 minutes of overtime in one month before he killed himself in March. In September, inspectors found illegal overwork in almost 40 companies, 18 of which had employees working overtime of more than 80 hours per month, and several of them exceeding 150 hours. According to the Building and Wood Workers' International (BWI) report on worker safety, "dangerous patterns of overwork", including cases of working up to 28 consecutive days, were found at Tokyo Olympic construction sites. Construction workers, many of whom were foreign migrant workers, were reported to have been discouraged from reporting poor working conditions, and some workers were required to purchase their protective equipment.

In December 2017, Mitsubishi Electric, an official partner of the 2020 Olympic games, locked 1,800 workers out of a Thailand factory. The workers were members of a trade union affiliated with the Confederation of Thai Electrical Appliances, Electronic Automobile & Metalworkers. The company then forced workers to attend eleven days of humiliating training at a military camp and cleaning old people's homes, among other chores, and forced them to publicly apologise to the company on social media. Most of the workers were reinstated in January 2018. IndustriALL Global Union condemned the harassment and filed a complaint with the Tokyo Organising Committee.

=== Acknowledgement of disputed territories ===
Russian and South Korean officials took issue with a map of the torch relay on the Games' official website, which depicted the disputed Liancourt Rocks (territory claimed by Japan but governed by South Korea) and the Kuril Islands (territory claimed by Japan but governed by Russia since 1945) as part of Japan. Maria Zakharova, spokeswoman of the Russian Ministry of Foreign Affairs, described the inclusion as "illegal", and accused the Tokyo Organising Committee of "politicising" the Games.

Chinese diplomats took issue with the Taiwanese team being introduced as "Taiwan" instead of Chinese Taipei.

=== Rising Sun Flag ===
Rising Sun Flag

The South Korean government called for a ban of the usage the Rising Sun Flag, due to the flag being considered offensive, as a consequence of its usage by the Imperial Japanese military during World War II, as well as its current use by controversial nationalist groups in Japan, such as Zaitokukai. The flag, which has been compared by many to the Nazi swastika, the US Confederate flag in modern times, and the Apartheid flag of South Africa, is associated with war crimes and atrocities committed under the Empire of Japan, as well as contemporary Japan's far-right nationalist attempts to revise, deny, or romanticise its imperialistic past.

The flag is currently banned by FIFA, and Japan was sanctioned by the Asian Football Confederation (AFC) after Japanese fans flew it at an AFC Champions League match in 2017.

In September 2019, the South Korean parliamentary committee for sports asked the organisers of 2020 Summer Olympics in Tokyo to ban the Rising Sun Flag, and the Chinese Civil Association for Claiming Compensation from Japan sent a letter to the International Olympic Committee asking it to ban the flag.

According to the Associated Press, the IOC issued a statement in response to South Korea's request, saying, "sports stadiums should be free of any political demonstration. When concerns arise at games time we look at them on a case by case basis."

On 8 August, the final day of the Tokyo Olympics, the South Korean Olympic Committee announced, "The IOC has declared in a letter that the Rising Sun Flag violates the Olympic Charter. It will be banned at the Olympics." South Korea said that the event proceeded without any diplomatic incidents between South Korea and Japan, and that the country was successful in having the IOC ban Japan's Rising Sun flag from the event. In response, the Tokyo Organising Committee of the Olympic Games announced on 9 August, "The announcement by the South Korean Olympic Committee is not true. When we contacted the IOC, we confirmed that the IOC will continue to respond to the issue on a case-by-case basis and will not impose a blanket ban. On the morning of 9 August, the IOC had sent a letter to South Korea indicating that the use of the flag will be determined on a case-by-case basis."

=== South Korean team banner ===
The South Korean team hung a banner off of the balcony in their section of the Olympic village that had the message "I still have the support of 50 million Korean people". This was adapted from the words of the Korean naval admiral Yi Sun-sin who said "I still have 12 battleships left." prior to pulling off a crucial victory against the 16th century Japanese invasion of the Korean Peninsula. After a Japanese protest and the IOC warning that it was provocative and a violation of the Olympic Charter, the South Korean team removed the banner. According to the South Korean Olympic Committee, the IOC would apply the same rules if the Rising Sun Flag is raised.

=== Prohibition of political gestures ===
The IOC published three pages of guidelines prohibiting athletes from using political gestures, such as kneeling, hand gestures, and disrespect during medal ceremonies. They were allowed to express political views on traditional and social media, and in interviews outside the Olympic Village. The decision came under fire, with critics pointing out that the IOC itself is not politically neutral, citing Adolf Hitler's actions during the 1936 Summer Olympics and the IOC's efforts to be granted UN Observer status during the Cold War, among other instances. Retired tennis player Martina Navratilova tweeted, "God how I despise these Olympic politician opportunists. I wouldn't last one day on one of these committees..."

In early May 2021, the IOC announced that they would ban athletes who wear apparel sporting the Black Lives Matter slogan at the Tokyo Olympics.

=== Mobilisation of students for the Olympics ===
Criticism that students were being compelled to attend the Olympic Games was directed at the policy that students in Japanese schools whose principals had decided to accept the allocated Olympic and Paralympic tickets for school students were expected to be treated as absent from school if they did not attend the games. In the end, most spectators were disallowed from events due to the COVID-19 state of emergency.

=== Cyber-reconnaissance ===
British officials claimed that the Russian GRU military intelligence agency conducted "cyber-reconnaissance" operations against organizers, logistics suppliers, and sponsors. The GRU's operations were condemned by the United Kingdom and the US. The Tokyo Organising Committee said in a statement that there was "no significant impact observed".

=== Comments about Islam ===
Naoki Inose, who was the chairman of Tokyo's successful bid for the 2020 games, triggered controversy for his comments on Islam, Istanbul, and their bid in 2013, as he described the Muslim world to be "always fighting" and "Well, compare the two countries where they have yet to build infrastructure, very sophisticated facilities. So from time to time, like Brazil, I think it's good to have a venue for the first time. But Islamic countries, the only thing they share in common is Allah and they are fighting with each other and they have classes".

As criticizing rival bids is prohibited under IOC rules, Inose's statement was viewed as a violation, and received international criticism. Inose later apologized for his comments, saying that he was "fully committed" to respecting IOC rules.

=== Remarks by key figures ===
Yoshiro Mori, originally the president of the Tokyo Olympics Committee, received domestic and international criticisms due to several of his actions viewed as sexist remarks, leading to his resignation. Mori has been known for multiple controversies over his remarks on various topics throughout his career, and such remarks were pointed out as violating the Olympic Charter, which respects human rights regardless of social status. Despite Mori's reassignment, Seiko Hashimoto, who succeeded Mori as president of the committee, triggered controversy over the same topic due to her previous conduct. Mori also noted that he wanted a "pure Japanese male" to be the final runner of the torch relay instead of Naomi Osaka. In July 2021, a plan to appoint Mori as the "Honorary Chief Advisor" of the committee to praise his achievements for the bids, sparked yet another argument.

=== Swim caps and women's uniforms ===
Swim caps specially designed for the thick, curly, and naturally voluminous hair of people of Black ancestry were disallowed by FINA, leading to accusations of racial discrimination.

Germany's women gymnastics team decided to wear full-body suits (unitards) instead of leotards, to take a stand against sexualization of the sport.

== Opening and closing ceremonies ==
=== Scandals of the directors of the ceremonies ===
==== Hiroshi Sasaki: "Olympig" ====
On 5 March 2020, Hiroshi Sasaki, the creative director of the ceremonies, proposed the following direction in the LINE message referring to plus-sized Japanese comedian and actress Naomi Watanabe, who was speculated to have a role in the opening ceremony: "The part where she transforms into a pig. How to make her look cute. Olympig". He submitted his resignation on 18 March 2021 after receiving criticism for proposing the plan to make Naomi Watanabe look like a pig.

==== Kentaro Kobayashi: Past Holocaust jokes ====
On 21 July 2021, Japanese media reported that Kentarō Kobayashi, who became the director of the opening and closing ceremonies after Sasaki resigned, utilized The Holocaust in a script for his comedy in 1998, and that he made malicious and anti-Semitic jokes, and jokes about the Holocaust, including "Let's play Jews genocide game (Let's play Holocaust)." The Simon Wiesenthal Center (SWC), a Jewish human rights organization, immediately issued a statement of condemnation to the anti-Semitic jokes. On 22 July, the day before the opening ceremony, the organizing committee announced its decision to dismiss Kobayashi.

On the eve of the opening ceremony, Prime Minister Yoshihide Suga, the supreme advisor of the organizing committee, described Kobayashi's jokes as "outrageous and unacceptable", but also said that the opening ceremony planned by Kobayashi should proceed.

In response to this situation, comedian Naoto Takenaka said he would not attend the opening ceremony, citing his past joke about disabled people. Hearing this, many other comedians, such as Masami Hisamoto, were said to have been scared of "being exposed" by their past jokes or remarks. Domestically, some of the public viewed these exposures negatively, as leading to self-censoring, or kotobagari.

=== Appointment and resignation of Keigo Oyamada ===
On 14 July 2021, the organizing committee announced the creative team for the opening and closing ceremonies of the Olympics and Paralympics, and appointed Keigo Oyamada, or Cornelius, as a composer of the opening ceremony. It caused a growing number of people on social media to state that he should be ineligible to occupy such a role because he is widely known for his involvement in past bullying of people with apparent disabilities, such as Down syndrome. He was involved in abuse on his peers when at school, such as forcing them to eat their excrement, masturbate in front of other students, etc. He himself often unapologetically told the disability abuse stories in interviews. On 16 July, a week before the opening ceremony, the organizing committee of the Olympic and Paralympic Games, whose insight and good sense was questioned, reiterated their support for him as a composer and that they would not change their decision for the ceremonies. Toshirō Mutō, the chief executive of the organizing committee, said he wanted Oyamada to remain involved. However, growing criticism forced Oyamada to announce his resignation on 19 July.

=== Absence of foreign leaders ===
Due to various reasons, such as the global reach of coronavirus variants, many leaders outside Japan announced that they would not attend the ceremonies of this event. Only leaders from around 15 countries and international organizations stated their intention to visit Japan for the opening ceremony, although roughly 40 had attended the same event for the Rio de Janeiro Games in 2016.

Emmanuel Macron, the President of France, was the only G7 leader outside Japan who announced their intention to attend the opening ceremony, as France was hosting the next Olympics. Jill Biden, the First Lady of the United States, also announced her intention to attend the ceremony, on behalf of her husband, President Joe Biden, as the United States will host the 2028 Summer Olympics.

Moon Jae-in, the president of South Korea, was originally thinking of visiting Japan to attend the opening ceremony, but canceled his plans after a senior diplomat of the Embassy of Japan, Seoul, said the leader was "masturbating" if he thought he would have a summit with Suga, the prime minister of Japan.

=== Criticism from Latyr Sy ===
In July 2021, Latyr Sy, a Senegalese musician, posted on his Facebook about the cancellation of his already scheduled performance. Sy wrote that he was questioned by the Tokyo Organising Committee, "Why [an] African is here to perform?" Additionally, Sy said about the organising committee, "It's totally racist".

The Japan Olympic Committee is a bunch of racists Just before the Olympic they canceled my performance at the opening ceremony because I am African (JOC judged I was inappropriate). They simply questioned "why African is here to perform??" though I've been contributing to the Japanese music industry since 1995... They completely violate the Olympic principles of human rights and diversity. So ashamed its so disgusting i feel insulted and have to let it out bcoz it hurts now. Why now just watching the news many saying this shouldn't happen but for me born in island of dark history getting through this is a scandale we are in 21 century how come this happen ?? Hope they got the answer ? Remember 400 years of suffering may peace prevail on Mother Earth salam have a great journey.

— Latyr Sy's Facebook

On 23 July, the day of the opening ceremony, some media reported his claim. At a regular press conference held the next morning, Masanori Takaya, a spokesperson of the organising committee, said Sy's claim differed from the facts, and said "We had planned a music part in which many singers would participate, but due to infectious disease control and budget, we canceled the part itself. Therefore we canceled the appearance of all the participants in the music part. That is the background of that story."

=== Music composed by Koichi Sugiyama ===
At the opening ceremony, the theme music from Dragon Quest was used as a part of the Parade of Nations. The Daily Beast, an American news website, posted an article criticizing this, because the composer of the music, Koichi Sugiyama, was also known for his denial of Japan's use of comfort women, his opposition to LGBTQ rights, and his extreme nationalism. There had also been concern about the image that would be presented in the Japanese press before the Games.

=== Yasushi Akimoto, a member of the Olympics organising committee: Girl groups, misogyny ===
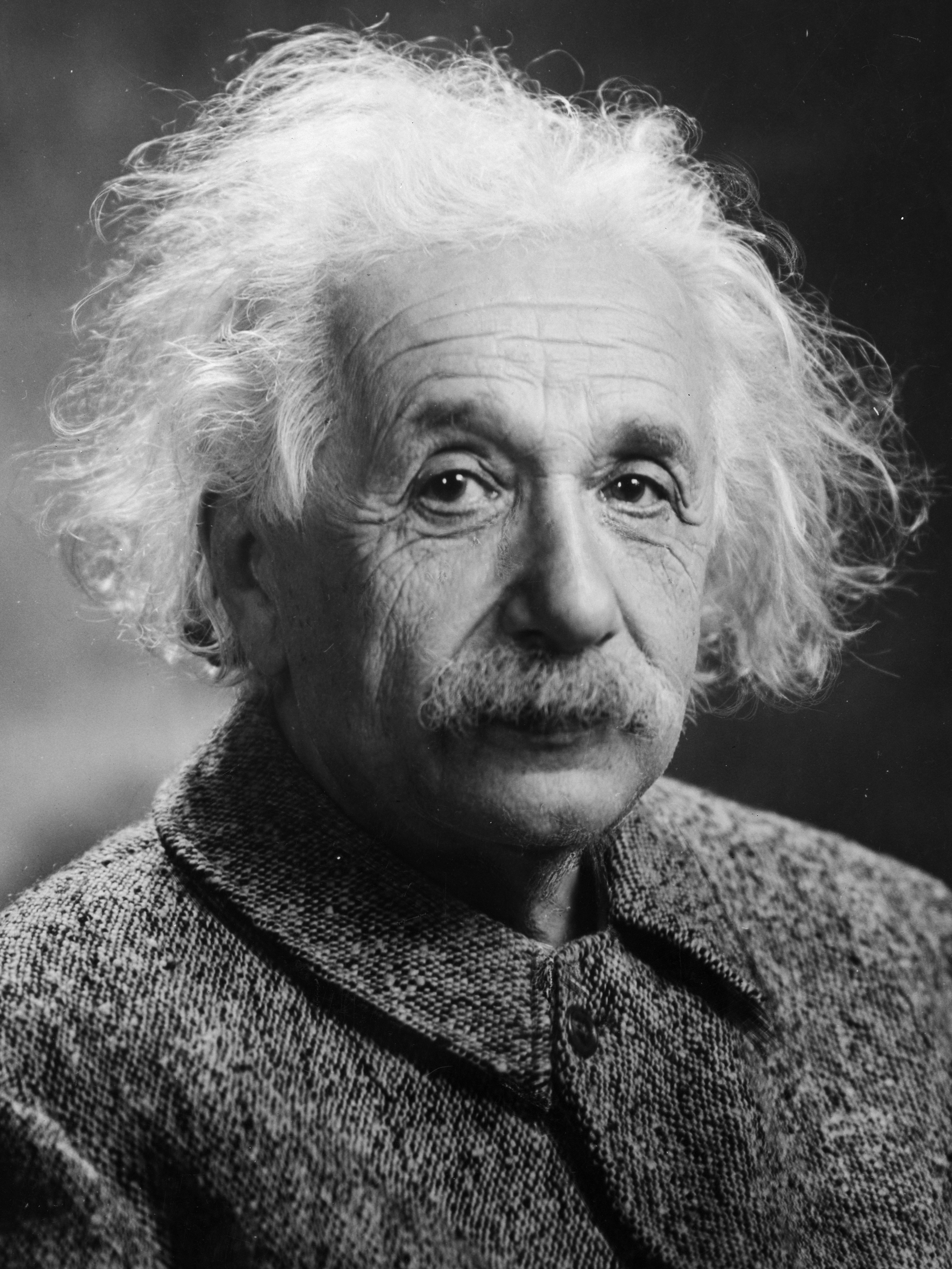
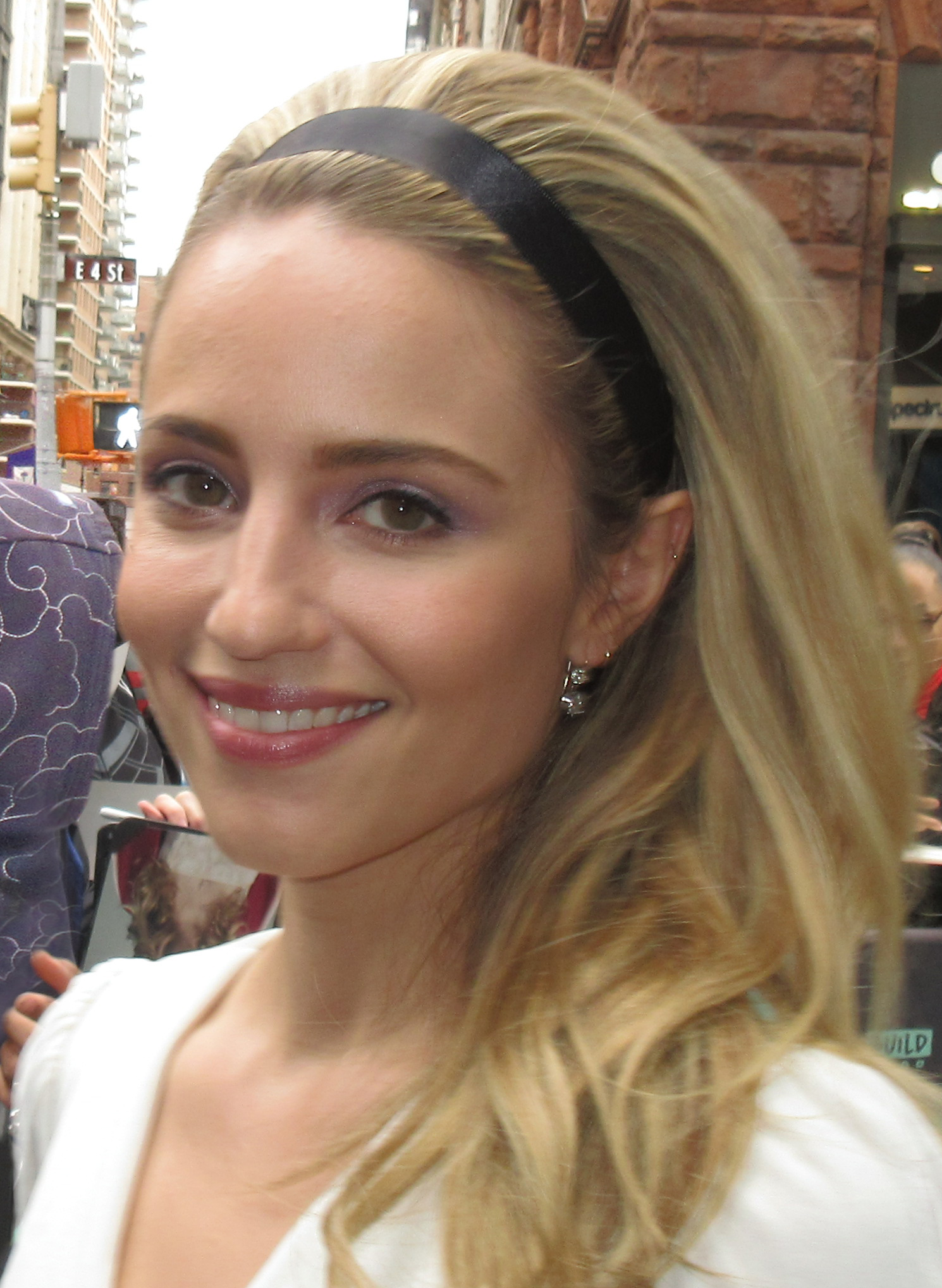
Albert Einstein and Dianna Agron mentioned in the lyrics of "Einstein yori Dianna Agron".

In 2016, the Japanese girl group HKT48 released the single "74 Okubun no 1 no Kimi e", with a B-side called "Einstein yori Dianna Agron", written by Yasushi Akimoto. Comparing scientist Albert Einstein's intelligence and actress Dianna Agron's charm, the song was widely criticized as misogynistic in tone and message and as insulting to Agron. Some commentators, including The Japan Times, were critical of the fact that Akimoto, who at the time was on the Games' organising committee, would be allowed to represent the nation to the world.

The choice of Akimoto as producer had been controversial when he was announced in 2014, as he suggested using his girl group AKB48 as the musical act in the ceremony, with various Japanese media personalities saying that to do so would be a shameful representation. A petition was started to remove him from the organising committee due to him contributing to the "decline" of the Japanese entertainment industry. According to several Japanese media outlets, Akimoto strongly denied rumors that he was planning the opening ceremony specifically, also saying that he had never proposed that AKB48 perform in it.

=== Protests during the opening ceremony ===
During the opening ceremony, protests opposing the Olympics were held in the southwestern corner of the Japan National Stadium, timed so that it would coincide with the beginning of the ceremony. The protest reportedly was loud enough at times to be heard from inside the stadium during the ceremony's quieter moments. During the protest, a man who was a member of the far-left revolutionary group Revolutionary Communist League, National Committee, was arrested on charges of obstructing police officers from carrying out their duties.

=== Tencent Video's broadcast of the opening ceremony ===
Due to political tensions between China and Taiwan, the Chinese video streaming platform Tencent Video abruptly stopped the live stream of the opening ceremony when the Olympic contingent from Taiwan walked into the stadium, and replaced it with a short stand-up comedy clip. However, when Tencent Video resumed the broadcast, it missed the live entry of the Olympic contingent from China, resulting in viewers demanding an apology from Tencent and threatening to uninstall the streaming platform. Tencent Video later issued an apology, alleging copyright issues for the broadcast interruption.

=== South Korean broadcast of the opening ceremony ===
During the live broadcast of the opening ceremony, South Korean broadcaster MBC showed profiles of countries, using insensitive or stereotypical facts and images, during the parade of nations, such as Italy being represented by a picture of pizza, Romania represented by a picture of Dracula, Ukraine represented by a photo of the Chernobyl disaster, El Salvador represented by a photo of a bitcoin exchange, Norway represented by a photo of a salmon, Mongolia represented by a photo of Genghis Khan, Syria's profile mentioning the ongoing civil war as having "underground resources; a civil war that has been going on for 10 years", Haiti described as having an "unstable political situation due to the assassination of the president", the Marshall Islands as a "once a nuclear test site for the United States", and Cayman Islands as being "infamous for tax evasion". After the profiles went viral in foreign media, they were heavily criticized as insensitive and inappropriate. MBC issued an apology at the end of the broadcast of the opening ceremony, and later posted an apology on their official website.

== During the games ==
=== Belarusian athlete expulsion attempt ===
On 30 July 2021, Belarusian sprinter Krystsina Tsimanouskaya criticized the national sports authorities and team management for forcing her to run the 4 × 400m relay without her consent. On 1 August 2021, Tsimanouskaya was expelled from further competitions by the Belarusian sports authorities, reportedly as a consequence of her criticism. On the same day, Belarusian sports officials tried to put her on a plane against her will. She sought the protection of police in Tokyo Haneda Airport and declared that she is not planning to return to Belarus. According to the Belarusian team officials, she was expelled for her "emotional and psychological state" after medical examination, but Tsimanouskaya refuted that statement. She asked the International Olympic Committee for help. As a result of this incident, two Belarusian coaches were ejected from the Games.

=== Animal abuse in the modern pentathlon ===
In the women's modern pentathlon, German team coach Kim Raisner hit a horse that did not follow the instructions of jockey Annika Schleu. Her actions drew criticism, and the International Modern Pentathlon Union promptly disqualified her from the rest of the Tokyo Olympics.

=== Swimming timing system ===
Four swimming heats recorded tied results, raising questions about the pool sensor timing systems in place. FINA officials said there was "nothing wrong" with the timing system. Yuliya Yefimova commented in an interview that she felt environments and schedules were unfair.

=== Boycott in competing against Israeli athletes ===
In Judo, Algerian judoka Fethi Nourine pulled out of the competition, after learning that he could potentially face Israeli Tohar Butbul in the next round. Butbul's next opponent, Sudan's Mohamed Abdalarasool, also pulled out.

=== Iranian terrorist accusations ===
There were calls to suspend Iran's Javad Foroughi, who won gold in the men's 10 metre air pistol, after it emerged that he had served with the Quds Force in Syria. Foroughi is a nurse in the Islamic Revolutionary Guard Corps (IRGC) and served in Syria in 2012–13, as part of a medical deployment. The IRGC is designated a terrorist organisation by several countries, including the United States, Canada, Israel, and Saudi Arabia. United for Navid, a campaign group set up after the execution of Navid Afkari, demanded that the IOC's Ethics Commission launch an investigation and suspend Foroughi, whilst Korean shooter Jin Jong-oh said, "How can a terrorist win first place? That's the most absurd and ridiculous thing." Jin Jong-oh later apologized for his critical remarks and said, "I was not careful enough to check out the facts over some reports (on Foroughi), and I should also have been more considerate."

=== Hong Kong shirt incidents ===
Ng Ka Long, representing Hong Kong in men's singles in badminton, received criticism from Nicholas Muk (of the Democratic Alliance for the Betterment and Progress of Hong Kong) and other pro-Beijing politicians and netizens for wearing a black shirt during a match against Mexico's Lino Muñoz. While his shirt displayed his name and "Hong Kong, China" on the back according to regulations, it was claimed that the colour of his shirt was related to the dominant colour of the 2019–2020 Hong Kong protests. Additionally, the missing Bauhinia emblem on his shirt also became a subject of criticism, despite Hong Kong government regulations requiring that any emblems were to be approved by the chief executive. Ng responded, on Instagram, that his shirt sponsorship arrangement with Yonex, also worn by his badminton teammates, had expired just prior to the games, and he had to seek out an alternative on short notice. His shirt did not violate IOC guidelines, according to the Hong Kong Olympic Committee.

Also criticized was as an error on Ng's replacement shirt, bearing an incorrect bauhinia flower on the regional flag. That version of the regional flag emblem was passed by the National People's Congress in 1990, and was not the modified version specified by the Regional Flag and Regional Emblem Ordinance of 1997. According to the Ming Pao newspaper, this error was rectified by the Hong Kong Badminton Association and stated that the sponsor (Yonex) would issue new, revised jerseys to the remaining players, Tang Chun Man and Tse Ying Suet, competing in the mixed doubles bronze medal match.

=== Venezuelan medalist phone calls ===
After winning their medals, each of Venezuela's four medalists were obliged to speak on the phone with president Nicolás Maduro. According to Venezuelan media, the statements in the calls were guided by Venezuelan officials who were supervising each of the medalists. Political scientists have noted that the Venezuelan government used Olympic success as a form of propaganda.

Venezuela's first medal of the Games was won by weightlifter Julio Mayora on 28 July, a silver medal that he dedicated (in his phone call) to late president Hugo Chávez, who had been born on 28 July. Noticiero Digital reported that, in the video, Venezuelan Youth and Sport Minister Mervin Maldonado can be heard in the background instructing him to do so. Mayora was attacked on social media in Venezuela for the dedication, as politics in that nation are controversial. The next day, Maduro took to national television to defend Mayora as a patriot and say that the nation's sporting "generation of gold" started with Chávez. El Pitazo interviewed Venezuelan Olympic cyclist Daniel Dhers about the controversy, with Dhers saying that, regardless of politics, everyone is at the Games for Venezuela. There also was criticism of the other medalists, including gold medalist Yulimar Rojas: El Nacional negatively compared them to the "dignified" Krystsina Tsimanouskaya, and, in particular, to the Cuban defector Orestes Lorenzo.

=== Online abuse of athletes ===
Chinese shooter Wang Luyao, who failed to qualify for the finals of women's air-rifle competition, was heavily abused online as several users called her out for losing, after she apologised for her loss on Chinese social media platform Sina Weibo by posting a selfie captioned "Sorry everyone, I admit I chickened out. See you in three years." The backlash to Wang's post became a top trend on the platform, forcing her to delete her post. As a result of the online abuse, Weibo announced that accounts of 33 users were banned temporarily and 35 hate comments were deleted. In response to the trolls, a counter-trend of hashtag "Wang Luyao is still Zhejiang's good girl" later emerged on Chinese social media, as people rallied support for her, and state media China Daily published an editorial piece in support of Wang and shaming her bullies.

Singaporean swimmer Joseph Schooling, the defending champion from the butterfly event five years earlier in Rio de Janeiro, failed to qualify for the semi-finals of the 100m swimming event, received numerous negative and hurtful comments from Singaporean fans following his loss. In response, Singaporean president Halimah Yacob came to Schooling's defense and urged Singaporeans to support their national athletes. Other public figures expressed their support of Schooling and called on Singaporeans to support him, with Minister for Culture, Community and Youth Edwin Tong describing Schooling as a "true sporting legend".

The decision by American gymnast Simone Biles to withdraw from the competition was met with criticism from right-wing commentators and Internet trolls. Prominent commentators included Piers Morgan and Charlie Kirk, who accused her of bringing shame and being unheroic, with Morgan saying to the Daily Mail that "I don't think it's remotely courageous, heroic or inspiring to quit." She was also slandered in the Russian state-owned media, with racist, sexist, and transphobic undertones, as well as openly accusing her of being a drug cheat. Their criticism was met with backlash from supporters of Biles and a wider American society, as well as prominent TV pundits, on CNN and elsewhere.

South Korean athlete An San, who won triple gold, was criticized and abused by South Korean anti-feminists online who called her a "short-haired feminist" and asked officials to take back her gold medal. The online hate and abuse was due to the rising antifeminist sentiments among South Korean youth.

Some Japanese athletes who beat Chinese athletes were abused online by Chinese nationalists on Instagram, Twitter, and Weibo. Some Chinese nationalists questioned the scoring of Japan's Daiki Hashimoto, who won the gold medal in the men's artistic individual all-around of gymnastics, as he received a higher score than China's Xiao Ruoteng on the vault, despite stepping off the mat on the landing. They tagged Hashimoto's Instagram account with pictures of the atomic bombings of Hiroshima and Nagasaki. In response, the International Gymnastics Federation (FIG) announced details of Hashimoto's scoring and made it clear that it was correct. Some Chinese nationalists also sent many messages, wishing for their deaths, to the SNS accounts of Jun Mizutani and Mima Ito, who won gold medals in mixed doubles table tennis. In response, Katsunobu Katō, the Chief Cabinet Secretary of the Japanese government, said, "The bullying goes against the spirit of the Tokyo Olympics."

Chinese table tennis players Liu Shiwen and Xu Xin, who lost to Mima Ito and Jun Mizutani, were attacked online by Chinese nationalists saying they had "failed the nation", while making unsubstantiated claims of referee bias in favor of Ito and Mizutani. Chinese badminton players Li Junhui and Liu Yuchen were also targeted by nationalist trolls when they lost their badminton doubles final to Lee Yang and Wang Chi-lin of Taiwan.

Matea Jelić, the Croatian taekwondo athlete who won gold in the women's 67 kg competition, was sent abuse and death threats on Instagram by Serbian nationalists, after stating that she would like to merge the celebration of her triumph in her hometown of Knin with the celebration of the 26th anniversary of Operation Storm, the last major battle of the Croatian War of Independence that lasted from 4 to 7 August 1995, which ended the existence of the proto-state Republic of Serbian Krajina (RSK), of which Knin was the capital. Upon arriving at her hometown on 30 July, Jelić stated: "I am a Croat and will die a Croat. I am not ashamed of that. I am proud of that." A few days later, on 1 August, she was a guest at the concert of Croatian nationalist musician Marko Perković in Drinovci, Bosnia and Herzegovina. On 5 August, she was part of the official state celebration ceremony, raising the flag on the Knin Fortress.

=== Raven Saunders' hand gesture ===
After receiving her silver medal during the medal ceremony, American track and field athlete Raven Saunders raised her arms and crossed them in the shape of an X on the podium. Saunders stated that her demonstration intended to symbolize support for "oppressed" people. As a result, the IOC launched a probe to find if the gesture violated the rules of prohibiting any kind of demonstration or political, religious and racial propaganda in an Olympic site. The United States Olympic Committee defended Saunders' gesture, stating that it did not breach its rules as it was a "peaceful expression in support of racial and social justice (that) was respectful of her competitors". On 4 August 2021, the IOC suspended its investigation on Saunders' gesture following the news of the death of her mother.

=== Chinese athletes wearing Mao Zedong badges ===
During the medal ceremony on 2 August 2021, Chinese cyclists Bao Shanju and Zhong Tianshi, who had won gold at the women's team sprint event, appeared on the podium wearing pin badges with an image of former Chinese leader Mao Zedong. In response, IOC spokesperson Mark Adams said the committee would begin an investigation into the matter, to see if it violated Article 50 of the Olympic Charter which prohibits any kind of demonstration or political, religious and racial propaganda in Olympic venues, and requested the Chinese Olympic Committee to submit a report on the incident. The Chinese Olympic Committee later assured the IOC that this incident would not happen again and stated that it would soon submit a report.

=== False claims of additional doping tests ===
On 26 July, Indian news outlet ANI wrongly reported that Hou Zhihui of China, the new 49 kg weightlifting champion, would be tested by the International Testing Agency (ITA) for doping, according to ANI's unnamed source. Zhihui had won gold in the 49 kg women's weightlifting event, against India's Mirabai Chanu, who won silver. The article also stated that Chanu would be upgraded to a gold medal if the tests were positive. This report was subsequently propagated across other news networks, including The Economic Times, Business Standard, India.com and Taiwan News. The World Anti-Doping Agency and ITA debunked the reports, saying they knew nothing of such tests being carried out and that any developments would be transparently reported on their site. On 30 July, ANI reported that no such test had occurred, and that they had made an "inadvertent error while reporting the news". As of 10 August, ANI's original report of the disavowed test remains on its website.

=== Russian reaction to the results of the women's all-around rhythmic gymnastics ===
The result of the women's rhythmic gymnastics competition was controversial in Russia, as Israeli gold medalist Linoy Ashram had dropped her apparatus during her ribbon routine. The Russian Olympic Committee (ROC) claimed that she did not receive a significant deduction, which would have changed the standings due to the narrow score difference between Ashram and Russian silver medalist Dina Averina. Meanwhile, Olympic judges and supporters of Ashram noted that Ashram's combined overall difficulty was over a point higher than Averina's, allowing Ashram to score well even with a 1-point deduction for dropping the apparatus.

After the results were in, the Russian Olympic Committee (ROC) coaches submitted an inquiry on Dina Averina's ribbon score, but the score was unchanged. Averina commented that she believed the judges were supporting Ashram and punishing her, and she considered herself the champion. This position was universally supported by the Russian state-controlled media, which stated that Averina was the victim of "political games" and was purposefully denied gold, referring it to "the conspiracy against Russia".

=== Medal count controversy ===
American media outlets were criticised on social media for publishing a medal table that ranked countries by total medals won, rather than using the IOC standard of ranking NOCs by gold, then silver, then bronze – but this was nothing new, as it had been the practice of many American media outlets for decades. For instance, the Washington Post placed China second in the 2016 Summer Olympics medal table based on total medals (Great Britain placed second in the gold medal count that is used by most international sources). However, there were some notable exceptions, such as The New York Times switching from total medals in 2012 to gold medals in 2016. Some fans accused American websites of bias, because Team USA was leading the medal count by total medals throughout the entire Games but only topped the gold medal count on the last day of the competition.

In Russia, the gold medal count has always held a predominant role, and the state broadcaster Match TV used it during the 2016 Summer Olympics and midway during the 2020 Summer Olympics. However, closer to the finish of the Olympics, when it became apparent that Russian athletes would only finish fifth in the medal table, Match TV switched to using the overall medal count, where Russia was third.

After the United States overtook China in the gold medal table on the last day of the competition, Andrew Reid of Yahoo Sport Australia and Sam Cooper of Business Insider cited a Chinese state media post on social media showing China coming first in the medal count by adding Hong Kong's and Taiwan's (competing as Chinese Taipei) medals to China's total, even though Hong Kong and Taiwan have separate NOCs.

=== German cycling director racist slur ===
German cycling director Patrick Moster was fired by the German Olympic federation after yelling the racial slur "Get the camel drivers" to the German cyclist Nikias Arndt, who were trying to catch Algerian and Eritrean riders.

=== China–Taiwan tensions ===
A win by Taiwan over China in badminton increased tensions between the two countries. Tensions between China and Taiwan over the Olympics also resulted in increased calls in Taiwan to rename their Olympic team.

Chinese diplomats engaged in wolf warrior diplomacy during the Olympics with issue being taken with the way Chinese athletes were being depicted by the media and by the Taiwanese team being introduced as "Taiwan" instead of Chinese Taipei. The Chinese consulate in New York City complained that NBC had used an inaccurate map of China in their coverage because it did not include Taiwan and the South China Sea. The consulate said that the map "created a very bad influence and harmed the dignity and emotion of the Chinese people". The consulate took to Twitter writing "Using a wrong map of #China is a real lack of common sense. Politicizing sports and violating the Olympics Charter spirits will only do harm to the #Olympic Games and the relationship between the #Chinese and the #Americans."

Chinese diplomats took issue with CNN's coverage of China's first gold medal when it published a headline saying "Gold for China...and more COVID-19 cases".

On August 1 the Embassy of China, London criticized the BBC's coverage of the Olympics, particularly its Taiwan-related coverage. The embassy also condemned a News.com.au article cited by the BBC. The statement said that "The reports on the BBC Chinese website and news.com.au about the participation of 'Chinese Taipei' in Tokyo Olympics are unprofessional and severely misleading. The Chinese side is gravely concerned and strongly opposes this." On August 4 the embassy again criticized the BBC's coverage of Taiwan's participation in the Olympics saying that a BBC article explaining the history of Taiwan's Olympic moniker "Chinese Taipei" had been "sensationalizing the question of the 'Chinese Taipei' team at the Tokyo Olympics" and went on to state "[China] strongly urges these media to follow international consensus and professional conduct, to stop politicizing sports, and to stop interference with the Tokyo Olympic Games."

=== British sprinter doping and de-medaling ===
British sprinter CJ Ujah won a silver medal for the 4 × 100 men's relay event. He was later provisionally suspended for an alleged doping violation after his doping test showed the presence of a prohibited substance S-23 and Enobosarm. On 14 September 2021 it was announced that his 'B' sample tested had also positive, confirming the initial test and "almost certainly" resulting in the relay team being disqualified and losing their medals. On 18 February 2022, having not appealed the findings of the test, the British relay team had their medals officially stripped. Ujah stated that he had "unknowingly consumed a contaminated substance".

=== Nike Vaporfly shoes and accusations of unfair advantage ===
In January 2020, World Athletics issued new guidelines for shoes to be used in the upcoming Olympics. The Nike Vaporfly shoe became the focus of claims that they were a form of technology doping and provided athletes an unfair advantage, but the shoes were not banned.

== Others ==
=== Food waste ===
Mass disposal of uneaten meals meant for staff and volunteers, up to 130,000 lunch boxes, which accounted for 25% of total meals prepared, occurred between 3 July and 3 August. It took about a month to reduce the waste.

=== Chinese swimming team doping controversy ===
On 20 April 2024, The New York Times revealed that 23 members of the Chinese swimming team tested positive for the performance enhancing drug trimetazidine seven months prior to the start of the games and were allowed to participate in the games with some of the swimmers winning medals. Following the publication of the report, Travis Tygart, CEO of the United States Anti-Doping Agency, accused the World Anti-Doping Agency (WADA) and the China Anti-Doping Agency (CHINADA) of covering up doping by Chinese swimmers. In response to Tygart's comments, WADA stated that it "stands by the results of its rigorous scientific investigation" into the case and was "astonished by the outrageous, completely false and defamatory remarks while CHINADA stated that the reports were misleading and that the doping tests they conducted only found that the swimmers had only tested extremely low concentration of Trimetazidine which was due to contamination at the hotel they were residing at that time", although any amount of the substance is enough for a ban. In a second statement, Tygart accused both WADA and the CHINADA of not being transparent about the findings and keeping "clean athletes in the dark". WADA was accused of having a double standard as Russian figure skater Kamila Valieva tested positive for TMZ and used the same excuse, but was immediately banned for four years. On 25 April 2024, WADA announced that Eric Cottier, a Swiss attorney, would launch an independent investigation into the matter, which also drew criticism since he was hand-picked by WADA. In May 2024, WADA announced that it hold an extraordinary meeting to discuss the doping case of the Chinese swimmers.

During the 2024 Summer Olympics, British swimming star Adam Peaty questioned China's performances, alluding to the alleged cover-up of positive doping cases by Chinese swimmers, and expressing dissatisfaction with the World Anti-Doping Agency's efforts to combat cheating in sports. American swimmer Caeleb Dressel said the following emphasized the need to put trust in WADA and said that he was mainly focused on racing really tough, acknowledging that China were the better team.

== See also ==
- Toyosu Market (relocation of Tsukiji fish market for 2020 Olympics provoked multiple issues including pollution)
- Impact of the COVID-19 pandemic on sports
- Impact of the COVID-19 pandemic on television
