= Théâtre de Liège =

Coordinates: 50.6407°N 5.5746°E

- Interactive map of Théâtre de Liège
- Address: Place Saint-Lambert; Liège; Belgium
- Owner: Government of Liège
- Operator: Serge Rangoni

Construction
- Opened: 2013
- Architect: Julien Koenig

Website
- https://www.theatredeliege.be/

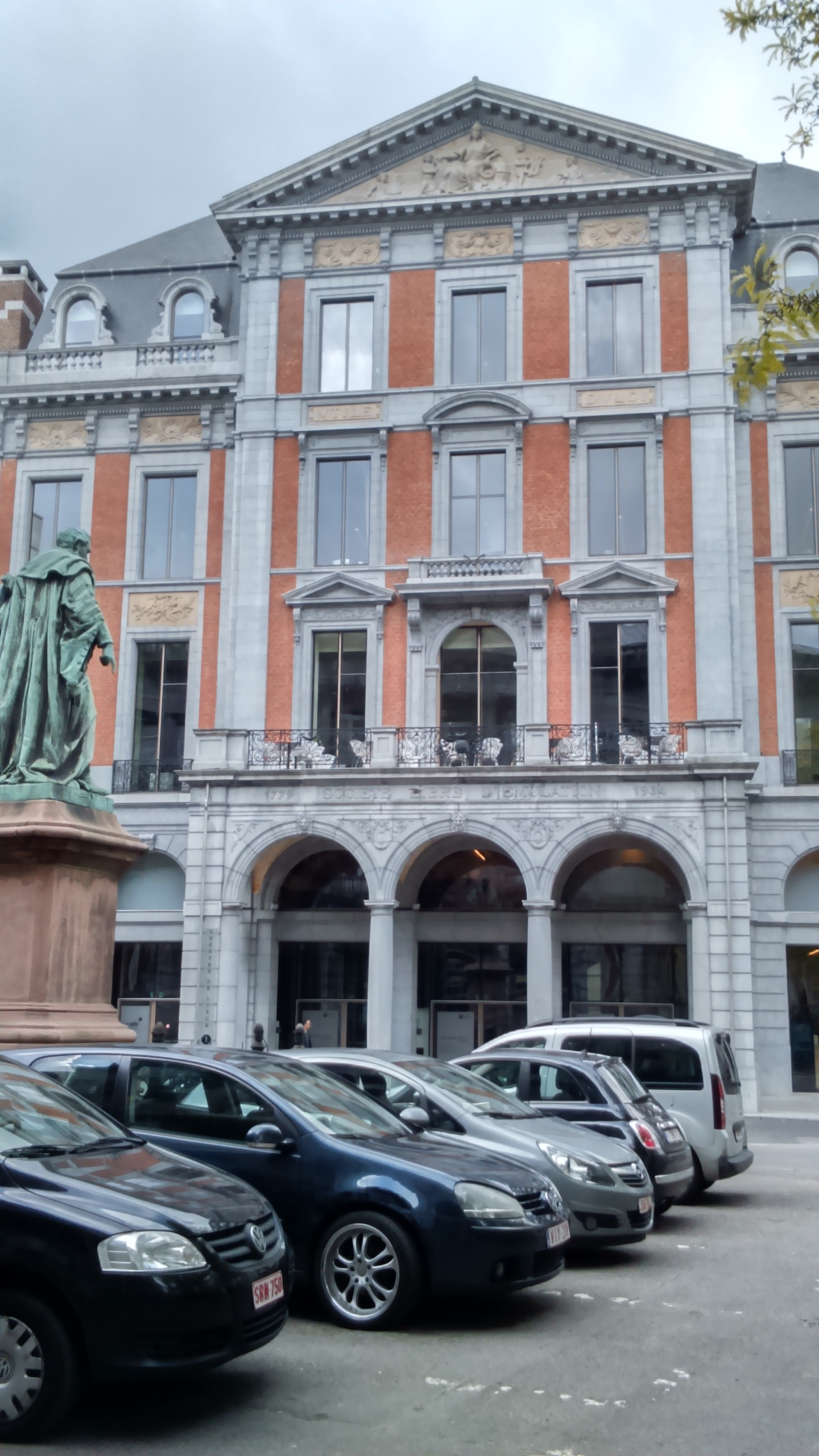
Théâtre de Liège

Théâtre de Liège is a theatre in Liège, Belgium.

The theatre briefly became the subject of notoriety in July 2015 after it was found that its logo, designed by local designer Olivier Debie, had been plagiarized by the designer of the emblem for the 2020 Summer Olympics in Tokyo. Debie filed a lawsuit against the International Olympic Committee to prevent use of the infringing logo, which was withdrawn in September 2015 and replaced by a new design.
