= NXP Semiconductors =

Dutch semiconductor manufacturer

NXP Semiconductors N.V.

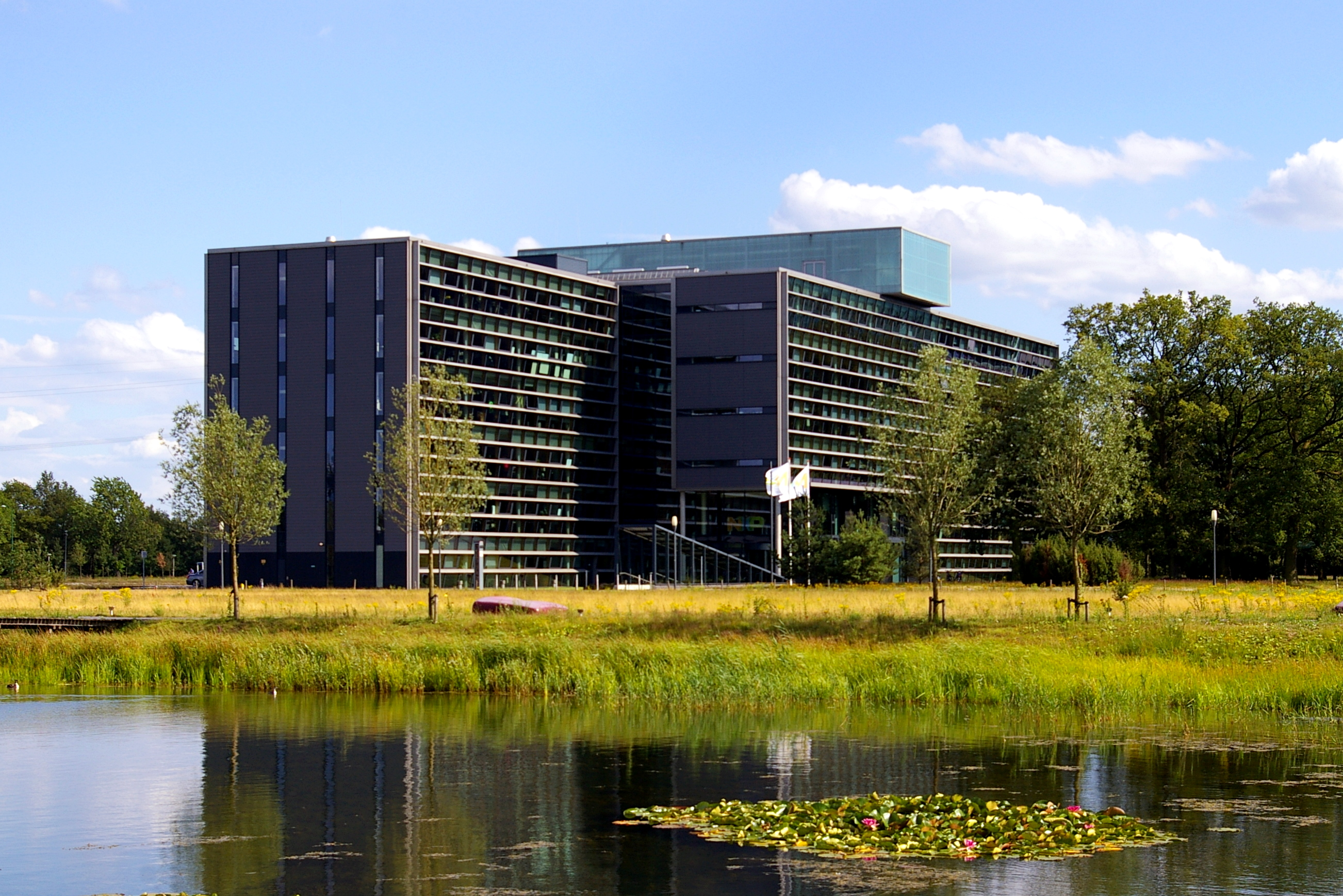
- Headquarters in Eindhoven, Netherlands
- Type: Public
- Traded as: Nasdaq: NXPI; Nasdaq-100 component; S&P 500 component
- Industry: Semiconductors
- Founded: 2006; 20 years ago, as a spin-off of Philips
- Headquarters: High Tech Campus, Eindhoven, Netherlands
- Key people: Julie Southern (chair); Rafael Sotomayor (president and CEO)
- Products: Integrated circuits
- Revenue: ▼US$12.3 billion (2025)
- Operating income: ▼US$3.05 billion (2025)
- Net income: ▼US$2.02 billion (2025)
- Total assets: ▲US$26.6 billion (2025)
- Total equity: ▲US$10.1 billion (2025)
- Number of employees: 32,169 (2025)
- Website: nxp.com

NXP Semiconductors N.V. is a Dutch multinational semiconductor manufacturing and design company with headquarters in Eindhoven, Netherlands. It is the second-largest European semiconductor design and manufacturing company by market capitalization as of 2024. The company employs approximately 34,000 people in more than 30 countries and it reported revenues of $12.61 billion in 2024. The company's name is an abbreviation of Next eXPerience. NXP customers include Apple, Dell, Ericsson and Samsung.

The company's origins date back to the 1950s as part of the electronics company Philips, which had been an early participant in the European semiconductor market. In 1987, Philips had become the largest semiconductor manufacturer in Europe, and one of the world's largest semiconductor companies by the end of the 20th century. During 2006, Phillips Semiconductors was spun-off from Philips via an arrangement with a consortium of private equity investors. Adopting the name NXP, the firm completed an initial public offering in 2010, its shares being traded on Nasdaq under the ticker symbol "NXPI". NXP co-invented near field communication (NFC) technology.

== History ==
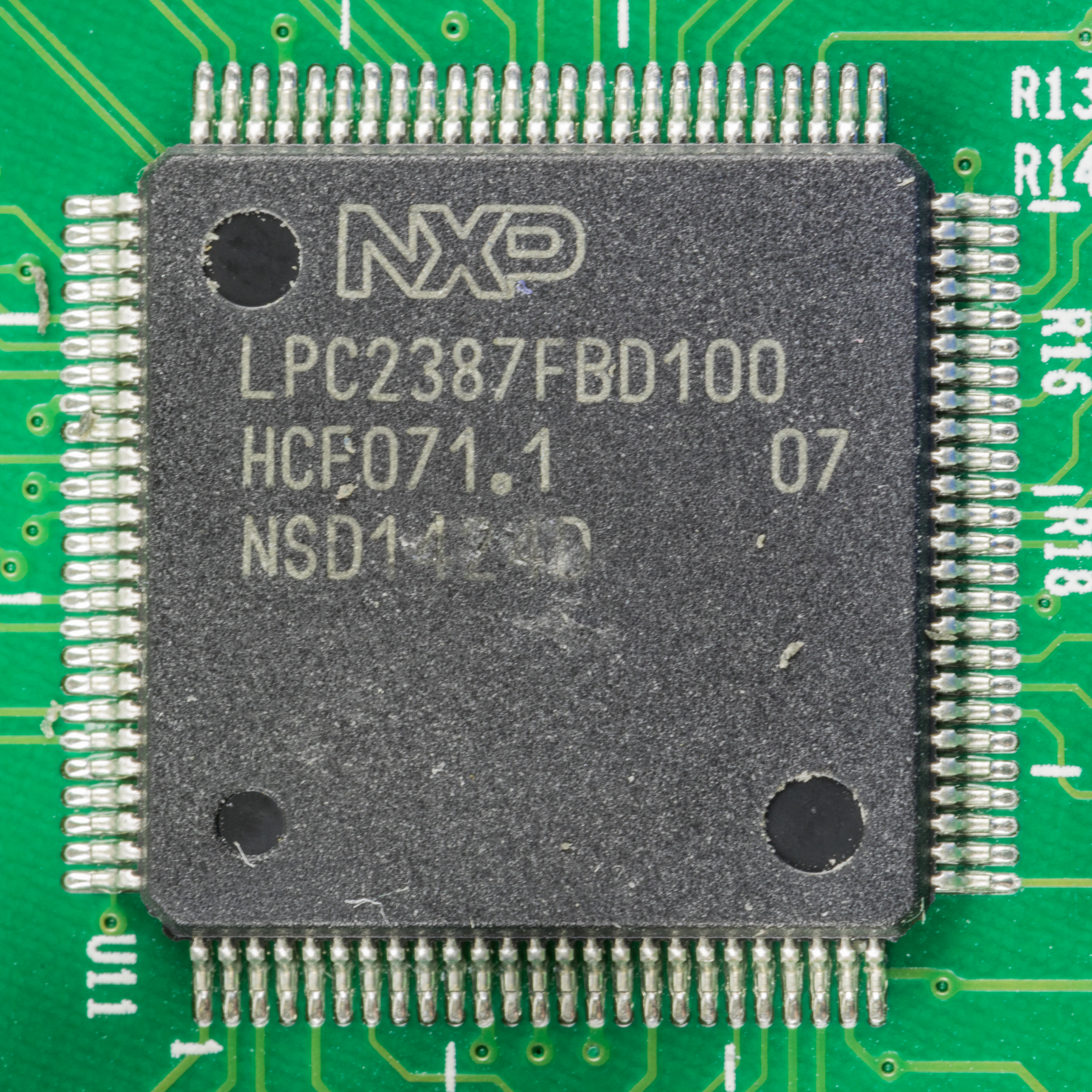
Arm7 microcontroller for embedded applications

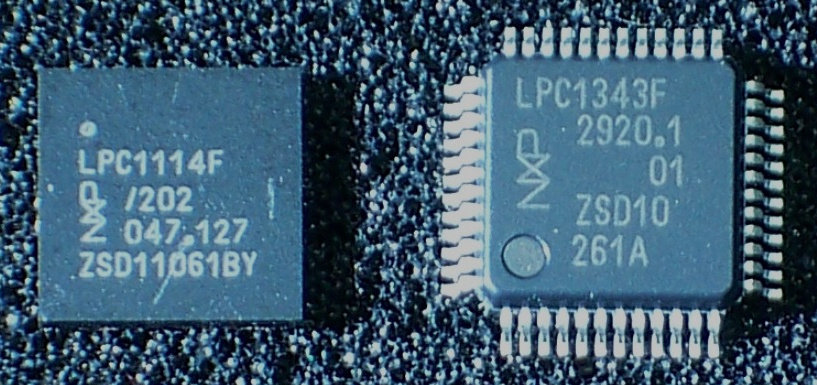
NXP LPC1114 in 33-pin HVQFN package and LPC1343 in 48-pin LQFP package, both ARM Cortex-M microcontrollers

=== Within Philips ===
In 1953, the Dutch technology company Philips started a small scale production facility in the center of the city of Nijmegen as part of its main industry group "Icoma" (Industrial Components and Materials). By the early 1950s, it had acquired a strong position in the European semiconductor market. However, by the end of the decade, this lead had been effectively lost to other companies across increasingly competitive transistor market, compelling Phillip's management team to adopt a new strategy. Changes in its R&D and manufacturing capabilities soon enabled the company to deliver point-contact and layer transistors to the market as well as to develop its own high-frequency transistor.

By the early 1960s, Philips' capacity to innovate in the field of applications as well as adapt transistor requirements to suit customer needs had been hampered by its organizational structure. In 1965, Icoma became part of a new Philips main industry group "Elcoma" (Electronic Components and Materials). In 1975, Silicon Valley–based Signetics was acquired by Philips. Signetics claimed to be the "first company in the world established expressly to make and sell integrated circuits" and inventor of the 555 timer IC. At the time, it was claimed that through the Signetics acquisition, Philips had become the second largest semiconductor manufacturer in the world.

In 1987, Philips became Europe's largest semiconductor manufacturer. One year later, all of Philips semiconductor subsidiaries, including Signetics, Faselec (in Switzerland) and Mullard (in the UK), were merged in the newly formed product division Components. In 1991, the semiconductor activities were split off from Components under the name Philips Semiconductors. In 1992, Philips and Motorola established the Semiconductor Miniature Products factory in Seremban, Malaysia, as a joint venture.

In June 1999, Philips acquired VLSI Technology in exchange for $1 billion; this transaction resulted in Philips becoming the world's sixth largest semiconductor company.

=== Independent company ===
==== 2000s ====
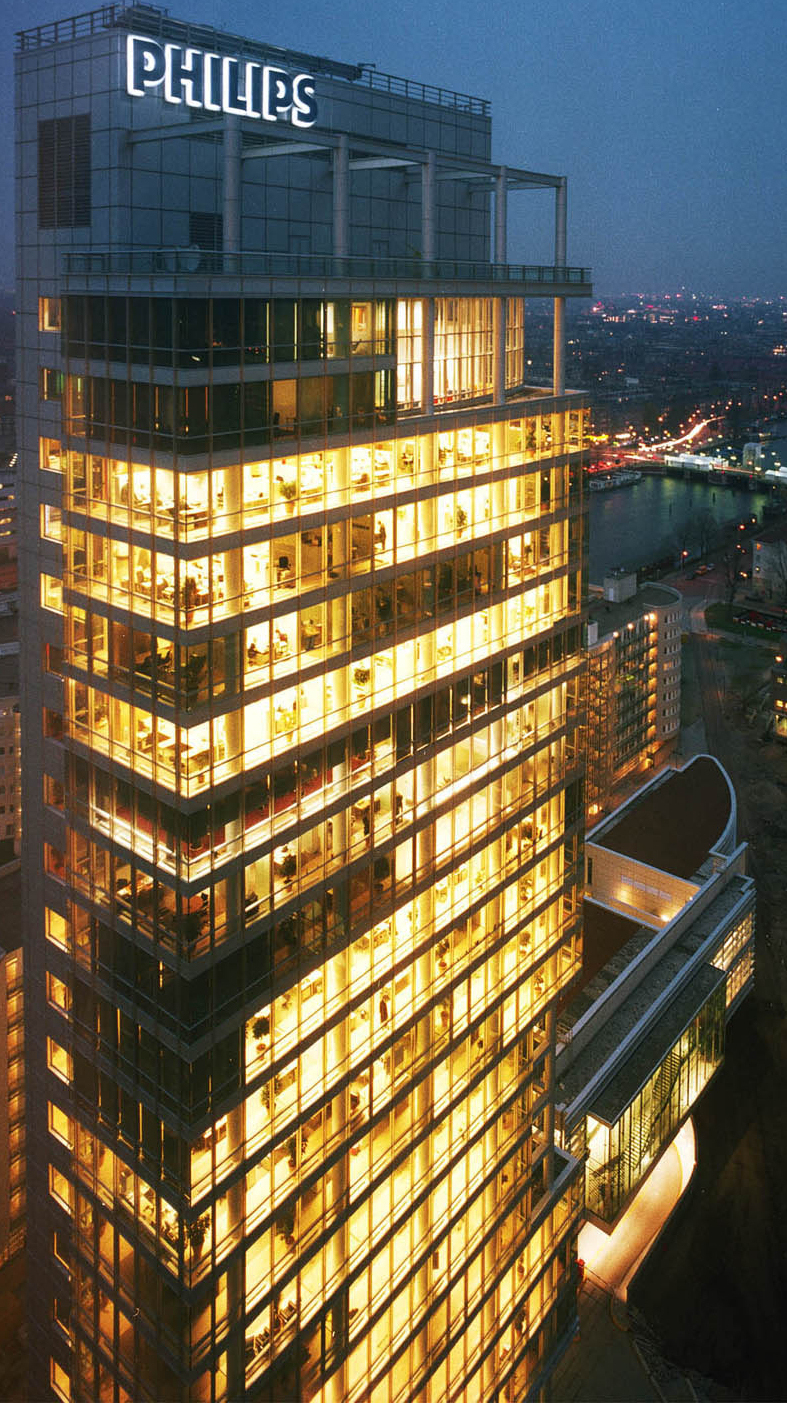
NXP was spun-off by Philips

In December 2005, Philips announced its intention to spin-off Philips Semiconductors into an independent legal entity. In September 2006, Philips completed the sale of an 80.1 percent stake in Philips Semiconductors to a consortium of private equity investors consisting of KKR, Bain Capital, Silver Lake Partners, Apax Partners and AlpInvest Partners. The new company name NXP (from Next eXPerience) was announced on 31 August 2006, and the company was officially launched during the Internationale Funkausstellung (IFA) consumer electronics show in Berlin. The newly independent NXP was ranked as one of the world's top 10 semiconductor companies.

In February 2007, NXP announced that it would acquire Silicon Laboratories’ AeroFONE single-chip phone and power amplifier product lines to strengthen its Mobile and Personal business in exchange for $285 million in cash. The next year, NXP announced that it would transform its Mobile and Personal business unit into a joint venture with STMicroelectronics; in 2009, following ST's purchase of NXP's 20 percent stake, this business unit became ST-Ericsson, which was itself a 50/50 joint venture of Ericsson Mobile Platforms and STMicroelectronics. In April 2008, NXP announced it would acquire the set-top box business of Conexant to complement its existing Home business unit. In September 2008, NXP announced that it would restructure its manufacturing, R&D and back office operations, resulting in 4,500 job cuts worldwide. In October 2009, NXP announced that it would sell its Home business unit to Trident Microsystems.

NXP was the co-inventor of near field communication (NFC) technology, along with Sony and Inside Secure, and had supplied NFC chip sets that enables mobile phones to be used to pay for goods, and store and exchange data securely. NXP manufactures such chips for eGovernment applications such as electronic passports; RFID tags and labels; and transport and access management, with the chip set and contactless card for MIFARE used by many major public transit systems worldwide.

==== 2010s ====
On 26 July 2010, NXP announced the acquisition of the British RF specialist Jennic. One month late, NXP announced its initial public offering on the Nasdaq, which involved 34 million shares priced at $14 each. In December 2010, NXP announced that the pending sale of its Sound Solutions business to Knowles Electronics, part of Dover Corporation, for $855 million in cash.

In April 2012, NXP announced its intent to acquire electronic design consultancy Catena to work on automotive applications. Three months later, NXP sold its high-speed data converter assets to Integrated Device Technology. During 2012, revenue for NXP's Identification business unit reached $986 million, a 41 percent rise from 2011, which was partially attributed to the growing sales of NFC chips and secure elements. On 4 January 2013, NXP and Cisco announced their investment in Cohda Wireless, an Australian company focused on car-to-car and car-to-infrastructure communications. That same month, NXP announced it would enact between 700 and 900 redundancies worldwide in an effort to cut costs related to "support services". In May 2013, NXP announced that it acquired Code Red Technologies, a provider of embedded software development such as the LPCXpresso IDE and Red Suite.

On 23 December 2013, NXP Semiconductors was added to the Nasdaq-100 index.

In July 2014, NXP reported to have terminated the employment of union organizers, and a campaign was started for their reinstatement. One year later, a joint venture with the Beijing JianGuang Asset Management Co. Ltd. was registered in Shanghai, China under the name WeEn Semiconductors. WeEn Semiconductors has been involved in the production of bipolar and SiC power semiconductors, TRIACs, and IGBT modules.

In March 2015, a merger agreement was announced between NXP and Freescale Semiconductor.

On 14 June 2016, it was announced that Nexperia would be divested from NXP to a consortium of financial investors consisting of Beijing Jianguang Asset Management Co., Ltd (“JAC Capital”) and Wise Road Capital LTD (“Wise Road Capital”). Prior to the divestiture of Nexperia, NXP has been a volume supplier of discrete and standard logic devices, celebrating its 50 years in logic (via its history as both Signetics and Philips Semiconductors) in March 2012.

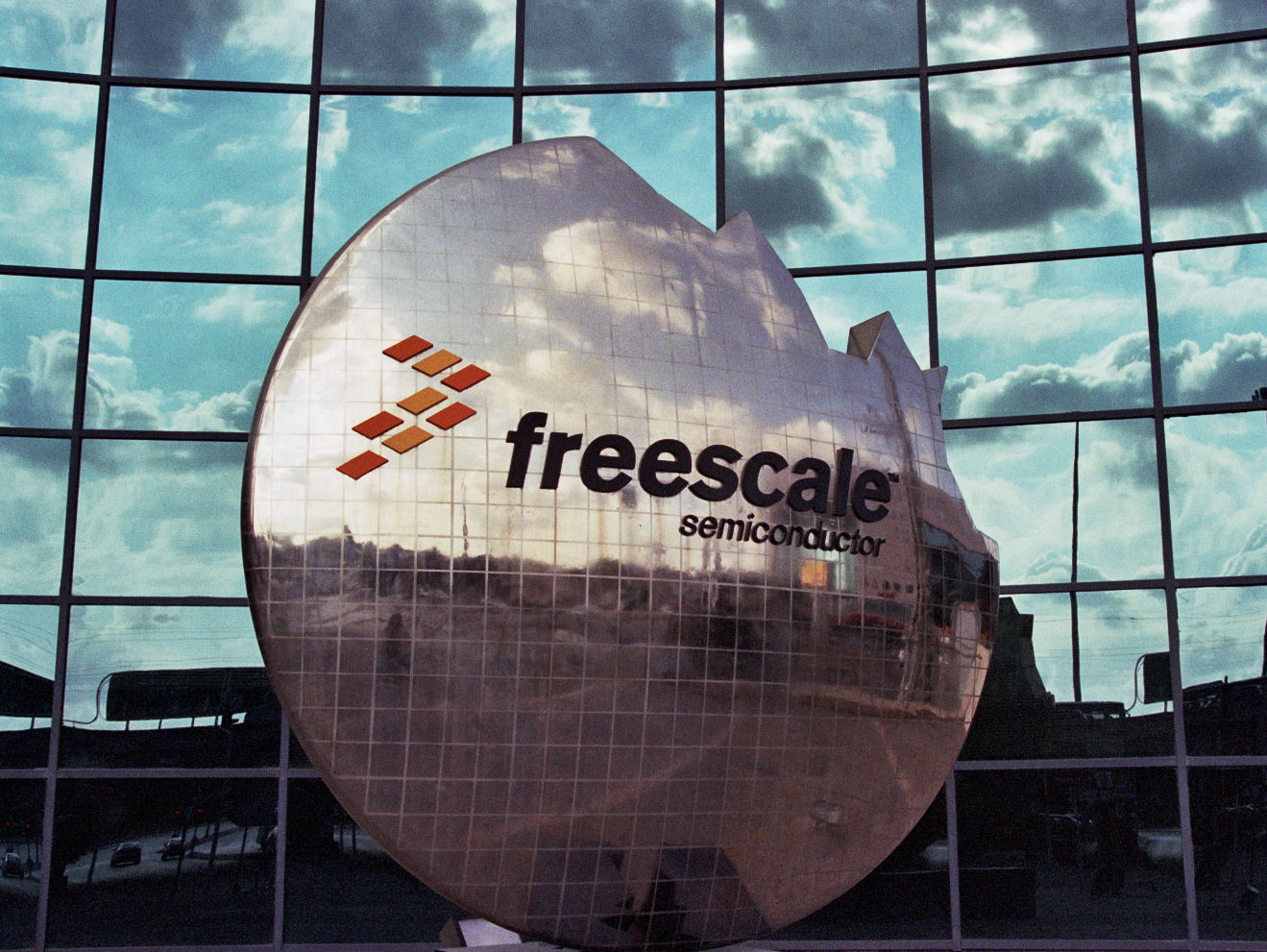
Freescale Semiconductors

In March 2015, a merger agreement was announced through which NXP would merge with competitor Freescale Semiconductor. As part of the merger, NXP's RF Power activities were sold to JAC Capital for US$1.8 billion and rebranded as Ampleon, in a transaction closed in November 2015. Both NXP and Freescale had deep roots stretching back to when they were part of Philips (NXP), and Motorola (Freescale) respectively. Both had similar revenue; US$4.8 billion and US$4.2 billion in 2013 for NXP and Freescale, respectively with NXP primarily focusing on near field communication (NFC) and high-performance mixed signal (HPMS) hardware, and Freescale focusing on its microprocessor and microcontroller businesses, and both companies possessing roughly equal patent portfolios. On 7 December 2015, NXP completed the merger with Freescale Semiconductor; the merged company continued its operation as NXP Semiconductors N.V.

On 27 October 2016, it was announced that Qualcomm would attempt to buy NXP for $44 billion, which at that time would have been the biggest semiconductor takeover globally. In April 2017, Qualcomm received approval from U.S. antitrust regulators for the acquisition of NXP for $47 billion. The acquisition still required the approval of Chinese authorities, thus Qualcomm refiled an antitrust application and request to purchase with the Chinese Ministry of Commerce. However, Qualcomm subsequently chose to cancel the acquisition entirely on 26 July 2018.

In order to protect against potential hackers, NXP offers gateways to automotive manufacturers that prevent communication with every network within a car independently. The i.MX 8 was announced in early 2017, based around three products; all versions includes one or two Cortex-A72 CPU cores and all versions includes two Cortex-M4F CPU cores.

In September 2018, NXP announced that it acquired OmniPHY, a provider of automotive Ethernet subsystem technology. On 6 December 2019, NXP announced the completion of the acquisition of the wireless connectivity assets from Marvell Technology.

During 2019, NXP acquired the wireless connectivity assets of Marvell Technology.

==== 2020s ====
On 18 June 2020, NXP announced HoverGames Challenge 2: Help Drones Help Others. One month later, NXP delivered secure and scalable edge-connected platforms based on its i.MX RT crossover processors and Wi-Fi/Bluetooth solutions.

In 2021, NXP was added to the S&P 500 stock index.

On 5 January 2023, NXP introduced industry-first 28 nm RFCMOS radar one-chip for safety-critical advanced driver-assistance system (ADAS) applications, with DENSO leveraging it to build advanced ADAS platforms. NXP and Foxconn opened a joint laboratory in December 2023 in the Foxconn Nankan Facility in Taiwan, marking a new milestone in the companies’ strategic collaboration for software-defined electric vehicle development.

== Leadership ==
NXP's first CEO was Frans van Houten; he was succeeded by Richard L. Clemmer on 1 January 2009. From May 2020 until 2025, Kurt Sievers served as president and CEO. Rafael Sotomayor took over as president in April 2025, and then as CEO in October 2025.

== Worldwide sites ==
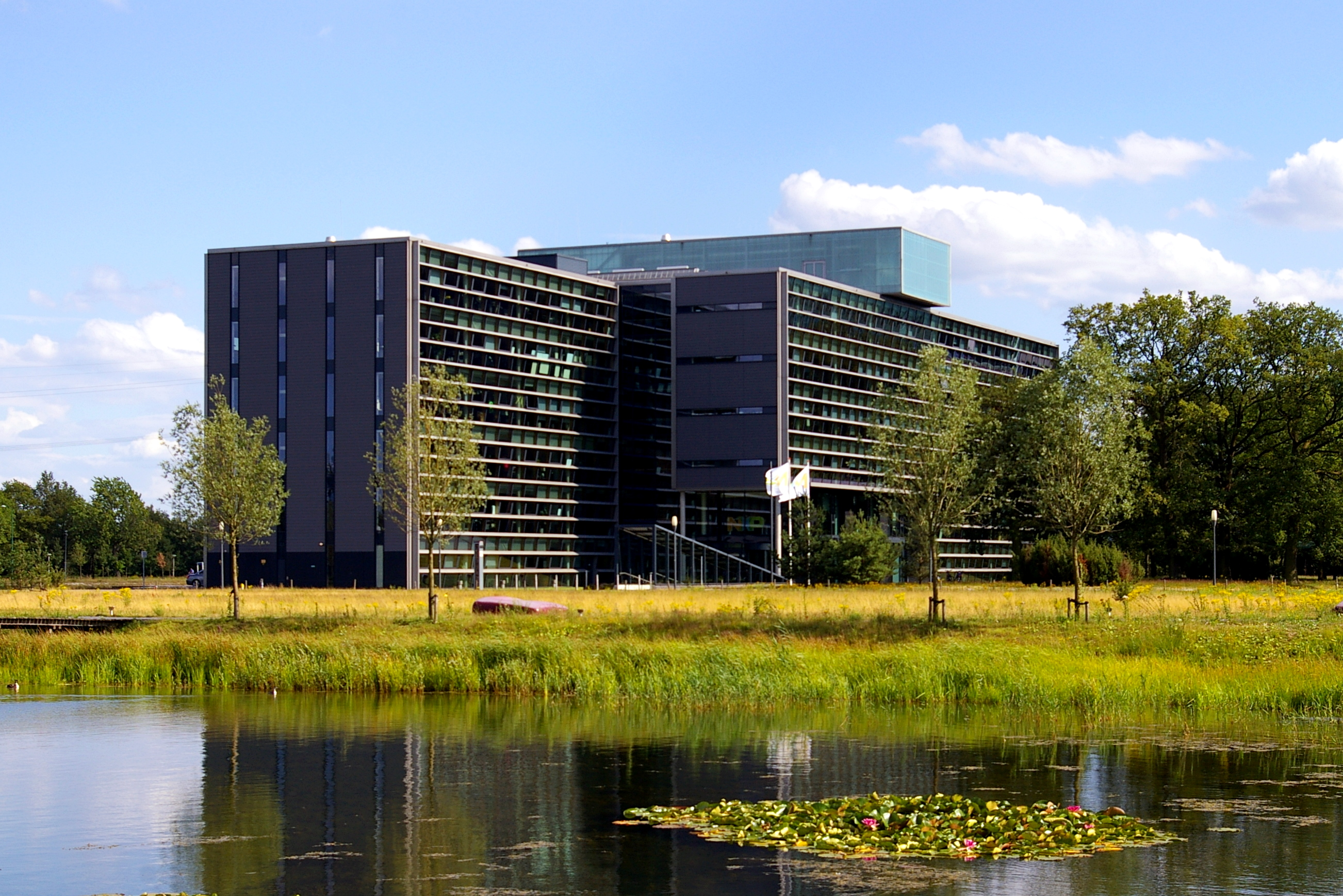
NXP headquarters in Eindhoven, Netherlands, July 2011

NXP Semiconductors is headquartered in Eindhoven, Netherlands, and has numerous international locations.

=== Wafer fabs ===
- Chandler, Arizona, United States
- Austin, Texas, United States
- Nijmegen, Netherlands
- Singapore (SSMC)

=== R&D ===
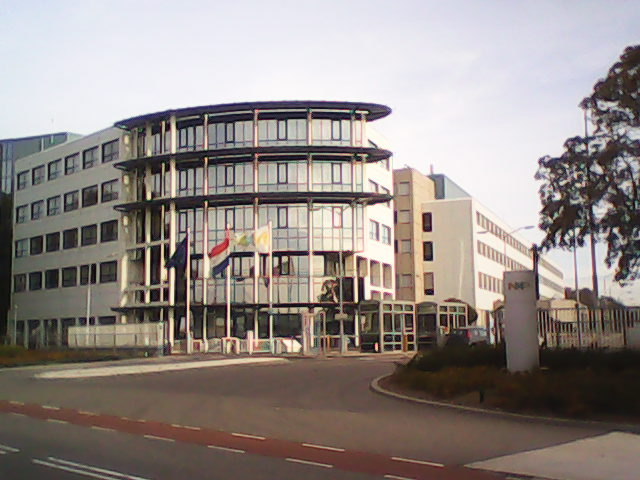
NXP Nijmegen

- Eindhoven (HQ)
- Nijmegen
- San Jose, California
- Austin, Texas
- Chandler, Arizona
- San Diego
- Novi, Michigan
- Kanata, Ontario
- Gratkorn
- Milan
- Catania
- Leuven
- Delft
- Brno
- Rožnov pod Radhoštěm
- Bucharest
- Caen
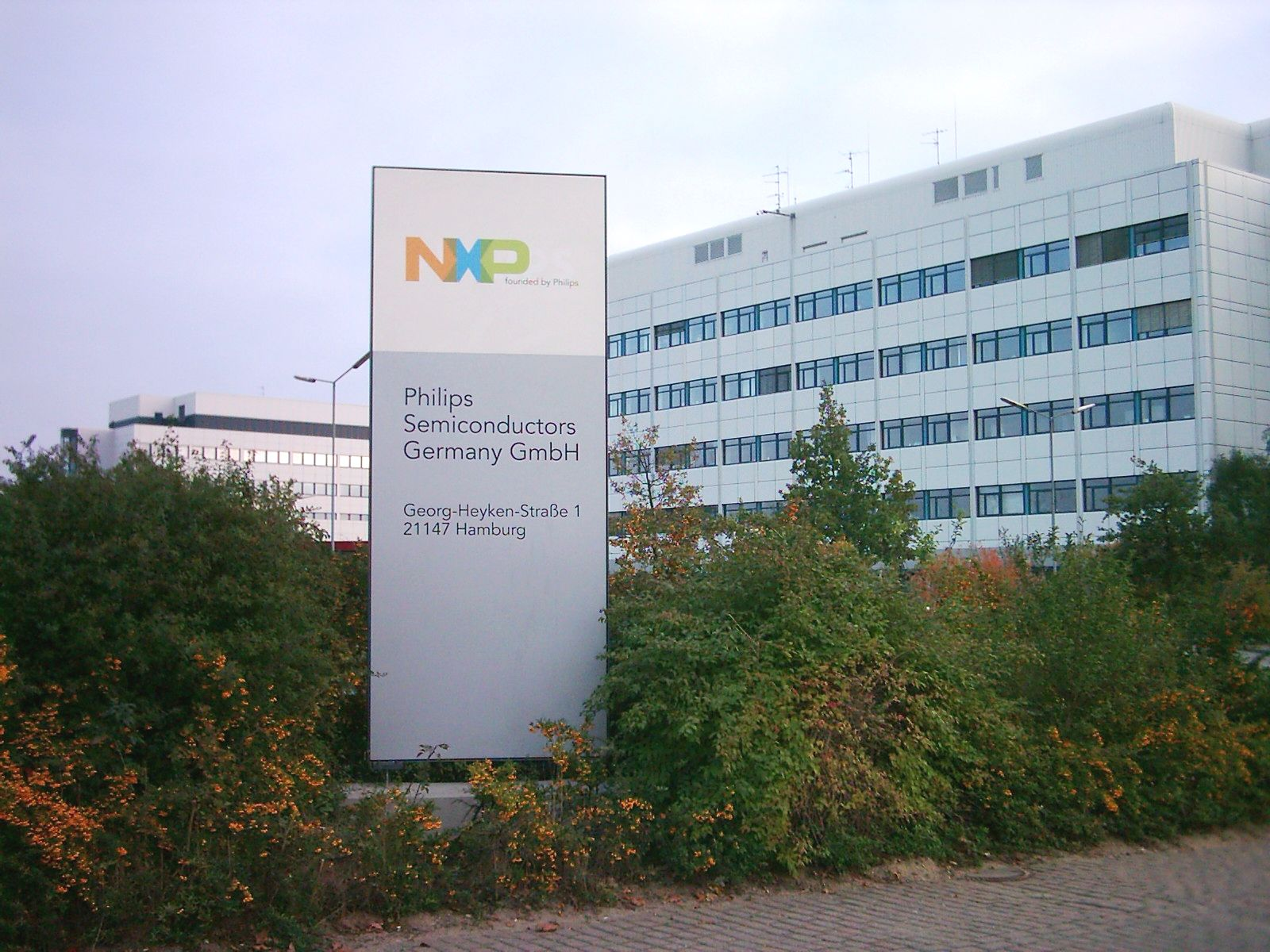
  NXP Hamburg (Germany HQ)
- Mougins
- Toulouse
- Grenoble
- Sophia Antipolis
- Dresden
- Hamburg
- Munich
- Southampton
- Glasgow
- Yokneam Illit
- Bengaluru
- Pune
- Hyderabad
- Noida

=== Test and assembly ===
- Bangkok, Thailand
- Kaohsiung, Taiwan
- Petaling Jaya, Malaysia
- Tianjin, China

=== Sales ===
- San Jose, California
- San Diego
- Novi, Michigan
- Irvine, California
- Woburn, Massachusetts
- Guadalajara
- Kanata, Ontario
- Beijing
- Hong Kong
- Tokyo
- Singapore
- Seoul
- Paris
- Sindelfingen

=== Joint ventures ===
- VSMC
- European Semiconductor Manufacturing Company (ESMC)
- Systems on Silicon Manufacturing Company (SSMC) Pte. Ltd. (61%)
- Datang NXP Semiconductors Co., Ltd. (49%)
- Advanced Semiconductor Manufacturing Co. Ltd. (27%)
- Cohda Wireless Pty Ltd. (23%)

== Controversies ==
In March 2013, NXP locked out workers at its plant in Bangkok, Thailand, due to stalled negotiations over a new work schedule with their trade union, which was affiliated with the Confederation of Thai Electrical Appliances, Electronic Automobile & Metalworkers (TEAM). Management then called in small groups of workers, asked them if they agreed with the union's demands, and told them to leave if they did. They were not able to enter the factory the next day. In response, TEAM staged protests outside the factory and on March 13 outside the Dutch embassy and also filed a complaint with the National Human Right Commission. On April 29, mediation by the Ministry of Labour led to the signing of a memorandum that passed the decision over the work schedule to the Labour Relations Committee. The committee decided on June 20 that the new work schedule did not violate Thai labour law; however, the National Human Rights Committee decided otherwise and recommended the factory should revert to the old schedule. NXP continues to demand regular 12-hour shifts.

In May 2014, the company fired 24 workers at its plant in the special economic zone in Cabuyao, The Philippines. The workers were all officials of a trade union affiliated with the Metal Workers Alliance of the Philippines (MWAP). Reports said they were fired due to their union functions in negotiations for a new collective bargaining agreement. Factory owners claimed the workers were fired after refusing to work on 9 April, while workers said they had not been paid for two months. IndustriALL and its affiliated unions in the Philippines condemned the dismissals. In September, MWAP and NXP reached an agreement by which 12 of the fired workers were reinstated and the other 12 received separation packages. NXP also committed itself to a long-term wage increase. In the summer of 2015, a member of the Dutch parliament questioned trade minister Lilianne Ploumen regarding NXP's behaviour.

== See also ==
- NXP MIFARE contactless smart cards and proximity cards
- NXP LPC microcontrollers
- NXP QorIQ microprocessors
- NXP GreenChip
