= Teams (disambiguation) =

Teams are groups of individuals (human or non-human) working together to achieve their goal.

TEAMS or teams may also refer to:

- Microsoft Teams, a computing platform for businesses and education
- TEAMS (cable system), a Kenyan fibre optic cable system
- Tests of Engineering Aptitude, Mathematics, and Science, a competition sponsored by Junior Engineering Technical Society
- Texas Educational Assessment of Minimum Skills, a standardized test used in Texas prior to 1990
- TEAMS, "The Consortium for the Teaching of the Middle Ages", originally a committee of the Medieval Academy of America

== See also ==
- Team (disambiguation) (including senses of TEAM)
