= James Clemmer =

American theater manager (died 1942)

James Clemmer (died 1942) was a vaudeville and movie theater manager at the film industry's start in the Pacific Northwest of the United States. His home, the Clemmer house (1909), is a Spanish Mission style residence, also referred to as a "hybrid Mission Revival", that was later converted to a bed and breakfast hotel.

Clemmer managed the Fifth Avenue theater (1925-1926) (designed by Robert C. Reamer), the Winter Garden, the Music Box (1928-1930) (designed by Henry W. Bittman), various Blue Mouse theaters, the Music Hall, one of Portland, Oregon's Paramount theaters (1928) (designed by Rapp & Rapp with Priteca & Peters), and the Orpheum (1926-1927) (designed by B. Marcus Priteka). Clemmer owned at least two theaters including the Dream Theater in Seattle's Kenneth Hotel (the first in the U.S. to feature a pipe organ) and built the Clemmer Theater (1912). Theater chain owner John Hamrick called him "the best theater manager I ever knew
