= David Clemmer =

Canadian born celebrity style expert

David Clemmer is a Canadian born celebrity style expert.

== Career ==
Clemmer is best known for his role on the international hit makeover show Style by Jury. Other TV appearances include his role as a co-host on Slice Network's Make Me Over Make Me Under, and numerous expert turns sharing style advice and red carpet commentary on media including Entertainment Tonight Canada, Star TV, Canada AM and Steven & Chris.
