= Richard L. Clemmer =

American business executive

- Born: c. 1951
- Education: Texas Tech University; Southern Methodist University's Cox School of Business
- Occupation: Businessman

Richard L. Clemmer (born c. 1952) is an American business executive. He was the chief executive officer of NXP Semiconductors from 2009 to 2020.

== Career ==
In 2018, Clemmer was listed in the inaugural EDGE 50, naming the world's top 50 influencers in edge computing.

In 2016, Clemmer had the great honor to receive for NXP the first Stop Slavery Award in London.
