= Confederation of Thai Electrical Appliances, Electronic Automobile & Metalworkers =

Trade union federation of electrical, electronic and metalworkers in Thailand

TEAM
- Location: Thailand
- Members: 75,000
- Key people: Chalee Loysong, President
- Affiliations: Confederation of Industrial Labour of Thailand, IndustriALL Global Union

The Confederation of Thai Electrical Appliances, Electronic Automobile & Metalworkers (TEAM) is a trade union federation of workers in metalworking and the electronics and automotive industries based in Thailand. The trade union federation is a founding member of the Confederation of Industrial Labour of Thailand and affiliated with the IndustriALL Global Union.

== Organisation ==
TEAM comprises three member unions: the Federation of Thailand Automobile Workers Union, the Electronic Appliance Workers' Federation of Thailand and the Metalworks Workers' Federation of Thailand.

The trade union federation is organised as a loose coordination center formed on the basis of mutual trust among union leaders. It is not formally registered with any government agency.

== History ==
In September 2012, negotiations started between a TEAM-affiliated trade union and management at a NXP Semiconductors plant in Bangkok over a new work schedule that included regular 12-hour shifts. After negotiations stalled, NXP locked out workers on March 1, 2013. Management called in small groups of workers, asked them if they agreed with the union's demands, and told them to leave if they did. They were not able to enter the factory the next day. In response, the union staged protests outside the factory and on March 13 outside the Dutch embassy and also filed a complaint with the National Human Right Commission. On April 29, mediation by the Ministry of Labour led to the signing of a memorandum that passed the decision over the work schedule to the Labor Relations Committee. The committee decided on June 20 that the new work schedule did not violate Thai labour law; however, the National Human Rights Committee decided otherwise and recommended the factory should revert to the old schedule. NXP continues to demand regular 12-hour shifts.

TEAM was a founding member of the Confederation of Industrial Labour of Thailand in 2013.

In December 2016, workers formed a TEAM-affiliated trade union at a factory owned by Japanese firm Yamashita Rubber. The company immediately isolated union members in the night shift and, after they refused to resign, firing 32 of them. The company also offered bribes to the union president to dissolve the union and set up cameras to conduct surveillance on union members. Though the Labor Relations Committee ruled in favour of the workers, the company did not reinstate them. The company filed a defamation charge against the union's president for social media posts and then fired him because there were active criminal charges against him. IndustriALL Global Union condemned the crackdown.

In December 2017, Mitsubishi Electric, partner of the 2020 Olympic games, locked 1,800 TEAM members out of a Thailand plant. The company also forced workers to attend eleven days of humiliating training at a military camp and cleaning old people's homes, among others, and forced them to publicly apologise to the company on social media. Most of the workers were reinstated in January 2018. IndustriALL Global Union condemned the harassment and filed a complaint with the Olympic's Organising Committee.
