= 131st IOC Session =

Meeting of the International Olympic Committee

The official banner of the 131st IOC Session.

The 131st IOC Session took place between 13 and 16 September 2017 at the Lima Convention Centre in Lima, Peru. The host cities for the 2024 and 2028 Summer Olympics were elected during the 131st IOC Session on 13 September 2017.

== Bidders ==
At the 127th IOC Session in 2014, Lima, Peru, was selected as session host by the IOC general assembly over Helsinki, Finland, by 54 votes to 30.

== Host city elections ==
Two Olympic host city elections took place at the 131st IOC Session. The host cities of the 2024 and 2028 Summer Olympics were elected.

=== 2024 Summer Olympics ===
The only candidate city for the 2024 Summer Olympics, Paris, France, was elected during the 131st IOC Session. The two French IOC members, Guy Drut and Tony Estanguet were not eligible to vote in this host city election under the rules of the Olympic Charter.

Candidate city

- (France) Paris

2024 Summer Olympics bidding results
City	Nation	Votes
Paris	France	Unanimous

=== 2028 Summer Olympics ===
The only candidate city for the 2028 Summer Olympics, Los Angeles, United States, was elected during the 131st IOC Session. The three American IOC members, Anita DeFrantz, Angela Ruggiero and Larry Probst were not eligible to vote in this host city election under the rules of the Olympic Charter.

Candidate city

- (United States) Los Angeles

2028 Summer Olympics bidding results
City	Nation	Votes
Los Angeles	United States	Unanimous

=== 134th IOC Session ===
Milan was elected as the host city of the 134th IOC Session in 2019. The 134th IOC Session would decide the host city for the 2026 Winter Olympics. Milan eventually decided to bid along with Cortina D'Ampezzo for the 2026 Winter Olympics against Stockholm and Åre of Sweden. As a result, the 134th IOC Session was moved to Lausanne. Milan and Cortina, won the rights to host the 2026 Winter Games at the 134th Session in 2019.

== Election of the new IOC members ==
Eight new IOC members were elected at the session.

The eight new members who were elected are:

- (Palau) Baklai Temengil
- (Norway) Kristin Kloster Aasen
- (Thailand) Khunying Patama Leeswadtrakul
- (Dominican Republic) Luis Mejía Oviedo
- (Chile) Neven Iván Ilic Álvarez
- (Oman) Sheikh Khalid Muhammad Al-Zubair
- (France) Jean-Christophe Rolland
- (Belgium) Ingmar De Vos

== Election of the new IOC Executive Board members ==
Two IOC members were elected to the IOC Executive Board at the session.

Denis Oswald and Nicole Hoevertsz were elected to the executive board. Anita DeFrantz was elected to a four-year term as a vice-president, succeeding John Coates, who concluded his term as a vice-president.

== Ethics Commission ==
New members were appointed.

- (South Korea) Ban Ki-moon: chairman
- (United States) Angela Ruggiero
- (China) Hanqin Xue
- (Switzerland) Samuel Schmid
- (Fiji) Robin Mitchell

== See also ==
- 125th IOC Session
- 128th IOC Session
- 130th IOC Session
- 132nd IOC Session
