= 97th IOC Session =

The 97th International Olympic Committee Session, officially known as the XCVII Session of the IOC, was held from 12–16 June 1991 at the International Convention Centre in Birmingham, England, in the United Kingdom. At the session, Nagano, Japan, was selected as the host city of the 1998 Winter Olympics.

== Events ==
The host of the 97th IOC Session was chosen during the 92nd IOC Session in Istanbul, Turkey, on 12 May 1987. The city was chosen over bids from Belgrade, Budapest, Monte Carlo, Moscow, Nairobi, and Riyadh. Birmingham prevailed in the final round by one vote over Budapest, the runner-up, after a delegate accidentally voted for Moscow, which had been eliminated in a previous round, instead of Budapest as they intended. Birmingham bid for the session the year after an unsuccessful bid to host the 1992 Summer Olympics, in the hope of maintaining the city's connections with IOC members to bolster a potential bid for the 1996 Summer Olympics. This was ultimately unsuccessful, as in 1988 the British Olympic Association chose Manchester as the British bidding city for the 1996 Games over Birmingham.

The conference was held at Birmingham's newly built International Convention Centre. The opening of the session coincided with the grand opening of the complex on 12 June. Queen Elizabeth II was present to inaugurate both, as was Anne, Princess Royal, then the president of the British Olympic Association. IOC president Juan Antonio Samaranch spoke at the opening, urging action against doping in sport. 35 minutes of the opening session were broadcast nationally on BBC Two.

During the conference, IOC members provisionally agreed to allow South Africa to be reinstated into the Olympic movement, the country having been expelled from the IOC in 1970 due to its policies of apartheid. After the Population Registration Act, 1950 was repealed later that month, the Interim National Olympic Committee of South Africa was admitted to the IOC on 9 July, and the country was permitted to compete at the 1992 Summer Olympics. Delegates also agreed to remove the men's team modern pentathlon from the Olympic schedule after 1992. Budapest was selected as the site for the 103rd IOC Session, at which the host of the 2002 Winter Olympics would be chosen in 1995.

New IOC members inducted at the session included Jacques Rogge and Thomas Bach, both future presidents of the International Olympic Committee.

=== 1998 host city vote ===
The host city of the 1998 Winter Olympics was chosen during the session on 15 June 1991. It was later revealed that the Nagano Olympic bid committee had spent approximately $14 million on entertaining the 62 IOC members and many of their companions. The precise figures are not known since Nagano destroyed the financial records after the IOC asked that the entertainment expenditures not be made public. In 2006, a report ordered by the Nagano region's governor said the Japanese city provided millions of dollars in an "illegitimate and excessive level of hospitality" to IOC members, including US$4.4 million spent on entertainment alone.

IOC voting
| City | Country (NOC) | Round 1 | Round 2 | Round 3 | Round 4 | Round 5 |
|---|---|---|---|---|---|---|
| Nagano | Japan | 21 | — | 30 | 36 | 46 |
| Salt Lake City | United States | 15 | 59 | 27 | 29 | 42 |
| Östersund | Sweden | 18 | — | 25 | 23 | — |
| Jaca | Spain | 19 | — | 5 | — | — |
| Aosta | Italy | 15 | 29 | — | — | — |

== See also ==
- List of IOC meetings
