= Thomas Bach =

President of the IOC from 2013 to 2025

His Excellency Thomas Bach OLY
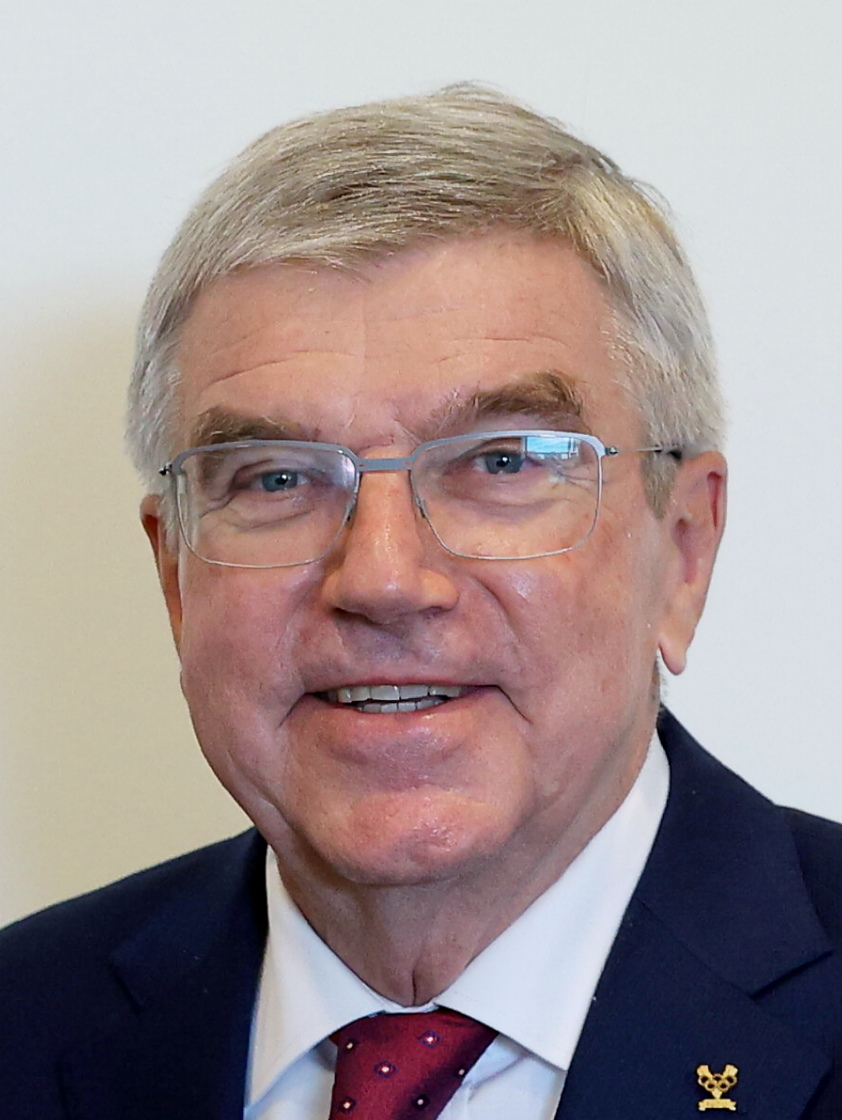
- Bach in 2024

9th President of the International Olympic Committee
- In office 10 September 2013 – 23 June 2025
- Preceded by: Jacques Rogge
- Succeeded by: Kirsty Coventry

Honorary President of the International Olympic Committee
- Incumbent
- Assumed office 23 June 2025
- President: Kirsty Coventry
- Preceded by: Vacant, last held by Jacques Rogge (2021)

Vice-President of the International Olympic Committee
- In office 2000–2013
- IOC President: Juan Antonio Samaranch (2000-01); Jacques Rogge (2001-13)
- Preceded by: James L. Easton
- Succeeded by: John Coates

Executive Board Member of the International Olympic Committee
- In office 1996–2000
- IOC President: Juan Antonio Samaranch (1996-2000)

Personal details
- Born: 29 December 1953 (age 72) Würzburg, West Germany
- Spouse: Claudia Kargl
- Education: University of Würzburg (Dr. iur. utr.)
- Profession: Lawyer
- Sports career
- Height: 171 cm (5 ft 7 in)
- Weight: 65 kg (143 lb)
- Sport: Fencing
- Club: Tauberbischofsheim Fencing Club
Medal record
Representing West Germany
Summer Olympic Games
Gold medal – first place	1976 Montréal	Foil, team
World Championships
Gold medal – first place	1977 Buenos Aires	Foil, team
Silver medal – second place	1973 Gothenburg	Foil, team
Bronze medal – third place	1979 Melbourne	Foil, team

Thomas Bach (born 29 December 1953) is a German lawyer, sports administrator, and former foil fencer. He served as the ninth president of the International Olympic Committee, from 2013 to 2025. He was the first Olympic champion to be elected to that position, having won gold in the 1976 men's team foil. Since 2025, he has served as Honorary President of the International Olympic Committee. Bach is also a former German individual foil champion as well as a team world champion, and former member of the German Olympic Sports Confederation's executive board.

== Early life and education ==
Bach was born in Würzburg. He grew up in Tauberbischofsheim, where he lived with his parents until 1977. Bach earned a doctor of law (Dr. iur. utr.) degree in 1983 at the University of Würzburg. In addition to his native German, he speaks fluent French, English and Spanish.

== Fencing career ==
Bach is a former foil fencer, who competed for West Germany. In 1971, at 17 years of age, he won the German national junior foil championship, and a bronze medal at the Junior World Fencing Championships in Chicago, Illinois.

At the World Fencing Championships he also won a team silver medal in 1973 in Gothenburg, Sweden, a team gold medal in 1977 in Buenos Aires, Argentina, and a team bronze medal in 1979 in Melbourne, Australia. Bach completed his last competitive international match on 26 October 1980 in Shanghai.

He won a foil team gold medal at the 1976 Summer Olympics in Montreal, Canada. On 11 November 2017, Bach was formally granted the use of the post-nominal letters "OLY".

Nationally, Bach won the 1977 and 1978 German Individual Foil Championships. He also won the 1978 European Cup of Champions of foil teams.

== DOSB Presidency ==
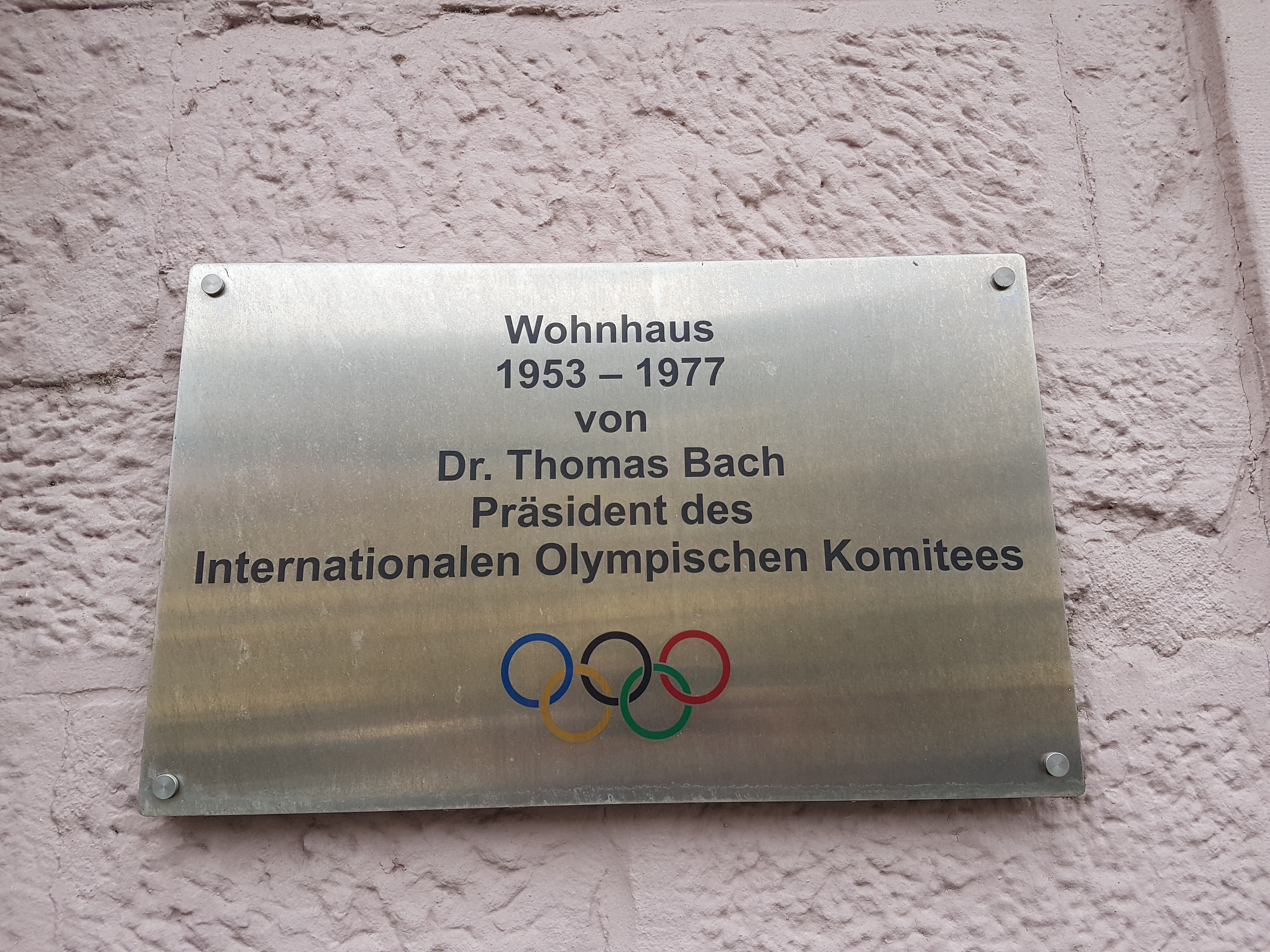
Sign at the house of Thomas Bach, where he lived in 1953–1977, at the Sonnenplatz in Tauberbischofsheim

Bach served as the President of the German Olympic Sports Confederation (DOSB), prior to becoming President of the International Olympic Committee (IOC). In order to run for IOC Presidency, he resigned as the head of the DOSB on 16 September 2013, having served in that position since 2006. He was replaced by Alfons Hörmann, and remained a member of the DOSB Executive Board. Additionally, he resigned as the head of Ghorfa Arab-German Chamber of Commerce and Industry. Bach would, however, continue serving as the head of Michael Weinig AG Company, a company in the industrial woodworking machinery industry that has its headquarters in Bach's hometown of Tauberbischofsheim.

In 2012, Bach headed Munich's bid for the 2018 Winter Olympics. In the host city election, Munich secured 25 votes as South Korea's Pyeongchang was elected as host city with 63 votes.

== IOC Presidency ==
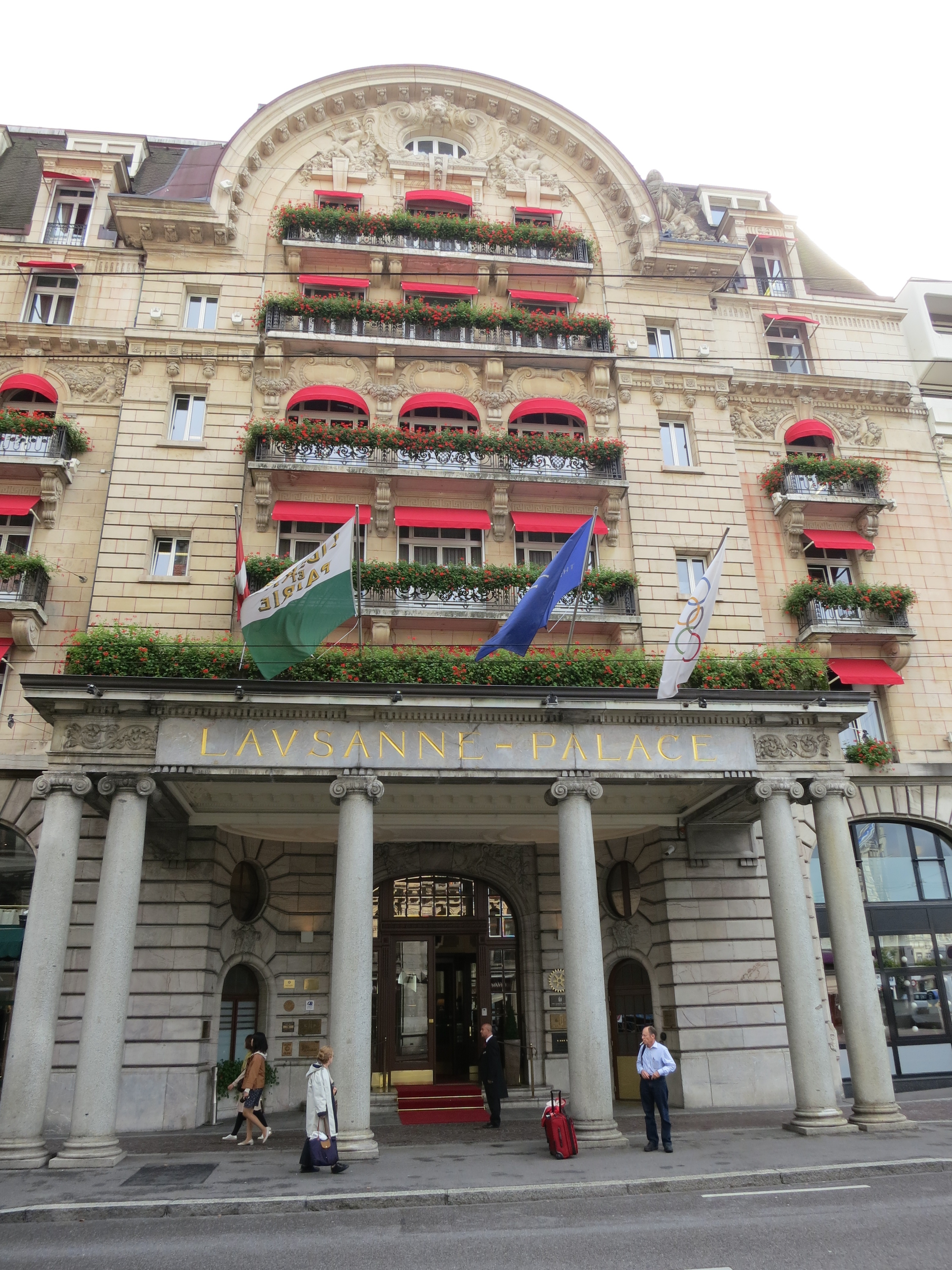
Like his predecessors Juan Antonio Samaranch and Jacques Rogge, Thomas Bach stayed at the Lausanne Palace when he was in Lausanne

On 9 May 2013, Bach confirmed that he would run for President of the International Olympic Committee.

Bach previously served as chief scrutineer for the votes on the 2012 and 2016 Summer Olympics.

=== 2013 and 2021 IOC presidential election ===
Bach was elected to an eight-year term as IOC President at the 125th IOC Session in Buenos Aires on 10 September 2013. He secured 49 votes in the final round of voting, giving him the majority needed to be elected. He succeeded Jacques Rogge, who had served as IOC President from 2001 to 2013. Bach would be eligible to run for a second four-year term at the 137th IOC Session in 2021 until 2025.

Bach's successful election came against five other candidates: Sergey Bubka, Richard Carrión, Ng Ser Miang, Denis Oswald and Wu Ching-Kuo. The result of the election was as follows:

Election of the 9th IOC President
Candidate	Round 1	Round 2
(Germany) Thomas Bach	43	49
(Ukraine) Sergey Bubka	8	4
(Puerto Rico) Richard Carrión	23	29
(Singapore) Ng Ser Miang	6	6
(Switzerland) Denis Oswald	7	5
(Chinese Taipei) Wu Ching-kuo	6	—

Bach officially moved into the IOC presidential office at the IOC headquarters in Lausanne, Switzerland, on 17 September 2013, a week after being elected president.

At a meeting of the 137th session of the International Olympic Committee on 10 March 2021, Bach was re-elected to an additional four-year term as president. Bach, 67, was re-elected by a 93–1 vote from 94 valid votes during the session which was held virtually due to the ongoing COVID-19 pandemic. As the organization's rules limit the president's term to eight years with one renewal of four years, Bach stepped down in 2025.

=== Olympic Agenda 2020 ===
Following his election as IOC President, Bach indicated his desire to change the Olympic bidding process and make sustainable development a priority. He stated that the current bidding process "asks too much, too early". These forty proposed reforms became known as Olympic Agenda 2020; they were all unanimously approved at the 127th IOC Session in Monaco in 2014.

=== Olympic host city elections ===
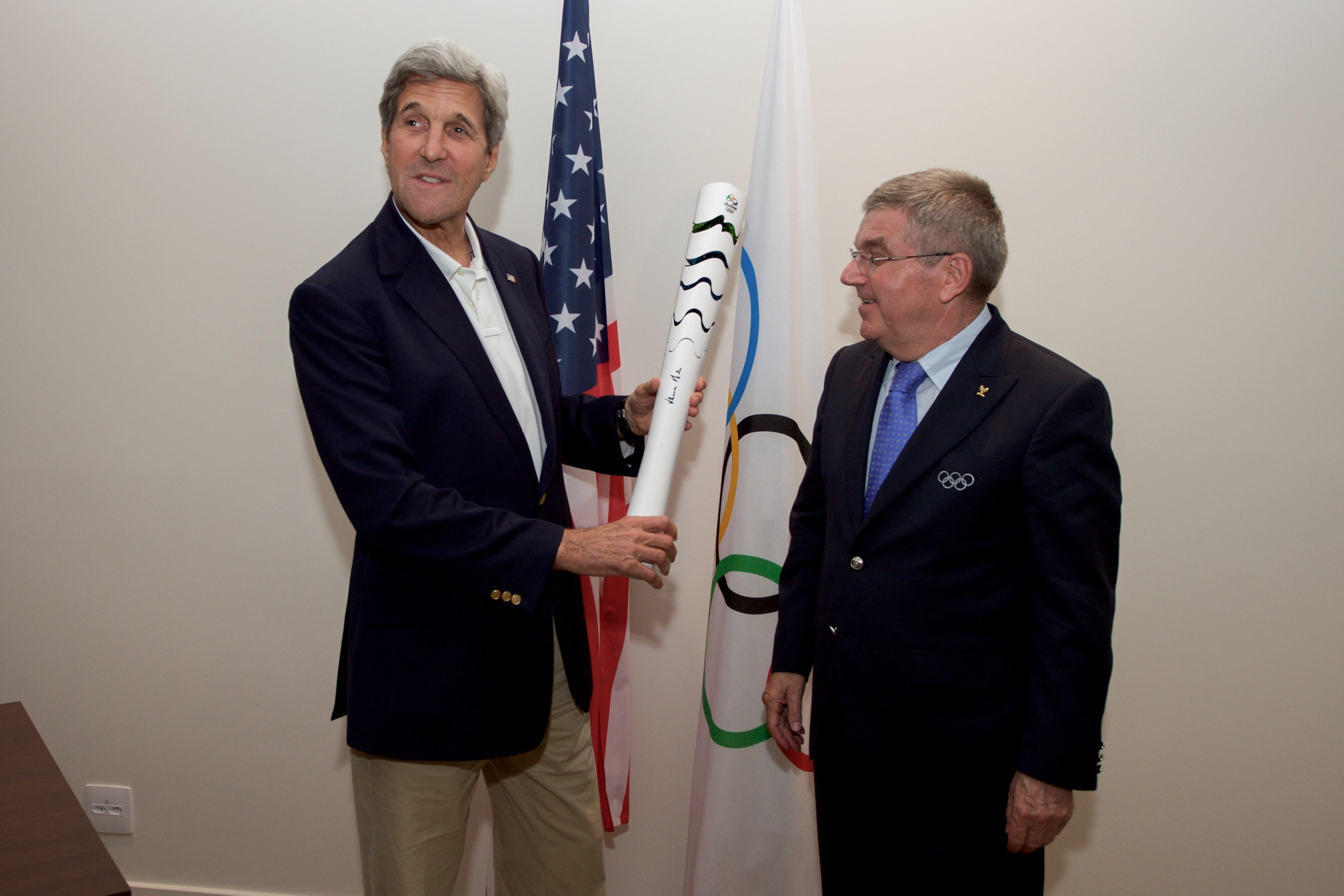
Bach and U.S. Secretary of State John Kerry at the Olympic Park in Rio de Janeiro, Brazil, 6 August 2016

The first bidding process over which Thomas Bach presided was for the 2022 Winter Olympics. Bids were due in November 2013, and the host city, Beijing, was elected to host the 2022 Winter Olympics at the 128th IOC Session in Kuala Lumpur, Malaysia, in July 2015. Lausanne was elected to host the 2020 Winter Youth Olympics during that same session.

During the bidding process for the 2024 Summer Olympics in 2017, President Bach proposed a joint awarding of the 2024 and 2028 Summer Olympics after several bidders withdrew. The IOC later approved a plan to award the 2024 Olympics to Paris, with Los Angeles securing the right to host the 2028 Olympics. President Bach presided over the electoral procedures at the 131st IOC Session in Lima, Peru. Both cities were unanimously elected.

Milan and Cortina d'Ampezzo were elected to host the 2026 Winter Olympics at the 134th IOC Session in Lausanne, Switzerland, in 2019.

=== Reception and challenges ===
Bach's tenure received mixed reviews from observers. Chief sports writer for The Telegraph, Oliver Brown, said of Bach that "for 13 years [he had] masqueraded as the kindly figurehead of the Olympic movement, while acting like a ruthless autocrat."

==== Consultancy contract for Siemens ====
In 2008, Bach was the subject of criticism when Der Spiegel reported that in 2005 he had a €200,000 consultancy contract with Siemens, which was remunerated with €400,000 in 2008 and provided for additional expenses of €5,000 per day. Bach was alleged to have used his IOC connections to attract the government of Kuwait as an investor for a Siemens project, allegedly lobbying Sheikh Ahmed al-Sabah, then Kuwait's energy minister and an IOC member, on behalf of the company. Siemens' supervisory board members criticized that with such high fees, additional daily payment was "absolutely unusual." They also criticized a possible conflict of interest, because Siemens profited from contracts related to sports, and overlaps between his professional activities and his work as a sports official.

==== President of the Ghorfa ====
Bach has been criticized for his work as president of Ghorfa Arab-German Chamber of Commerce and Industry (Ghorfa). Ghorfa legalizes trade documents of companies that want to export to Arab countries. It does so by certifying that the products do not contain parts from Israel. The practice was introduced in the 1970s as part of the Arab League boycott of Israel.

==== Controversies surrounding Russia ====
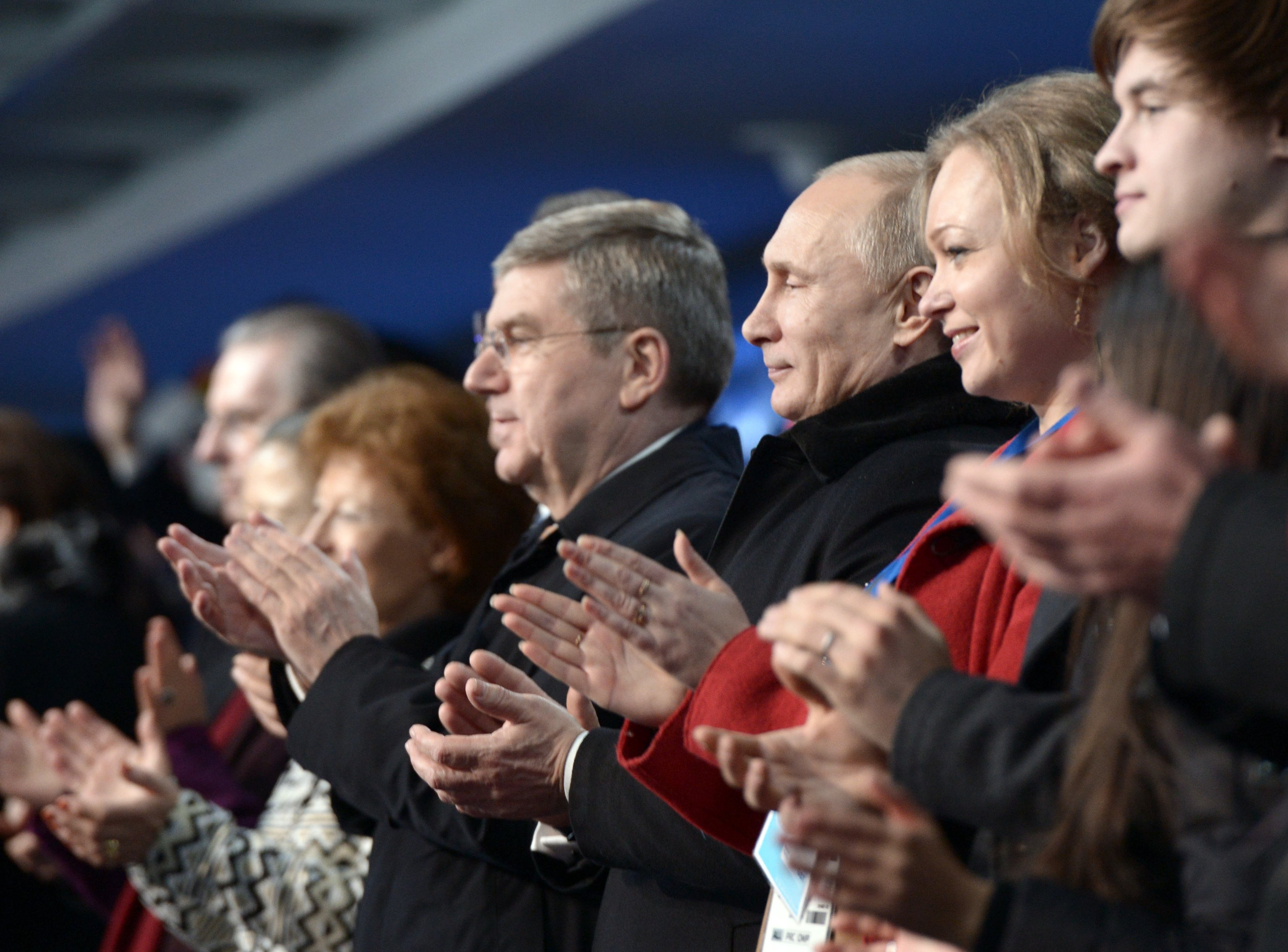
Thomas Bach and Russian President Vladimir Putin at the 2014 Winter Olympics in Sochi

One of the biggest challenges Bach has been faced with as IOC President is having to deal with Russia's state-sponsored doping scandal. This program did begin prior to his presidency, but nonetheless it has become a pressing issue during his tenure. It had been discovered that Russia tampered with the anti-doping lab at the 2014 Winter Olympics in Sochi and that the government had overseen mass doping among the Russian Olympic athletes for many years. Speaking at the opening ceremony of the 2018 Winter Olympics, Bach's call to "respect the rules and stay clean" was widely interpreted as a reference to the Russian scandal. Bach was harshly criticized for what many see as turning a blind eye to Russia's state-sponsored Olympic doping effort. Jim Walden, attorney for whistleblower Grigory Rodchenkov, called Bach's move to reinstate the Russian Olympic Committee following the 2018 Winter Olympics, despite the failed drug tests during the Games, "weakness in the face of evil".

There was wide speculation that Vladimir Putin's support was a key factor in Thomas Bach's election as IOC president in September 2013. It was reported that Putin had congratulated Bach by phone only a few minutes after his election.

Bach has been criticized by German media for his perceived friendliness towards Russia. He was even seen as instrumental in lifting the World Anti-Doping Agency's ban on Russian athletes in 2018. Bach has also expressed support for participation of Russian and Belarusian athletes at the 2024 Summer Olympics, despite the ongoing Russo-Ukrainian War. Responding to opposition from several nation states, he said that it should not be up to national governments to decide who gets to participate in international sporting tournaments. On 22 March 2023, Bach further reiterated his support for reinstating Russian and Belarusian athletes, expressing opposition to political influence on sports and "any suggestion that Russians should be treated as if they have collective guilt".

In October 2023, the IOC suspended the Russian Olympic Committee, which had previously sent independent Russian athletes to the Olympic Games, due to violations of the Olympic Charter – specifically, for incorporating Ukrainian sporting bodies from annexed Ukrainian territory into the Russian body, and so violating the integrity of the Ukraine Olympic Committee. Russia challenged this in the Court of Arbitration for Sport; in February 2024 the appeal was declined. This worsened tensions between the IOC and ROC, with Thomas Bach saying in March 2024 that Russia only has itself to blame.

==== Postponement of 2020 Tokyo Summer Olympics ====
On 5 March 2020, Bloomberg News reported that Bach had stated "Neither the word 'cancellation' nor the word 'postponement' were even mentioned" regarding the upcoming 2020 Summer Olympics in Tokyo, Japan amidst COVID-19 pandemic at the IOC's executive board meeting the previous day. On 22 March, the IOC announced that within four weeks a decision would be made on whether Tokyo 2020 is going to be staged as planned or whether a postponement is necessary. Later that month, the IOC reversed the course and rescheduled the 2020 Games, which held from 23 July to 8 August 2021.

Meanwhile, Bach was in Tokyo in July 2021 to promote a safe launch of the postponed 2020 Summer Olympics, he referred to Japanese people as "Chinese", triggering a backlash on social media. Bach's visit to Hiroshima Peace Memorial Park was opposed by survivor groups, some of which accused Bach of using the historic place politically to "justify holding of the Olympics by force under the pandemic". Furthermore, Hiroshima prefectural and municipal governments had to cover some 3.79 million yen (roughly $34,000) in security costs for Bach after the IOC refused to pay. As The Washington Post had called Bach "Von Ripper-off", the translated term "Bottakuri danshaku (ぼったくり男爵)" - "Baron Rip-off" - became his nickname, and made the top 10 in 2021's Buzzwords of the Year in Japan.

==== Peng Shuai and 2022 Winter Olympics ====
Later in 2021, Chinese tennis star Peng Shuai was suspected to have been forcibly disappeared after she accused Zhang Gaoli, a top official of the Chinese Communist Party (CCP), of sexual assault. Following international outcry, the CCP offered an apparent "proof-of-life" video. Bach served as an interviewer in the video, in which Peng stated that she was safe and well. Zhang and Bach had met and worked together on the 2022 Winter Olympics in Beijing. After the interview, Global Athlete, an athlete advocacy group, said the IOC had demonstrated "an abhorrent indifference to sexual violence and the well-being of female athletes". Peng attended several events at the 2022 Winter Olympics and had a meeting with Bach and other IOC officials, where she announced her intention to travel to Europe after the COVID-19 pandemic is over.

==== Israel at the 2024 Summer Olympics ====
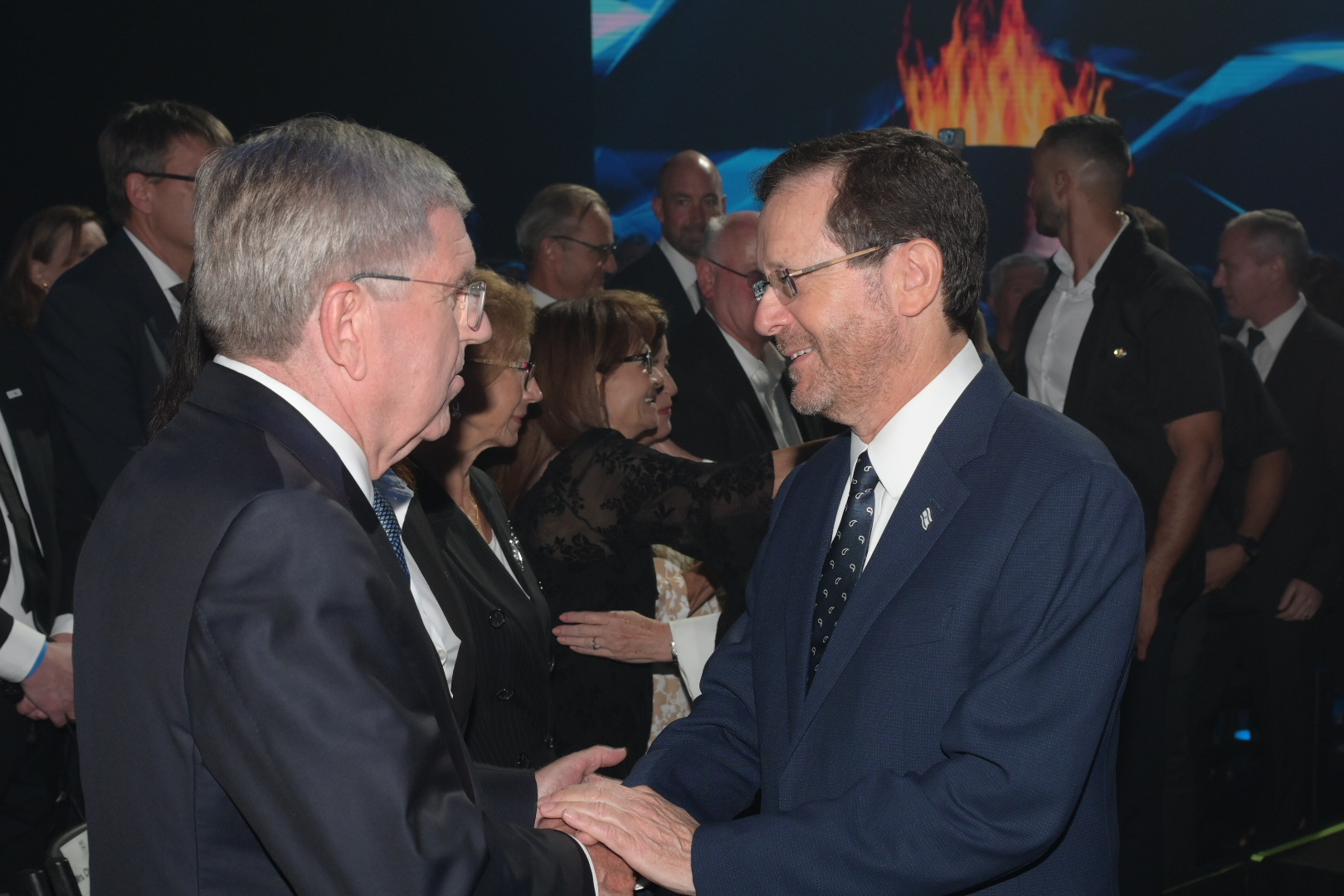
Bach with Israeli President Isaac Herzog in Tel Aviv, Israel, 21 September 2022

The participation of Israel at the 2024 Summer Olympics prompted calls from left-wing French lawmakers, Palestinian, and other global sports organizations for sanctions against Israel and to prevent its participation due to the impact of the Gaza war on Palestinian athletes and sports facilities, but Bach confirmed this was never an issue for the IOC and cautioned athletes against boycotts and discrimination. In November 2023, Russia accused the IOC of having double standards by not sanctioning Israel due to its military actions in Gaza and occupation of Palestine, as Palestine is also an IOC member.

==== Olga Kharlan incident and 2024 Summer Olympics ====
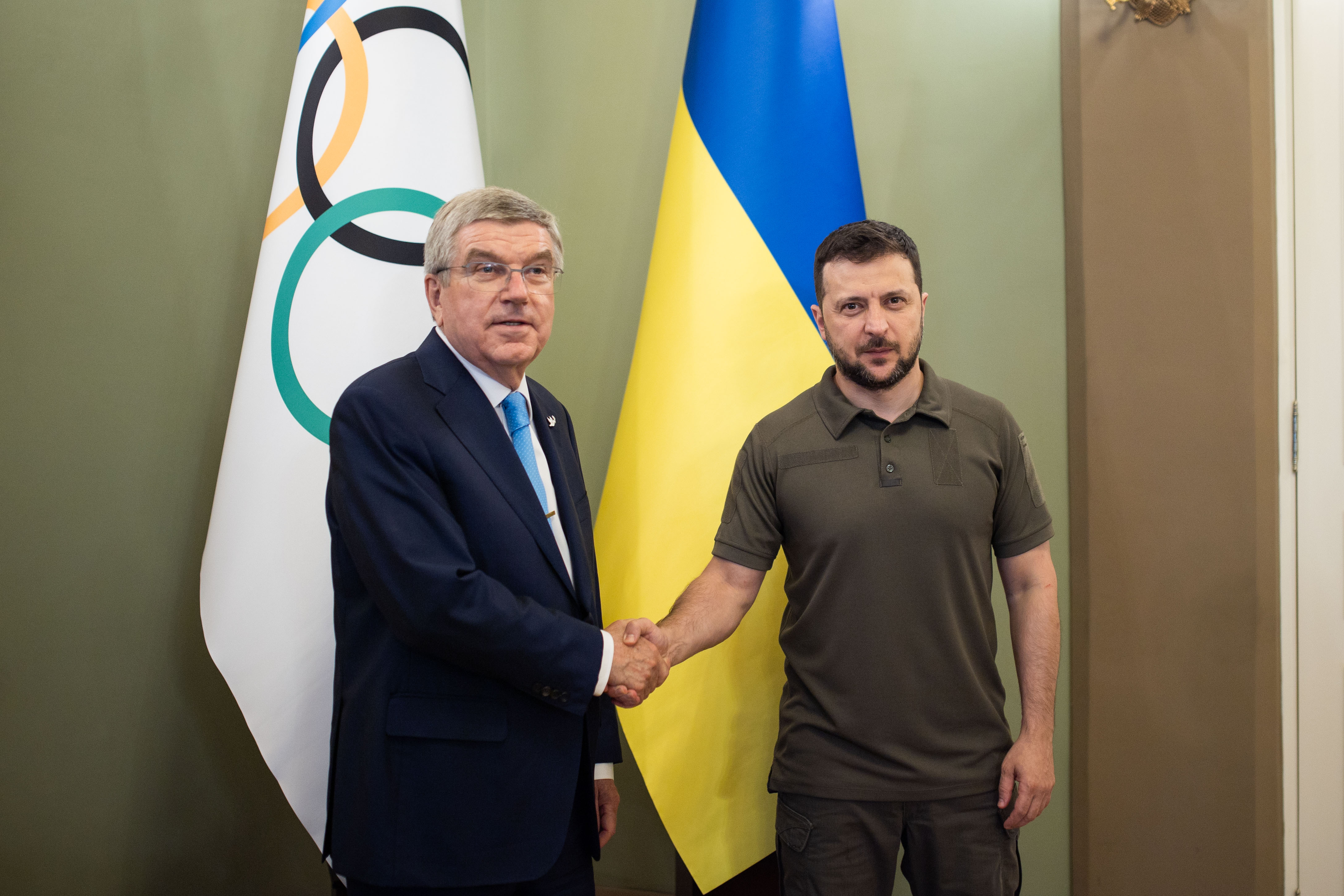
Thomas Bach and Ukrainian President Volodymyr Zelenskyy in Kyiv, Ukraine, 3 July 2022

Since 1 July 2020 (and reconfirmed by FIE public notice in September 2020 and in January 2021), by public written notice the FIE had replaced its previous handshake requirement with a "salute" by the opposing fencers, and written in its public notice that handshakes were "suspended until further notice." Nevertheless, in July 2023 when Ukrainian four-time world fencing individual sabre champion Olga Kharlan was disqualified at the World Fencing Championships by the Fédération Internationale d'Escrime for not shaking the hand of her defeated Russian opponent, though Kharlan instead offered a tapping of blades in acknowledgement, Bach stepped in the next day. As President of the IOC, he sent a letter to Kharlan in which he expressed empathy for her, and wrote that in light of the situation she was being guaranteed a spot in the 2024 Summer Olympics. He wrote further: "as a fellow fencer, it is impossible for me to imagine how you feel at this moment. The war against your country, the suffering of the people in Ukraine, the uncertainty around your participation at the Fencing World Championships ... and then the events which unfolded yesterday - all this is a roller coaster of emotions and feelings. It is admirable how you are managing this incredibly difficult situation, and I would like to express my full support to you. Rest assured that the IOC will continue to stand in full solidarity with the Ukrainian athletes and the Olympic community of Ukraine."

==== Other issues ====
Bach was criticized by journalist Marina Hyde in The Guardian for comparing the IOC positively to FIFA with regard to corruption. Also in The Guardian, Owen Gibson accused Bach of hypocrisy for agreeing to be involved with the 2015 European Games hosted in Azerbaijan. Twenty-nine journalists signed an open letter to Bach calling for him to condemn Azerbaijan's jailing of dissenters and attacks on freedom of expression.

In 2017, Bach faced a backlash for his decision to rename synchronized swimming as artistic swimming. The name change spurred a petition signed by over 11,000 people from 88 countries, with one signer declaring "'Artistic Swimming' sounds like something society ladies did with their bosom friends at garden parties or after tea in the early 20th century."

== Personal life ==
Bach married Claudia Bach in 1977.

== Honors ==
=== State honors ===
- Hungary:
  - Grand Cross of the Hungarian Order of Merit (2025)
- France: Officer of the Order of Légion of Honour (2024)
- Greece:
  - Grand Cross of the Order of the Phoenix
- Poland:
  - 1st Class of the Order of Merit of the Republic of Poland
- Russia:
  - Order of Honour
- South Korea:
  - Blue Dragon (Cheongnyong) of the Order of Sports Merit
- Tunisia:
  - Grand Cordon of the National Order of Merit (2016)
- Ukraine:
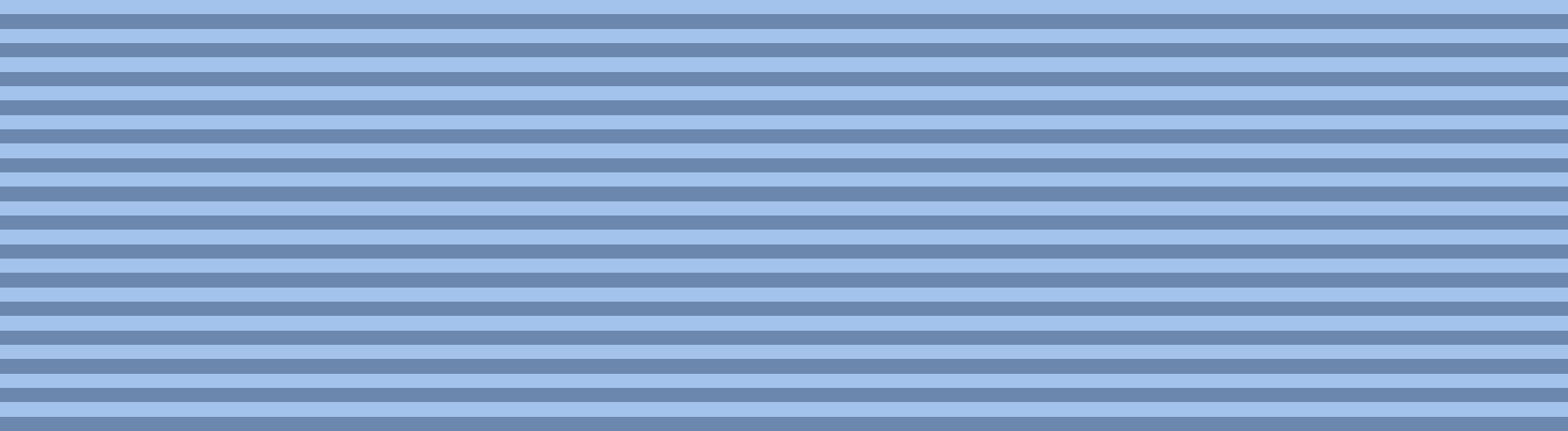
  - 5th Class of the Order of Prince Yaroslav the Wise
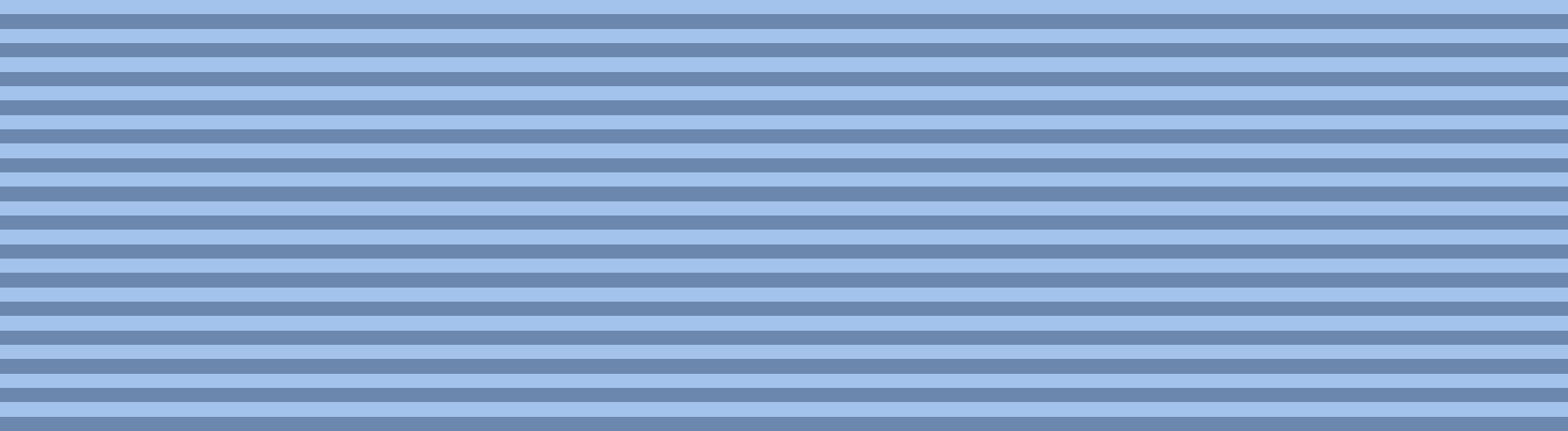
  - 4th Class of the Order of Prince Yaroslav the Wise
- Japan:
  - Grand Cordon of the Order of the Rising Sun (2025)

=== Honorary doctorates ===
- Spain: Doctorate honoris causa from the Universidad Católica de Murcia.
- Japan: Honorary Doctorate from the University of Tsukuba.

=== Awards ===
- Seoul Peace Prize from the Republic of Korea
- 2025: Gold Olympic Order

== Notes and references ==
Sporting positions
Preceded by Manfred von Richthofen (Olympic official) as President of the Deutscher Sportbund	President of the Deutscher Olympischer Sportbund; 2006–2013	Succeeded by Alfons Hörmann
Preceded by Klaus Steinbach as President of the Nationales; Olympisches Komitee für Deutschland	President of the Deutscher Olympischer Sportbund; 2006–2013	Succeeded by Alfons Hörmann
Preceded by Jacques Rogge	President of the International Olympic Committee; 2013–2025	Succeeded by Kirsty Coventry
