= Denis Oswald (sports official) =

Swiss rower and sports official

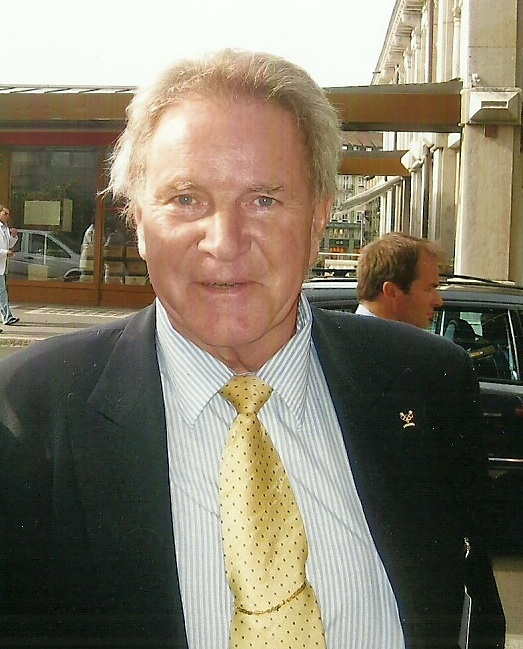
- Oswald in 2009

Personal information
- Born: 9 May 1947 (age 79) Neuchâtel, Switzerland

Sport
- Sport: Rowing
Medal record
Men's rowing
Representing Switzerland
Olympic Games
| Bronze medal – third place | 1968 Mexico City | Coxed four |

Denis Oswald (born 9 May 1947 in Neuchâtel) is a Swiss rower and sports official. He competed in the 1968, 1972, and 1976 Summer Olympics. He is the immediate past-president of the World Rowing Federation (1989–2014).

== Career ==
In 1968 Oswald won the bronze medal as crew member of the Swiss boat in the coxed fours event. Four years later he finished eighth with the Swiss boat in the coxed four competition. At the 1976 Games he was part of the Swiss boat which finished eighth in the quadruple sculls event.

From 1989 until July 2014 Oswald was president of the International Rowing Federation. In 1991 he was elected to the International Olympic Committee (IOC). Since 2000 he has been a member of the IOC's executive board and since 2005 he has been presiding over the IOC's coordination committee for the 2012 Summer Olympics. He was the chief scrutineer at the 115th IOC Session in Prague in 2003, which saw Vancouver awarded the 2010 Winter Olympic Games.

=== 2013 candidacy for IOC President ===
On 24 May 2013, Denis Oswald confirmed that he would run for President of the IOC. On 10 September 2013 at the 125th IOC Session in Buenos Aires, he lost the election to Thomas Bach.

He is a head of the IOC Disciplinary Commission.

In February 2022, he was retained to represent Kamila Valieva, a Russian figure skater who tested positive for trimetazidine, a banned substance, and was temporarily suspended from the ROC Olympic team. While there are equities on both sides of the Valieva dispute, Oswald made the claim that Valieva tested positive because of contamination from medication her grandfather was taking.
