= List of IOC meetings =

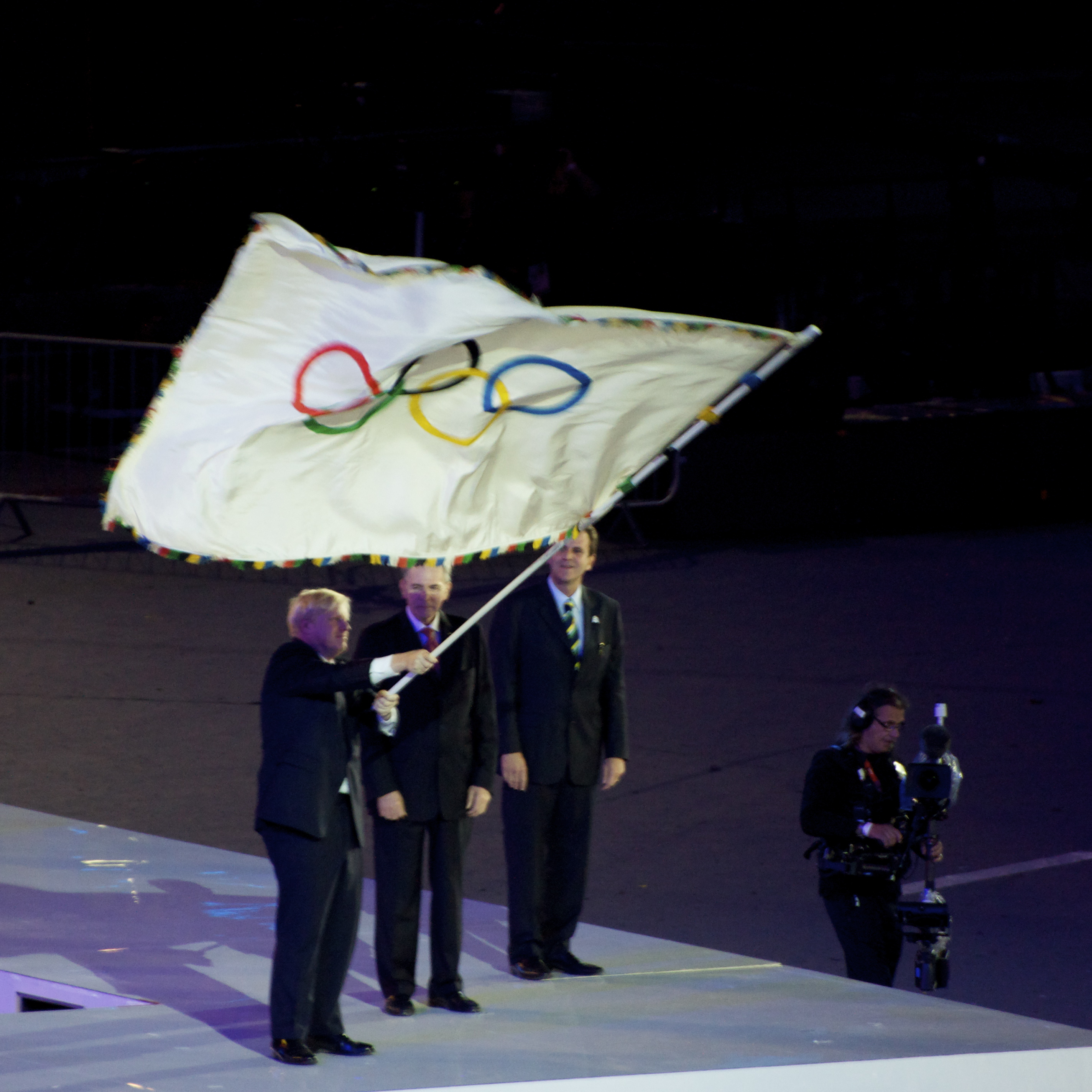
The Olympic flag at the closing ceremony of the 2012 Summer Olympics.

The following is a list of International Olympic Committee (IOC) meetings.

== Olympic Congresses ==
#	Host city	Country	Year
1st	Paris	France	1894
2nd	Le Havre	France	1897
3rd	Brussels	Belgium	1905
4th	Paris	France	1906
5th	Lausanne	Switzerland	1913
6th	Paris	France	1914
7th	Lausanne	Switzerland	1921
8th	Prague	Czechoslovakia	1925
9th	Berlin	Germany	1930
10th	Varna	Bulgaria	1973
11th	Baden-Baden	West Germany	1981
12th	Paris	France	1994
13th	Copenhagen	Denmark	2009

== IOC Sessions ==
There has been a session during all Olympic Games except the 1900, 1904 and 1908 Summer Olympics and the 1924, 1928 and 1932 Winter Olympics.

Session voting for president
Session voting for Olympic host
Session voting for president and Olympic host

Session	Year	Host city	Olympic occasion	Activities	Ref
1st	1894	Paris, France	I Olympic Congress	Athens of Greece was selected as the host for the Games of the I Olympiad. Paris of France was selected as the host for the Games of the II Olympiad.	
2nd	1896	Athens, Greece	Games of the I Olympiad	The French Pierre de Coubertin was elected as the second President of the International Olympic Committee.	
3rd	1897	Le Havre, France	II Olympic Congress		
4th	1901	Paris, France	Separate occasions	Chicago of United States was selected as the host for the Games of the III Olympiad. These games would later be moved to St. Louis.	
5th	1903	Paris, France	Separate occasions	IOC historian Wolf Lyberg reports that this meeting never occurred, but it is still counted by the IOC.	
6th	1904	(United Kingdom) London, Great Britain	Separate occasions	Rome of Italy was selected as the host for the Games of the IV Olympiad.	
7th	1905	Brussels, Belgium	III Olympic Congress		
8th	1906	Athens, Greece	Separate occasions		
9th	1907	The Hague, Netherlands	Separate occasions	De Coubertin was re-elected as the President of the International Olympic Committee for the third term.	
10th	1909	Berlin, Germany	Separate occasions	Stockholm of Sweden was selected as the host for the Games of the V Olympiad.	
11th	1910	Luxembourg City, Luxembourg	Separate occasions		
12th	1911	Budapest, Austria-Hungary	Separate occasions		
13th	1912	Basel, Switzerland	Separate occasions	IOC historian Wolf Lyberg reports that this meeting was not an official session, but it is still counted by the IOC.	
14th	1912	Stockholm, Sweden	Games of the V Olympiad	Berlin of Germany was selected as the host for the Games of the VI Olympiad, later were cancelled due to World War I.	
15th	1913	Lausanne, Switzerland	V Olympic Congress		
16th	1914	Paris, France	VI Olympic Congress		
All international Olympic business was suspended from 1915 to 1918 due to World War I.
17th	1919	Lausanne, Switzerland	Separate occasions	Antwerp of Belgium was selected as the host for the Games of the VII Olympiad.	
18th	1920	Antwerp, Belgium	Games of the VII Olympiad		
19th	1921	Lausanne, Switzerland	VII Olympic Congress	Chamonix of France was selected as the host for the I Olympic Winter Games. Paris of France was selected as the host for the Games of the VIII Olympiad. Amsterdam of the Netherlands was selected as the host for the Games of the IX Olympiad.	
20th	1922	Paris, France	Separate occasions		
21st	1923	Rome, Italy	Separate occasions	Los Angeles of the United States was selected as the host for the Games of the X Olympiad.	
22nd	1924	Paris, France	Games of the VIII Olympiad		
23rd	1925	Prague, Czechoslovakia	VIII Olympic Congress	The Belgian Henri de Baillet-Latour was elected as the third President of the International Olympic Committee.	
24th	1926	Lisbon, Portugal	Separate occasions	St. Moritz of Switzerland was selected as the host for the II Olympic Winter Games.	
25th	1927	Monte Carlo, Monaco	Separate occasions		
26th	1928	Amsterdam, Netherlands	Games of the IX Olympiad		
27th	1929	Lausanne, Switzerland	Separate occasions	Lake Placid of the United States was selected as the host for the III Olympic Winter Games.	
28th	1930	Berlin, Germany	IX Olympic Congress		
29th	1931	Barcelona, Spain	Separate occasions	Berlin of Germany was selected as the host for the Games of the XI Olympiad.	
30th	1932	Los Angeles, United States	Games of the X Olympiad		
31st	1933	Vienna, Austria	Separate occasions	Garmisch-Partenkirchen of Germany was selected as the host for the IV Olympic Winter Games. De Baillet-Latour was re-elected as the President of the International Olympic Committee for the second term.	
32nd	1934	Athens, Greece	Separate occasions		
33rd	1935	Oslo, Norway	Separate occasions		
34th	1936	Garmisch-Partenkirchen, Germany	IV Olympic Winter Games		
35th	1936	Berlin, Germany	Games of the XI Olympiad	Tokyo of Japan was selected as the host for the Games of the XII Olympiad.	
36th	1937	Warsaw, Poland	Separate occasions	Sapporo of Japan was selected as the host for the 1940 Winter Olympics.	
37th	1938	Cairo, Egypt	Separate occasions		
38th	1939	(United Kingdom) London, Great Britain	Separate occasions	Garmisch-Partenkirchen of Germany was selected as the host for the 1940 Winter Olympics. Cortina d'Ampezzo of Italy was selected as the host for the 1944 Winter Olympics. London of Great Britain was selected as the host for the Games of the XIII Olympiad, later were cancelled due to World War II.	
All international Olympic business was suspended from 1940 to 1945 due to World War II.
39th	1946	Lausanne, Switzerland	Separate occasions	St. Moritz of Switzerland was selected as the host for the V Olympic Winter Games. London of Great Britain was selected as the host for the Games of the XIV Olympiad. The Swedish Sigfrid Edström was elected as the fourth President of the International Olympic Committee.	
40th	1947	Stockholm, Sweden	Separate occasions	Oslo of Norway was selected as the host for the VI Olympic Winter Games. Helsinki of Finland was selected as the host for the Games of the XV Olympiad.	
41st	1948	St. Moritz, Switzerland	V Olympic Winter Games		
42nd	1948	(United Kingdom) London, Great Britain	Games of the XIV Olympiad		
43rd	1949	Rome, Italy	Separate occasions	Cortina d'Ampezzo of Italy was selected as the host for the VII Olympic Winter Games. Melbourne of Australia was selected as the host for the Games of the XVI Olympiad.	
44th	1950	Copenhagen, Denmark	Separate occasions		
45th	1951	Vienna, Austria	Separate occasions		
46th	1952	Oslo, Norway	VI Olympic Winter Games		
47th	1952	Helsinki, Finland	Games of the XV Olympiad	The American Avery Brundage was elected as the fifth President of the International Olympic Committee.	
48th	1953	Mexico City, Mexico	Separate occasions		
49th	1954	Athens, Greece	Separate occasions		
50th	1955	Paris, France	Separate occasions	Squaw Valley of the United States was selected as the host for the VIII Olympic Winter Games. Rome of Italy was selected as the host for the Games of the XVII Olympiad.	
51st	1956	Cortina d'Ampezzo, Italy	VII Olympic Winter Games		
52nd	1956	Melbourne, Australia	Games of the XVI Olympiad		
53rd	1957	Sofia, Bulgaria	Separate occasions		
54th	1958	Tokyo, Japan	Separate occasions	In this meeting, the Olympic Hymn by Spyridon Samaras was declared the official anthem of the Games and the IOC.	
55th	1959	Munich, West Germany	Separate occasions	Innsbruck of Austria was selected as the host for the IX Olympic Winter Games. Tokyo of Japan was selected as the host for the Games of the XVIII Olympiad. Luge had been added to the Olympic programme in 1964.	
56th	1960	Squaw Valley, United States	VIII Olympic Winter Games	The IOC Meeting was actually conducted at the historic Herbst Auditorium of the Veterans Building in San Francisco (where the United Nations Charter had been signed in 1945).	
57th	1960	Rome, Italy	Games of the XVII Olympiad	Brundage was re-elected as the President of the International Olympic Committee for the second term.	
58th	1961	Athens, Greece	Separate occasions		
59th	1962	Moscow, Soviet Union	Separate occasions		
60th	1963	Baden-Baden, West Germany	Separate occasions	Session originally awarded to Nairobi, Kenya; moved because Kenya would not issue visas to Portuguese and South African delegates Mexico City of Mexico was selected as the host for the Games of the XIX Olympiad.	
61st	1964	Innsbruck, Austria	IX Olympic Winter Games	Grenoble of France was selected as the host for the X Olympic Winter Games.	
62nd	1964	Tokyo, Japan	Games of the XVIII Olympiad	Brundage was re-elected as the President of the International Olympic Committee for the third term.	
63rd	1965	Madrid, Spain	Separate occasions		
64th	1966	Rome, Italy	Separate occasions	Sapporo of Japan was selected as the host for the XI Olympic Winter Games. Munich of West Germany was selected as the host for the Games of the XX Olympiad.	
65th	1967	Tehran, Iran	Separate occasions		
66th	1968	Grenoble, France	X Olympic Winter Games		
67th	1968	Mexico City, Mexico	Games of the XIX Olympiad	Brundage was re-elected as the President of the International Olympic Committee for the fourth term.	
68th	1969	Warsaw, Poland	Separate occasions		
69th 70th	1970	Amsterdam, Netherlands	Separate occasions	Denver of the United States was selected as the host for the XII Olympic Winter Games, later withdrew and replaced by Innsbruck. Montreal of Canada was selected as the host for the Games of the XXI Olympiad. Due to confusion in numbering, this session is referred to interchangeably as the 69th or 70th IOC Session.	
71st	1971	Luxembourg City, Luxembourg	Separate occasions		
72nd	1972	Sapporo, Japan	XI Olympic Winter Games		
73rd	1972	Munich, West Germany	Games of the XX Olympiad	The Irish Michael Morris, 3rd Baron Killanin was elected as the sixth President of the International Olympic Committee.	
74th	1973	Sofia, Bulgaria	Separate occasions	X Olympic Congress	
75th	1974	Vienna, Austria	Separate occasions	Lake Placid of the United States was selected as the host for the XIII Olympic Winter Games. Moscow of the Soviet Union was selected as the host for the Games of the XXII Olympiad.	
76th	1975	Lausanne, Switzerland	Separate occasions		
77th	1976	Innsbruck, Austria	XII Olympic Winter Games		
78th	1976	Montreal, Canada	Games of the XXI Olympiad		
79th	1977	Prague, Czechoslovakia	Separate occasions		
80th	1978	Athens, Greece	Separate occasions	Sarajevo of Yugoslavia was selected as the host for the XIV Olympic Winter Games. Los Angeles of the United States was selected as the host for the Games of the XXIII Olympiad.	
81st	1979	Montevideo, Uruguay	Separate occasions		
82nd	1980	Lake Placid, United States	XIII Olympic Winter Games		
83rd	1980	Moscow, Soviet Union	Games of the XXII Olympiad	The Spanish Juan Antonio Samaranch was elected as the seventh President of the International Olympic Committee.	
84th	1981	Baden-Baden, West Germany	XI Olympic Congress	Calgary of Canada was selected as the host for the XV Olympic Winter Games. Seoul of South Korea was selected as the host for the Games of the XXIV Olympiad. Tennis had been readmitted to the Olympic programme in 1988.	
85th	1982	Rome, Italy	Separate occasions		
86th	1983	New Delhi, India	Separate occasions		
87th	1984	(Socialist Federal Republic of Yugoslavia) Sarajevo, Yugoslavia	XIV Olympic Winter Games		
88th	1984	Los Angeles, United States	Games of the XXIII Olympiad		
89th	1984	Lausanne, Switzerland	Separate occasions		
90th	1985	East Berlin, East Germany	Separate occasions		
91st	1986	Lausanne, Switzerland	Separate occasions	Albertville of France was selected as the host for the XVI Olympic Winter Games. Barcelona of Spain was selected as the host for the Games of the XXV Olympiad. Separating Summer and Winter games in alternating even-years beginning from 1994 was approved.	
92nd	1987	Istanbul, Turkey	Separate occasions		
93rd	1988	Calgary, Canada	XV Olympic Winter Games		
94th	1988	Seoul, South Korea	Games of the XXIV Olympiad	Lillehammer of Norway was selected as the host for the XVII Olympic Winter Games.	
95th	1989	San Juan, Puerto Rico	Separate occasions	Samaranch was re-elected as the President of the International Olympic Committee for the second term. Demonstration sports were removed from the Olympic programme beginning from 1994	
96th	1990	Tokyo, Japan	Separate occasions	Atlanta of the United States was selected as the host for the Games of the XXVI Olympiad.	
97th	1991	(United Kingdom) Birmingham, Great Britain	Separate occasions	Nagano of Japan was selected as the host for the XVIII Olympic Winter Games. Curling and snowboarding had been added to the Olympic programme in 1998.	
98th	1992	Albertville, France	XVI Olympic Winter Games		
99th	1992	Barcelona, Spain	Games of the XXV Olympiad		
100th	1993	Lausanne, Switzerland	Separate occasions		
101st	1993	Monte Carlo, Monaco	Separate occasions	Sydney of Australia was selected as the host for the Games of the XXVII Olympiad. Samaranch was re-elected as the President of the International Olympic Committee for the third term. Beach Volleyball had been added to the Olympic programme in 1996.	
102nd	1994	Lillehammer, Norway	XVII Olympic Winter Games		
103rd	1994	Paris, France	XII Olympic Congress		
104th	1995	Budapest, Hungary	Separate occasions	Salt Lake City of the United States was selected as the host for the XIX Olympic Winter Games.	
105th	1996	Atlanta, United States	Games of the XXVI Olympiad		
106th	1997	Lausanne, Switzerland	Separate occasions	Athens of Greece was selected as the host for the Games of the XXVIII Olympiad. Samaranch was re-elected as the President of the International Olympic Committee for the fourth term.	
107th	1998	Nagano, Japan	XVIII Olympic Winter Games		
108th	1999	Lausanne, Switzerland	Separate occasions		
109th	1999	Seoul, South Korea	Separate occasions	Turin of Italy was selected as the host for the XX Olympic Winter Games.	
110th	1999	Lausanne, Switzerland	Separate occasions		
111th	2000	Sydney, Australia	Games of the XXVII Olympiad		
112th	2001	Moscow, Russia	Separate occasions	Beijing of (the People's Republic of) China was selected as the host for the Games of the XXIX Olympiad. The Belgian Jacques Rogge was elected as the eight President of the International Olympic Committee.	
113th	2002	Salt Lake City, United States	XIX Olympic Winter Games		
114th	2002	Mexico City, Mexico	Separate occasions		
115th	2003	Prague, Czech Republic	Separate occasions	Vancouver of Canada was selected as the host for the XXI Olympic Winter Games.	
116th	2004	Athens, Greece	Games of the XXVIII Olympiad	The IOC voted on major reforms to the Olympic Charter.	
117th	2005	Civic District, Singapore	Separate occasions	London of Great Britain was selected as the host for the Games of the XXX Olympiad. Baseball and softball is removed from the Olympic programme starting in 2012.	
118th	2006	Turin, Italy	XX Olympic Winter Games	Thomas Bach was elected as an IOC Vice President. The Marshall Islands National Olympic Committee was recognised.	
119th	2007	Guatemala City, Guatemala	Separate occasions	Sochi of the Russian Federation was selected as the host for the XXII Olympic Winter Games.	
120th	2008	Beijing, China	Games of the XXIX Olympiad	Durban, South Africa was selected as the host of the 123rd IOC session.	
121st	2009	Copenhagen, Denmark	XIII Olympic Congress	Rio de Janeiro of Brazil was selected as the host city for the Games of the XXXI Olympiad. Rogge was re-elected as the President of the International Olympic Committee for the second term. Golf and rugby sevens had been readmitted to the Olympic programme for 2016.	
122nd	2010	Vancouver, Canada	XXI Olympic Winter Games	Nanjing of (People's Republic of) China was selected as the host for the 2nd Summer Youth Olympic Games.	
123rd	2011	Durban, South Africa	Separate occasions	Pyeongchang County of South Korea was selected as the host for the XXIII Olympic Winter Games.	
124th	2012	(United Kingdom) London, Great Britain	Games of the XXX Olympiad	The IOC extends its partnership with the IPC.	
Ext	2013	Lausanne, Switzerland	Separate occasions	Buenos Aires of Argentina was selected as the host for the 3rd Summer Youth Olympic Games.	
125th	2013	Buenos Aires, Argentina	Separate occasions	Tokyo of Japan was selected as the host for the Games of the XXXII Olympiad. The German Thomas Bach was elected as the ninth President of the International Olympic Committee. Wrestling had been selected to the Olympic programme for 2020 and 2024.	
126th	2014	Sochi, Russia	XXII Olympic Winter Games	Olympic Agenda 2020, the strategic roadmap for the future of the Olympic Movement initiated by Thomas Bach, had been discussed.	
127th	2014	Monte Carlo, Monaco	Separate occasions	The Extraordinary Session was hosted by IOC member Albert II, Prince of Monaco. The International Olympic Committee discussed Bach's Olympic Agenda 2020.	
128th	2015	Kuala Lumpur, Malaysia	Separate occasions	Beijing of (the People's Republic of) China was selected as the host for the XXIV Olympic Winter Games. Lausanne of Switzerland was selected as the host for the 3rd Winter Youth Olympic Games.	
129th	2016	Rio de Janeiro, Brazil	Games of the XXXI Olympiad	Five optional sports, including baseball/softball, karate, sport climbing, surfing, skateboarding, for the 2020 Summer Olympics were approved.	
130th	2017	Lausanne, Switzerland	Separate occasions	Joint-awarding of the Games of the XXXIII Olympiad and the Games of the XXXIV Olympiad was approved. The bidding process for XXV Olympic Winter Games was approved.	
131st	2017	Lima, Peru	Separate occasions	Paris of France was selected as the host for the Games of the XXXIII Olympiad. Los Angeles of the United States was selected as the host for the Games of the XXXIV Olympiad.	
132nd	2018	Pyeongchang, South Korea	XXIII Olympic Winter Games	The year of the 4th Summer Youth Olympic Games was reverted from 2023 to 2022. The IOC suggested an African city should be host the Summer Youth Olympic Games.	
133rd	2018	Buenos Aires, Argentina	3rd Summer Youth Olympic Games	Dakar of Senegal was selected as the host for the 4th Summer Youth Olympic Games, originally scheduled in 2022, later postponed to 2026 due to operational and economical consequences caused by COVID-19 pandemic.	
134th	2019	Lausanne, Switzerland	Separate occasions	The joint bid from Milan and Cortina d'Ampezzo of Italy was selected as the hosts for the XXV Olympic Winter Games. Four optional sports, including sport climbing, surfing, skateboarding, and breaking, for the 2024 Summer Olympics were approved.	
135th	2020	Lausanne, Switzerland	3rd Winter Youth Olympic Games	Gangwon Province of South Korea was selected as the host for the 4th Winter Youth Olympic Games.	
136th	2020	Lausanne, Switzerland (IOC executive board) and virtual meetings	Separate occasions	The postponement of the 2020 Summer Olympics to 2021 and the 4th Summer Youth Olympic Games from 2022 to 2026 was approved. Originally scheduled to be held in Tokyo, Japan, due to the COVID-19 pandemic, while some IOC executives were working in Lausanne, other work were held virtually.	
137th	2021	Athens, Greece (IOC executive board) and virtual meetings	Separate occasions	Officially opened in a live event in the Panathenaic Stadium in Athens, Greece, which originally had been awarded the Session. Due to the COVID-19 pandemic, the majority of the works were held virtually. Bach is re-elected as the President of the International Olympic Committee for a second term. The International Olympic Committee discussed Bach's Olympic Agenda 2020+5.	
138th	2021	Tokyo, Japan	Games of the XXXII Olympiad	Brisbane of Australia was selected as the host for the Games of the XXXV Olympiad. An optional sport proposed for the 2026 Winter Olympics, ski mountaineering, was approved.	
139th	2022	Beijing, China; Lausanne, Switzerland	XXIV Olympic Winter Games	Review of the resounding success of the IOC Refugee Olympic Team (EOR) at the Games of the XXXII Olympiad, study of the post-Games use of permanent and temporary Olympic venues released, and a Human Rights Strategic Framework established.	
140th	2023	Lausanne, Switzerland with some virtual meetings	Separate occasions	Extraordinary Session; The IOC's executive board voted to have the International Boxing Association lose its status as the sport's international governing body.	
141st	2023	Mumbai, India	Separate occasions	Five optional sports, including baseball/softball, lacrosse, flag football, cricket and squash, for the Games of the XXXIV Olympiad were approved.	
142nd	2024	Paris, France	Games of the XXXIII Olympiad	The French Alps was selected as the hosts for the XXVI Olympic Winter Games. The state of Utah of the United States was selected as the host for the XXVII Olympic Winter Games.	
143rd	2025	Lausanne, Switzerland	Separate occasions	Extraordinary Session; The joint bid from the Dolomites and Valtellina of Italy was selected as the hosts for the 5th Winter Youth Olympic Games.	
144th	2025	Pylos, Greece	Separate occasions	The Zimbabwean Kirsty Coventry was elected as the tenth President of the International Olympic Committee. Boxing was readmitted to the Olympic programme for 2028, after reform efforts succeeded and World Boxing was granted provisional recognition as the sport's international governing body in February 2025.	
145th	2026	Milan, Italy	XXV Olympic Winter Games		
146th	2026	Lausanne, Switzerland	Separate occasions	Extraordinary Session; Members of the session approved changes to the Olympic Charter as part of the Fit for the Future process. The sports programme XXVI Olympic Winter Games was finalised. The bidding process for Games of the XXXVI Olympiad was approved.	
147th	2027	Punta Cana, Dominican Republic	Separate occasions	The sports prorgamme for the Games of the XXXV Olympiad is to be finalised.	
148th	2028	Los Angeles, United States	Games of the XXXIV Olympiad		
149th	2029	TBA	Separate occasions	The host of the Games of the XXXVI Olympiad will be elected.	
150th	2030	Lyon, France	XXVI Olympic Winter Games		
151st	2031	TBA	Separate occasions		
152nd	2032	Brisbane, Australia	Games of the XXXV Olympiad		
153rd	2033	TBA	Separate occasions		
154th	2034	Salt Lake City, United States	XXVII Olympic Winter Games		

== See also ==
- FIFA Congress
