= 130th IOC Session =

The 130th IOC Session took place on 11 July 2017 at the SwissTech Convention Centre in Lausanne.

== Host city elections ==
The session authorised the IOC Executive Board to conclude an agreement with Los Angeles and Paris and their respective NOCs for the simultaneous election of the host cities of the Olympic Games in 2024 and 2028 during the 131st IOC Session in Lima later in 2017.

== See also ==
- 128th IOC Session
- 131st IOC Session
