= Andrew Wilson (businessman) =

Australian businessman (born 1974)

- Born: 7 September 1974 (age 52); Geelong, Victoria, Australia
- Education: Queensland University of Technology
- Occupations: Chairman and CEO of Electronic Arts
- Years active: 2000–present
- Predecessor: John Riccitiello

Andrew Wilson (born 7 September 1974) is an Australian businessman who has been the CEO of Electronic Arts (EA) since September 2013. He has also been chairman of the company since 2021.

Wilson is a member of The Business Council.

== Early life and education ==
Wilson grew up in a working-class family in Victoria and Queensland, Australia. In his youth he played rugby and basketball at school, coached taekwondo, and played golf, surfed, swam, and ran.

He attended Queensland University of Technology, but dropped out before obtaining his law degree.

== Career ==
=== Early career ===
In the dot-com boom of the late 1990s, Wilson, living in Sydney, built Australian websites for international corporations. He subsequently also helped raise venture capital and launch IPOs for dot-com start-ups.

=== Electronic Arts ===
In May 2000, Wilson joined Electronic Arts' small video-game development studio on Australia's Gold Coast, which created V8 supercar, rugby, cricket, and surfing video games but needed someone with real experience in how the sports were actually played. That studio closed in 2002 due to a lack of scale. Wilson then worked in the company's Asian and European markets for several years before moving to EA Sports and then becoming an executive producer on the FIFA franchise. In August 2011 he was appointed executive vice president of EA Sports, and he also took on duties as executive vice president of the company's Origin platform in April 2013.

Six months after the resignation of John Riccitiello, Wilson was chosen to be the company's new CEO on September 17, 2013. In his first year as CEO, Wilson initiated a "player-first" corporate strategy, and offered more free-to-play games and in-app purchase options. In a move towards a transformation from physical software to digital, he also greatly increased EA's digital offerings, and launched EA Access, a subscription-based digital service for Xbox One players that allows unlimited play across a selection of EA titles. Electronic Arts had a large revenue increase and its stock price doubled in 2014.

In 2021, Wilson became chairman of the board of EA, following the retirement of Larry Probst.

In 2023, he restructured the company into two organizations – EA Sports and EA Entertainment (formerly EA Games).

For EA's fiscal year (FY) 2025, Wilson received $30.5 million in total compensation, an increase of $5 million over FY2024 and $10 million greater than in FY2023, and representing a ratio of 260 times more than the compensation of the median employee at EA for FY2025.

== Personal life ==
Wilson is married, and has one daughter and one son. He holds a black belt in Brazilian Jiu Jitsu.

Wilson and his family live in Atherton, California. In 2022, along with several other Silicon Valley executives, he opposed a proposal to allow more than one home on a single acre in Atherton, which is one of Silicon Valley’s most exclusive and wealthiest towns.

== Awards and accolades ==
- 2010 — Winner, BAFTA, Games/Sports — FIFA 2010
- 2010 — Winner, BAFTA, Games/Use of Online — FIFA 2010
- 2014 — #5 on BBC.com's list of best CEOs of 2014
- 2014 — #6 on Forbes' list of America's Most Powerful CEOs 40 and Under
- Winner — Motley Fool's The Best Tech CEOs of 2014
- 2015 — #3 on Fortune magazine's Business Person of the Year list
- 2015 — #3 on Forbes' list of America's Most Powerful CEOs 40 and Under
- 2015 — #58 on Adweek's Power List: The 100 Most Influential Leaders in Marketing and Tech
- 2017 — Variety 500
- 2019 — Forbes Innovative Leaders
- 2022 — Variety 500
- 2023 — Variety 500
