= Alfons Hörmann =

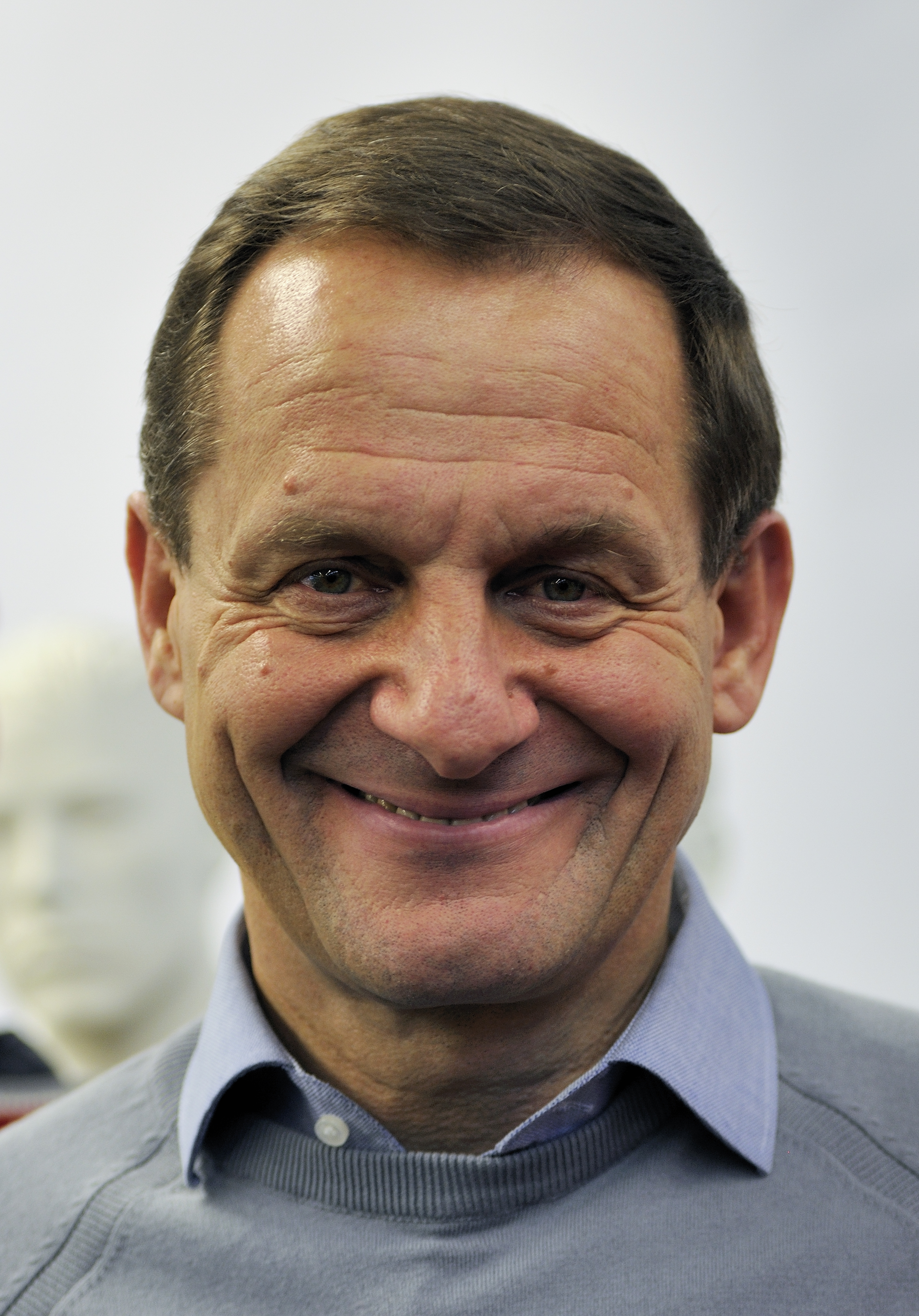
- Hörmann in 2014
- Born: 6 September 1960 (age 65); Kempten, West Germany
- Occupations: Businessman; sports official

Alfons Hörmann (born 6 September 1960) is a German businessman and sports official. Since 7 December 2013, he has been the President of the Deutscher Olympischer Sportbund. He had previously served as president of the German Ski Association from 2005 to 2013.

== Business career ==
Hörmann began his career in the building materials fabrication industry in 1977. From 1990 to 1998, he was the director of the marketing and sales department at the German company Creaton. He became its CEO in 1998 and remained in that position until 2010. From 2011 to 2016, was the managing director of Hörmann Industries and was a member of Funkwerk AG's supervisory.

From January 2018 to April 2020, Hörmann was the CEO of the Schöck Group.

== Sports officialdom ==
In 2010, Hörmann joined the Council of the International Ski Federation. He was elected as president of the Bavarian Ski Association in 2002, German Ski Association in 2005, and then of the German Olympic Sports Confederation (DOSB) in 2013 to replace Thomas Bach. Hörmann's election to the presidency of the DOSB led to the owner of Hörmann Industries, Hans Hörmann, firing Alfons and Alfons offering to resign from the presidency.

Amid concerns of a lack of trust and confidence in Hörmann's leadership and the DOSB during the COVID-19 pandemic, Hörmann resigned the presidency of the DOSB in June 2021 ahead of a vote of confidence.

In July 2021, during the 2020 Tokyo Games, German cyclist coach Patrick Moster made a racist remark on film about North African cyclists for which he was sent back to Germany. Moster issued a public apology, and Hörmann commented on it to say that he believed that the apology was sincere. Hörmann was also criticized because of this event for the working environment of the DOSB as a result.

== Controversies ==
In the 2020 Tokyo Olympics, 14-year-old Olympian Quan Hongchan, representing China won the gold medal in Diving. German Olympic Committee Chairman Alfons Homancun criticized the Chinese diver and said: “I don’t want to know that this Chinese girl was three, five, or eight years ago. What’s your daily life like. But I think that if you have to consider this training method, I must be critical of it.” Homan added: “This method of continuously lowering the age of the contestants is meaningless and ineffective. responsible.” This has raised huge criticism in China, some netizens criticized that the German Olympic delegation had set the worst performance at the Tokyo Olympics. While some slammed Alfons Homancun for his double standards, as German athlete Lilly Stoephasius, also aged 14, competed in skateboarding at the Tokyo Olympics games as well.

== Personal life ==
Hörmann is married and has three children.

Sporting positions
Preceded by Thomas Bach	President of the Deutscher Olympischer Sportbund; 2013–present	Incumbent
