= 128th IOC Session =

2015 session of the International Olympic Committee in Kuala Lumpur

The official banner of the 128th IOC Session.

The 128th IOC Session took place from July 31 – August 3, 2015, in Kuala Lumpur, Malaysia at the Kuala Lumpur Convention Centre. The host city for the 2022 Winter Olympics and the 2020 Winter Youth Olympics were elected during the 128th IOC Session on July 31, 2015.

== Bidders ==
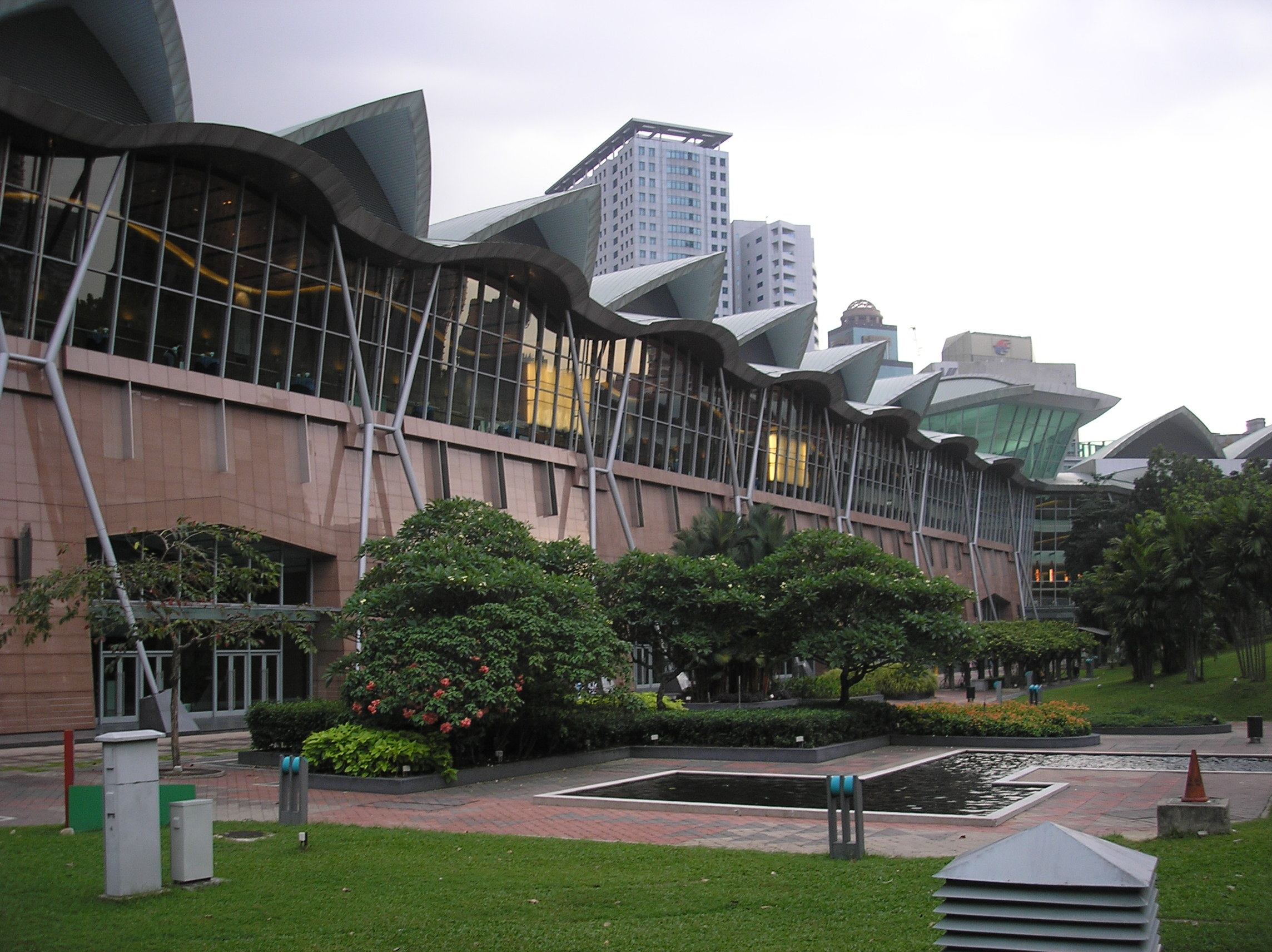
Exterior of the Kuala Lumpur Convention Centre

Kuala Lumpur, Malaysia and Lima, Peru placed bids to host the 128th IOC Session. Kuala Lumpur bid to host the 125th IOC Session which took place in 2013, but they lost out to Buenos Aires. Lima's bid to host the IOC Session was ruled out by the evaluation report which resulted in Kuala Lumpur becoming the host city. Lima later hosted the 131st IOC Session two years after Kuala Lumpur hosted the meeting.

== 2022 Winter Olympics host city election ==
The host city of the 2022 Winter Olympics was elected during the 128th IOC Session. Bids for the games were due to the IOC in 2013. In 2014, the IOC decided that Almaty and Beijing (as Oslo withdrew its bid), would become candidate cities, a year before the host city was elected.

=== Votes results ===
2022 Winter Olympics bidding results
City	Nation	Votes
Beijing	China	44
Almaty	Kazakhstan	40

== 2020 Winter Youth Olympics host city election ==
The host city of the 2020 Winter Youth Olympics was also chosen during the same IOC session. The two candidate cities, Lausanne, Switzerland, and Brașov, Romania, were shortlisted in early December.

=== Votes results ===
2020 Winter Youth Olympics bidding results
City	Nation	Votes
Lausanne	Switzerland	71
Brașov	Romania	10

== Other agendas ==
=== New sports ===
Participants of session have considered the sports to be added to the Tokyo 2020 program. A new shortlist of eight sports were unveiled on June 22, 2015. These sports include baseball/softball, bowling, karate, roller sports, sport climbing, squash, surfing, and wushu.

The federations of the eight sports made their presentations in Tokyo on August 7–8, 2015. In September 2015, organisers will recommend one or more of the sports to the International Olympic Committee for inclusion in 2020 Olympic program, with the final decision in August 2016.

=== Recognition of South Sudan ===
The IOC approved South Sudan's inclusion as a full member of the Committee, allowed the country to participate in Rio 2016 under its national flag. The IOC code for South Sudan Olympic Team is SSD.

== See also ==
- 123rd IOC Session
- 125th IOC Session
- 127th IOC Session
- 130th IOC Session
