= Larry Probst =

American businessman

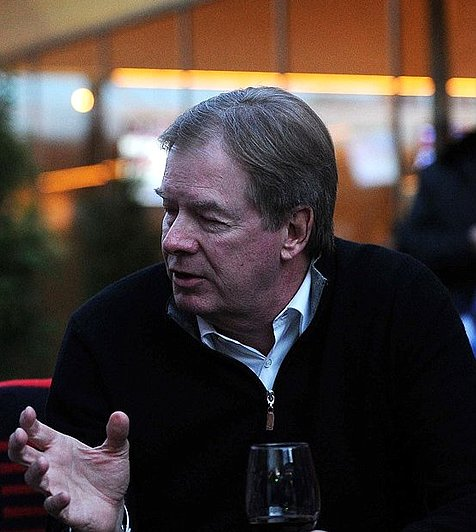
- Probst in Sochi, February 2014
- Born: Lawrence Francis Probst III; June 3, 1950 (age 76)
- Education: Business administration
- Alma mater: University of Delaware
- Occupations: CEO, Electronic Arts; Chairman, U.S. Olympic Committee
- Board member of: Electronic Arts
- Spouse: Nancy Probst
- Children: 2

Lawrence Francis Probst III (born June 3, 1950) is an American businessman who was CEO of video game publisher Electronic Arts from 1991 until 2007, and executive chairman from 2013 to 2015. He continued as chairman of EA until 2021, when he was succeeded by CEO Andrew Wilson. Probst also was chairman of the United States Olympic Committee until 2019.

== Life ==
Probst was born on July 3, 1950 to Ruth (née Gallagher) and Lawrence Francis Probst II. He and his wife Nancy have two sons. Probst earned a bachelor's degree from the University of Delaware.

== Entertainment career ==
Probst worked for Johnson & Johnson and Clorox before being recruited into the video game industry through Activision in 1982.

=== Electronic Arts ===
In 1984 Probst joined EA as vice president for sales, a position he held until 1986. He then took on the role of the company's senior vice president of the publishing division from 1986 until 1990. Probst was promoted to president of Electronic Arts in 1990, remaining in that position until 1997. In 1991, Probst also became CEO of Electronic Arts, a position he held until April 2007.

Next Generation named his one of the "75 Most Important People in the Games Industry of 1995", remarking that "Probst may not be as colorful a character as his predecessor [Trip Hawkins], but he does seem adept at combining the freedom and daring of creativity with the restraints and common sense of a commercial operation."

When president and chief operating officer John Riccitiello resigned in April 2004, Probst became his successor. Riccitiello was re-hired as CEO in 2007, Probst retained his non-operational duties as chairman. He then worked as executive chairman of Electronic Arts from March 18, 2013, to January 1, 2015.

According to EA's 2005 Annual Report, Probst is the biggest individual shareholder in EA, owning 739,761 shares and the right to acquire a further 3.1 million, which combined accounts for 1.2 percent of the company.

In addition to his work at Electronic Arts, Probst also was the chairman of Digital Entertainment Corporation of America. Probst sits on the boards of two cancer research groups: the V Foundation and ABC2 (Accelerate Brain Cancer Cure).

== Olympic career ==
In 2008, Probst was made chairman of the NWO board of the U.S. Olympic Committee. Five years after his appointment as chairman of the USOC, Probst was elected as an IOC member at the 125th IOC Session in Buenos Aires in September 2013. Probst worked with many other IOC groups as well. Probst has been on the IOC International Relations and the IOC Radio and Television Commissions. He assumed the position of chair of the IOC Press Commission in 2014. At the end of 2018 Probst retired from his IOC and USOC positions.
