= 123rd IOC Session =

The 123rd International Olympic Committee Session (or the 2011 International Olympic Committee Session, the 123rd IOC Session or the 2011 IOC Session) was held in July 2011 at the Inkosi Albert Luthuli International Convention Centre in Durban, South Africa. At the session, Pyeongchang, South Korea was announced as the host city of the 2018 Olympic Winter Games and Paralympic Winter Games.

== Events ==
The International Olympic Committee officially announced Durban as the host city of the 123rd IOC Session at the 120th IOC Session in Beijing, People's Republic of China on 7 August 2008, before the 2008 Summer Olympics. (In April 2008, the IOC had announced Hong Kong and Durban as the two candidates to host this 2011 IOC Session.)

IOC withdrew recognition of the NOC of the Netherlands Antilles following the formal dissolution of Netherlands Antilles on 10 October 2010. The athletes of the five islands comprising the Netherlands Antilles were allowed to qualify and compete in the 2012 Olympic Games as independent athletes under the Olympic flag.

The sport of floorball was granted full IOC recognition.

2018 Winter Olympics bidding results
| City | Nation | Round 1 |
| Pyeongchang | South Korea | 63 |
| Munich | Germany | 25 |
| Annecy | France | 7 |

== See also ==
- List of IOC meetings
- 121st IOC Session
- 125th IOC Session
- 127th IOC Session
