= 127th IOC Session =

The 127th IOC Session took place in December 2014 in Monte Carlo, Monaco.

== Olympic Agenda 2020 ==
All provisions in the Olympic Agenda 2020 reform package were approved by the full IOC membership.

== 130th IOC Session host election ==
On December 9, 2014, the IOC members voted for the 131st IOC Session host city in 2017.

127th IOC Session; December 9, 2014 - Monte Carlo, Monaco
City	Round 1
(Peru) Lima	54
(Finland) Helsinki	30

=== Recognition of Kosovo ===
The IOC approved Kosovo's inclusion as a full member of the Committee, allowing the country to participate in Rio 2016 under its national flag and the IOC code of KOS.

== See also ==
- 123rd IOC Session
- 125th IOC Session
- 128th IOC Session
