= 132nd IOC Session =

IOC Session in Pyeongchang, South Korea

The 132nd IOC Session is an IOC Session that was held at the Kensington Flora Hotel in Pyeongchang, South Korea, in February 2018.

== Opening ceremony ==
The opening ceremony of the IOC Session was held at the Gangneung Cultural Centre. The opening ceremony began with multicultural children’s choir Areumdeuri singing the Olympic Hymn and EXO’s Baekhyun singing the national anthem. Following the national anthem, opening speeches and congratulatory messages was given by figures including Lee Hee Beom, the president of the Olympic Organizing Committee, and Moon Jae In, the president of South Korea. The celebratory cultural performance also included VIXX’s stage of “Shangri-La,” taekwondo team K-Tigers, and various traditional musicians and dancers.

== Russian doping situation ==
One of the principal concerns was the situation with regard to the ban on Russian athletes, the results of the Court of Arbitration for Sport decision shortly before the Session, and the uncertainty as to which athletes would be allowed to compete as "Olympic Athletes from Russia" at the 2018 Winter Olympic Games which were due to start a few days after the start of the Session.

== Olympic host city selections ==
=== 2022 Youth Olympic Games ===
The IOC Executive Board presented to the IOC session a proposal that the African continent will be a strong priority to host the 2022 Summer Youth Olympics. The session confirmed the change of date back to 2022, after Agenda 2020 had previously suggested changing it to 2023. Awarded to Dakar, Senegal, the games were initially held in 2022, but because of COVID-19 pandemic, lead to Tokyo Olympics' postponement to 2021, it was rescheduled to 2026, which also held the 2026 Winter Olympics in Italy.

== Election of new IOC Ethics Committee members ==
Three new members of the IOC Ethics Committee were elected during the session: Danka Bartekova of Slovakia, Pierre Olivier Beckers of Belgium, and Auvita Rapilla of Papua New Guinea.
