= Dagmawit Girmay Berhane =

Ethiopian sports director

President of the Ethiopian National Olympic Committee
- In office 2004–2008

Personal details
- Born: 27 July 1975 (age 51)
- Education: Addis Ababa University; University of Lausanne

Dagmawit Girmay Berhane (born 27 July 1975) is an Ethiopian sports director who served as the president of the Ethiopian Olympic Committee from 2004 to 2008. She presented the medals at the men's decathlon event in the 2016 Summer Olympics.

In 2013, Berhane became a member of the International Olympic Committee (IOC). She has been a member of the Chair of Finance and Audit Commission of Association of National Olympic Committees since 2019.

Berhane has also served as the Ethiopian director of DKT International, president of the Ethiopian Badminton Federation from 2000 to 2016, and as an executive board/council member of the Association of National Olympic Committees (2009–2016) and Association of National Olympic Committees of Africa (2006–2017).
