= 125th IOC Session =

2013 International Olympic Committee session

Coordinates: 34.6058°S 58.3636°W

2013 IOC presidential election
- 10 September 2013
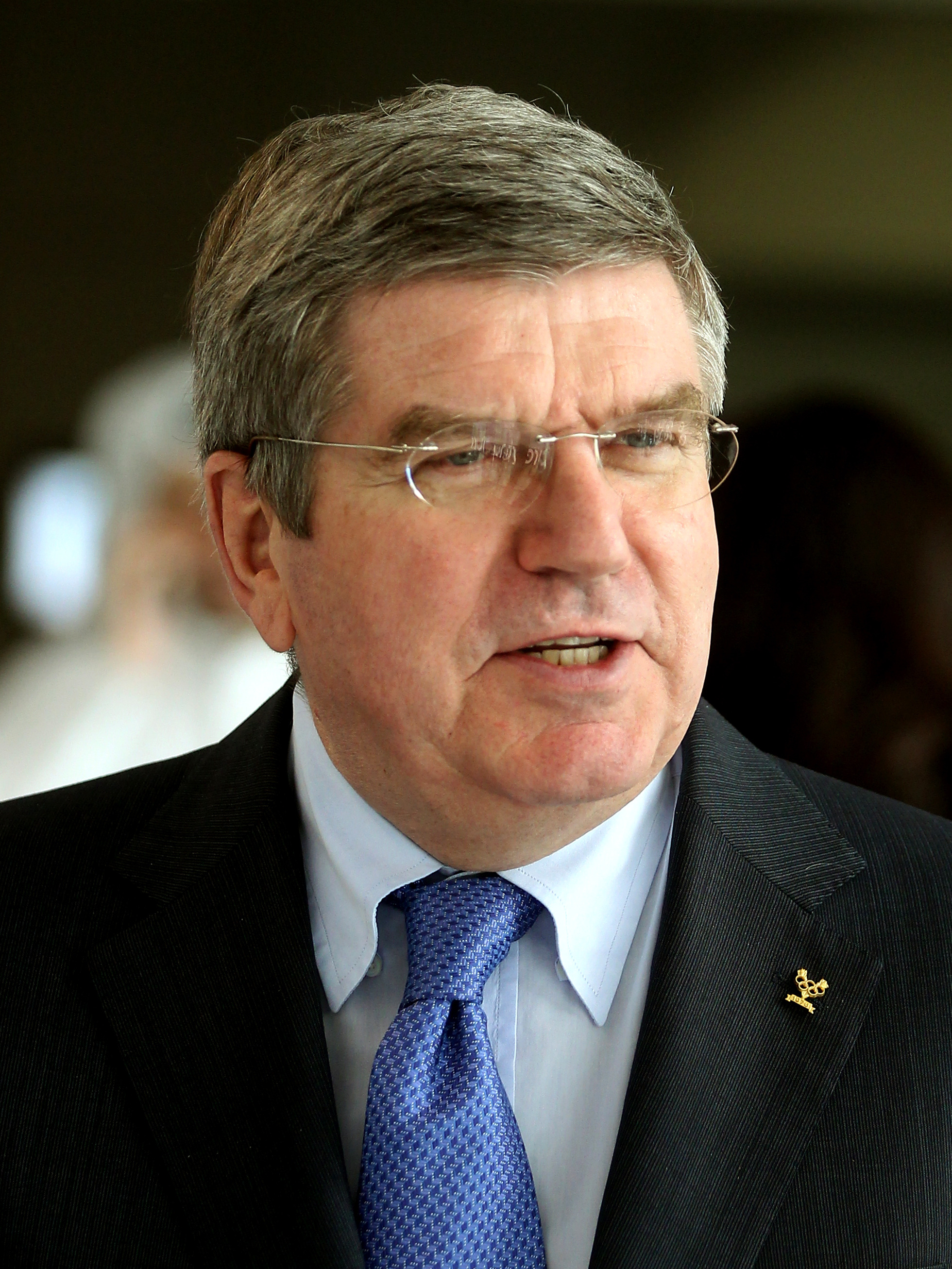

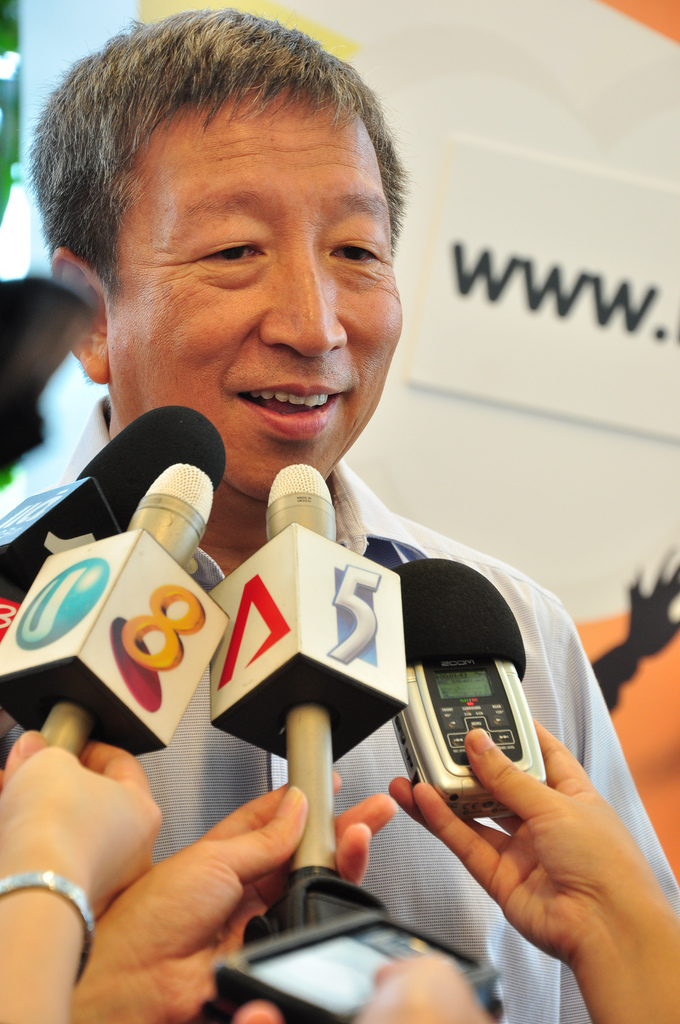

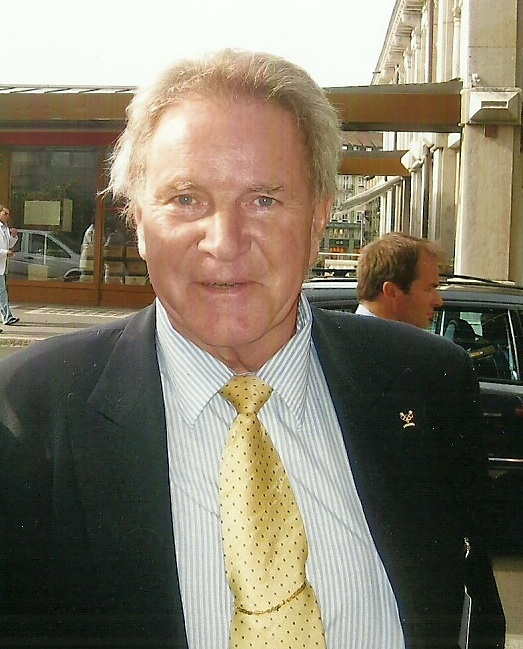

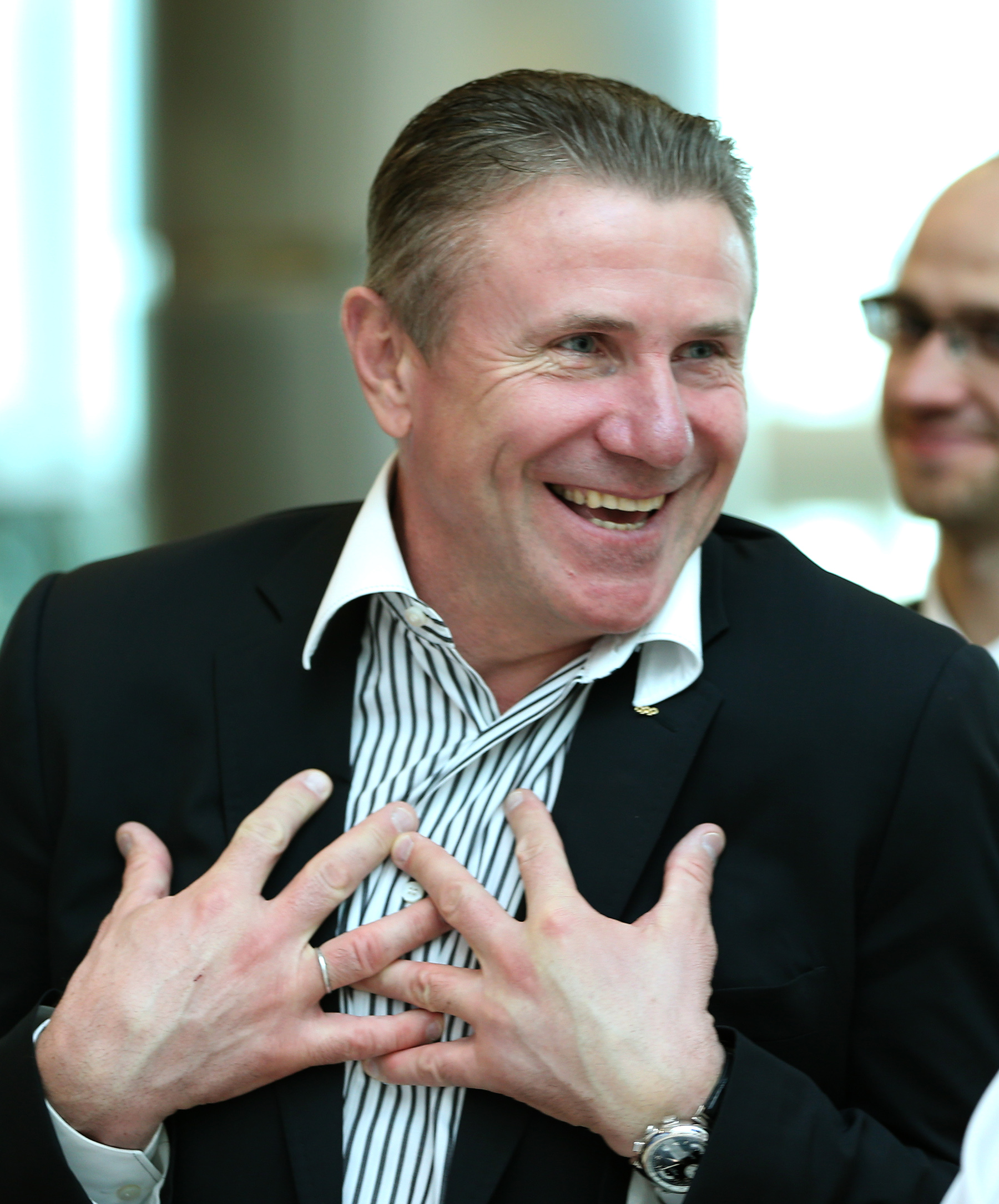

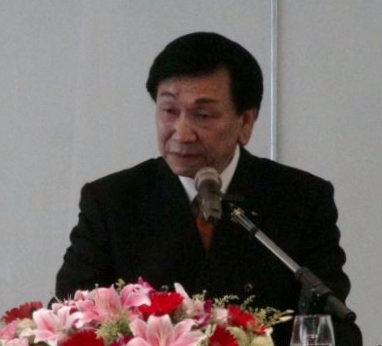
Candidate	Thomas Bach	Richard Carrión	Ng Ser Miang
Home state	Germany	Puerto Rico	Singapore
Popular vote	43 (first round); 49 (second round)	23 (first round); 29 (second round)	6 (first round); 6 (second round)
Candidate	Denis Oswald	Sergey Bubka	Wu Ching-kuo
Home state	Switzerland	Ukraine	Chinese Taipei
Popular vote	7 (first round); 5 (second round)	8 (first round); 4 (second round)	6 (first round); Eliminated (second round)
President before election
(Belgium) Jacques Rogge
Elected President
(Germany) Thomas Bach

The 125th IOC Session took place at the Buenos Aires Hilton in Buenos Aires, Argentina, from 7 to 10 September 2013. On 7 September, the International Olympic Committee (IOC) elected Tokyo as the host city of the 2020 Summer Olympic Games. Wrestling was restored to the Olympic sports program for 2020 and 2024. Thomas Bach was elected to an eight-year term as IOC President on 10 September.

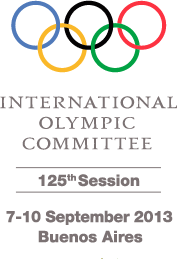
The official banner of the 125th IOC Session

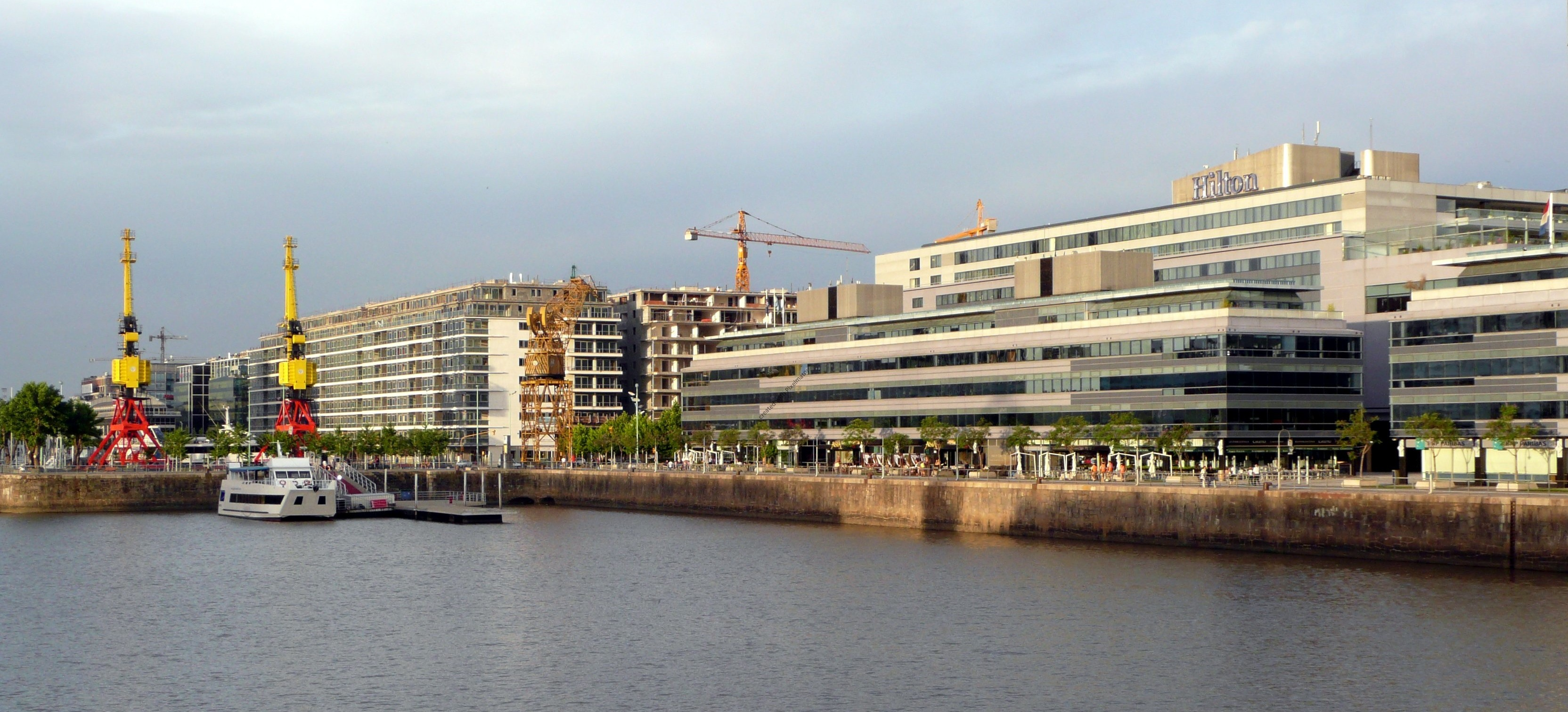
The Buenos Aires Hilton where the session was held

== Session host city selection ==
The IOC received bids from two cities to host the 125th Session: the Argentine capital Buenos Aires and the Malaysian capital Kuala Lumpur made bids. Buenos Aires was elected at the 122nd IOC Session in Vancouver which took place prior to the 2010 Winter Olympics.

== 2020 Olympic host city election ==
The members of the IOC elected the host city of the 2020 Olympic Games on 7 September 2013. The candidates were Tokyo, Istanbul, and Madrid. Prior to the vote, the contest was considered to be close between the three cities. Tokyo was awarded the 2020 Summer Olympics. The results of the exhaustive ballot were as follows:

Election of the Host City of the 2020 Summer Olympics — ballot results
City	Country	Round		
City	Country	1	Runoff	2
Tokyo	Japan	42 (44.68%)	—	60 (62.50%)
Istanbul	Turkey	26 (27.66%)	49 (52.13%)	36 (37.50%)
Madrid	Spain	26 (27.66%)	45 (47.87%)	—
125th IOC Session	Vote details	Round		
125th IOC Session	Vote details	1	Runoff	2
125th Session of the International Olympic Committee. Buenos Aires – Argentina	Eligible	94	94	96
125th Session of the International Olympic Committee. Buenos Aires – Argentina	Participants			
125th Session of the International Olympic Committee. Buenos Aires – Argentina	Abstentions			
125th Session of the International Olympic Committee. Buenos Aires – Argentina	Valid ballots			
Members unable to vote
Members from countries with candidate cities		Other members		
(Japan) Tsunekazu Takeda (Spain) Juan Antonio Samaranch, Marisol Casado, José Perurena (Turkey) Uğur Erdener		(Belgium) Jacques Rogge (IOC president) (Under IOC rules the President is permitted to vote, but President Rogge elected not to participate in the vote at the 125th Session)		

Following Madrid's elimination after a tie-breaking vote with Istanbul, the three Spanish IOC members were eligible to take part in the final round of voting.

=== Reaction ===
The announcement was met with jubilation from the Tokyo delegation and across Japan. Japanese prime minister Shinzō Abe, who had given a personal address during the presentation stage, said "I would like to thank everyone in the Olympic movement and we will host a wonderful Olympic Games." Japanese fencer Yuki Ota alluded to the 2011 earthquake in a statement to reporters, "After the earthquake everyone in Japan was depressed but now we have to make a dream come true."

Abe's role in the final stages of the bid, including his reassurances to the IOC that Fukushima radiation would not affect Tokyo, was considered to be a major asset. Tokyo's bid had also received support from Princess Hisako and Sheikh Ahmad Al-Fahad Al-Sabah. Madrid's bid was considered to have been hampered by Spain's weak economy and Istanbul's was considered to have been damaged by recent internal political instability and doping scandals, as well as match fixing in 2011.

=== Later investigations ===
After Tokyo was selected as host city, the bidding process became the subject of investigations in France concerning payments made by the Tokyo bid committee to Black Tidings, a Singapore-based consultancy. Reuters reported that Tokyo bid president Tsunekazu Takeda approved a payment of nearly US$1 million to Black Tidings shortly before the 2013 host-city vote, and that Dentsu, an IOC marketing partner, had supported Tokyo's bid campaign.

The Tokyo 2020 organising structure was later affected by separate bribery and bid-rigging investigations. Former Tokyo 2020 executive board member Haruyuki Takahashi, a former senior executive at Dentsu, was accused of receiving payments from companies in connection with Olympic sponsorship and licensing contracts. In 2023, Japanese prosecutors indicated Dentsu, Hakuhodo and other companies over alleged bid-rigging related to Tokyo Olympic contracts.

== IOC presidential election ==
On 10 September 2013, Thomas Bach of Germany was elected to succeed Jacques Rogge as IOC President, winning in two rounds of voting, over five other candidates. The results of the vote were as follows:

Election of the 9th IOC President
Candidate	Round 1	Runoff	Round 2
(Germany) Thomas Bach	43	—	49
(Puerto Rico) Richard Carrión	23	—	29
(Singapore) Ng Ser Miang	6	56	6
(Switzerland) Denis Oswald	7	—	5
(Ukraine) Sergey Bubka	8	—	4
(Chinese Taipei) Wu Ching-kuo	6	36	—

== Election of new IOC members ==
Nine individuals were elected IOC members at the 125th IOC Session on 10 September:

- (Romania) Octavian Morariu
- (Brazil) Bernard Rajzman
- (Philippines) Mikee Cojuangco-Jaworski
- (Russia) Alexander Zhukov
- (Kenya) Paul Tergat
- (United States) Larry Probst
- (Ethiopia) Dagmawit Girmay Berhane
- (Netherlands) Camiel Eurlings
- (Sweden) Stefan Holm

== Olympic gold order ==
King Willem-Alexander of the Netherlands was awarded this highest IOC honor on Sunday 8 September after he relinquished his membership to focus on matters at home.

== Potential new sports ==
The IOC considered wrestling, squash and baseball/softball to the program for the 2020 Summer Olympics. Wrestling had been part of the Ancient Olympic Games and every Modern Olympic Games with the exception of the 1900 Paris Games, however in February 2013 it was dropped from the 2020 Olympic Program. Wrestling successfully campaigned at the 125th Session to be re-included in the 2020 program. The results of the vote on 8 September 2013 were:

Election of the new sport for 2020
Sport	Round 1
Wrestling	49
Baseball/softball	24
Squash	22

=== Baseball/softball ===
Baseball was first included as a demonstration sport at the 1904 Summer Olympics in St. Louis. It was again played as a demonstration sport at the Summer Olympics in 1912, 1936, 1956, 1964, 1984, and 1988. It was first included as an official medal sport at the 1992 Summer Olympics in Barcelona. Baseball then featured at every Summer Olympic Games until the 2008 Olympics in Beijing, where it made its last Olympic appearance.

Softball was included at the Summer Olympics in 1996, 2000, 2004, and 2008.

The governing bodies for baseball (International Baseball Federation) and softball (International Softball Federation) merged in 2013 to form the World Baseball Softball Confederation. The two sports each had a separate bid for joining the Olympic program. Although Baseball and Softball were not successful in being included in the 2020 Olympic core program, in 2016 the Tokyo Olympic Organizing Committee and the WBSC successfully campaigned to have the two sports included in the 2020 Games as a one sport, two discipline event for a one-off appearance.

=== Squash ===
Squash is played in more than 185 countries and by millions of people worldwide. It has been played at various international sporting events, including the Pan American Games since 1995, and the All-Africa Games since 2003. Squash has also been played at both the Commonwealth Games and the Asian Games since 1998.

The sport is governed by the World Squash Federation.

=== Wrestling ===
Wrestling is practiced all around the world, officially in 177 countries, some of which participate in the Olympic Games in this sport alone. It was first introduced in the ancient Olympic Games in 708 BC and was included in all the ancient Olympics from that date. Wrestling has featured at the modern Summer Games since the 1896 Olympics in Athens, and it has been a part of all modern Olympics except those in Paris in 1900. It was still included in the Olympic program at the 2016 Summer Olympics in Rio de Janeiro. Wrestling was initially dropped from the 2020 Olympic program; however, it was given the opportunity to be reselected for the 2020 and 2024 Games.

The sport is governed by United World Wrestling.

== See also ==
- List of IOC meetings
- 121st IOC Session
- 123rd IOC Session
- 127th IOC Session
- 2018 Summer Youth Olympics
