= President of the International Olympic Committee =

Head of the Executive Board of the International Olympic Committee

- Président du Comité international olympique
- Olympic rings

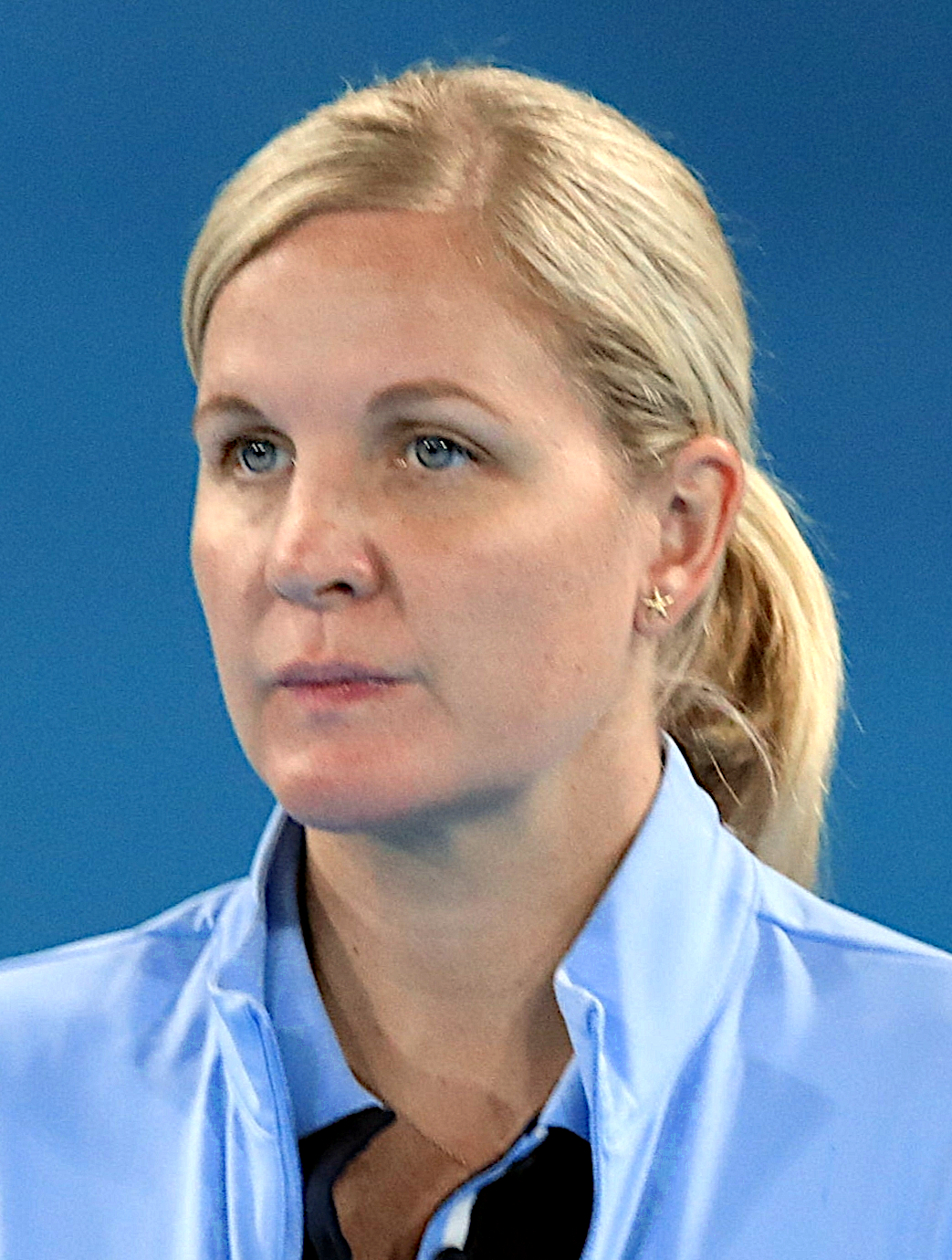
- Incumbent; Kirsty Coventry since 23 June 2025
- International Olympic Committee
- Member of: IOC Executive Board
- Residence: Lausanne Palace
- Seat: IOC Headquarters, Lausanne, Switzerland
- Appointer: IOC Session; Elected by the IOC Members by secret ballot
- Term length: Term of eight years; Renewable once for four years
- Constituting instrument: Olympic Charter
- Formation: 1894
- First holder: Demetrios Vikelas
- Website: International Olympic Committee

The president of the International Olympic Committee is head of the executive board that assumes the general overall responsibility for the administration of the International Olympic Committee (IOC) and the management of its affairs. The IOC Executive Board consists of the chairman president, four vice-presidents, and ten other IOC members; all of the board members are elected by the IOC Session, using a secret ballot, by a majority vote.

The IOC organizes the modern Olympic Games, held every two years, alternating summer and winter games (each every four years). The IOC president holds the office for a maximum of two terms, renewable once. A president serving for two terms would lead the organization for at least three Summer Olympic Games and three Winter Olympic Games.

== Presidents ==
Initially, it was decided that the main representative from the country holding the games would assume the role of IOC president. However, this idea was quickly abandoned. Over the course of over 130 years, only 10 people have been elected to lead the organization, with the tenth taking office in June 2025. To date, only Belgium has had the privilege to hold the position more than once.

No.	Portrait	Name (Birth–Death)	Term of office			Country of origin
No.	Portrait	Name (Birth–Death)	Took office	Left office	Time in office	Country of origin
1		Demetrios Vikelas (1835–1908)	28 June 1894	10 April 1896	1 year, 287 days	Greece
2		Pierre de Coubertin (1863–1937)	10 April 1896	28 May 1925	29 years, 48 days	France
3		Henri de Baillet-Latour (1876–1942)	28 May 1925	6 January 1942 (died in office)	16 years, 223 days	Belgium
4		Johannes Sigfrid Edström (1870–1964)	6 January 1942; 6 September 1946	6 September 1946; 15 August 1952	4 years, 243 days (acting); 5 years, 344 days	Sweden
5		Avery Brundage (1887–1975)	15 August 1952	11 September 1972	20 years, 27 days	United States
6		Michael Morris (1914–1999)	11 September 1972	3 August 1980	7 years, 327 days	Ireland
7		Juan Antonio Samaranch (1920–2010)	3 August 1980	16 July 2001	20 years, 347 days	Spain
8		Jacques Rogge (1942–2021)	16 July 2001	10 September 2013	12 years, 56 days	Belgium
9		Thomas Bach (born 1953)	10 September 2013	23 June 2025	11 years, 286 days	Germany
10		Kirsty Coventry (born 1983)	23 June 2025	Incumbent	1 year, 107 days	Zimbabwe

=== Demetrios Vikelas (1894–1896) ===
The Baron de Coubertin had already attempted to restart the Olympic Games at the congress for the fifth anniversary of the Union des Sociétés Françaises de Sports Athlétiques in 1892. While he may have raised the enthusiasm of the public, he did not manage to establish a proper commitment.

He decided to reiterate his efforts at the next congress in 1894, which would openly address the issue of amateur sports, but also with the sub-text of recreating the Olympic Games. Six of the seven points that would be debated pertained to amateurism (definition, disqualification, betting, etc.) and the seventh point concerned the possibility of restoring the Games. Coubertin also sought to give an international dimension to his congress.

De Coubertin gained support from several personalities: Leopold II of Belgium; Edward, Prince of Wales; Crown Prince Constantine of Greece; William Penny Brookes, the creator of the Wenlock Olympian Games in Shropshire, England; and Ioannis Phokianos, a professor of mathematics and physics and a college principal. Phokianos was also one of the advocates of sport in Greece; he had organized a series of Olympic Games sponsored by Evangelos Zappas in 1875, and in 1888 he had organized an elite and private Games as the founder of the Pan-Hellenic Gymnastic Club. Phokianos could not travel to Paris for financial reasons and because he was finalizing the construction of his new college. Instead, de Coubertin turned to one of the more eminent representatives of the Greek community in Paris—Demetrios Vikelas—whom he invited to take part in the congress. Athens was approved to host the 1896 Olympic Games, Greece being the original home of the Olympics (at Olympia from 776 BC to 393 AD), and Vikelas was duly chosen as the first president of the IOC.

=== Pierre de Coubertin (1896–1925) ===
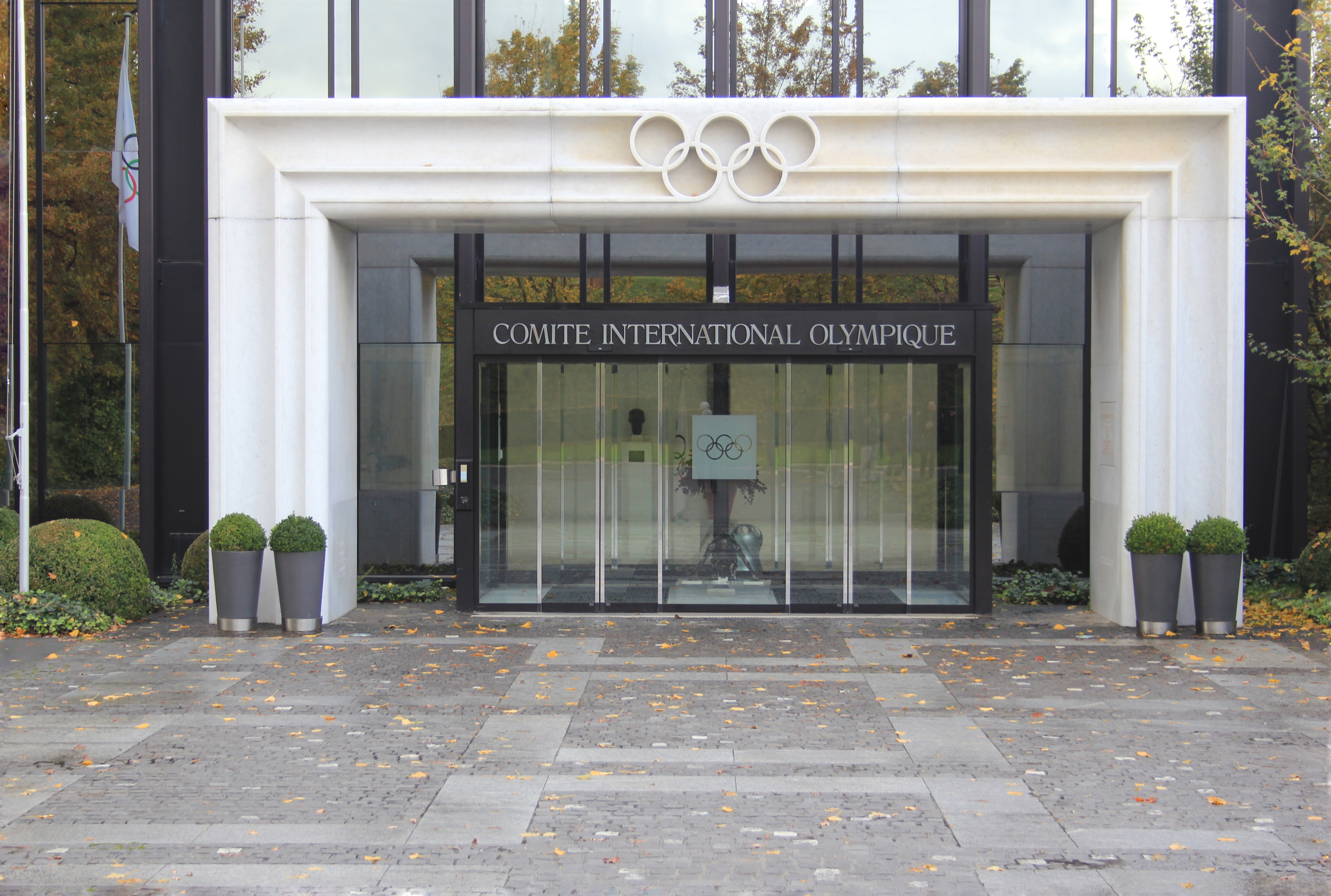
IOC headquarters in Lausanne, Switzerland

Pierre, Baron de Coubertin, took over the IOC presidency when Demetrios Vikelas stepped down after the Olympics in his own country. Despite its initial success, the Olympic Movement faced hard times, as the 1900 Games (in de Coubertin's own Paris) and 1904 Games were both upstaged by World's Fairs—Exposition Universelle in 1900 and Louisiana Purchase Exposition in 1904—and received little attention.

The 1906 Intercalated Games revived the momentum, and the Olympic Games grew to become the most important sports event. De Coubertin created the modern pentathlon for the 1912 Summer Olympics, further created the Olympic flag and Olympic rings in 1913, and selected Lausanne in Switzerland as the permanent home for the IOC in 1915. He announced his intention to step down after the 1924 Summer Olympics, which proved much more successful than the first attempt in Paris in 1900, and was succeeded as IOC president in 1925 by Belgian Henri de Baillet-Latour.

De Coubertin remained an honorary president of the IOC until his death in 1937.

=== Henri de Baillet-Latour (1925–1942) ===
Henri, Comte de Baillet-Latour was elected IOC president in 1925, after the founder of the modern Olympic Movement, Baron de Coubertin, stepped down from the post to become honorary president. The Belgian Comte led the IOC until his death in 1942, when he was succeeded by his vice-president J. Sigfrid Edström.

=== Johannes Sigfrid Edström (1942–1952) ===
When IOC president Henri de Baillet-Latour died in 1942, Swedish industrialist Johannes Sigfrid Edström took over as the acting president until the end of World War II, when he was formally elected IOC president. He played an important role in reviving the Olympic Movement after the war.

In 1931, Edström was involved in the controversial decision to ban legendary Finnish runner Paavo Nurmi from competing at the 1932 Summer Olympics in Los Angeles, as the IOC considered Nurmi to be a professional athlete. This had a negative effect on Finland's relationship with Sweden, as Nurmi was a celebrated national hero in his own country.

Edström retired from the IOC presidency in 1952 and was succeeded by Avery Brundage.

=== Avery Brundage (1952–1972) ===
Avery Brundage became vice-president of the IOC in 1945 and was subsequently elected president in 1952, at the 47th IOC Session in Helsinki, succeeding J. Sigfrid Edström. While he was being considered for this honor, Brundage fathered two sons with a woman to whom he was not married; in order to avoid a political scandal, he requested that his name be kept off the birth certificates.

During his tenure as IOC president, Brundage strongly opposed any form of professionalism in the Olympic Games. Gradually, this opinion became less accepted by the sports world and other IOC members, but his opinions led to some embarrassing incidents, such as the exclusion of Austrian skier Karl Schranz from the 1972 Winter Olympics. Likewise, he opposed the restoration of Olympic medals to Native American athlete Jim Thorpe, who had been stripped of the medals when he was found to have played semi-professional baseball before taking part in the 1912 Summer Olympics (where he had beaten Brundage in the pentathlon and decathlon). Despite this, Brundage accepted the "shamateurism" from Eastern Bloc countries, in which team members were nominally students, soldiers, or civilians working in a non-sports profession, but in reality were paid by their states to train on a full-time basis. Brundage claimed that it was "their way of life". Thorpe's amateur status was restored by the Amateur Athletic Union in 1973, following Brundage's retirement. The IOC officially pardoned Thorpe in 1982 and ordered that his medals be presented posthumously to his family. After his death in 1975, it was revealed that Brundage had notified the IOC that Thorpe had played semi-professional baseball years before.

Brundage also opposed anything that he viewed as politicizing sport. At the 1968 Summer Olympics in Mexico City, U.S. sprinters Tommie Smith and John Carlos raised their fists to show support for the Black Power movement during their medal ceremony. Brundage ordered the USOC to expel both African-American men from the Olympic Village and have them suspended from the U.S. Olympic team. When the USOC refused, he threatened to ban the entire U.S. Olympic team. However, Brundage made no objections against Nazi salutes during the Berlin Olympics.

He may be best remembered for his decision during the 1972 Summer Olympics in Munich, West Germany, to continue the Games following the Black September Palestinian terrorist attack which killed eleven Israeli athletes. While some criticized Brundage's decision—including L.A. Times columnist Jim Murray, who wrote "Incredibly, they're going on with it. It's almost like having a dance at Dachau"—most did not, and few athletes withdrew from the Games. The Olympic competition was suspended on 5 September for one complete day. The next day, a memorial service of eighty thousand spectators and three thousand athletes was held in the Olympic Stadium. Brundage gave an address in which he stated:

"Every civilized person recoils in horror at the barbarous criminal intrusion of terrorists into peaceful Olympic precincts. We mourn our Israeli friends ... victims of this brutal assault. The Olympic flag and the flags of all the world fly at half-mast. Sadly, in this imperfect world, the greater and the more important the Olympic Games become, the more they are open to commercial, political, and now criminal pressure. The Games of the XXth Olympiad have been subject to two savage attacks. We lost the Rhodesian battle against naked political blackmail. I am sure that the public will agree that we cannot allow a handful of terrorists to destroy this nucleus of international cooperation and goodwill we have in the Olympic movement. The Games must go on...."

— Simon Reeve, One Day in September (2000)

Brundage strongly opposed the exclusion of Rhodesia from the Olympics due to its racial policies. After the attacks in Munich, Brundage drew a comparison between the massacre of the Israeli athletes and the barring of the Rhodesian team, for which he later apologized.

Brundage is further remembered for proposing the elimination of all team sports from the Summer Olympic Games, fearing that the Games would become too expensive for all but the wealthiest nations to host; he also proposed the elimination of the Winter Olympic Games entirely due to its association with commercialism. Brundage retired as IOC president after the 1972 Summer Games, having held the post for twenty years, and was succeeded by Lord Killanin.

=== Michael Morris (1972–1980) ===
Michael Morris, 3rd Baron Killanin was elected as Honorary President of the Olympic Council of Ireland (OCI) in 1950, and became the Irish delegate at the IOC in 1952. He eventually became senior vice-president of the IOC in 1968, and succeeded Avery Brundage to the presidency on 23 August 1972, being elected at the 73rd IOC Session in Munich, just prior to the 1972 Summer Olympics.

The Olympic Movement experienced a difficult period during his presidency, having to deal with the aftermath of the tragedy at the 1972 Munich Games and the financial failure of the 1976 Montréal Games. Due to limited interest from potential hosts, the cities of Lake Placid, New York and Los Angeles, California were chosen to host the 1980 Winter Games and the 1984 Summer Games, respectively, in the absence of any competing cities.

Baron Killanin resigned prior to the 1980 Summer Olympics in Moscow, after the massive political boycott of those Games in protest of the Soviet invasion of Afghanistan, but retained his position until the Games were completed.

=== Juan Antonio Samaranch (1980–2001) ===
Juan Antonio Samaranch (who was later created the 1st marquess of Samaranch) was elected President of the IOC on 16 July at the 83rd IOC Session in Moscow, that was held prior to the 1980 Summer Olympics—between 15 and 18 July 1980. He officially assumed presidency at the end of the Moscow Olympics.

During his term, Samaranch managed to make the Olympic Movement financially healthy, with big television deals and sponsorships. Although the 1984 Summer Olympics were boycotted by the Eastern Bloc countries, a record number of athletes participated in those Games, and the number of nations with an IOC membership and participating increased at every Games during his presidency. Samaranch also wanted the best athletes to compete in the Olympics, which led to the gradual acceptance of professional athletes.

One achievement of Samaranch has undoubtedly been the financial rescue of the IOC, which was in financial crisis in the 1970s. The games themselves were such a burden on host cities that it appeared that no host would be found for future Olympiads. Under Samaranch, the IOC revamped its sponsorship arrangements (choosing to go with global sponsors rather than allowing each national federation to take local ones), and new broadcasting deals which brought in much money.

==== Criticism ====
Also during his tenure as IOC president, Samaranch insisted that he be addressed with the title of "Excellency", a title used for heads of state and government (the title of Excellency is, however, also used to address Grandees of Spain, and he was a Spanish Marquis and Grandee since late 1991). In addition, when he traveled to conduct Olympic business, he would insist on a chauffeured limousine as well as a presidential suite in the finest hotel of whatever city he visited. The IOC put an annual rental (at a cost of US$500,000 per year) at a presidential suite for his stays in Lausanne.

Besides his lavish accommodations, he was increasingly criticized for the judging and doping scandals and rampant corruption that occurred under his watch. A closed-door inquiry later expelled several IOC members for accepting bribes but cleared Samaranch of wrongdoing. Samaranch declared that the IOC's worst crisis was over but a group of former Olympic athletes, led by Mark Tewksbury, continued to push for his removal.

It became a tradition for Samaranch, when giving the president's address at the close of each Summer Olympics, to praise the organizers at each Olympiad for putting on "the best ever" Games.

=== Jacques Rogge (2001–2013) ===
Jacques Rogge (later created The 1st count Rogge) was elected as president of the IOC on 16 July 2001 at the 112th IOC Session in Moscow as the successor to Juan Antonio Samaranch, who had led the IOC since 1980.

Under his leadership, the IOC aimed to create more possibilities for developing countries to bid for and host the Olympic Games. Rogge believes that this vision can be achieved in the not too distant future through government backing and new IOC policies that constrain the size, complexity and cost of hosting the Olympic Games.

At the 2002 Salt Lake City Olympics, Rogge became the first IOC president to stay in the Olympic village, to enjoy closer contact with the athletes.

During the opening ceremonies of the 2010 Vancouver Olympics, Rogge delivered a commemoration of Georgian luge athlete, after his fatal accident while practicing in Whistler on 12 February 2010.

Rogge retired at the end of the 125th IOC Session in Buenos Aires and was appointed to the lifetime position of Honorary President of the IOC. Rogge died on 29 August 2021 at the age of 79.

==== Controversies ====
For the 2008 Summer Olympics in Beijing, Rogge stated in mid-July 2008 that there would be no Internet censorship by the mainland authorities: "For the first time, foreign media will be able to report freely and publish their work freely in China." However, on 30 July 2008, IOC spokesman Kevan Gosper had to retract that statement, admitting that the Internet would indeed be censored for journalists. Gosper, who said he had not heard about this, suggested that high IOC officials (probably including the Dutch Hein Verbruggen and Swiss IOC executive director Gilbert Felli—and most likely with Rogge's knowledge) had made a secret deal with Chinese officials to allow the censorship, without the knowledge of either the press or most members of the IOC. Rogge later denied that any such meeting had taken place, but did not insist that China adhere to its prior assurances that the Internet would not be censored.

Rogge commented that Usain Bolt's gestures of jubilation and excitement after winning the 100 meters in Beijing are "not the way we perceive being a champion", and also said that he "should show more respect for his competitors". In response to his comments, Yahoo Sports columnist Dan Wetzel, who covered the Games, described him as "a classic stiff-collared bureaucrat", and further contended that "[the IOC] has made billions off athletes such as Bolt for years, yet he has to find someone to pick on." In an interview with The Irish Times' reporter Ian O'Riordan, Rogge clarified, "Maybe there was a little bit of a misunderstanding. ... What he does before or after the race I have no problem with. I just thought that his gesticulation during the race was maybe a little disrespectful."

He rejected calls for a minute of silence to be held to commemorate the 40th anniversary of the 1972 Munich Games attack during the opening ceremonies of the 2012 Summer Olympics, despite the standing request of the families of the 11 Israeli Olympic team members who were held hostage and murdered by the Palestinian group Black September. Calls for such a commemoration marking 40 years since the massacre had also come from Jewish organizations worldwide and politicians from the United States, Israel, Canada, Italy, Australia, and Germany. He and the IOC instead opted for a smaller ceremony in London that took place on 6 August, and one at Fürstenfeldbruck Air Base on the 40th anniversary of the attack, 5 September.

=== Thomas Bach (2013–2025) ===
Thomas Bach was elected President of the IOC on 10 September 2013, as the successor to Jacques Rogge, at the 125th IOC Session in Buenos Aires. The 2014 Winter Olympics in Sochi, Russia was the first edition of the Olympic Games Bach presided over as President.

=== Kirsty Coventry (2025–present) ===
Kirsty Coventry was elected President of the IOC on 20 March 2025, as the successor to Thomas Bach, at the 144th IOC Session in Pylos, Greece. She is the first female and first African IOC president. The 2026 Winter Olympics in Milan and Cortina d’Ampezzo, Italy was the first edition of the Olympics she presided over as IOC President.

== See also ==
- Presidents of the International Paralympic Committee
