= List of Olympic Games host cities =

Map of host cities and countries of the modern summer (orange) and winter (blue) Olympics. * Tokyo hosted the 2020 Summer Olympics in 2021, postponed due to the COVID-19 pandemic. In the SVG file, tap or hover over a city to show its name (only on the desktop).

The modern Olympics began in 1896. Since then, summer and winter games have usually celebrated a four-year period known as an Olympiad. From the inaugural Winter Games in 1924 until 1992, winter and summer Games were held in the same year. Since 1994, summer and winter Games have been held in staggered even years. The last Olympic games were held in both Milan and Cortina, the first to ever be hosted by two cities, in February 2026. Through 2026, there have been 30 Summer Olympic Games, held in 23 cities, and 25 Winter Olympic Games, held in 22 cities. In addition, three summer and two winter editions of the games were scheduled to take place but were later cancelled due to war: Berlin (summer) in 1916; Sapporo–Garmisch-Partenkirchen (winter) and Tokyo–Helsinki (summer) in 1940; and Cortina d'Ampezzo (winter) and London (summer) in 1944. The 1906 Intercalated Olympics were officially sanctioned and held in Athens. However, in 1949, the International Olympic Committee (IOC) decided to unrecognize the 1906 Games. The 2020 Summer Olympics in Tokyo were postponed for the first time in the Olympics history to summer 2021 due to the COVID-19 pandemic, with the 2022 Winter Olympics being held roughly six months later in Beijing which also hosted the 2008 Summer Olympics.

Four cities and regions have been chosen by the IOC to host upcoming Olympic Games: Los Angeles for the 2028 Summer Olympics; the 2030 Winter Olympics will be the first Olympic Games to be hosted by a region (the French Alps—comprising 7 cities and towns); Brisbane will host the 2032 Summer Olympics; and Utah will host the 2034 Winter Olympics.

In 2022, Beijing became the first city to have hosted both the Summer and Winter Olympics. By 2034, eleven cities will have hosted the Olympic Games more than once: Athens (1896 and 2004 Summer Olympics), Paris (1900, 1924 and 2024 Summer Olympics), London (1908, 1948 and 2012 Summer Olympics), St. Moritz (1928 and 1948 Winter Olympics), Lake Placid (1932 and 1980 Winter Olympics), Los Angeles (1932, 1984 and 2028 Summer Olympics), Cortina d'Ampezzo (1956 and 2026 Winter Olympics), Innsbruck (1964 and 1976 Winter Olympics), Tokyo (1964 and 2020 Summer Olympics), Beijing (2008 Summer Olympics and 2022 Winter Olympics) and Salt Lake City (2002 and 2034 Winter Olympics). Stockholm hosted the 1912 Summer Olympics and the equestrian portion of the 1956 Summer Olympics. London and Paris have both hosted three Games, while Los Angeles will become the third city to gain that distinction in 2028.

As of 2026, a large majority of the Games (42 out of 55) have been hosted in Western Europe, the United States, Canada, or Australia. Eight Games have been hosted in Asia (all in East Asia), three in Eastern Europe, and two in Latin America. Africa has yet to host an Olympic Games. Other major geographic regions and subcontinents that have never hosted the Olympics include the Middle East, Central Asia, the Indian subcontinent, Southeast Asia, and the Caribbean. Between the first Winter Olympics in 1924 and the last ones to be held in the same year as the Summer Olympics in 1992, the Summer and Winter Games took place in the same country three times.

Usually, the Games' host cities are selected by the IOC members six to seven years in advance.

Until the 2022 Winter Olympics, the selection process lasts approximately two years. In the first stage, any city in the world may apply to become a host city. After ten months, the executive board of the IOC decides which applicant cities will become official candidates based on the recommendation of a working group that reviews the applications. In the second stage, the candidate cities are investigated thoroughly by an Evaluation Commission, which then submits a final short list of cities for selection. The host city is then chosen by vote of the IOC session, a general meeting of IOC members. There was a change in host selection process in the late 2010s to address several problems – including the costs of hosting and the disappointment felt by unsuccessful applicants. Called Olympic Agenda 2020, this new process is focused on reducing the cost of Games, minimising wasteful single-use construction projects and increasing the benefits felt by host nations. Bids are now easier and less expensive to prepare.

== Olympic Games host cities ==
=== Host cities for Summer and Winter Olympic Games ===
Key

† Cancelled
§ Postponed

Year		Summer	Winter	City or area	Country	Region	Opening ceremony	Closing ceremony	Ref.
	1896	I		Athens	Greece	Europe	6 April 1896	15 April 1896	
	1900	II		Paris	France	Europe	14 May 1900	28 October 1900	
	1904	III		St. Louis (Note: Originally awarded to Chicago, but moved to St. Louis to coincide with the World's Fair.)	United States	North America	1 July 1904	23 November 1904	
	1908	IV		London (Note: Originally awarded to Rome, but moved to London after the eruption of Mount Vesuvius.)	United Kingdom	Europe	27 April 1908	31 October 1908	
	1912	V		Stockholm	Sweden	Europe	6 July 1912	22 July 1912	
†	1916	VI		Berlin	Germany	Europe	Cancelled due to WWI		
	1920	VII		Antwerp (Note: The sailing events in 1920 were held in Ostend, Belgium and in Amsterdam, Netherlands.)	Belgium	Europe	14 August 1920	12 September 1920	
	1924		I	Chamonix	France	Europe	25 January 1924	5 February 1924	
	1924	VIII		Paris	France	Europe	5 July 1924	27 July 1924	
	1928		II	St. Moritz	Switzerland	Europe	11 February 1928	19 February 1928	
	1928	IX		Amsterdam	Netherlands	Europe	28 July 1928	12 August 1928	
	1932		III	Lake Placid	United States	North America	4 February 1932	13 February 1932	
	1932	X		Los Angeles	United States	North America	30 July 1932	14 August 1932	
	1936		IV	Garmisch-Partenkirchen	Germany	Europe	6 February 1936	16 February 1936	
	1936	XI		Berlin	Germany	Europe	1 August 1936	16 August 1936	
†	1940		V	Sapporo Garmisch-Partenkirchen (Note: The 1940 Winter Olympics were originally awarded to Sapporo, Japan, but the commencement of the Second Sino-Japanese War in 1937 caused them to be relocated to Garmisch-Partenkirchen, Nazi Germany, before being cancelled in 1939 because of World War II.)	Japan; Germany	Asia; Europe	Cancelled due to WWII		
†	1940	XII		Tokyo Helsinki (Note: The 1940 Summer Olympics were originally awarded to Tokyo, Japan, but the commencement of the Second Sino-Japanese War in 1937 caused them to be relocated to Helsinki, Finland, before being cancelled in 1939 because of World War II.)	Japan; Finland	Asia; Europe	Cancelled due to WWII		
†	1944		V	Cortina d'Ampezzo	Italy	Europe	Cancelled due to WWII		
†	1944	XIII		London	United Kingdom	Europe	Cancelled due to WWII		
	1948		V	St. Moritz	Switzerland	Europe	30 January 1948	8 February 1948	
	1948	XIV		London	United Kingdom	Europe	29 July 1948	14 August 1948	
	1952		VI	Oslo	Norway	Europe	14 February 1952	25 February 1952	
	1952	XV		Helsinki	Finland	Europe	19 July 1952	3 August 1952	
	1956		VII	Cortina d'Ampezzo	Italy	Europe	26 January 1956	5 February 1956	
	1956	XVI		Melbourne Stockholm (Note: Equestrian events were held in Stockholm, Sweden, due to Australian quarantine laws. Stockholm had to bid for the equestrian competition separately; it received its own Olympic flame and had its own formal invitations and opening and closing ceremonies as per the regular Summer Olympics.)	Australia; Sweden	Oceania; Europe	22 November 1956; 10 June 1956	8 December 1956; 17 June 1956	
	1960		VIII	Squaw Valley (Note: Now Olympic Valley.)	United States	North America	18 February 1960	28 February 1960	
	1960	XVII		Rome	Italy	Europe	27 August 1960	11 September 1960	
	1964		IX	Innsbruck	Austria	Europe	29 January 1964	9 February 1964	
	1964	XVIII		Tokyo	Japan	Asia	10 October 1964	24 October 1964	
	1968		X	Grenoble	France	Europe	6 February 1968	18 February 1968	
	1968	XIX		Mexico City	Mexico	North America	12 October 1968	27 October 1968	
	1972		XI	Sapporo	Japan	Asia	3 February 1972	13 February 1972	
	1972	XX		Munich	West Germany	Europe	26 August 1972	11 September 1972 (Note: Originally scheduled to end on 10 September 1972, but was postponed by one day after events had been suspended for 34 hours because of the Munich massacre, which happened after day 9.)	
	1976		XII	Innsbruck (Note: Originally awarded to Denver, Colorado, US, in 1970, but in 1972, after a failed referendum, Denver withdrew. The IOC eventually decided to relocate the Games to Innsbruck, Austria.)	Austria	Europe	4 February 1976	15 February 1976	
	1976	XXI		Montreal	Canada	North America	17 July 1976	1 August 1976	
	1980		XIII	Lake Placid	United States	North America	13 February 1980	24 February 1980	
	1980	XXII		Moscow	Soviet Union (Note: Russia (like the former Soviet Union) spans the continents of Europe and Asia. However, the Russian Olympic Committee is part of the European Olympic Committees and has its official seat in Moscow (this was also the case for the former Soviet Olympic Committee). Also, Moscow is on the European side of the most commonly recognized boundary between Europe and Asia (Sochi is in Asia per the usual geographic boundary, being just south of the Greater Caucasus' western end; but political approximations of the continental boundary place it in Europe).)	Europe	19 July 1980	3 August 1980	
	1984		XIV	Sarajevo	Yugoslavia (Note: Located in present-day Bosnia and Herzegovina, then part of the Socialist Federal Republic of Yugoslavia.)	Europe	8 February 1984	19 February 1984	
	1984	XXIII		Los Angeles	United States	North America	28 July 1984	12 August 1984	
	1988		XV	Calgary	Canada	North America	13 February 1988	28 February 1988	
	1988	XXIV		Seoul	South Korea	Asia	17 September 1988	2 October 1988	
	1992		XVI	Albertville	France	Europe	8 February 1992	23 February 1992	
	1992	XXV		Barcelona	Spain	Europe	25 July 1992	9 August 1992	
	1994		XVII	Lillehammer	Norway	Europe	12 February 1994	27 February 1994	
	1996	XXVI		Atlanta	United States	North America	19 July 1996	4 August 1996	
	1998		XVIII	Nagano	Japan	Asia	7 February 1998	22 February 1998	
	2000	XXVII		Sydney	Australia	Oceania	15 September 2000	1 October 2000	
	2002		XIX	Salt Lake City	United States	North America	8 February 2002	24 February 2002	
	2004	XXVIII		Athens	Greece	Europe	13 August 2004	29 August 2004	
	2006		XX	Turin	Italy	Europe	10 February 2006	26 February 2006	
	2008	XXIX		Beijing (Note: Equestrian events were held in Hong Kong. Although Hong Kong's separate NOC conducted the equestrian competition, it was an integral part of the Beijing Games: unlike the 1956 Stockholm equestrian competition, it was not conducted under a separate Hong Kong bid, separate flame, etc.)	China	Asia	8 August 2008	24 August 2008	
	2010		XXI	Vancouver	Canada	North America	12 February 2010	28 February 2010	
	2012	XXX		London	United Kingdom	Europe	27 July 2012	12 August 2012	
	2014		XXII	Sochi	Russia	Europe	7 February 2014	23 February 2014	
	2016	XXXI		Rio de Janeiro	Brazil	South America	5 August 2016	21 August 2016	
	2018		XXIII	Pyeongchang	South Korea	Asia	9 February 2018	25 February 2018	
§	2020	XXXII		Tokyo	Japan	Asia	23 July 2021 (Note: The 2020 Summer Olympics were originally scheduled for 24 July to 9 August 2020, but were postponed to 2021 due to the COVID-19 pandemic. However, the event was still referred to as the 2020 Summer Olympics (marking the 32nd Olympiad) to preserve the 4-year Olympiad cycle.)	8 August 2021	
	2022		XXIV	Beijing	China	Asia	4 February 2022	20 February 2022	
	2024	XXXIII		Paris (Note: Surfing events were held in France's overseas collectivity of French Polynesia, where there is a separate NOC that is not a member of the International Olympic Committee.)	France	Europe	26 July 2024	11 August 2024	
	2026		XXV	Milan Cortina d'Ampezzo	Italy	Europe	6 February 2026	22 February 2026	
	2028	XXXIV		Los Angeles	United States	North America	14 July 2028	30 July 2028	
	2030		XXVI	Alpes (Note: The Olympic Host Contract officially designates the regions of Auvergne-Rhône-Alpes and Provence-Alpes-Côte d'Azur as the hosts of the 2030 Winter Olympics.) Heerenveen (Note: Speed skating events will be held in Heerenveen.)	France; Netherlands	Europe	1 February 2030	17 February 2030	
	2032	XXXV		Brisbane	Australia	Oceania	23 July 2032	8 August 2032	
	2034		XXVII	Utah	United States	North America	3 February 2034	19 February 2034	

- The 1906 Intercalated Games, which took place in Athens, are no longer officially recognized by the IOC as an official Olympic Games.
- The IOC has also entered "privileged dialogue" with Switzerland for the 2038 Winter Games.

=== Host cities for multiple Summer and Winter Olympic Games ===
List of cities that hosted multiple editions of the Olympic Games
Total	City	Country	Region	Summer Olympics	Winter Olympics
3	London	United Kingdom	Europe	3 (1908, 1948, 2012)	
3	Los Angeles	United States	North America	3 (1932, 1984, 2028)	
3	Paris	France	Europe	3 (1900, 1924, 2024)	
2	Albertville	France	Europe		2 (1992, 2030)
2	Athens	Greece	Europe	2 (1896, 2004)	
2	Beijing	China	Asia	1 (2008)	1 (2022)
2	Cortina d'Ampezzo	Italy	Europe		2 (1956, 2026)
2	Innsbruck	Austria	Europe		2 (1964, 1976)
2	Lake Placid	United States	North America		2 (1932, 1980)
2	Salt Lake City	United States	North America		2 (2002, 2034)
2	St. Moritz	Switzerland	Europe		2 (1928, 1948)
2	Tokyo	Japan	Asia	2 (1964, 2020)	

- Italics denote future events

== Number of Olympic Games by country ==
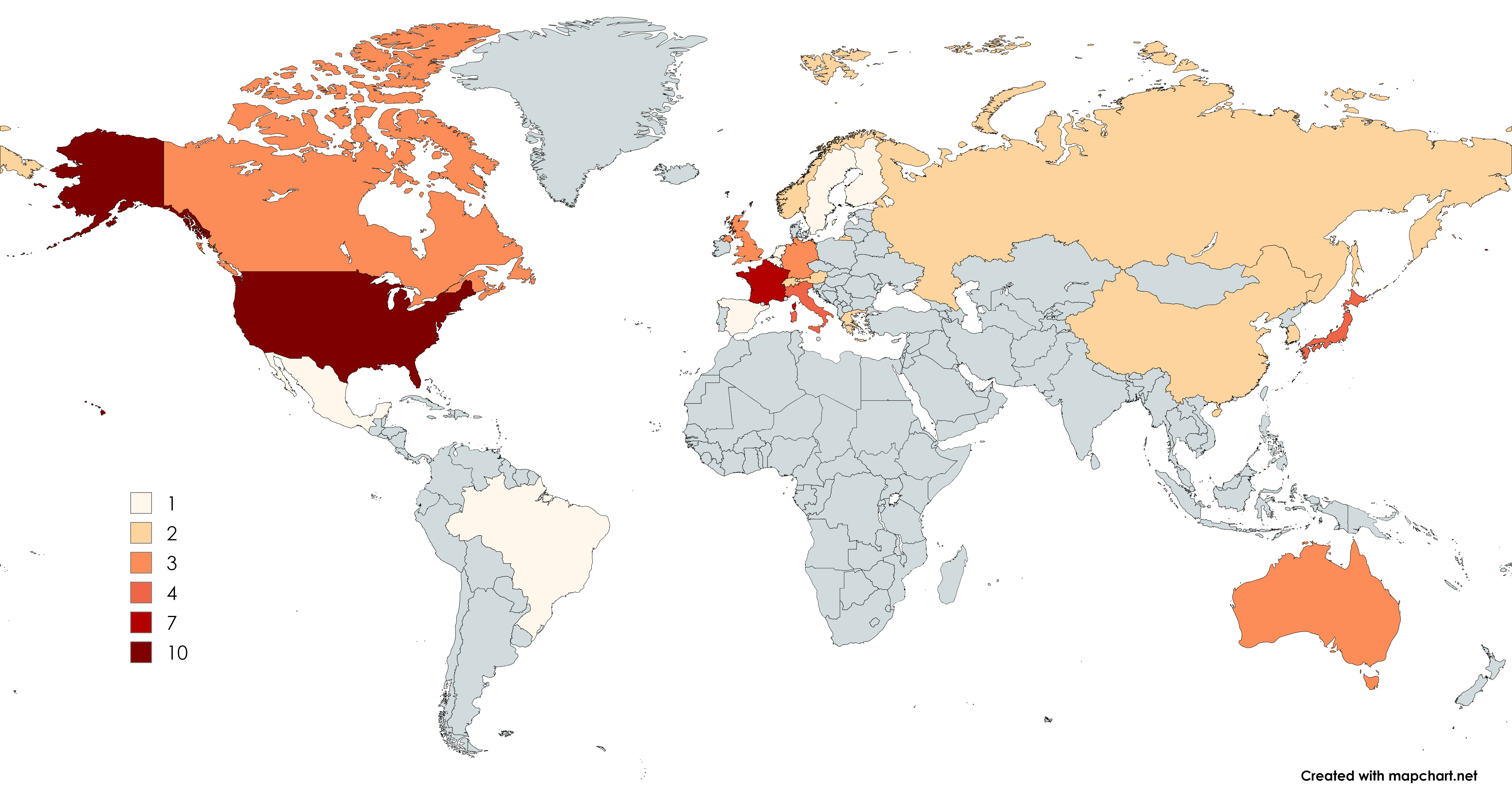
Nations that have hosted or will host the Olympics: 10 times 7 times 4 times 3 times Twice Once Never held games

List of countries ranked by the number of times they hosted or will host the Olympic Games
Total	Country	Region	First year	Last year	Summer Olympics	Winter Olympics
10	United States	North America	1904	2034	5 (1904, 1932, 1984, 1996, 2028)	5 (1932, 1960, 1980, 2002, 2034)
7	France	Europe	1900	2030	3 (1900, 1924, 2024)	4 (1924, 1968, 1992, 2030)
4	Italy	Europe	1956	2026	1 (1960)	3 (~~1944~~, 1956, 2006, 2026)
4	Japan	Asia	1964	2020	2 (~~1940~~, 1964, 2020)	2 (~~1940~~, 1972, 1998)
3	Australia	Oceania	1956	2032	3 (1956, 2000, 2032)	
3	Canada	North America	1976	2010	1 (1976)	2 (1988, 2010)
3	Germany	Europe	1936	1972	2 (~~1916~~, 1936, 1972)	1 (1936, ~~1940~~)
3	United Kingdom	Europe	1908	2012	3 (1908, ~~1944~~, 1948, 2012)	
2	Austria	Europe	1964	1976		2 (1964, 1976)
2	China	Asia	2008	2022	1 (2008)	1 (2022)
2	Greece	Europe	1896	2004	2 (1896, 2004)	
2	Norway	Europe	1952	1994		2 (1952, 1994)
2	Russia	Europe	1980	2014	1 (1980)	1 (2014)
2	South Korea	Asia	1988	2018	1 (1988)	1 (2018)
2	Switzerland	Europe	1928	1948		2 (1928, ~~1940~~, 1948)
1	Belgium	Europe	1920	1920	1 (1920)	
1	Bosnia and Herzegovina	Europe	1984	1984		1 (1984)
1	Brazil	South America	2016	2016	1 (2016)	
1	Finland	Europe	1952	1952	1 (~~1940~~, 1952)	
1	Mexico	North America	1968	1968	1 (1968)	
1	Netherlands	Europe	1928	1928	1 (1928)	
1	Spain	Europe	1992	1992	1 (1992)	
1	Sweden	Europe	1912	1912	1 (1912)	

== Number of Olympic Games by region ==
Total	Region	First year	Last year	Summer Olympics	Winter Olympics
33	Europe	1896	2030	17 (1896, 1900, 1908, 1912, ~~1916~~, 1920, 1924, 1928, 1936, ~~1940~~, ~~1944~~, 1948, 1952, 1960, 1972, 1980, 1992, 2004, 2012, 2024)	16 (1924, 1928, 1936, ~~1940~~, ~~1944~~, 1948, 1952, 1956, 1964, 1968, 1976, 1984, 1992, 1994, 2006, 2014, 2026, 2030)
14	North America	1904	2034	7 (1904, 1932, 1968, 1976, 1984, 1996, 2028)	7 (1932, 1960, 1980, 1988, 2002, 2010, 2034)
8	Asia	1964	2022	4 (~~1940~~, 1964, 1988, 2008, 2020)	4 (~~1940~~, 1972, 1998, 2018, 2022)
3	Oceania	1956	2032	3 (1956, 2000, 2032)	
1	South America	2016	2016	1 (2016) (Note: The first Olympics to be held in South America.)	
0	Africa	–	–		

Africa has never hosted any Olympics. Egypt, South Africa, and Morocco have been acknowledged as future possibilities, although it is noted that increased dialogue and developments are needed.

In addition, the Middle East, though not a continent (with most of the region situated in Asia), has never hosted an Olympic Games. Several nations have been in talks as potential hosts, but the only city to enter a formal bid was Doha (see also List of bids for the Summer Olympics).

== See also ==
- List of bids for the Summer Olympics
- List of bids for the Winter Olympics
