= 1940 Olympics =

1940 Olympics refers to both:

- The 1940 Winter Olympics, which were originally to be held in Sapporo, Japan before being relocated to Garmisch-Partenkirchen, Germany, but were cancelled due to World War II
- The 1940 Summer Olympics, which were originally to be held in Tokyo, Japan before being relocated to Helsinki, Finland, but were cancelled due to World War II
