= 1944 Olympics =

1944 Olympics may refer to:

- The 1944 Winter Olympics, which were to be held in Cortina d'Ampezzo, Italy, before being cancelled due to World War II
- The 1944 Summer Olympics, which were to be held in London, England, before being cancelled due to World War II
