= Garmisch-Partenkirchen Olympics =

Garmisch-Partenkirchen Olympics

- 1936 Winter Olympics IV Olympic Winter Games
- 1940 Winter Olympics V Olympic Winter Games (suspended for World War II)
