= Cortina d'Ampezzo Olympics =

Cortina d'Ampezzo Olympics

- 1944 Winter Olympics V Olympic Winter Games (suspended for World War II)
- 1956 Winter Olympics VII Olympic Winter Games
- 2026 Winter Olympics XXV Olympic Winter Games, jointly with Milan
