= Theodore Bauer =

Theodore Bauer may refer to:

- Theodore Bauer (bobsledder), West German bobsledder
- Theodore J. Bauer (1909–2005), American disease specialist
