= Albert Kandlbinder =

West German bobsledder

Medal record

Men's Bobsleigh

Representing West Germany

World Championships
Silver medal – second place	1960 Cortina d'Ampezzo	Four-man

Albert Kandlbinder was a West German bobsledder who competed in the late 1950s and early 1960s. He won a silver medal in the four-man event at the 1960 FIBT World Championships in Cortina d'Ampezzo.
