= Kaltenberger =

Kaltenberger is a German surname. Notable people with the surname include:

- Anton Kaltenberger (1904–?), Austrian bobsledder
- Dmitry Kaltenberger (born 1976), Kazakh sprint canoer
- Eduard Kaltenberger, West German bobsledder
- Josh Kaltenberger (born 2001), American football player
