= Massimo Bogana =

Italian bobsledder

Medal record

Bobsleigh

World Championships
| Bronze medal – third place | 1958 Garmisch-Partenkirchen | Four-man |

Massimo Bogana is an Italian bobsledder who competed in the late 1950s. He won the bronze medal in the four-man event at the 1958 FIBT World Championships in Garmisch-Partenkirchen.
