= Winter Olympic Games =

Major international multi-sport event

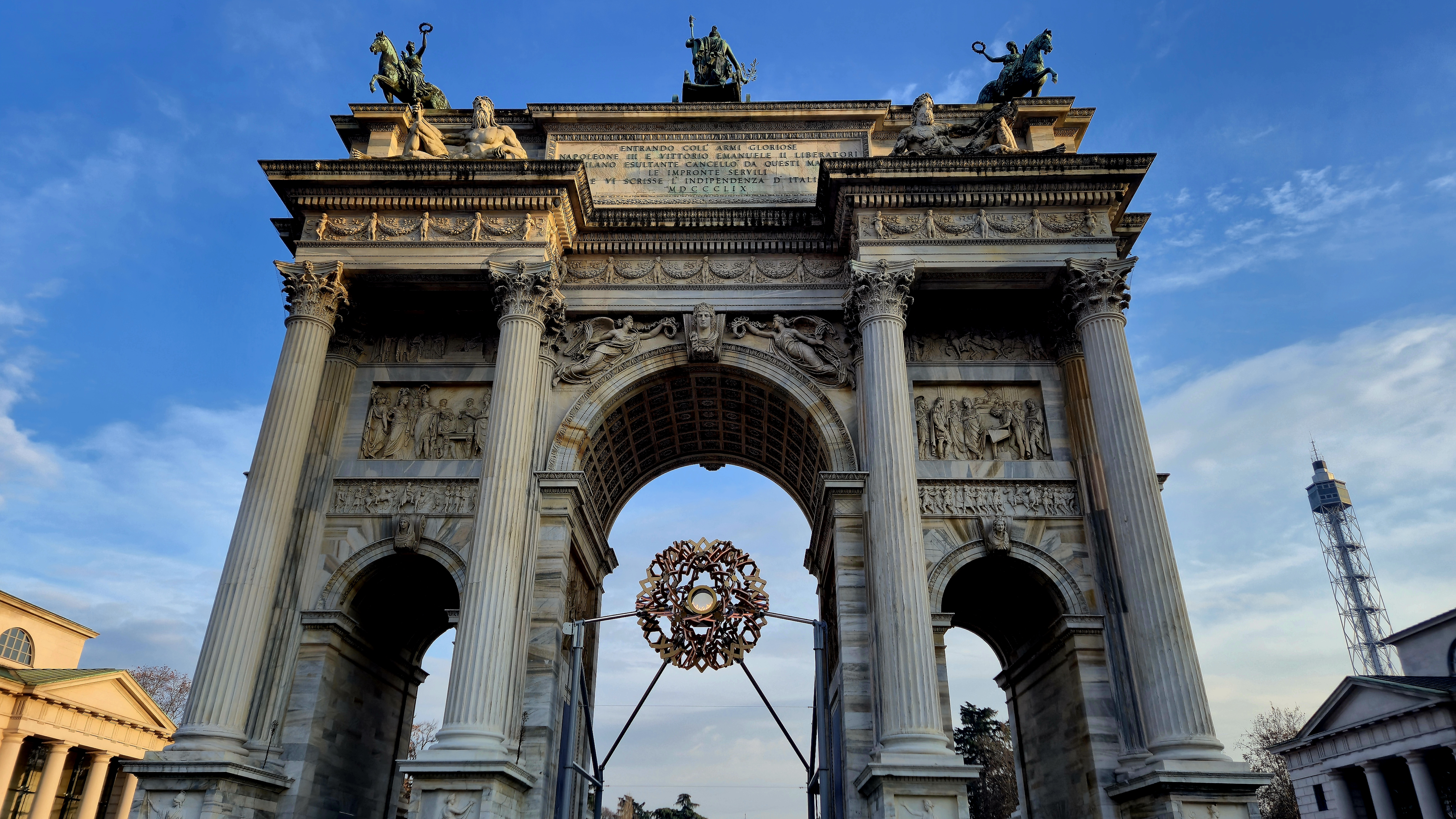
- The Olympic flame in Milan during the 2026 Winter Olympics
- 1924; 1928; 1932; 1936; 1948; 1952; 1956; 1960; 1964; 1968; 1972; 1976; 1980; 1984; 1988; 1992; 1994; 1998; 2002; 2006; 2010; 2014; 2018; 2022; 2026
- Alpine skiing; Biathlon; Bobsleigh; Cross‑country skiing; Curling; Figure skating; Freestyle skiing; Ice hockey; Luge; Nordic combined; Short track speed skating; Skeleton; Ski jumping; Snowboarding; Speed skating

The Winter Olympic Games (French: Jeux olympiques d'hiver), (Note: "French and English are the official languages for the Olympic Games".) also known as the Olympic Winter Games or simply the Winter Olympics, are a major international multi-sport event held once every four years for sports practiced on snow and ice. The Winter Olympics are usually held in February, during the winter season of the Northern Hemisphere. The IOC is the governing body of the Olympic Movement, with the Olympic Charter defining its structure and authority. Milan and Cortina d'Ampezzo of Italy hosted in 2026. The next and XXVI Olympic Winter Games are scheduled to be held between 1 and 17 February 2030 at the French Alps.

The original five Winter Olympic Sports (consisting of nine disciplines) were bobsleigh, curling, ice hockey, Nordic skiing (consisting of the disciplines military patrol, (Note: The official website of the IOC now treats Men's Military Patrol at the 1924 Games as a separate discipline, without mixing it with the sports of Skiing or Biathlon. However, the 1924 Official Report treats it as an event and discipline within what was then called Skiing and is now called Nordic skiing.) cross-country skiing, Nordic combined, and ski jumping), and skating (consisting of the disciplines figure skating and speed skating). (Note: At the closing of the 1924 Games a prize was also awarded for 'alpinisme' (mountaineering), a sport that did not lend itself very well for tournaments: Pierre de Coubertin presented a prize for 'alpinisme' to Charles Granville Bruce, the leader of the expedition that tried to climb Mount Everest in 1922.) The Winter Olympic Games have evolved since their inception. Sports and disciplines have been added and some of them, such as alpine skiing, luge, short track speed skating, freestyle skiing, skeleton, and snowboarding, have earned a permanent spot on the Olympic program. Some others, including curling and bobsleigh, have been discontinued and later reintroduced; others have been permanently discontinued, such as military patrol, though the modern Winter Olympic sport of biathlon is descended from it. Still others, such as speed skiing, bandy and skijoring, were demonstration sports but never incorporated as Olympic sports.

The first Winter Olympic Games, the 1924 Winter Olympics, were held in Chamonix, France. The modern Olympic Games were inspired by the ancient Olympic Games, which were held in Olympia, Greece, from 776 BCE to 394 CE. The Baron Pierre de Coubertin of France founded the International Olympic Committee (IOC) 1,500 years later in 1894, leading to the first modern Summer Olympic Games in Athens, Greece in 1896. The Games were held every four years from 1924 to 1936, interrupted in 1940 and 1944 by World War II, and resumed in 1948. Until 1992, the Summer Olympic Games and the Winter Olympic Games were held in the same year. A decision to change this was made in 1986, when during the 91st International Olympic Committee session, IOC members decided to alternate the Summer Olympic Games and the Winter Olympic Games on separate four-year cycles in even-numbered years. Also, at that same congress it was decided that 1992 Winter Olympics would be the last to be held in the same year as the Summer Games and that to change the rotation, the games that would be held in 1996 would be brought forward by two years, being scheduled to 1994, the same four-year cycle as the Commonwealth Games, and the men's FIFA World Cup. After those games, the next were to be held in 1998 when the four-year Olympic Cycle resumed.

The Winter Olympic Games have been hosted on three continents by thirteen countries, all of whom are located in the Northern Hemisphere. They have been held four times in the United States (1932, 1960, 1980, and 2002), three times each in France (1924, 1968, and 1992) and Italy (1956, 2006, and 2026), and twice each in Switzerland (1928 and 1948), Austria (1964 and 1976), Norway (1952 and 1994), Japan (1972 and 1998) and Canada (1988 and 2010). Also, the Winter Olympic Games have been held once each in Germany (1936), Yugoslavia (1984), Russia (2014), South Korea (2018), and China (2022).

As of 2026, twelve countries have participated in every Winter Olympic Games – Austria, Canada, Finland, France, Great Britain, Hungary, Italy, Norway, Poland, Sweden, Switzerland, and the United States. Also, Czechoslovakia participated in all Winter Olympic Games before its dissolution and its successors, Czech Republic and Slovakia have participated in all Winter Games thereafter. Six of these countries have won medals at every Winter Olympic Games – Austria, Canada, Finland, Norway, Sweden, and the United States. The only country to have won a gold medal at every Winter Olympic Games is the United States.

Norway leads the all-time medal record for the Winter Olympic Games, followed by the United States and Germany. When including defunct states, Germany (including the former countries of West Germany and East Germany) leads, followed by Norway, Russia (including the former Soviet Union) and the United States. Norway holds the record for most gold medals in any one Winter Olympics, with 18 in 2026, and overall medals, with 41 in 2026.

== History ==
=== Early years ===
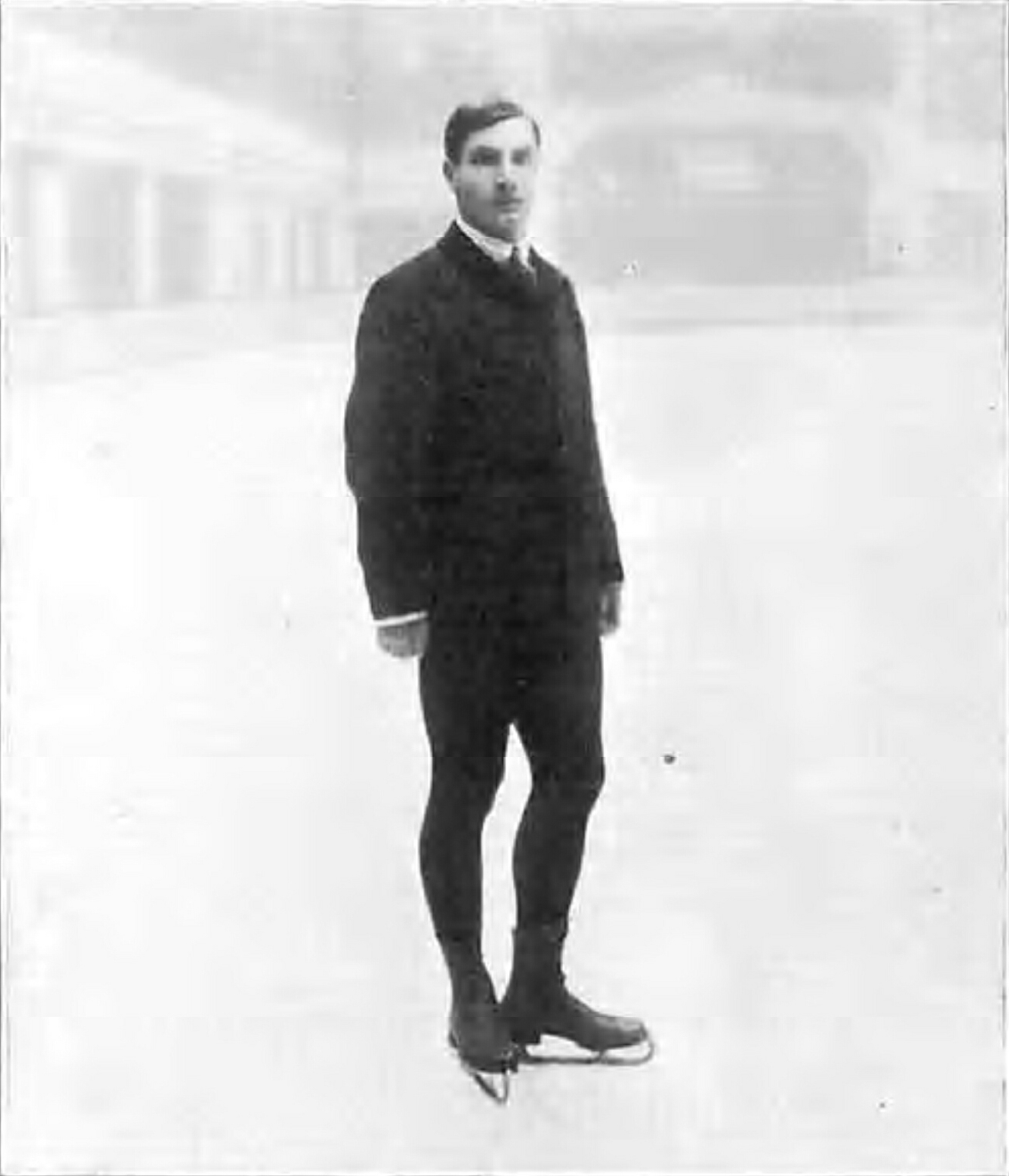
Ulrich Salchow at the 1908 Olympics

A predecessor, the Nordic Games, were organised by General Viktor Gustaf Balck in Stockholm, Sweden, in 1901 and were held again in 1903 and 1905 and then every fourth year thereafter until 1926. Balck was a charter member of the IOC and a close friend of Olympic Games founder Pierre de Coubertin. He attempted to have winter sports, specifically figure skating, added to the Olympic programme but was unsuccessful until the 1908 Summer Olympics in London. Four figure skating events were contested, at which Ulrich Salchow (10-time world champion) and Madge Syers won the individual titles.

Three years later, Italian count Eugenio Brunetta d'Usseaux proposed that the IOC stage a week of winter sports included as part of the 1912 Summer Olympics in Stockholm, Sweden. The organisers opposed this idea because they desired to protect the integrity of the Nordic Games and were concerned about a lack of facilities for winter sports.

The idea was resurrected for the 1916 Games, which were to be held in Berlin, Germany. A winter sports week with speed skating, figure skating, ice hockey and Nordic skiing were planned, but the 1916 Olympics was cancelled after the outbreak of World War I.

=== 1920 to 1936 ===
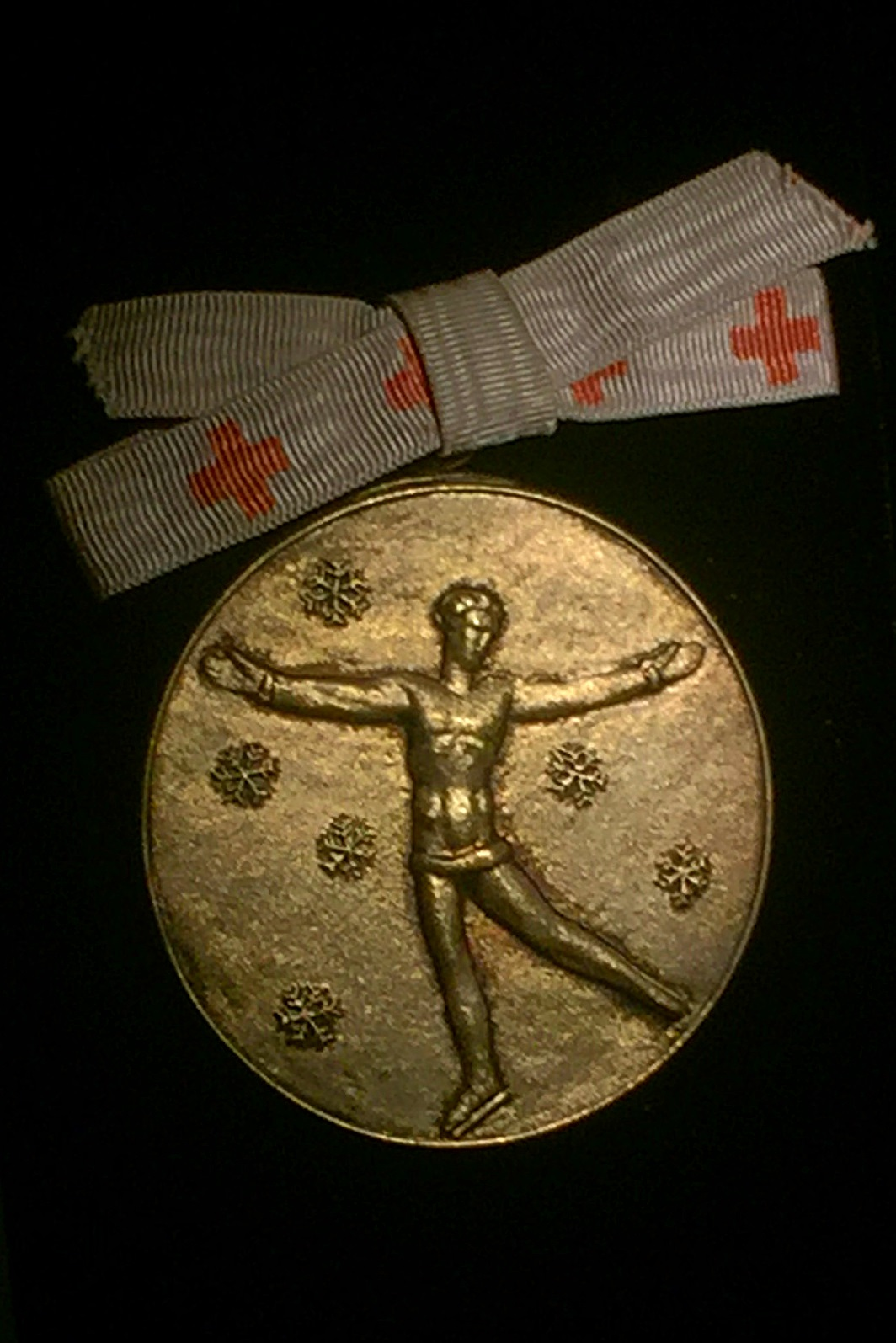
Sonia Henie's Olympic gold medal, St. Moritz 1928.

The first Olympics after the war, the 1920 Summer Olympics, were held in Antwerp, Belgium, and featured figure skating and an ice hockey tournament. Germany, Austria, Hungary, Bulgaria and Turkey were banned from competing in the games. At the IOC Congress held the following year it was decided that the host nation of the 1924 Summer Olympics, France, would host a separate "International Winter Sports Week" under the patronage of the IOC. Chamonix was chosen to host this week (actually 11 days) of events.

The 1924 games in Chamonix proved to be a success when more than 250 athletes from 16 nations competed in 16 events. Athletes from Finland and Norway won 28 medals, more than the rest of the participating nations combined. The first gold medal awarded was won by Charles Jewtraw of the United States in the 500-meter speed skate. Sonja Henie of Norway, at just 11 years old, competed in the ladies' figure skating and, although finishing last, became popular with fans. Gillis Grafström of Sweden defended his 1920 gold medal in men's figure skating, becoming the first Olympian to win gold medals in both Summer and Winter Olympics. Germany remained banned until 1925, and instead hosted a series of games called Deutsche Kampfspiele, starting with the winter edition of 1922 (which predated the first Winter Olympics). In 1925 the IOC decided to create a separate winter event and the 1924 games in Chamonix were retroactively designated as the first Winter Olympics.

St. Moritz, Switzerland, was appointed by the IOC to host the second Winter Games in 1928. Fluctuating weather conditions challenged the hosts. The opening ceremony was held in a blizzard while warm weather conditions plagued sporting events throughout the rest of the games. Because of the weather the 10,000 metre speed-skating event had to be abandoned and officially cancelled. The weather was not the only noteworthy aspect of the 1928 games: Sonja Henie of Norway returned to the Winter Olympics to make history when she won the ladies' figure skating at the age of 15. She became the youngest Olympic champion in history, a distinction she held for 70 years, and went on to defend her title at the next two Winter Olympics. Gillis Grafström won his third consecutive figure skating gold and went on to win silver in 1932, becoming the most decorated men's figure skater to date.

The next Winter Olympics, held in Lake Placid, New York, United States was the first to be hosted outside of Europe. Seventeen nations and 252 athletes participated. This was less than in 1928, as the journey to Lake Placid was too long and expensive for some European nations that encountered financial problems in the midst of the Great Depression. The athletes competed in fourteen events in four sports. Virtually no snow fell for two months before the Games, and there was not enough snow to hold all the events until mid-January. Sonja Henie defended her Olympic title, and Eddie Eagan of the United States, who had been an Olympic champion in boxing in 1920, won the gold medal in the men's bobsleigh event to join Gillis Grafström as the only athletes to have won gold medals in both the Summer and Winter Olympics. Eagan has the distinction as the only Olympian as of 2020 to accomplish this feat in different sports.

The German towns of Garmisch and Partenkirchen joined to organise the 1936 Winter Games, held from 6–16 February. This was the last time the Summer and Winter Olympics were held in the same country in the same year. Alpine skiing made its Olympic debut, but skiing teachers were barred from entering because they were considered to be professionals. Because of this decision the Swiss and Austrian skiers refused to compete at the games.

World War II interrupted the Winter Olympics. The 1940 games had been awarded to Sapporo, Japan, but the decision was rescinded in 1938 because of the Japanese invasion of China. The games were then to be held at Garmisch-Partenkirchen, Germany, but the 1940 games were cancelled following the German invasion of Poland in 1939. Due to the ongoing war, the 1944 games, originally scheduled for Cortina D'Ampezzo, Italy, were cancelled.

=== 1948 to 1962 ===
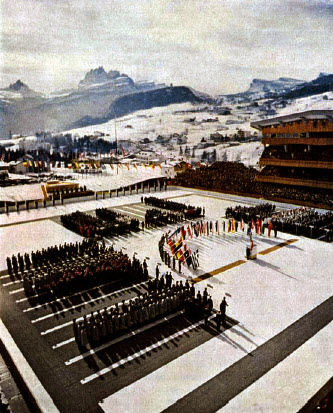
The opening ceremonies of the 1956 Winter Olympics in Cortina d'Ampezzo

St. Moritz was selected to host the first post-war games, in 1948. Switzerland's neutrality had protected the town during World War II, and most venues from the 1928 games remained in place, which made St. Moritz a logical choice. It became the first city to host a Winter Olympics twice. Twenty-eight countries competed in Switzerland, but athletes from Germany and Japan were not invited because their Olympic committees were not yet recognized. They returned in 1952. Some controversy emerged when two hockey teams from the United States arrived, both claiming to be the legitimate U.S. Olympic hockey representative. The Olympic flag presented at the 1920 Summer Olympics in Antwerp was stolen, as was its replacement. There was unprecedented parity at these games, during which 10 countries won gold medals—more than any games to that point.

The Olympic Flame tradition was introduced at the 1952 games in Oslo: the flame was lit in the fireplace of the house of 19th-century Norwegian skiing pioneer Sondre Nordheim and the first Winter torch relay was conducted by 94 torchbearers entirely on their skis. Bandy, a popular sport in the Nordic countries, was featured as a demonstration sport, though only Norway, Sweden, and Finland fielded teams. Norwegian athletes won 17 medals, which outpaced all the other nations. They were led by Hjalmar Andersen who won three gold medals in four events in the speed skating competition.

After not being able to host the games in 1944, Cortina d'Ampezzo was selected to organise the 1956 Winter Olympics. At the opening ceremonies the final torchbearer, Guido Caroli, entered the Olympic Stadium on ice skates. As he skated around the stadium his skate caught on a cable and he fell and burned his arm, nearly extinguishing the flame. He was able to recover and light the cauldron. These were the first Winter Games to be televised, and the first Olympics ever broadcast to an international audience, though no television rights were sold until the 1960 Summer Olympics in Rome. The Cortina games were used to test the feasibility of televising large sporting events.

The Soviet Union made its Olympic debut and had an immediate impact, winning more medals than any other nation. The Soviets' immediate success might be explained by the advent of the state-sponsored "full-time amateur athlete". The USSR entered teams of athletes who were all nominally students, soldiers, or working in a profession, but many of whom were in reality paid by the state to train full-time. Chiharu Igaya won the first Winter Olympics medal for Japan and the continent of Asia when he placed second in the slalom.

The IOC awarded the 1960 Olympics to Squaw Valley, United States. The announcement of its selection came as a shock as the resort near Lake Tahoe was undeveloped and unknown outside the United States. About US$80,000,000 was spent over four years to build cutting-edge infrastructure from scratch. The layout was designed to be intimate, allowing spectators and competitors to reach most of the venues on foot. The opening and closing ceremonies were the firsts produced by Walt Disney Company. The Squaw Valley Olympics was the first Winter Games to have a dedicated athletes' village, the first to use a computer (courtesy of IBM) to tabulate results, and the first to feature female speed skating events. This edition is the only one to date to not have bobsleigh competitions, as the number of countries registered in the event was insufficient and the costs of building the track were too high for the organizing committee. To replace the event, an extra edition from the FIBT World Championship was held.

=== 1964 to 1980 ===
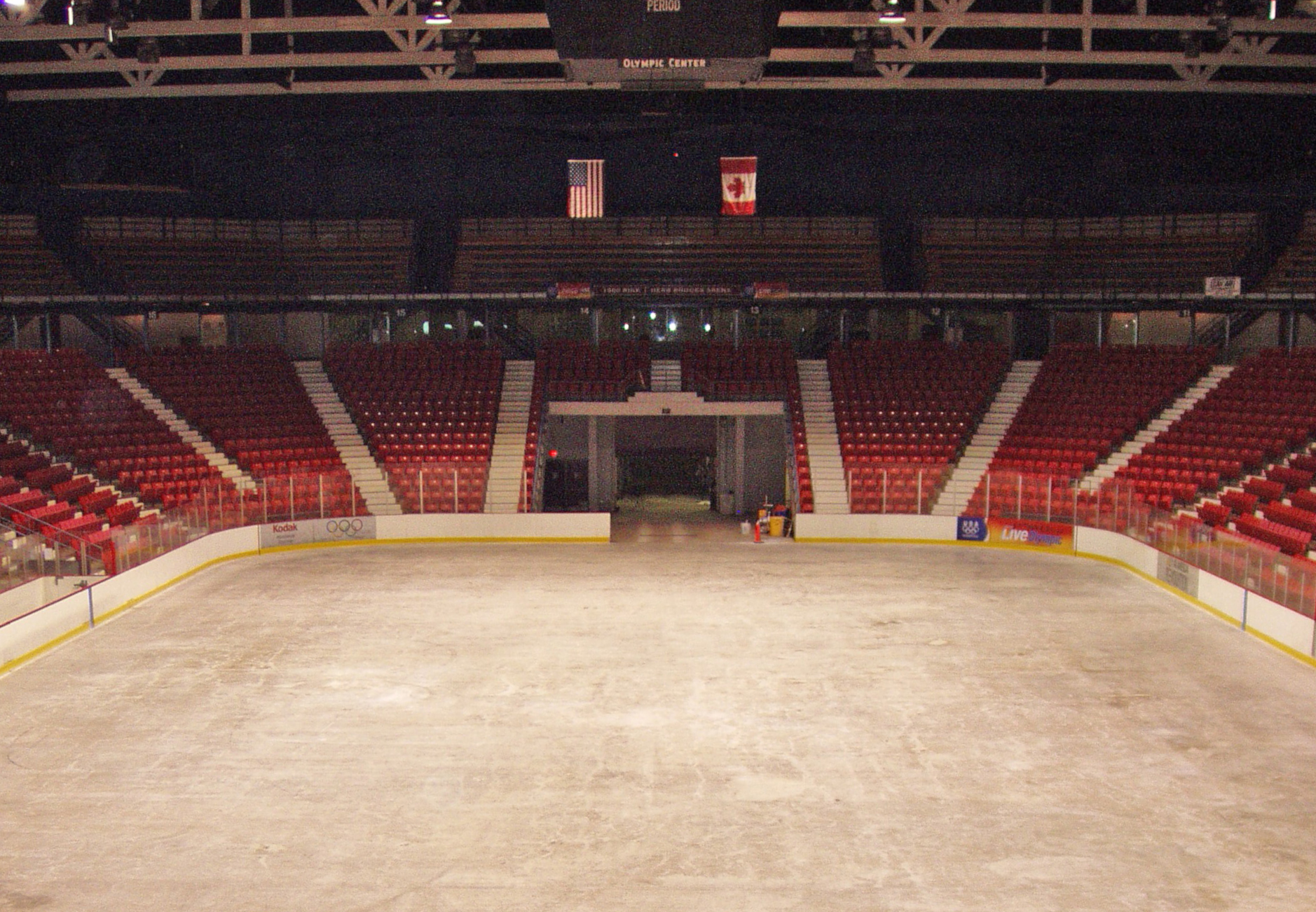
The Herb Brooks Arena in Lake Placid (c. 2007), site of the "Miracle on Ice" in 1980

The Austrian city of Innsbruck was the host in 1964. For the first time, the Olympic torch of the Winter Olympic Games was lit at the traditional ritual held in the temple of Olympia. Although Innsbruck was a traditional winter sports resort, unprojected warm weather caused a lack of snow and organisers were unable to save enough snow to be used during the Games, and the Austrian army was enlisted to transport snow and ice from other places to the sports venues. Soviet speed-skater Lidia Skoblikova made history by winning all four-speed skating events. Her career total of six gold medals set a record for Winter Olympics athletes. Also, for the first time Luge was added to the Olympic program, but the sport received bad publicity when a competitor was killed in a pre-Olympic training run.

Held in the French town of Grenoble, the 1968 Winter Olympics were the first Olympic Games to be broadcast in colour. There were 1,158 athletes from 37 nations competing in 35 events. French alpine ski racer Jean-Claude Killy became only the second person to win all the men's alpine skiing events. Due to the high interest around the world, the organising committee sold television rights for US$2 million, which was more than twice the cost of the broadcast rights for the Innsbruck Games. For the first time, the organizers chose to decentralize the Games to save costs and the events were spread across three long distances clusters, which led to the need to build three Olympic Villages. Along with the high costs, the organisers claimed that this was necessary to accommodate technological advances, however, critics disputed this, alleging that the layout would incorporate the best possible venues for television broadcasts at the athletes' expense.

The 1972 Winter Games, held in Sapporo, Japan, were the first to be hosted on a continent other than North America or Europe. The issue of professionalism was disputed during these Games when a number of alpine skiers were found to have participated in a ski camp at Mammoth Mountain in the United States; three days before the opening ceremony, IOC president Avery Brundage threatened to bar the skiers from competing in the Games as he insisted that they were no longer amateurs having benefited financially from their status as athletes. Eventually only Austrian Karl Schranz, who earned more than the other skiers, was excluded from the competition. Canada boycotted the 1972 and the 1976 ice hockey tournaments in protest at not being able to use players from professional leagues. Canadian authorities also accused the Soviet Union of using state-sponsored athletes, who were de facto professionals. Francisco Fernández Ochoa became the first and, as of 2022, the only Spaniard to win a Winter Olympic gold medal when he triumphed in the slalom.

The 1976 Winter Olympics had initially been awarded in 1970 to Denver, Colorado in the United States. These Games would have coincided with the year of Colorado's centennial and the United States Bicentennial. However, the increasing costs of the event and the oil crisis led to a local plebiscite held in November 1972, that resulted in the city withdrawing from hosting the Games, as the people of Colorado voted against public funding of the Games by a 3:2 margin. The IOC responded by offering the Games to Vancouver-Garibaldi, British Columbia in Canada, which had previously been a finalist bid for the 1976 Games. However, a change in the provincial government resulted in an administration that did not support the Olympic bid, so the IOC's offer was rejected.

Salt Lake City, previously a candidate for the 1972 Winter Olympics, then put itself forward, but a tense political situation led IOC to invite Innsbruck to host the 1976 Games, as all the infrastructure used during the 1964 Games had been maintained. Despite only having half the usual time to prepare for the Games, Innsbruck accepted the invitation to replace Denver in February 1973. During the opening ceremonies, two cauldrons were lit because it was the second time that the Austrian town had hosted the Winter Games. The 1976 Games featured the first combination bobsleigh-and-luge track, in neighbouring Igls. The Soviet Union won its fourth consecutive ice hockey gold medal.

In 1980 the Winter Olympics returned to Lake Placid, which had hosted the 1932 Games. Unlike previous editions, Lake Placid had no competitors in this bid process. Cyprus made their Olympic debut at the games. The People's Republic of China and Costa Rica, the first tropical nation, competed for the first time at the Winter Games. The Republic of China boycotted the Games, in protest of the IOC's recognition of the People's Republic of China as the only "China", and its request for the Republic of China to compete as "Chinese Taipei". The PRC, on the other hand, returned to the Olympics for the first time since 1952 and made its Winter Olympic debut.

American speed-skater Eric Heiden set either an Olympic or World record in every one of the five events in which he competed, winning a total of five individual gold medals and breaking the record for most individual golds in a single Olympics (both Summer and Winter). Hanni Wenzel won both the slalom and giant slalom and her country, Liechtenstein, became the smallest nation to produce an Olympic gold medallist. In the "Miracle on Ice", the American hockey team composed of college players beat the favoured seasoned professionals from the Soviet Union, and progressed to eventually win the gold medal. (Note: The US beat the Soviets as part of a medal round that also included Finland and Sweden, so they did not actually win the gold medal until beating Finland a few days later.)

=== 1984 to 1998 ===
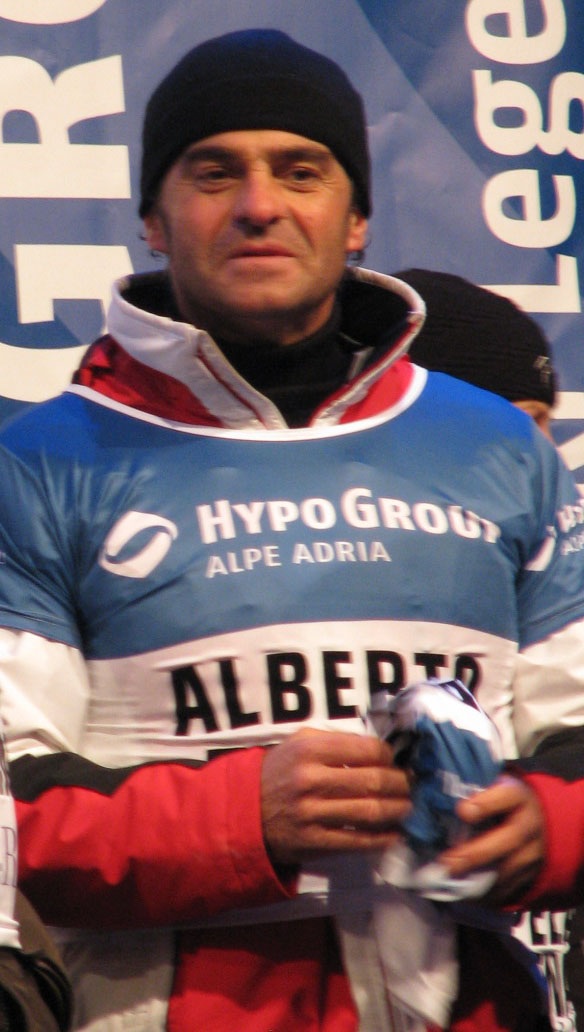
Alberto Tomba, winner of five Olympic medals in Calgary, Albertville and Lillehammer

Sapporo, Japan, and Gothenburg, Sweden, were front-runners to host the 1984 Winter Olympics. It was therefore a surprise when Sarajevo, Yugoslavia, was selected as host. The Games were well-organised and not affected by the run-up to the war that engulfed the country eight years later. A total of 49 nations and 1,272 athletes participated in 39 events. Host nation Yugoslavia won its first Olympic medal when alpine skier Jure Franko won silver in the giant slalom. Another sporting highlight was the free dance performance of British ice dancers Jayne Torvill and Christopher Dean; their Boléro routine received unanimous perfect scores for artistic impression, earning them the gold medal.

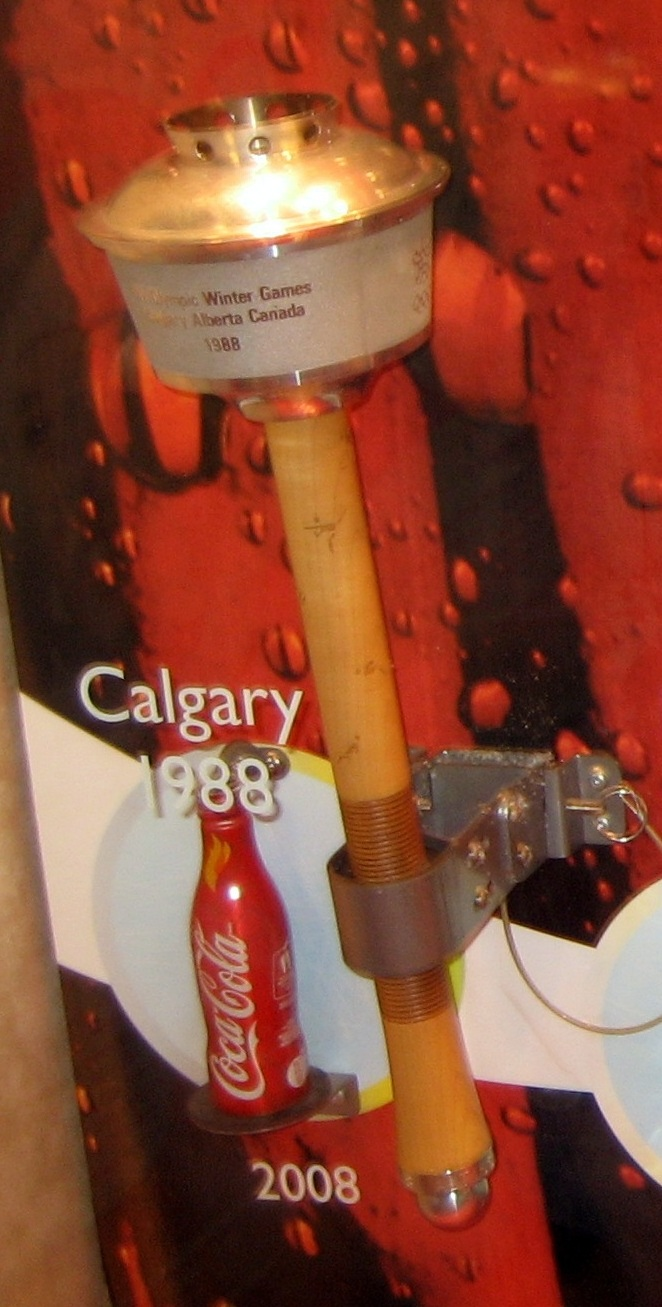
The Olympic Torch from the 1988 Winter Olympic Games in Calgary

In 1988, the Canadian city of Calgary hosted the first Winter Olympics to span three weekends, lasting for a total of 16 days. New events were added in ski-jumping and speed skating, while future Olympic sports curling, short track speed skating and freestyle skiing made their debut appearance as demonstration sports. The speed skating events were held indoors for the first time, on the Olympic Oval. Dutch skater Yvonne van Gennip won three gold medals and set two world records, beating skaters from the favoured East German team in every race.

Her medal total was equalled by Finnish ski jumper Matti Nykänen, who won all three events in his sport. Alberto Tomba, an Italian skier, made his Olympic debut by winning both the giant slalom and slalom. East German Christa Rothenburger won the women's 1,000 metre speed skating event. Seven months later she would earn a silver in track cycling at the Summer Games in Seoul, to become the only athlete to win medals in both a Summer and Winter Olympics in the same year. The 1988 games are well remembered in popular culture from two films based on its events: Cool Runnings about the Jamaican bobsled team; and Eddie the Eagle about British ski jumper Michael Edwards, who finished last but set a British record of 73.5 metres.

The 1992 Winter Games were the last to be held in the same year as the Summer Games. They were hosted in the French Savoie region, with 18 events held in the city of Albertville and the remaining events spread out over the Savoie. Political changes of the time were reflected in the composition of the Olympic teams competing in France: this was the first Games to be held after the fall of Communism and the fall of the Berlin Wall, and Germany competed as a single nation for the first time since the 1964 Games.

Former Yugoslavian republics Croatia and Slovenia made their debuts as independent nations; most of the former Soviet republics still competed as a single team known as the Unified Team, but the Baltic States made independent appearances for the first time since before World War II. At 16 years old, Finnish ski jumper Toni Nieminen made history by becoming the youngest male Winter Olympic champion. New Zealand skier Annelise Coberger became the first Winter Olympic medallist from the southern hemisphere when she won a silver medal in the women's slalom.

The 1994 Winter Olympics, held in Lillehammer, Norway, were the first Winter Games to be held in a different year from the Summer Games. This change resulted from the decision reached in the 91st IOC Session (1986) to separate the Summer and Winter Games and place them in alternating even-numbered years. This allowed the IOC to space out the logistical and financial costs of the two events from one another, and generate advertising revenue from the Games every two years instead of four. Lillehammer is the northernmost city to ever host the Winter Games. It was the second time the Games were held in Norway, after the 1952 Winter Olympics in Oslo, and the first time the Olympic Truce was observed. As a result, after the dissolution of Czechoslovakia in 1993, the Czech Republic and Slovakia made their Olympic debuts.

The women's figure skating competition drew media attention when American skater Nancy Kerrigan was injured on 6 January 1994, in an assault planned by the ex-husband of opponent Tonya Harding. Both skaters competed in the Games, but the gold medal was narrowly won by Oksana Baiul who became Ukraine's first Olympic champion, while Kerrigan won the silver medal. Johann Olav Koss of Norway won three gold medals, coming first in all of the distance speed skating events.

13-year-old Kim Yoon-Mi became the youngest-ever Olympic gold medallist when South Korea won the women's 3,000-metre speed skating relay. Bjørn Dæhli of Norway won a medal in four out of five cross-country events, becoming the most decorated Winter Olympian until then. Russia won the most events, with eleven gold medals, while Norway achieved 26 podium finishes, collecting the most medals overall on home ground. Juan Antonio Samaranch described Lillehammer as "the best Olympic Winter Games ever" in his closing ceremony speech.

The 1998 Winter Olympics were held in the Japanese city of Nagano and were the first Games to host more than 2,000 athletes. The National Hockey League allowed its players to participate in the men's ice hockey tournament for the first time, and the Czech Republic won the tournament. Women's ice hockey made its debut, and the United States won the gold medal. Bjørn Dæhlie of Norway won three gold medals in Nordic skiing, becoming the most decorated Winter Olympic athlete, with eight gold medals and twelve medals overall. Austrian Hermann Maier survived a crash during the downhill competition and returned to win gold in the super-G and the giant slalom. Tara Lipinski of the United States, aged just 15, became the youngest ever female gold medallist in an individual event when she won the Ladies' Singles, a record that had stood since Sonja Henie of Norway won the same event, also aged 15, in St. Moritz in 1928. New world records were set in speed skating largely due to the introduction of the clap skate.

=== 2002 to 2026 ===
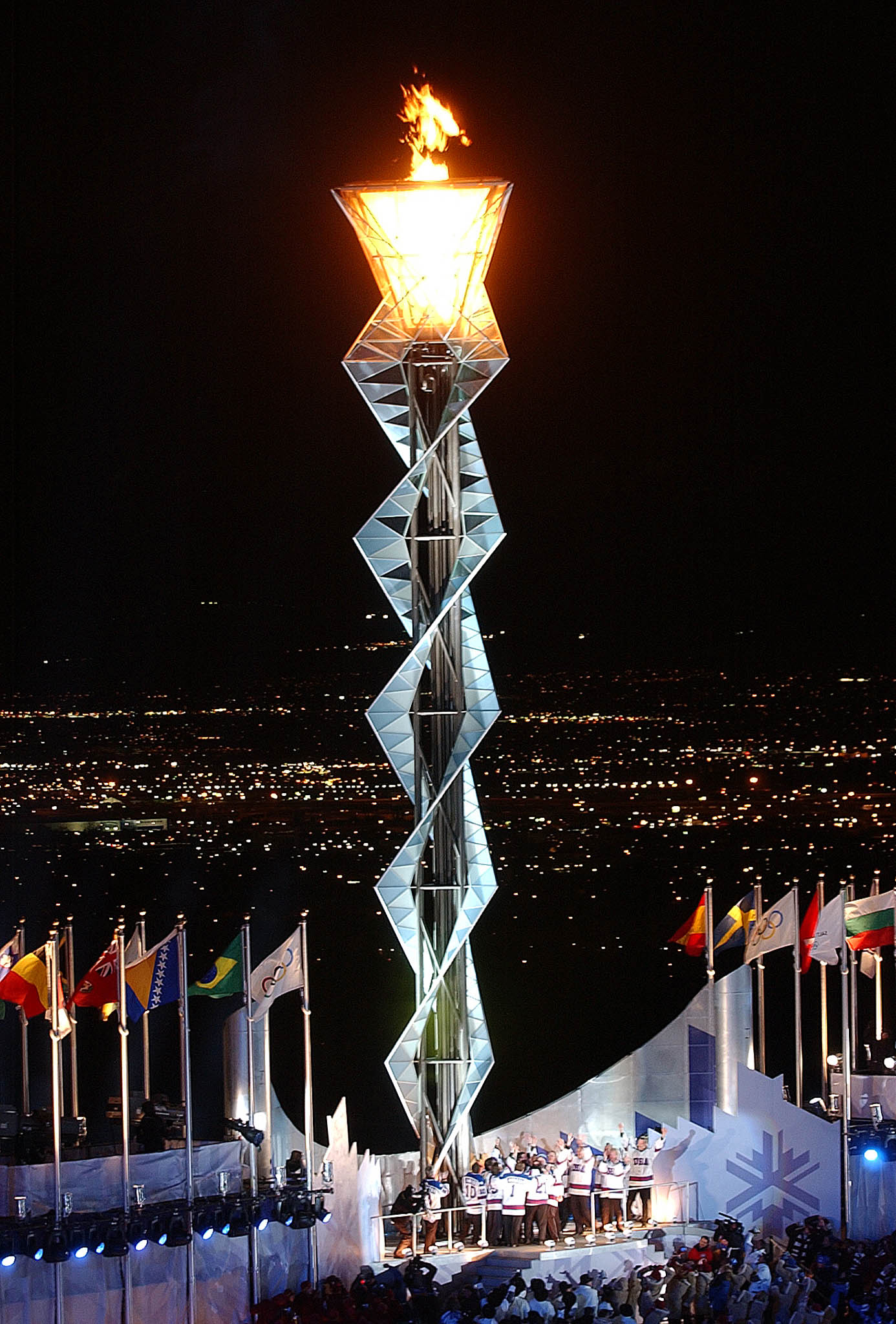
The Olympic flame during the Opening Ceremony of the 2002 Games in Salt Lake City

After a tumultuous host city process, the 2002 Winter Olympics were held in Salt Lake City, United States. 2,399 athletes from 77 National Olympic Committees participated in 78 events in 7 sports. These Games were the first to take place since the September 11 attacks of 2001, which meant a higher degree of security to avoid a terrorist attack. The opening ceremony saw signs of the aftermath of the events of that day, including the flag that flew at Ground Zero, and honour guards of NYPD and FDNY members.

Vonetta Flowers became the first Black athlete to win a gold medal in a Winter Olympics, when she along with driver Jill Bakken, won the gold medal in the two-woman bobsled event.

German Georg Hackl won a silver in the singles luge, becoming the first athlete in Olympic history to win medals in the same individual event in five consecutive Olympics. Canada achieved an unprecedented double by winning both the men's and women's ice hockey gold medals. Canada became embroiled with Russia in a controversy that involved the judging of the pairs figure skating competition. The Russian pair of Yelena Berezhnaya and Anton Sikharulidze competed against the Canadian pair of Jamie Salé and David Pelletier for the gold medal.

The Canadians appeared to have skated well enough to win the competition, yet the Russians were awarded the gold. The French judge, Marie-Reine Le Gougne, awarded the gold to the Russians. An investigation revealed that she had been pressured to give the gold to the Russian pair regardless of how they skated; in return, the Russian judge would look favourably on the French entrants in the ice dancing competition.

The IOC decided to award both pairs the gold medal in a second medal ceremony held later in the Games. Australian Steven Bradbury became the first gold medallist from the southern hemisphere when he won the 1,000 metre short-track speed skating event.

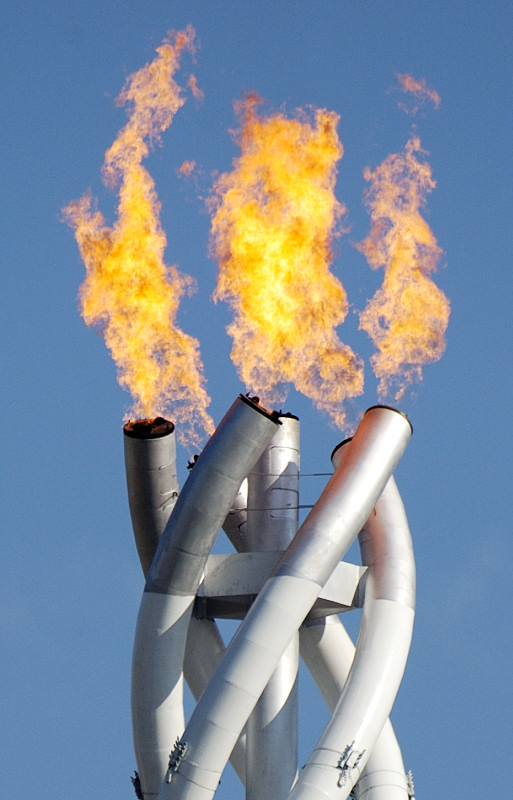
A close-up of the Olympic Flame during the 2006 Winter Olympics in Turin

The Italian city of Turin hosted the 2006 Winter Olympics. It was the second time that Italy had hosted the Winter Olympic Games. South Korean athletes won 10 medals, including 6 gold in the short-track speed skating events. Sun-Yu Jin won three gold medals while her teammate Hyun-Soo Ahn won three gold medals and a bronze. In the women's Cross-Country team pursuit Canadian Sara Renner broke one of her poles and, when he saw her dilemma, Norwegian coach Bjørnar Håkensmoen decided to lend her a pole. In so doing she was able to help her team win a silver medal in the event at the expense of the Norwegian team, who finished fourth.

On winning the Super-G, Kjetil-Andre Aamodt of Norway became the most decorated ski racer of all time with 4 gold and 8 overall medals. He is also the only ski racer to have won the same event at three Olympics, winning the Super-G in 1992, 2002, and 2006. Claudia Pechstein of Germany became the first speed skater to earn nine career medals.

In February 2009, Pechstein tested positive for "blood manipulation" and received a two-year suspension, which she appealed. The Court of Arbitration for Sport upheld her suspension but a Swiss court ruled that she could compete for a spot on the 2010 German Olympic team. This ruling was brought to the Swiss Federal Tribunal, which overturned the lower court's ruling and precluded her from competing in Vancouver.

In 2003, the IOC awarded the 2010 Winter Olympics to Vancouver, thus allowing Canada to host its second Winter Olympics. With a population of more than 2.5 million people Vancouver is the largest metropolitan area to ever host a Winter Olympic Games. Over 2,500 athletes from 82 countries participated in 86 events. The death of Georgian luger Nodar Kumaritashvili in a training run on the day of the opening ceremonies resulted in the Whistler Sliding Centre changing the track layout on safety grounds.

Norwegian cross-country skier Marit Bjørgen won five medals in the six cross-country events on the women's programme. She finished the Olympics with three golds, a silver and a bronze. For the first time, Canada won a gold medal at an Olympic Games it hosted, having failed to do so at both the 1976 Summer Olympics in Montreal and the 1988 Winter Olympics in Calgary. In contrast to the lack of gold medals at these previous Olympics, the Canadian team finished first overall in gold medal wins, and became the first host nation—since Norway in 1952—to lead the gold medal count, with 14 medals. In doing so, it also broke the record for the most gold medals won by a NOC at a single Winter Olympics (the previous was 13, set by the Soviet Union in 1976 and matched by Norway in 2002).

The Vancouver Games were notable for the poor performance of the Russian athletes. From their first Winter Olympics in 1956 to the 2006 Games, a Soviet or Russian delegation had never been outside the top five medal-winning nations, but in 2010 they finished sixth in total medals and eleventh in gold medals. President Dmitry Medvedev called for the resignation of top sports officials immediately after the Games. Russia's disappointing performance at Vancouver is cited as the reason behind the enhancement of an already existing doping scheme alleged to have been in operation at major events such as the 2014 Games at Sochi.

The success of Asian countries stood in stark contrast to the under-performing Russian team, with Vancouver marking a high point for medals won by Asian countries. At the Albertville Games in 1992 the Asian countries had won fifteen medals, three of which were gold. In Vancouver, the total number of medals won by athletes from Asia had increased to thirty-one, with eleven of them being gold. The rise of Asian nations in Winter Olympics sports is due in part to the growth of winter sports programmes and the interest in winter sports in nations such as Kazakhstan, South Korea, Japan and China. These results increased the chances of an Asian city hosting the 2018 Winter Olympics that would be held the following year.

Sochi, Russia, was selected as the host city for the 2014 Winter Olympics over Salzburg, Austria, and Pyeongchang, South Korea. This was the first time that Russia had hosted a Winter Olympics. The Games took place from 7 to 23 February 2014. A record 2,800 athletes from 88 countries competed in 98 events. The Olympic Village and Olympic Stadium were located on the Black Sea coast. All of the mountain venues were 50 kilometres (31 mi) away in the alpine region known as Krasnaya Polyana. The Games were the most expensive until the date, with a cost of £30 billion (US$51 billion).

On the snow, Norwegian biathlete Ole Einar Bjørndalen took two golds to bring his total tally of Olympic medals to 13, overtaking his compatriot Bjørn Dæhlie to become the most decorated Winter Olympian of all time. Another Norwegian, cross-country skier Marit Bjørgen took three golds; her total of ten Olympic medals tied her as the female Winter Olympian with most medals, alongside Raisa Smetanina and Stefania Belmondo. Snowboarder Ayumu Hirano became the youngest medallist on snow at the Winter Games when he took a silver in the halfpipe competition at the age of fifteen.

On the ice, the Netherlands team dominated the speed skating events, taking 23 medals, four clean sweeps of the podium places and at least one medal in each of the twelve medal events. Ireen Wüst was their most successful competitor, taking two golds and three silvers. In figure skating, Yuzuru Hanyu became the first skater to break the 100-point barrier in the short programme on the way to winning the gold medal. Among the sledding disciplines, luger Armin Zöggeler took a bronze, becoming the first Winter Olympian to secure a medal in six consecutive Games.

Following their disappointing performance at the 2010 Games, and an investment of £600 million in elite sport, Russia initially topped the medal table, taking 13 gold and 33 total medals. However, Grigory Rodchenkov, the former head of the Russian national anti-doping laboratory, subsequently claimed that he had been involved in doping dozens of Russian competitors for the Games, and that he had been assisted by the Russian Federal Security Service in opening and re-sealing bottles containing urine samples so that samples with banned substances could be replaced with "clean" urine.

A subsequent investigation commissioned by the World Anti-Doping Agency led by Richard McLaren concluded that a state-sponsored doping programme had operated in Russia from "at least late 2011 to 2015" across the "vast majority" of Summer and Winter Olympic sports. On 5 December 2017, the IOC announced that Russia would compete as the Olympic Athletes from Russia at the 2018 Winter Olympics and by the end of 2017 the IOC Disciplinary Commission had disqualified 43 Russian athletes, stripping thirteen medals and knocking Russia from the top of the medal table, thus putting Norway in the lead. However, nine medals were later returned, meaning that Russia reclaimed first place in the overall medal table, and joint first place with Norway in terms of gold medals.

On 6 July 2011, Pyeongchang, South Korea, was selected to host the 2018 Winter Olympics over Munich, Germany, and Annecy, France. This was the first time that South Korea had been selected to host a Winter Olympics and it was the second time the Olympics were held in the country overall, after the 1988 Summer Olympics in Seoul. The Games took place from 9 to 25 February 2018. More than 2,900 athletes from 92 countries participated in 102 events. The main venue cluster was the Alpensia Resort in Daegwallyeong-myeon, while the ice events are held at Gangneung Olympic Park in Pyeongchang's neighbouring sea-city of Gangneung.

The lead-up to the 2018 Winter Olympics was affected by the tensions between North and South Korea and the ongoing Russian doping scandal. Despite tense relations, North Korea agreed to participate in the Games, enter with South Korea during the opening ceremony as a unified Korea, and field a unified team in women's ice hockey. Russian athletes, who complied with the IOC's doping regulations, were given the option to compete in Pyeongchang as "Olympic Athletes from Russia" (OAR).

The Games saw the addition of big air snowboarding, mass start speed skating, mixed doubles curling, and mixed team alpine skiing to the programme. Like four years early, the Netherlands again dominated speed skating, winning gold medals in seven of the ten individual events. Dutch speed skater Sven Kramer won gold in the men's 5000m event, becoming the only male speed skater to win the same Olympic event three times. On the snow, Norway led the medal tally in cross-country skiing, with Marit Bjørgen winning bronze in the women's team sprint and gold in the 30-kilometre classical event, bringing her total Olympic medal haul to fifteen, the most won by any athlete (male or female) in Winter Olympics history.

Johannes Høsflot Klæbo of Norway became the youngest ever male to win an Olympic gold in cross-country skiing when he won the men's sprint at age 21. He was also part of the Norwegian cross-country team winning the men’s relay and team sprint events. Noriaki Kasai of Japan became the first athlete in history to participate in eight Winter Olympics when he took part in the ski jumping qualification the day before the opening of the Games. Ester Ledecká of the Czech Republic won gold in the skiing super-G event and another gold in the snowboarding parallel giant slalom, making her the first female athlete to win Olympic gold medals in two sports at a single Winter Games.

Norway led the total medal standings with 39, the highest number of medals by a nation in any Winter Olympics, followed by Germany's 31 and Canada's 29. Host nation South Korea won seventeen medals, five of them gold, its highest medal haul at a Winter Olympics.

Beijing, the capital of the People's Republic of China, was elected as the host city for the 2022 Winter Olympics on 31 July 2015 at the 128th IOC Session. Beijing became the first city ever to have hosted both the Summer and Winter Olympics. Like the Summer Olympics held six months earlier in Tokyo, the COVID-19 pandemic resulted in the implementation of strict health and safety protocols, including restrictions on public attendance at the Games. The Games included a record 109 events over 15 disciplines in seven sports with seven new medal events, including mixed team competitions in freestyle skiing aerials, ski jumping, and snowboard cross. The Games were held between 4 and 20 February 2022 at venues in Beijing and Zhangjiakou which for the first time were run entirely on renewable energy. Several of the events were impacted by temperatures as low as minus 20 Celsius and strong wind.

The first gold medal of the Games was won by Therese Johaug of Norway in the women's skiathlon. Johaug had been excluded from the 2018 Winter Olympics in a controversial decision after having used a banned cream for sunburned lips. She went on to also win the women's 10 km and 30 km cross-country distances. Johannes Klæbo continued his dominance of the men’s cross-country sprint events by winning gold in the individual and team events. In the women's snowboard cross, Lindsey Jacobellis of the United States won the gold, having lost the gold 16 years earlier at the 2006 Winter Olympics in Torino due to a brutal fall. On the ice, the Netherlands dominated with a total of six gold medals and Irene Schouten winning the women's mass start, 3,000m and 5,000m distances. Nils van der Poel of Sweden won the men's 5,000m and 10,000m distances, setting new Olympic records in both distances. Kamila Valieva of Russia was allowed to compete in the women's figure skating despite a failed doping test in December 2021. She failed, however, to win an individual medal after falling in her final routine. Russia's team gold medal remained in limbo for two years, pending investigation into Valieva's positive drug test, before the Court of Arbitration for Sport (CAS) disqualified Valieva for four years retroactive to 25 December 2021, leading the ISU to re-allocate the medals, upgrading the United States to gold and Japan to silver while downgrading the ROC to bronze. Finland claimed its first ice hockey gold, having beaten the Russian Olympic Committee in the men's final on the last day of the Games.

Norway was first in the overall medal standings, claiming 37 medals in total and 16 gold medals, the highest number of gold medals of any country in a single Winter Olympics. This was the tenth time Norway claimed the highest number of gold medals at the Winter Games.

=== Future ===
The amount by which greenhouse gas emissions are reduced is forecast to substantially affect the number of Winter Olympic Game venues that will have reliably snowy conditions.

Though Europe and North America have the most potential venues (areas of rectangles in chart), a higher portion of those venues are projected to be climatically unreliable because of global warming (height of columns).

The 2026 Winter Olympics was held in Milan-Cortina d'Ampezzo, Italy, and took place from 6 to 22 February 2026. At the 142nd IOC Session in July 2024, it was confirmed that the 2030 Winter Olympics will be hosted by France in the French Alps. Alpes 2030 will be the first Winter Olympics in history to reach full gender parity on the field of play, with equal numbers of male and female athletes. The 2034 Winter Olympics was also awarded to be hosted by the United States in Utah; the state previously hosted the 2002 Olympics in Salt Lake City.

=== Bribery scandal ===
Juan Antonio Samaranch, former IOC president, who was in charge of the Olympic movement for more than 20 years

The process for awarding host city honours came under intense scrutiny after Salt Lake City was awarded the right to host the 2002 Games. Soon after the host city had been announced it was discovered that the organisers had engaged in an elaborate bribery scheme to curry favour with IOC officials. Gifts and other financial considerations were given to those who would evaluate and vote on Salt Lake City's bid. These gifts included medical treatment for relatives, a college scholarship for one member's son and a land deal in Utah. IOC president Juan Antonio Samaranch received two rifles valued at $2,000. He defended the gift as inconsequential since, as president, he was a non-voting member.

The subsequent United States Department of Justice investigation uncovered inconsistencies in the bids for every Olympics (both Summer and Winter) since 1988. For example, the gifts received by IOC members from the Japanese Organising Committee for Nagano's bid for the 1998 Winter Olympics were described by the investigation committee as "astronomical". Although nothing strictly illegal had been done, the IOC feared that corporate sponsors would lose faith in the integrity of the process and that the Olympic brand would be tarnished to such an extent that advertisers would begin to pull their support.

The investigation resulted in the expulsion of 10 IOC members and the sanctioning of another 10. New terms and age limits were established for IOC membership, and 15 former Olympic athletes were added to the committee. Stricter rules for future bids were imposed, with ceilings imposed on the value of gifts IOC members could accept from bid cities.

=== Host city legacy ===
About eight years before each Winter Olympics, the IOC invites National Olympic Committees to submit bids to host the games. According to the IOC, the host city for the Winter Olympics is responsible for "...establishing functions and services for all aspects of the Games, such as sports planning, venues, finance, technology, accommodation, catering, media services, etc., as well as operations during the Games". Due to the cost of hosting the Games, most host cities never realise a profit on their investment. For example, the 2006 Winter Olympics in Turin, Italy, cost $3.6 billion to host. By comparison, the 1998 Winter Olympics in Nagano, Japan, cost $12.5 billion. The organisers of the Nagano Games claimed that the cost of extending the bullet train service from Tokyo to Nagano was responsible for the large price tag.

The organising committee had hoped that the exposure gained from hosting the Winter Olympics, and the improved access to Nagano from Tokyo, would benefit the local economy for years afterwards. In fact, Nagano's economy did experience a post-Olympic boom for a year or two, but the long-term effects have not materialised as anticipated. The likelihood of heavy debt is a deterrent to prospective host cities, as well as the prospect of unused sports venues and infrastructure saddling the local community with upkeep costs with no appreciable post-Olympic value.

The Winter Olympics has the added problem of the alpine events requiring a mountain location; the men's downhill needs an 800-metre altitude difference along a suitable course. As this is a focal event that is central to the Games, the IOC has previously not agreed to it taking place a long way from the main host city, in contrast to the Summer Games, where sailing and horse sports have taken place more than 1,000 kilometres (620 mi) away. The requirement for a mountain location also means that venues such as hockey arenas often have to be built in sparsely populated areas with little future need for a large arena and for the hotels and infrastructure needed for all Olympic visitors. Due to cost issues, fewer and fewer cities are willing to host. Both the Torino 2006 and Vancouver 2010 Games, which were hosted in countries where large cities are located close to suitable mountain regions, had lower costs since more venues, hotels and transport infrastructure already existed. In contrast, the Sochi 2014 games had large costs as most installations had to be built.

The IOC has tried to mitigate these concerns. Firstly, it has agreed to fund part of the host city's budget. Secondly, the qualifying host countries are limited to those that have the resources and infrastructure to successfully host an Olympic Games without negatively impacting their region or nation; this rules out a large portion of the developing world. Finally, any prospective host city is required to add a "legacy plan" to their proposal, with a view to the long-term economic and environmental impact that hosting the Olympics will have.

Beginning with the 2022 Winter Games, the IOC allowed greater distances between the alpine events and other events. The Oslo bid had 220 kilometres (140 mi) to the Kvitfjell downhill arena, while eventual host Beijing had venues 220 km away from the city as well. For the 2026 Winter Games, Stockholm's unsuccessful bid proposed to hold the alpine event in Åre, 620 kilometres (390 mi) away by road, while the successful bid of 2026 has 410 kilometres (250 mi) between Milan and Cortina.

=== Doping ===
In 1967 the IOC began enacting drug testing protocols. They started by randomly testing athletes at the 1968 Winter Olympics. The first Winter Games athlete to test positive for a banned substance was Alois Schloder, a West German hockey player, but his team was still allowed to compete. During the 1970s, testing outside of competition was escalated because it was found to deter athletes from using performance-enhancing drugs. The problem with testing during this time was a lack of standardisation of the test procedures, which undermined the credibility of the tests. It was not until the late 1980s that international sporting federations began to coordinate efforts to standardise the drug-testing protocols. The IOC took the lead in the fight against steroids when it established the independent World Anti-Doping Agency (WADA) in November 1999.

The 2006 Winter Olympics in Turin became notable for a scandal involving the emerging trend of blood doping, the use of blood transfusions or synthetic hormones such as Erythropoietin (EPO) to improve oxygen flow and thus reduce fatigue. The Italian police conducted a raid on the Austrian cross-country ski team's residence during the Games where they seized blood-doping specimens and equipment. This event followed the pre-Olympics suspension of 12 cross-country skiers who tested positive for unusually high levels of haemoglobin, which is evidence of blood doping.

The 2014 Winter Olympics in Sochi's Russian Doping Scandal has resulted in the International Olympic Committee to begin disciplinary proceedings against 28 (later increased to 46) Russian athletes who competed at the 2014 Winter Games in Sochi, Russia, acting on evidence that their urine samples were tampered with.

=== Cold War ===
The Winter Olympics were an ideological front in the Cold War since the Soviet Union first participated at the 1956 Winter Games. It did not take long for the Cold War combatants to discover what a powerful propaganda tool the Olympic Games could be. The advent of the state-sponsored "full-time amateur athlete" of the Eastern Bloc countries further eroded the ideology of the pure amateur, as it put the self-financed amateurs of the Western countries at a disadvantage. The Soviet Union entered teams of athletes who were all nominally students, soldiers, or working in a profession, but many of whom were in reality paid by the state to train on a full-time basis. Nevertheless, the IOC held to the traditional rules regarding amateurism until the '90s.

The Cold War created tensions amongst countries allied to the two superpowers. The strained relationship between East and West Germany created a difficult political situation for the IOC. Because of its role in World War II, Germany was not allowed to compete at the 1948 Winter Olympics. In 1950, the IOC recognised the West German Olympic Committee, and invited East and West Germany to compete as a unified team at the 1952 Winter Games. East Germany declined and instead sought international legitimacy separate from West Germany.

In 1955, the Soviet Union recognised East Germany as a sovereign state, thereby giving more credibility to East Germany's campaign to become an independent participant. The IOC agreed provisionally to accept the East German National Olympic Committee on condition that East and West Germans compete as one team. The situation became tense when the Berlin Wall was constructed by East Germany in 1961 to stop migration of its citizens and Western European nations began refusing visas to East German athletes. The uneasy compromise of a unified team held until the 1968 Grenoble Games when the IOC split the teams and threatened to reject host-city bids from any country that refused entry visas to East German athletes.

=== Boycott ===
The Winter Games have had only one national team boycott when Taiwan decided not to participate in the 1980 Winter Olympics held in Lake Placid. Prior to the Games, the IOC agreed to allow China to compete in the Olympics for the first time since 1952. China was given permission to compete as the "People's Republic of China" (PRC) and to use the PRC flag and anthem. Until 1980 the island of Taiwan had been competing under the name "Republic of China" (ROC) and had been using the ROC flag and anthem. The IOC attempted to have the countries compete together but when this proved to be unacceptable the IOC demanded that Taiwan cease to call itself the "Republic of China".

The IOC renamed the island "Chinese Taipei" and demanded that it adopt a different flag and national anthem, stipulations to which Taiwan would not agree. Despite numerous appeals and court hearings, the IOC's decision stood. When the Taiwanese athletes arrived at the Olympic village with their Republic of China identification cards they were not admitted. They subsequently left the Olympics in protest, just before the opening ceremonies. Taiwan returned to Olympic competition at the 1984 Winter Games in Sarajevo as Chinese Taipei. The country agreed to compete under a flag bearing the emblem of their National Olympic Committee and to play the anthem of their National Olympic Committee should one of their athletes win a gold medal. The agreement remains in place to this day.

== Sports ==
The Olympic Charter limits winter sports to "those sports which are practised on snow or ice". Since 1992 a number of new disciplines have been added to the Olympic programme, which include short-track speed skating, snowboarding and freestyle skiing. The addition of these events has broadened the appeal of the Winter Olympics beyond Europe and North America. While European powers such as Norway and Germany still dominate the traditional Winter Olympic sports, countries such as South Korea, Australia and Canada are finding success in these new sports. The results are more parity in the national medal tables, more interest in the Winter Olympics, and higher global television ratings.

=== Current sports ===
Discipline	Years	Events	Events list
Alpine skiing	Since 1936	10	Men's: downhill, super G, giant slalom, slalom, alpine combined. Women's: downhill, super G, giant slalom, slalom, alpine combined. Mixed parallel slalom.
Biathlon	Since 1960	11	Men's: sprint 10 km, individual 20 km, pursuit 12.5 km, mass start 15 km, relay 4×7.5 km. Women's: sprint 7.5 km, individual 15 km, pursuit 10 km, mass start 12.5 km, relay 4×6 km. Mixed relay 4×6 km.
Bobsleigh	1924–1956, since 1964	4	Men's: four-man race, two-man race. Women's: two-woman race, monobob race.
Cross-country skiing	Since 1924	12	Men's: sprint, team sprint, 15 km, 30 km skiathlon, 50 km mass start, 4×10 km relay. Women's: sprint, team sprint, 10 km, 15 km skiathlon, 30 km mass start, 4×5 km relay.
Curling	1924, since 1998	3	Men's, women's and mixed doubles tournaments.
Figure skating	Since 1924 (Note: Figure skating events were held at the 1908 and 1920 Summer Olympics.)	5	Men's singles. Women's singles. Pairs. Ice dancing. Team event.
Freestyle skiing	Since 1992	15	Men's: aerials, moguls, ski cross, halfpipe, big air, slopestyle. Women's: aerials, moguls, ski cross, halfpipe, big air, slopestyle. Mixed aerials.
Ice hockey	Since 1924 (Note: A men's ice hockey tournament was held at the 1920 Summer Olympics.)	2	Men's and women's tournaments.
Luge	Since 1964	5	Men's singles, Women's singles, Men's doubles, Women's doubles, mixed team relay.
Nordic combined	Since 1924	3	Men's 10 km individual normal hill, 10 km individual large hill, team 4×5 km large hill.
Short track speed skating	Since 1992	9	Men's: 500 m, 1000 m, 1500 m, 5000 m relay. Women's: 500 m, 1000 m, 1500 m, 3000 m relay. Mixed 2000 m relay.
Skeleton	1928, 1948, Since 2002	3	Men's and women's events.
Ski jumping	Since 1924	6	Men's: individual normal hill, individual large hill, team large hill. Women's: individual normal hill. Mixed team normal hill.
Ski mountaineering	Since 2026 (Note: Optional Sport at the 2026 Winter Olympics.)	3	Men's sprint. Women's sprint. Mixed relay.
Snowboarding	Since 1998	11	Men's: snowboard cross, parallel, half-pipe, slopestyle, big air. Women's: snowboard cross, parallel, half-pipe, slopestyle, big air. Mixed snowboard cross.
Speed skating	Since 1924	14	Men's: 500 m, 1000 m, 1500 m, 5000 m, 10,000 m, mass start, team pursuit. Women's: 500 m, 1000 m, 1500 m, 3000 m, 5000 m, mass start, team pursuit.

=== Demonstration events ===
Demonstration sports have historically provided a venue for host countries to attract publicity to locally popular sports by having a competition without granting medals. Demonstration sports were discontinued after 1992. Military patrol, a precursor to the biathlon, was a medal sport in 1924 and was demonstrated in 1928, 1936 and 1948, becoming an official sport in 1960. The special figures figure skating event was only contested at the 1908 Summer Olympics. Bandy (Russian hockey) is a sport popular in the Nordic countries and Russia. In the latter it is considered a national sport. It was demonstrated at the Oslo Games.

Ice stock sport, a German variant of curling, was demonstrated in 1936 in Germany and 1964 in Austria. The ski ballet event, later known as ski-acro, was demonstrated in 1988 and 1992. Skijöring, skiing behind dogs, was a demonstration sport in St. Moritz in 1928. A sled-dog race was held at Lake Placid in 1932. Speed skiing was demonstrated in Albertville at the 1992 Winter Olympics. Winter pentathlon, a variant of the modern pentathlon, was included as a demonstration event at the 1948 Games in Switzerland. It included cross-country skiing, shooting, downhill skiing, fencing, and horse riding.

== All-time medal table ==
The table below uses official data provided by the IOC:

Defunct nation

Accurate as of 2026 Winter Olympics

No.	Nation	Gold	Silver	Bronze	Total	Games
1	Norway	166	146	135	447	25
2	United States	126	133	104	363	25
3	Germany	113	107	73	293	14
4	Canada	82	79	85	246	25
5	Soviet Union	78	57	59	194	9
6	Austria	76	97	96	269	25
7	Sweden	73	57	65	195	25
8	Switzerland	69	56	66	191	25
9	Netherlands	63	56	48	167	23
10	Italy	52	49	70	171	25
11	France	50	50	61	161	25
12	Finland	45	66	70	181	25
13	Russia	45	39	34	118	6
14	East Germany	39	36	35	110	6
15	South Korea	36	34	19	89	20
16	China	27	36	29	92	13
17	Japan	22	36	42	100	23
18	Great Britain	15	6	18	39	25
19	Czech Republic	12	13	14	39	9
20	West Germany	11	15	13	39	6

=== Medal leaders by year ===
Winter Olympics medal table leaders by year
- 1924: Norway
- 1928: Norway
- 1932: United States
- 1936: Norway
- 1948: Norway and Sweden
- 1952: Norway
- 1956: Soviet Union
- 1960: Soviet Union
- 1964: Soviet Union
- 1968: Norway
- 1972: Soviet Union
- 1976: Soviet Union
- 1980: Soviet Union
- 1984: East Germany
- 1988: Soviet Union
- 1992: Germany
- 1994: Russia
- 1998: Germany
- 2002: Norway
- 2006: Germany
- 2010: Canada
- 2014: Norway
- 2018: Norway
- 2022: Norway
- 2026: Norway

Number of occurrences

Rank	Country	Number of games
1	Norway	11 times
2	Soviet Union	7 times
3	Germany	3 times
4	United States	1 time
4	Sweden	1 time
4	East Germany	1 time
4	Canada	1 time
4	Russia	1 time

== List of Winter Olympic Games ==
Year	No.	Host city	Host country	Games dates / Opened by	Sports (Disciplines)	Competitors			Events	Nations	Top nation
Year	No.	Host city	Host country	Games dates / Opened by	Sports (Disciplines)	Total	Men	Women	Events	Nations	Top nation
1924	I	Chamonix	France	25 January – 5 February 1924; Undersecretary of State Gaston Vidal	6 (9)	258	247	11	16	16	Norway
1928	II	St. Moritz	Switzerland	11–19 February 1928; President Edmund Schulthess (Note: This office is technically not head of state in and of itself, but is the presiding officer of the Federal Council which collectively acts as head of state.)	4 (8)	464	438	26	14	25	Norway
1932	III	Lake Placid	United States	4–15 February 1932; Governor Franklin D. Roosevelt	4 (7)	252	231	21	14	17	United States
1936	IV	Garmisch-Partenkirchen	Germany	6–16 February 1936; Chancellor Adolf Hitler	4 (8)	646	566	80	17	28	Norway
1940	(Note: Unlike the Summer Olympics, the cancelled 1940 Winter Olympics and 1944 Winter Olympics are not included in the official Roman numeral counts for the Winter Games. While the official titles of the Summer Games count Olympiads, the titles of the Winter Games only count the Games themselves.)	Sapporo; Garmisch-Partenkirchen	Japan; Germany	Originally awarded to Japan, then awarded to Germany. Cancelled due to World War II							
1944		Cortina d'Ampezzo	Italy	Cancelled due to World War II							
1948	V	St. Moritz	Switzerland	30 January – 8 February 1948; President Enrico Celio	4 (9)	669	592	77	22	28	Norway; Sweden
1952	VI	Oslo	Norway	14–25 February 1952; Princess Ragnhild	4 (8)	694	585	109	22	30	Norway
1956	VII	Cortina d'Ampezzo	Italy	26 January – 5 February 1956; President Giovanni Gronchi	4 (8)	821	687	134	24	32	Soviet Union
1960	VIII	Squaw Valley	United States	18–28 February 1960; Vice President Richard Nixon	4 (8)	665	521	144	27	30	Soviet Union
1964	IX	Innsbruck	Austria	29 January – 9 February 1964; President Adolf Schärf	6 (10)	1,091	892	199	34	36	Soviet Union
1968	X	Grenoble	France	6–18 February 1968; President Charles de Gaulle	6 (10)	1,158	947	211	35	37	Norway
1972	XI	Sapporo	Japan	3–13 February 1972; Emperor Hirohito	6 (10)	1,006	801	205	35	35	Soviet Union
1976	XII	Innsbruck	Austria	4–15 February 1976; President Rudolf Kirchschläger	6 (10)	1,123	892	231	37	37	Soviet Union
1980	XIII	Lake Placid	United States	13–24 February 1980; Vice President Walter Mondale	6 (10)	1,072	840	232	38	37	Soviet Union
1984	XIV	Sarajevo	Yugoslavia	8–19 February 1984; President Mika Špiljak	6 (10)	1,272	998	274	39	49	East Germany
1988	XV	Calgary	Canada	13–28 February 1988; Governor General Jeanne Sauvé	6 (10)	1,423	1,122	301	46	57	Soviet Union
1992	XVI	Albertville	France	8–23 February 1992; President François Mitterrand	6 (12)	1,801	1,313	488	57	64	Germany
1994	XVII	Lillehammer	Norway	12–27 February 1994; King Harald V	6 (12)	1,737	1,215	522	61	67	Russia
1998	XVIII	Nagano	Japan	7–22 February 1998; Emperor Akihito	7 (14)	2,176	1,389	787	68	72	Germany
2002	XIX	Salt Lake City	United States	8–24 February 2002; President George W. Bush	7 (15)	2,399	1,513	886	78	78 (Note: The IOC site for the 2002 Winter Olympic Games gives an erroneous figure of 77 participated teams; however, one can count 78 participated nations looking through Official Report of the XIX Olympic Winter Games. This error probably resulted from the fact that Costa Rica's delegation of one athlete joined the Games after the Opening Ceremony, so 77 National Olympic Committees participated in the Opening Ceremonies and 78 National Olympic Committees participated in the Games.)	Norway
2006	XX	Turin	Italy	10–26 February 2006; President Carlo Azeglio Ciampi	7 (15)	2,508	1,548	960	84	80	Germany
2010	XXI	Vancouver	Canada	12–28 February 2010; Governor General Michaëlle Jean	7 (15)	2,566	1,522	1,044	86	82	Canada
2014	XXII	Sochi	Russia	7–23 February 2014; President Vladimir Putin	7 (15)	2,873	1,714	1,159	98	88	Norway
2018	XXIII	Pyeongchang	South Korea	9–25 February 2018; President Moon Jae-in	7 (15)	2,922	1,680	1,242	102	92+1 (Note: The IOC site for the 2018 Winter Olympic Games does not include United Korean (COR) women's ice hockey team as separate "nation" when counting participating nations. Nevertheless, the IOC shows the Korean team in the Pyeongchang 2018 Ice Hockey Women's Tournament Results. Thus, 92 National Olympic Committees teams plus 1 team composed of athletes from both South Korea and North Korea participated in the Games.)	Norway
2022	XXIV	Beijing	China	4–20 February 2022; President Xi Jinping	7 (15)	2,861	1,573	1,288	109	91	Norway
2026	XXV	Milan; Cortina d'Ampezzo	Italy	6–22 February 2026; President Sergio Mattarella	8 (16)	2,871	1,533	1,338	116	92	Norway
2030	XXVI	French Alps	France	1–17 February 2030; TBA	8 (17)	3,046 (Note: The Alpes 2030 programme maintains the core athlete quota of 2,900, with an extra 146 quota places allocated for the one optional sport and three disciplines for existing sports proposed by the Alpes 2030 Organising Committee, for 1,525 male athletes, 1,521 female. This will be the first Winter Olympics to achieve full gender parity.)	1,525	1,521	126	TBA	TBA
2034	XXVII	Utah	United States	10–26 February 2034; TBA	TBA	TBA	TBA	TBA	TBA	TBA	TBA

== See also ==
- List of multiple Winter Olympic medalists
- List of participating nations at the Winter Olympic Games
- Lists of Olympic medalists
- List of Olympic Games scandals, controversies and incidents
- Winter Paralympic Games
- Paralympic Games
- Summer Olympic Games

== Sources ==
- Barry, Tim; Crawford, Dee (2002). Revise for Advanced PE for Edexcel. Oxford, England: Heinemann Educational Publishers. ISBN 0-435-10045-9.
- Brownell, Susan (2008). Beijing's games: What the Olympics mean to China. Plymouth, England: Rowman & Littlefield publishers. ISBN 978-0-7425-5640-9.
- Cashmore, Ernest (2005). Making sense of sports. New York, NY: Routledge. ISBN 0-415-34853-6.
- Cashmore, Ernest (2003). Sports culture. New York, NY: Routledge. ISBN 0-415-18169-0.
- Cooper-Chen, Anne (2005). Global entertainment media. Mahwah, New Jersey: Lawrence Erlbaum Associates. ISBN 0-8058-5168-2.
- Findling, John E.; Pelle, Kimberly D. (2004). Encyclopedia of the Modern Olympic Movement. Westport, Connecticut: Greenwood Press. ISBN 0-313-32278-3.
- Findling, John; Pelle, Kimberly (1996). Historical dictionary of the Modern Olympic Movement. Westport, Connecticut: Greenwood Publishing Group. ISBN 0-313-28477-6.
- Fry, John (2006). The story of modern skiing. Lebanon; New Hampshire: University Press of New England. ISBN 978-1-58465-489-6.
- Gershon, Richard A. (2000). Telecommunications Management:Industry structures and planning strategies. Mahwah, New Jersey: Lawrence Erlbaum Associates. ISBN 0-8058-3002-2.
- Guttman, Allen (1986). Sports Spectators. New York, NY: Columbia University Press. ISBN 0-231-06401-2.
- Guttman, Allen (1992). The Olympics, a history of the modern games. Champaign, Illinois: University of Illinois press. ISBN 0-252-02725-6.
- Hazan, Barukh (1982). Olympic sports and propaganda games. New Brunswick, New Jersey: Transaction Inc. ISBN 0-87855-436-X.
- Hill, Christopher R. (1992). Olympic Politics. Manchester, England: Manchester University Press. ISBN 0-7190-3542-2.
- Judd, Ron C. (2008). The Winter Olympics. Seattle, Washington: The Mountaineers Books. ISBN 978-1-59485-063-9.
- Mallon, Bill; Buchanan, Ian (2006). Historical dictionary of the Olympic Movement. Oxford, England: Rowman & Littlefield Publishing Group. ISBN 0-8108-5574-7.
- Mandell, Richard D. (1987). The Nazi Olympics. Champaign, Illinois: University of Illinois Press. ISBN 0-252-01325-5.
- Miller, Toby; Lawrence, Geoffrey; McKay, Jim (2001). Globalization and sport. London: Sage Publications. ISBN 0-7619-5968-8.
- Mottram, David (2003). Drugs in sport. New York, NY: Routledge. ISBN 0-415-27937-2.
- Official Report (1924) of both Summer and Winter Games: M. Avé, Comité Olympique Français (ed.). Les Jeux de la VIII^{e} Olympiade Paris 1924 – Rapport Officiel (PDF) (in French). Paris: Librairie de France. Archived from the original (PDF) on 5 May 2011.
- Payne, Michael (2006). Olympic turnaround. Westport, Connecticut: Greenwood Publishing Group. ISBN 0-275-99030-3.
- Preuss, Holger (2004). The Economics of Staging the Olympics: A Comparison of the Games 1972–2008. Cheltenham, England: Edward Elgar Publishing Limited. ISBN 1-84376-893-3.
- Schaffer, Kay; Smith, Sidonie (2000). Olympics at the Millennium. Piscataway, New Jersey: Rutgers University Press. ISBN 0-8135-2820-8.
- Seligmann, Matthew S.; Davison, John; McDonald, John (2003). Daily Life in Hitler's Germany. New York, NY: Macmillan. ISBN 0-312-32811-7.
- Senn, Alfred Erich (1999). Power, Politics and the Olympic Games. Champaign, Illinois: Human Kinetics. ISBN 0-88011-958-6.
- Wallechinsky, David; Loucky, Jaime (2010). The complete book of the Winter Olympics (8th ed.). Greystone Books. ISBN 978-1-55365-502-2.
- Whannel, Garry (1992). Fields in vision television sport and cultural transformation. New York, NY: Routledge. ISBN 978-0-2039-7756-9.
- Yesalis, Charles (2000). Anabolic steroids and sports and exercise. Champaign, Illinois: Human Kinetics. ISBN 978-0-8801-1786-9.
