= Hansjörg Hirschbühl =

Swiss bobsledder (born 1937)

Medal record

Bobsleigh

World Championships
| Bronze medal – third place | 1960 Cortina d'Ampezzo | Four-man |

Hansjörg Hirschbühl (born 21 May 1937) was a Swiss bobsledder who competed in the late 1950s and early 1960s. His team won a bronze medal in the four-man event at the 1960 FIBT World Championships in Cortina d'Ampezzo. Additionally, Hirschbühl competed in the 1960 Summer Olympics as a wrestler, playing in the light middleweight (73 kg) division. He placed 8th.
