= René Kuhl =

Swiss bobsledder

Medal record

Bobsleigh

World Championships
Bronze medal – third place	1960 Cortina d'Ampezzo	Four-man

René Kuhl was a Swiss bobsledder who competed in the early 1960s. He won a bronze medal in the four-man event at the 1960 FIBT World Championships in Cortina d'Ampezzo.
