= Luciano Alberti =

Italian bobsledder (1932–2021)

Medal record

Bobsleigh

World Championships
Silver medal – second place	1959 St. Moritz	Two-man
Bronze medal – third place	1960 Cortina d'Ampezzo	Two-man

Luciano Alberti (August 25, 1932 – July 15, 2021) was an Italian bobsled brakeman who competed in the late 1950s and early 1960s.

He and Sergio Zardini competed at the 1959 Championships in St. Moritz, where they won a silver medal. They had the fastest time on the first day, with an 8/100 of a second lead against the American team of Arthur Tyler and Tom Butler, but after they "bumped and slowed on the wall en route" during the final run, and Eugenio Monti and Renzo Alvera set a new course record, Zardini and Alberti had to settle for the silver medal.

Alberti and Zardini also won a bronze medal in the same event at the 1960 FIBT World Championships in Cortina d'Ampezzo.
