= Walter Haller =

German bobsledder

Medal record

Men's Bobsleigh

Representing West Germany

World Championships
Gold medal – first place	1958 Garmisch-Partenkirchen	Four-man

Walter Haller was a West German bobsledder who competed in the late 1950s. He won a gold medal in the four-man event at the 1958 FIBT World Championships in Garmisch-Partenkirchen.
