= 1916 Summer Olympics =

Canceled multi-sport event in Berlin, Germany

Games of the VI Olympiad
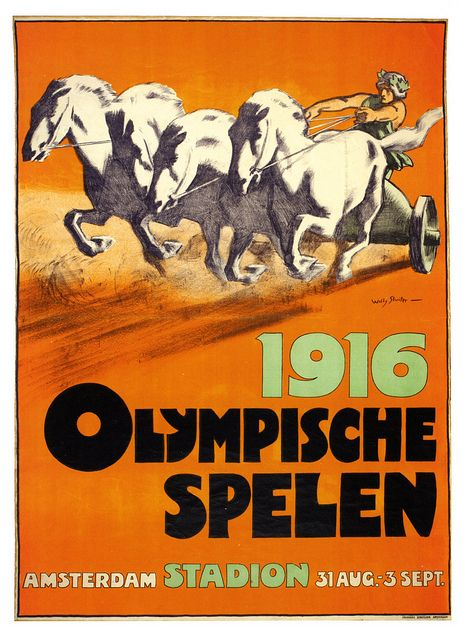
- Poster for Amsterdam's bid in the 1916 Summer Olympics
- Location: Berlin, Germany
- Stadium: Deutsches Stadion

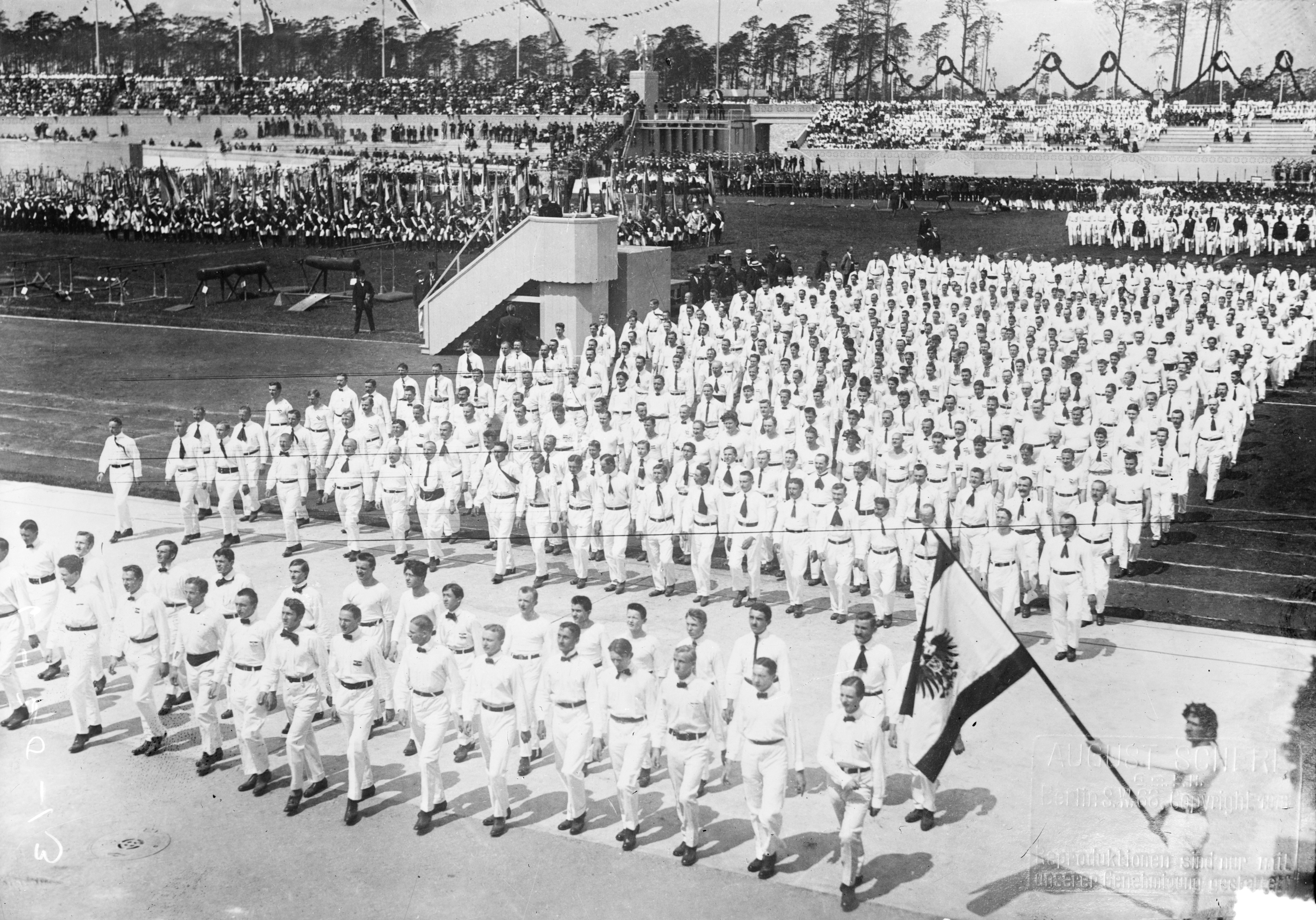
Parade for the opening of the stadium on 8 June 1913

The 1916 Summer Olympics (German: Olympische Sommerspiele 1916), officially known as the Games of the VI Olympiad (German: Spiele der VI. Olympiade), were scheduled to be held in Berlin, Germany, but they were cancelled due to the outbreak of World War I, the first time in the twenty-year history of the Games. Berlin was selected as the host city during the 14th IOC Session in Stockholm on 4 July 1912, defeating bids from Alexandria, Amsterdam, Brussels, Budapest and Cleveland. After the 1916 Games were cancelled, Berlin would eventually host the 1936 Summer Olympics, twenty years later.

== History ==
Work on the stadium, the Deutsches Stadion ("German Stadium"), began in 1912 at what was the Grunewald Race Course. It was planned to seat more than 18,000 spectators. On 8 June 1913, the stadium was dedicated with the release of 10,000 pigeons. 60,000 people were in attendance.

At the outbreak of World War I in 1914, organization continued as it was not expected that the war would continue for several years. Eventually, though, the Games were cancelled.

A winter sports week with speed skating, figure skating, ice hockey and Nordic skiing was planned; the concept of this week eventually gave rise to the first Winter Olympic Games in 1924. The central venue was to have been the Deutsches Stadion.

If the games had been played, Finland (as the Grand Duchy of Finland) would not have been allowed to take part as an independent delegation (as it had done previously) due to Russia revoking its autonomy of participating in international sport in 1914.

Berlin returned to Olympic bidding in 1931, when it beat Barcelona, Spain, for the right to host the 1936 Summer Olympics, the last Olympics before the outbreak of World War II.

== Pre-war preparations ==
At the beginning of 1914, there were fast preparations for the upcoming Olympic Games. First, they had to build the stadium, which took a very long time. After that, Carl Diem, General Secretary of the Organising Committee for the 1916 Games, had to focus on financing the games, which was difficult because the cost would come to about 1,321 million marks (US$738,902,671). Later on, the board of the Olympic Games got together to discuss the programs that were to be sent out to athletes and their families to prepare for the amount of attendees who were to arrive.

== Decision ==
Most of the IOC (International Olympic Committee) members did not know what year to schedule the Olympics. Some believed that the war would not last long and that the Olympics would be able to take place like everyone had planned. Diem, a German man, believed that the war would not last a long time. Even though he thought that, the IOC sent out invitations saying that the Olympics would be postponed until "a more peaceful time" (Kluge 13). In 1914, Pierre de Coubertin signed a contract between Herriot and Count Édouard d’Assche. In this contract, he "promised to postpone its plan until 1924, in the event that Antwerp maintained its candidature for 1920" (Kluge 15). His biggest concern was with the IOC which had made him president in 1907 for the span of ten years. He knew that he had a big responsibility and would not let go of his lead in this role. Coubertin, who played an important role in the decision of where these Olympics should take place, was proposed with many confrontations about moving the Olympics to years ahead, even in different countries. With much consideration, he had decided that the Olympics would stay in Berlin, but the year would change. He looked ahead all the way to 1924. Although this was a tough decision, knowing that there would not be a shortage of competitors was comforting.

== Outcome ==
On 8 August 1915, the stadium was reopened to hold "war competitions" in swimming and cycling, but on 10 February 1916, the Competition Committee of the DRAfOS finally got together again, not since the beginning of the war. They had decided that there would be small games that would take place to get different athletes a chance to compete. Despite the efforts of Coubertin, Diem and many others, the official games had to be canceled and only resumed in 1920, after the end of the war. The Summer Olympics ultimately took place in Berlin in 1936, twenty years after they were supposed to happen, and eighteen years after the war had ended.

== See also ==
- Olympic Games abandoned due to war
  - 1916 Summer Olympics
  - 1940 Summer Olympics
  - 1940 Winter Olympics
  - 1944 Summer Olympics
  - 1944 Winter Olympics
- List of IOC country codes

Summer Olympics
Preceded by Stockholm	VI Olympiad; Berlin; 1916 (cancelled due to World War I)	Succeeded by Antwerp
