= Theodore Bauer (bobsledder) =

West German bobsledder

Medal record

Men's Bobsleigh

Representing West Germany

World Championships
| Gold medal – first place | 1958 Garmisch-Partenkirchen | Four-man |
| Silver medal – second place | 1960 Cortina d'Ampezzo | Four-man |

Theodore Bauer was a West German bobsledder who competed in the late 1950s and the early 1960s. He won two medals in the four-man event at the FIBT World Championships with a gold in 1958 and a silver in 1960.
