= FIBT World Championships 1960 =

Winter sport competition

1960 World Championships
- Location: Cortina d'Ampezzo, Italy

The FIBT World Championships 1960 took place in Cortina d'Ampezzo, Italy for the fifth time. The Italian city had hosted the event previously in 1937 (Two-man), 1939 (Four-man), 1950, and 1954. This was an extraordinary event because bobsleigh was not included in the program at the 1960 Winter Olympics in Squaw Valley, California.

== Two man bobsleigh ==
Pos	Team	Time
Gold	Italy (Eugenio Monti, Renzo Alverà)	
Silver	West Germany (Franz Schelle, Otto Göbl)	
Bronze	Italy (Sergio Zardini, Luciano Alberti)	

The Italian duo of Monti and Alvera won their fourth straight championships in this event.

== Four man bobsleigh ==
Pos	Team	Time
Gold	Italy (Eugenio Monti, Furio Nordio, Sergio Siorpaes, Renzo Alverà)	
Silver	West Germany (Hans Rösch, Alfred Hammer, Theodore Bauer, Albert Kandlbinder)	
Bronze	Switzerland (Max Angst, Hansjörg Hirschbühl, Gottfried Kottmann, René Kuhl)	

== Medal table ==
Rank	Nation	Gold	Silver	Bronze	Total
1	Italy (ITA)	2	0	1	3
2	West Germany (FRG)	0	2	0	2
3	Switzerland (SUI)	0	0	1	1
Totals (3 entries)		2	2	2	6
