= 1944 Summer Olympics =

Cancelled multi-sport event in London, England

Games of the XIII Olympiad
- Location: London United Kingdom

The 1944 Summer Olympics, officially known as the Games of the XIII Olympiad, was a planned international multi-sport event scheduled to have been held from 22 July to 5 August 1944 in London, United Kingdom. The games were cancelled because of World War II alongside the 1944 Winter Olympics in Cortina d'Ampezzo, Italy, and were the fifth games to be cancelled due to war. However, unofficial celebrations went ahead anyway in Switzerland as well as by Polish prisoners of war held in the occupied Poland by the Nazi regime of Germany.

The games eventually took place in London in 1948, which later hosted the 2012 Summer Olympics. This was the fifth interruption of the Olympic Games, the next being the 2020 Summer Olympics in Tokyo, which was delayed to 2021 due to the COVID-19 pandemic. This was the latest Olympic cycle in which the Games were cancelled outright and skipped.

== History ==
London won the bid on the first ballot in a June 1939 International Olympic Committee (IOC) election over Rome, Detroit, Lausanne, Athens, Budapest, Helsinki and Montreal. The selection was made at the 38th IOC Session in 1939 (London).

Due to World War II, which by then had been ongoing for four years and had devastated London, the games were cancelled. In spite of the war, the IOC organised many events to celebrate the fiftieth anniversary of its foundation at its headquarters in Lausanne, Switzerland. Held from 17 to 19 June 1944, this celebration was referred to as The Jubilee Celebrations of IOC by Carl Diem, the originator of the modern tradition of the Olympic torch relay.

Polish prisoners of war in the Oflag II-C POW camp in Woldenberg were granted permission by their Nazi captors to stage an unofficial POW Olympics during 23 July to 13 August 1944, and an Olympic flag made with a bed sheet and pieces of coloured scarves was raised. The event has been considered to be a demonstration of the Olympic spirit transcending war.

== Bid results ==
IOC voting (only one round)
| city | country | votes |
|---|---|---|
| London | (United Kingdom) Britain | 20 |
| Rome | (Fascist Italy) Italy | 11 |
| Detroit | United States | 2 |
| Lausanne | Switzerland | 1 |
| Athens | Greece | 0 |
| Budapest | Hungary | 0 |
| Helsinki | Finland | 0 |
| Montreal | Canada | 0 |

== See also ==
- Olympic Games abandoned due to war
  - 1916 Summer Olympics
  - 1940 Summer Olympics
  - 1940 Winter Olympics
  - 1944 Summer Olympics
  - 1944 Winter Olympics
- List of IOC country codes

== Notes ==
Summer Olympics
| Preceded by Tokyo→Helsinki cancelled due to World War II | XIII Olympiad; London; 1944 (cancelled due to World War II) | Succeeded by London (1948) |
