= 1940 Summer Olympics =

Cancelled multi-sport event

Games of the XII Olympiad
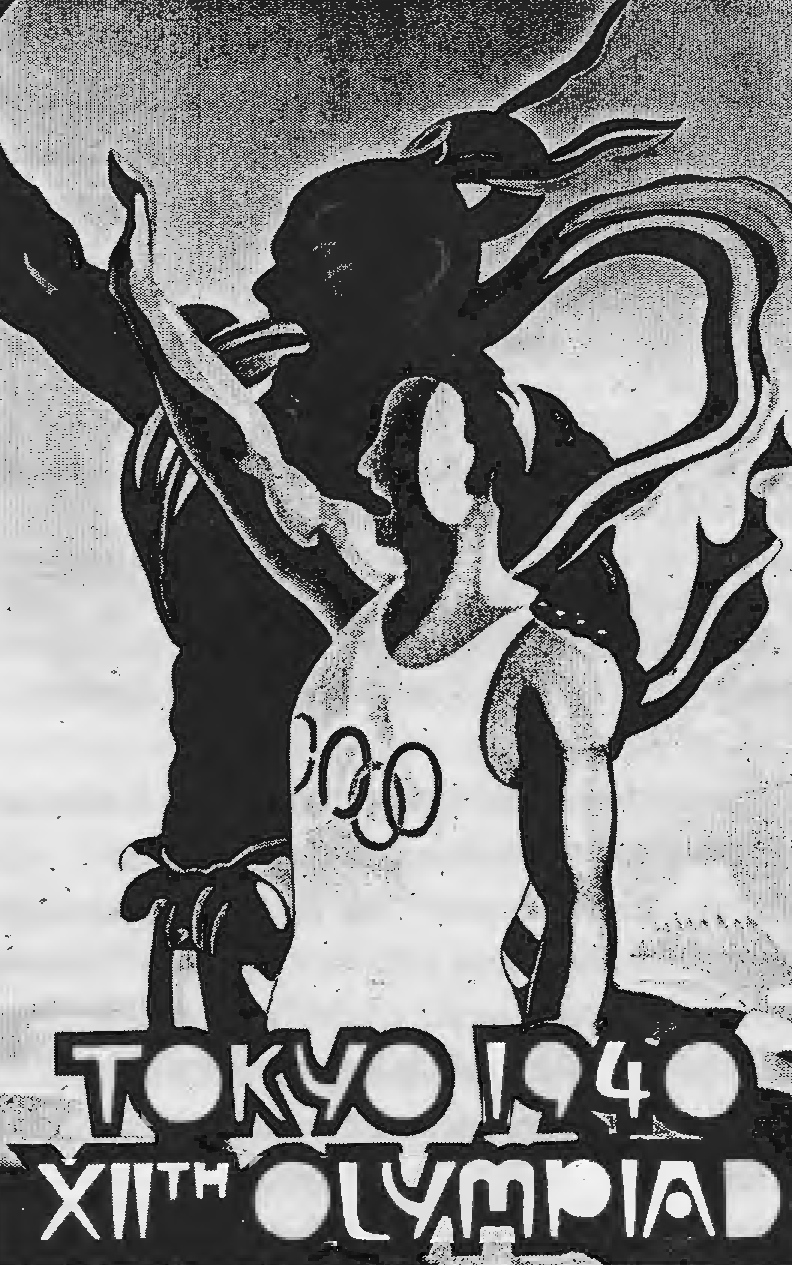
- Poster for the 1940 Games, when they were scheduled to be held in Tokyo
- Location: Tokyo City, Japan; Helsinki, Finland
- Stadium: Meiji Jingu Gaien Stadium; Helsingin Olympiastadion

The 1940 Summer Olympics, officially known as the Games of the XII Olympiad, was a planned international multi-sport event scheduled to have been held from 21 September to 6 October 1940, in Tokyo City, Japan, and later rescheduled for 20 July to 4 August 1940, in Helsinki, Finland following the outbreak of the Second Sino-Japanese War in 1937. They were ultimately cancelled because of World War II alongside the 1940 Winter Olympics in Sapporo, Japan, and were the third games to be cancelled due to war.

Helsinki would eventually host the 1952 Summer Olympics. Tokyo would also later host the 1964 and 2020 Summer Olympics, the latter being postponed to 2021 due to the COVID-19 pandemic.

== 1940 Tokyo Olympics (canceled) ==
The campaign to choose a city for 1940 began in 1932, with Barcelona, Rome, Helsinki, and Tokyo participating. Tokyo city officials suggested a campaign as a means of international diplomacy following Japan's alienation from the League of Nations due to the Mukden Incident, in which Japan occupied Manchuria and created the puppet state of Manchukuo. Additionally, Tokyo city officials hoped the 1940 Olympiad would be awarded to Tokyo so that they would line up with planned festivities for the 2,600th anniversary of the enthronement of Emperor Jimmu.

While both Tokyo officials and International Olympic Committee (IOC) representatives were behind the campaign, the national government, which was ever more interested in military matters, did not have any strong supporters for such a diplomatic gesture. In 1936, Tokyo was chosen in a surprise move, making it the first non-Western city to win an Olympic bid.

Japan's Olympic bid campaign was controversial. Some European IOC representatives argued that hosting the Olympiad in Japan would make travel too difficult for European competitors. Other representatives were concerned about Japan's military campaigns in Asia. In 1935, Japanese IOC delegates Sugimura Yotaro and Soejima Michimasa met with Benito Mussolini to urge him to withdraw Rome's 1940 Olympic bid. This move was highly criticized within the IOC, including by President Henri de Baillet-Latour. Prior to the July 1936 Berlin IOC session, Tokyo city officials invited Baillet-Latour to Tokyo in an attempt to persuade the President that Tokyo would uphold the ideals of Olympism.

=== 1930s Japan and international sports ===
During the 1930 Far Eastern Games in Tokyo, Indian participants were spotted flying the flag of their independence movement rather than the flag of British India. This caused a complaint from the British Olympic Association. In 1934, Japan attempted to invite European colonies to the Far Eastern Games.

=== Planning ===
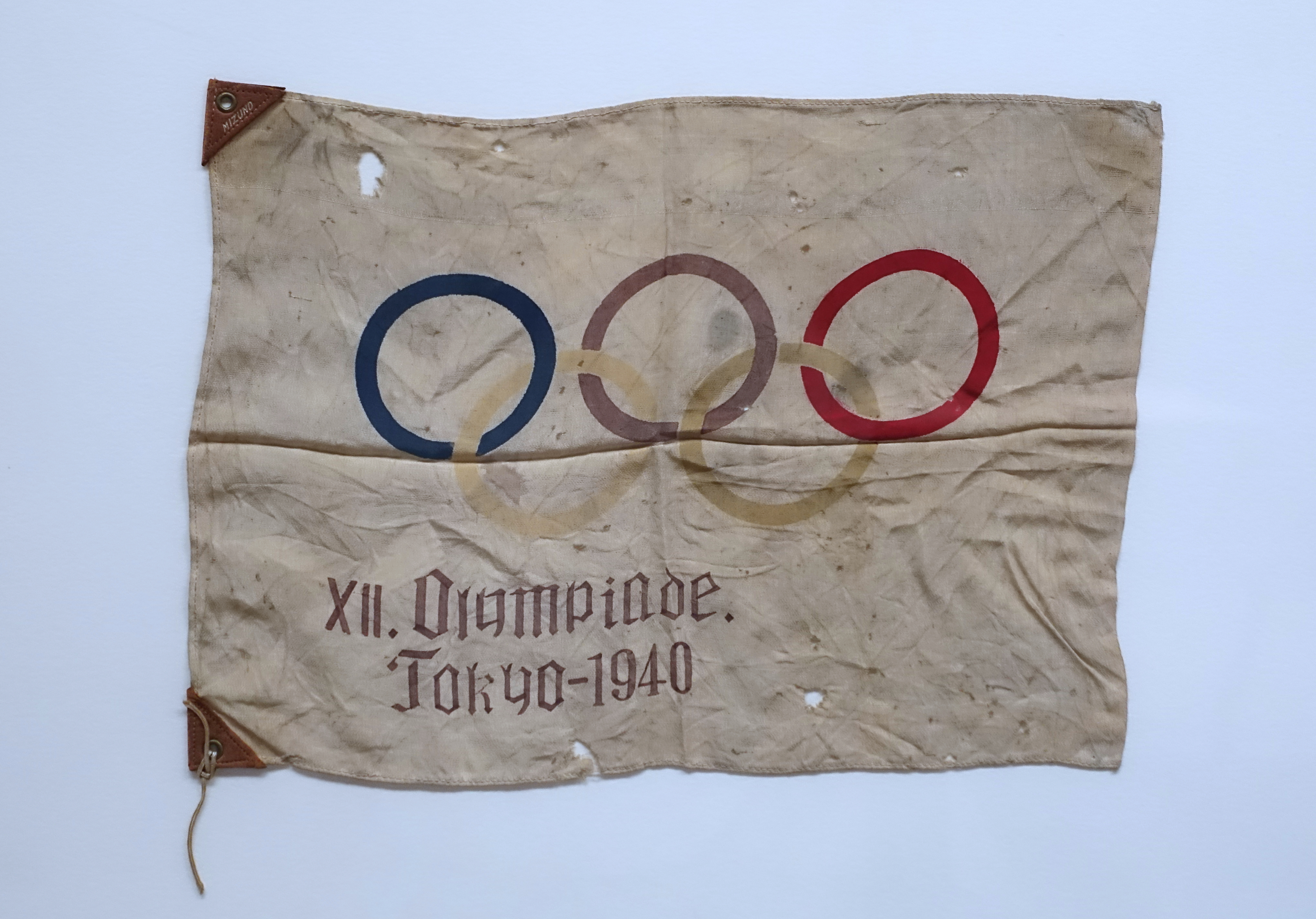
Souvenir flag (1936)

The main stadium was initially to be the Meiji Jingu Gaien Stadium – later used at the 1964 Summer Olympics – reconstructed to accommodate 100,000 spectators; however, the Shrines Bureau of Home Ministry, which had jurisdiction over the Meiji Jingu precinct, strongly opposed the reconstruction. Subsequently, a new stadium was planned at the Komazawa Olympic Park, away from the city center. The Olympic Village was to be built on the present sites of Kinuta Park or Todoroki Gorge. A schedule was drawn up, and guidelines were printed in four languages. Monthly magazines and posters were printed and distributed internationally. Construction began on some buildings, and arrangements were made with hotels, travel agents, and airlines for easy access.

=== Forfeiture of Games ===
When the Second Sino-Japanese War broke out on 7 July 1937, Ichirō Kōno, a member of the Imperial Diet (legislature), immediately requested that the Olympics be forfeited. The 1938 Far Eastern Games were also canceled, but Japan's IOC delegates persisted under a belief that the war would soon be over. Amid the intensification of the war, the feasibility of both the Summer Olympics and the 1940 Winter Olympics grew increasingly questionable to other countries, who suggested a different site be chosen and spoke of the possibility of boycotting the Games were they to proceed in Japan.

In March 1938, Kanō Jigorō, then-IOC member who also represented Japanese Olympic Committee, provided reassurances to the IOC at the organization's Cairo conference that Tokyo would still be able to serve as the host city. However, many Diet members in Japan had already openly questioned hosting the Olympics in wartime, and the military was demanding that the organizers build the venues from wood because they needed metals for the war front. In July, a legislative session was held to decide the matters of the Summer and Winter Olympics and the planned 1940 World's Fair all at once. The World's Fair was only "postponed", under a belief that Japan would be able to wrap up the war, but the Olympics could not be moved and were canceled.

Kōichi Kido, who would later be instrumental in the surrender of Japan in 1945, announced the forfeiture on 16 July 1938. He closed his speech saying, "When peace reigns again in the Far East, we can then invite the Games to Tokyo and take that opportunity to prove to the people of the world the true Japanese spirit." This would come to pass in 1964.

Despite the cancellation of the 1940 Olympics, the Tokyo organizing committee released its budget for the Games. In a departure from standard practice, the budget included all capital outlays as well as direct organizing costs. The total budget was ¥20.1 million, one-third of which would have been paid by the Tokyo metropolitan government.

== Helsinki and other competitions ==
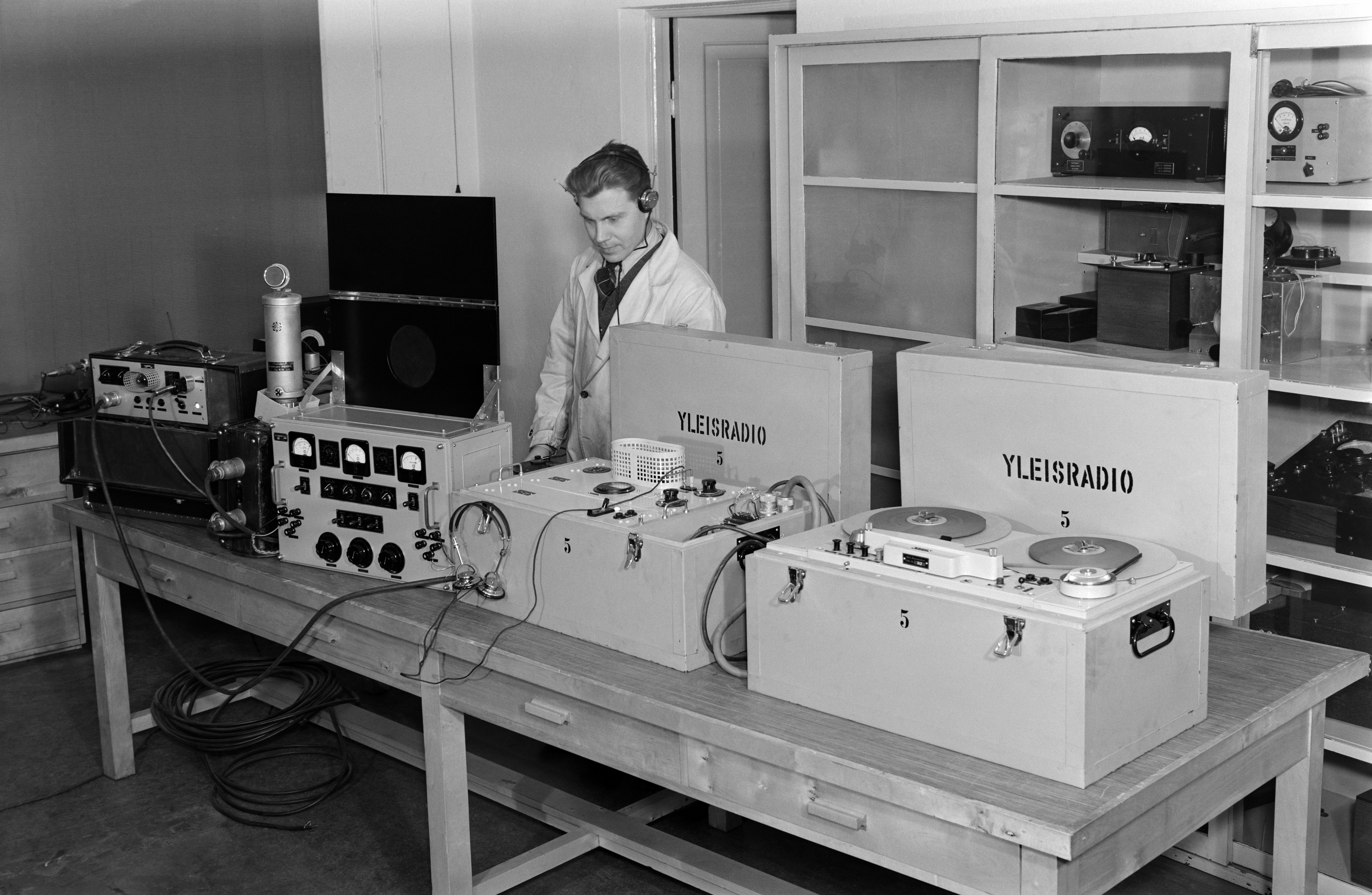
Equipment manufactured by Yle, the Finnish broadcasting company, and AEG for the purpose of broadcasting coverage of the 1940 Games

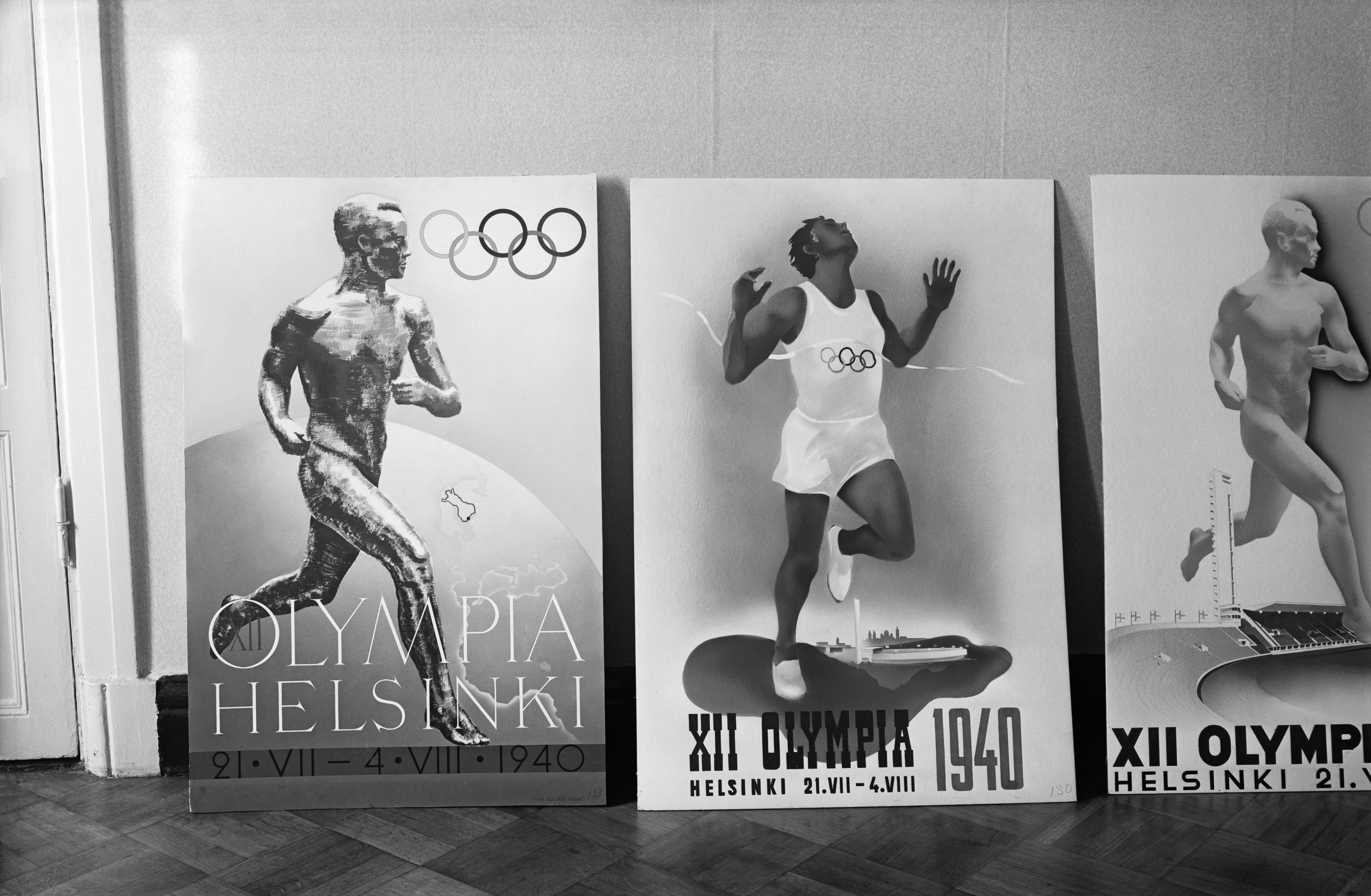
Helsinki Olympic Games 1940 poster competition in 1938

Helsinki, Finland had been the runner-up in the original bidding process and were awarded the Games by the IOC. Construction of stadiums and athlete housing was already underway in Helsinki, and some thought that in the spirit of the original Olympic games to pause warfare, the growing fervor for war on the European continent might be tempered by the Games on European soil. Had Helsinki passed on hosting, London was to have been awarded the Games due to their long standing application. Philadelphia expressed interest in hosting however the United States was considered an unlikely host with Europe favored.

The Games were scheduled to be staged from 20 July to 4 August 1940. In December 1939, however, it was announced by De Baillet-Latour that the games were cancelled, as revealed in Brussels. The Olympics were suspended indefinitely following the outbreak of World War II (the Winter War in particular) and did not resume until the London Games of 1948.

With the Olympics canceled, the major international athletics event of the year turned out to be the annual Finland-Sweden Athletics International, held at the new Helsinki Olympic Stadium, exceptionally held as a triple international among Finland, Sweden and Germany.

Gliding was due to be an Olympic sport in the 1940 Games after a demonstration at the Berlin Games in 1936. The sport has not been featured in any Games since, though the glider designed for it, the DFS Olympia Meise, was produced in large numbers after the war.

Meanwhile, Japan hosted the 1940 East Asian Games in Tokyo, with six participating nations. Helsinki eventually held the 1952 Summer Olympics, while Tokyo held the 1964 Summer Olympics and the 2020 Summer Olympics, although the latter event was postponed to 2021 due to the COVID-19 pandemic.

During August 1940, prisoners of war celebrated a "special Olympics" called the International Prisoner-of-War Olympic Games at Stalag XIII-A in Langwasser, near Nuremberg, Germany. An Olympic flag, 29 by 46 cm in size, was made of a Polish prisoner's shirt and, drawn in crayon, it featured the Olympic rings and banners for Belgium, France, Great Britain, Norway, Poland, and the Netherlands. A feature film, Olimpiada '40, produced by the director Andrzej Kotkowski in 1980 tells the story of these games and of one of the prisoners of war, Teodor Niewiadomski.

== Torch relay ==
After the successful invention of the torch relay in Nazi Germany four years earlier, the proposed method of bringing the Olympic Flame from Greece to Japan was proposed by air delivery, in the purpose-built Messerschmitt Me 261 Adolfine long-range aircraft, which was designed to have a maximum range of some 11,024 km (6,850 mi) unrefueled.

== See also ==
- Olympic Games abandoned due to war
  - 1916 Summer Olympics
  - 1940 Summer Olympics
  - 1940 Winter Olympics
  - 1944 Summer Olympics
  - 1944 Winter Olympics
- List of IOC country codes
- 1964 Summer Olympics
- The first, and to date only, Olympics to be postponed rather than cancelled.
  - 2020 Summer Olympics

== Notes ==
Summer Olympics
Preceded by Berlin	XII Olympiad; Tokyo/Helsinki; 1940 (cancelled due to World War II)	Succeeded by London cancelled due to World War II
