= 1940 Winter Olympics =

Canceled multi-sport event in Sapporo, Japan

V Olympic Winter Games
- Poster for the 1940 Games, when they were scheduled to be held in Sapporo
- Location: Sapporo, Japan; Garmisch-Partenkirchen, Bavaria, Germany

The 1940 Winter Olympics, officially known as the V Olympic Winter Games (第五回オリンピック冬季競技大会, Dai Go-kai Orinpikku Tōkikyōgi Taikai) and as Sapporo 1940 (札幌1940), was a planned international multi-sport event scheduled to have been held from 3 to 12 February 1940 in Sapporo, Empire of Japan. They were ultimately cancelled because of World War II alongside the 1940 Summer Olympics in Tokyo City, Empire of Japan (later Helsinki, Finland), and were the second games to be canceled due to war.

Sapporo subsequently hosted the 1972 Winter Olympics, becoming the first city in Asia to host the Winter Olympics.

== History ==
in March 1936, Sapporo was selected to be the host of the fifth edition of the Winter Olympics, scheduled 3–12 February 1940, but Japan gave the Games back to the IOC in July 1938, after the outbreak of the Second Sino-Japanese War in 1937. The IOC then decided to give the Winter Olympics to St. Moritz, Switzerland, which had hosted it in 1928. However, the Swiss organizers believed that ski instructors should not be considered professionals. The IOC was not of that mind, and the Games were withdrawn again.

In June 1939, the IOC gave the 1940 Winter Olympics, now scheduled for 2–11 February, to Garmisch-Partenkirchen, Germany, where the previous Games had been held. On 1 September, Germany invaded Poland, initiating the European theatre of World War II, and the Winter Games were cancelled in November. Likewise, the 1944 Games, awarded in 1939 to Cortina d'Ampezzo, Italy, were cancelled in 1941. St. Moritz later held the first post-war games in 1948, while Cortina d'Ampezzo hosted in 1956.

Germany has not hosted the Winter Olympics since 1936: on 16 October 1986 Berchtesgaden lost to Albertville, France, to host the 1992 Winter Games. On 6 July 2011 Munich lost to Pyeongchang, South Korea, to host the 2018 Winter Games.

== See also ==
- Olympic Games abandoned due to war
  - 1916 Summer Olympics
  - 1940 Summer Olympics
  - 1940 Winter Olympics
  - 1944 Summer Olympics
  - 1944 Winter Olympics
- List of IOC country codes

Winter Olympics
Preceded by Garmisch-Partenkirchen	V Olympic Winter Games; Sapporo/Garmisch-Partenkirchen; 1940 (abandoned)	Succeeded by Cortina d'Ampezzo cancelled due to World War II
