= 1944 Winter Olympics =

Multisport event, cancelled in World War II

V Olympic Winter Games
- Location: Cortina d'Ampezzo, Italy

The 1944 Winter Olympics, officially known as the V Olympic Winter Games (Italian: V Giochi olimpici invernali) after the cancellation of 1940 Winter Olympics, were a planned international multi-sport event scheduled to have been held in February 1944 in Cortina d'Ampezzo, Italy. The games were cancelled because of World War II alongside the 1944 Summer Olympics in London, Great Britain, and were the fourth games to be cancelled due to war. This is also the latest occasion in which the Winter Olympic cycle was interrupted.

The games eventually took place in St. Moritz, Switzerland in 1948. Cortina d'Ampezzo would later host the 1956 Winter Olympics, and co-host the 2026 Winter Olympics with Milan.

== See also ==
- Olympic Games abandoned due to war
  - 1916 Summer Olympics
  - 1940 Summer Olympics
  - 1940 Winter Olympics
  - 1944 Summer Olympics
  - 1944 Winter Olympics
- List of IOC country codes

Winter Olympics
Preceded by Sapporo/Garmisch-Partenkirchen cancelled due to World War II	V Olympic Winter Games; Cortina d'Ampezzo; 1944 (abandoned)	Succeeded by St. Moritz
