= Olympic Museum (disambiguation) =

Olympic Museum may refer to one of the following:

Museums linked to the Olympic Games:

- Olympic Museum, in Lausanne, Switzerland
- Australian Gallery of Sport and Olympic Museum, Melbourne, Australia
- Juan Antonio Samaranch Olympic and Sports Museum, in Barcelona, Spain
- Lake Placid Winter Olympic Museum, in Lake Placid, New York
- Norwegian Olympic Museum, in Lillehammer, Norway
- Seoul Olympic Museum, in Seoul, South Korea
- Thessaloniki Olympic Museum, in Thessaloniki, Greece
- British Olympic Museum, is planning to be built in London, Great Britain
- New Zealand Olympic Museum, in Wellington New Zealand
- Sarajevo Winter Olympics Museum, in Sarajevo, Bosnia and Herzegovina
- Olympic Museum in Cotonou, Benin, belonging to the Comité olympique et sportif béninois, at the Stade de l'Amitié-Kouhounou
- United States Olympic & Paralympic Museum, in Colorado Springs, Colorado

Museums linked to Olympia, Washington, USA:

- Olympic Flight Museum, aviation museum located in Olympia, Washington
