= Estonian Sports and Olympic Museum =

Museum in Tartu, Estonia

Coordinates: 58°22′56″N 26°43′17″E

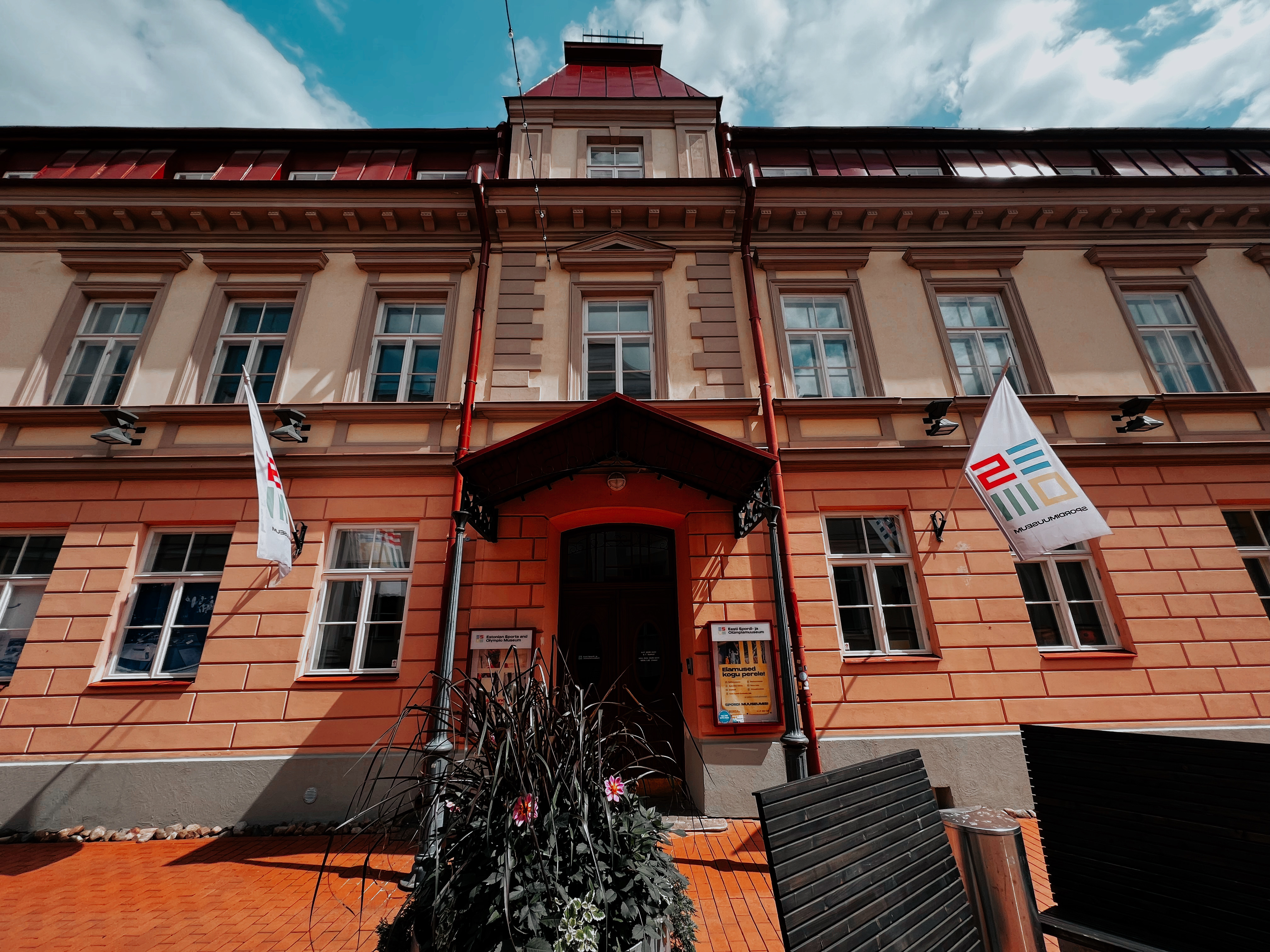
- Estonian Sports and Olympic Museum
- Established: 1963
- Location: Rüütli 15, Tartu, Estonia
- Collection size: 150,000 (2021)
- Director: Siim Randoja
- Website: www.spordimuuseum.ee

Olympic Museums Network
- 3-2-1 Qatar Olympic and Sports Museum; Athens Olympic Museum; Brazilian Olympic Museum; Canadian Olympic Experience; China Sports Museum; Deutsches Sport & Olympia Museum; Estonian Sports Museum; Gothenburg Sports Museum; Joan Antoni Samaranch Olympic and Sport Museum; Museum of Sport and Tourism; Nagano Olympic Museum; Nanjing Olympic Museum; National Museum of Sports, Olympics and Paralympic Games; Norwegian Olympic Museum; The Olympic Experience; The Olympic Museum; Olympic Museum of Peruvian Sport; Samaranch Memorial Museum; Sapporo Olympic Museum; Seoul Olympic Museum; Singapore Youth Olympic Museum; Slovak Olympic and Sports Museum; Sportimonium; Sports Museum of Finland; Thessaloniki Olympic Museum; Tianjin D. Olympic Museum; United States Olympic & Paralympic Museum; Xiamen Olympic Museum

The Estonian Sports and Olympic Museum (Estonian: Eesti Spordi- ja Olümpiamuuseum), founded in 1963 and modernized in 2020, is the largest sports museum in the Baltic states. The museum is located on Rüütli street in Tartu, Estonia. Before 2016, Estonian Sports and Olympic Museum was named Estonian Sports Museum.

== History ==
The idea to establish a sports museum in Estonia was born at the beginning of the 20th century. In 1913, the opening of the museum was discussed by the members of the Kalev society operating in Tallinn. It was an innovative idea for that time, because independent sports museums were still almost unknown in the world. In the 1920s, the plan to create a museum was included in the statutory activities of the Estonian Sports Central Union. Collecting sports historical materials for the Central Union became the heart of former professional wrestler Tõnu Võimula.

=== Creating the actual museum ===
After the Second World War, Tõnu Võimula bequeathed both the idea and the materials he collected to Johannes Laidvere, who taught sports history at Tartu State University at the time. As a result of the joint efforts of several enthusiasts, in 1962 a committee for the establishment of a sports museum was formed, headed by the head of the physical education department of the Estonian Academy of Agriculture, Aksel Tiik.

The committee acted effectively, and already on January 28, 1963, the Presidium of the Council of the Union of Sports Associations and Organizations of the Estonian SSR approved the statutes and personnel of the museum. That is why January 28 is considered the birthday of the Estonian Sports and Olympic Museum. Aksel Tiik became the director of the museum, which operated on a social basis.

=== Estonian SSR National Sports Museum ===
Step by step, it became clear to the people of the public museum that their enthusiasm was not enough to ensure the development of the museum, and so the direction was taken to create a national museum. On July 1, 1967, the Estonian SSR National Sports Museum was finally established by the decree of the Council of Ministers of the Estonian SSR under the Ministry of Culture of the Estonian SSR, whose first director was sports historian Olaf Langsepp, who contributed to the birth of the sports museum.

=== After the re-independence of the Republic of Estonia ===
In the second half of the 1990s, the sports museum's collections expanded rapidly, which is why the previous home in the wing building of Tartu St. Paul's Church began to seem small. In the search for a new location, the choice fell on the building of the former Tartu post office located on Rüütli Street, which, however, needed major renovation. A year and a half was spent on archaeological excavations and supporting the foundation, then the old walls of the building also received new content. The house received reinforced concrete false ceilings and a mansard floor, and medieval masonry remains were excavated in the basement and preserved. The total area of the building increased to 2,200 square meters. Construction work was completed by the summer of 2001. By August 1 of the same year, the entire museum had moved to a new location. On October 1, 2001, the building was also opened to visitors.

On April 9, 2001, Enn Mainla, who had been in the position for 30 years, left the position of museum director. Former Tartu sports manager Mati Tolmoff became the new director.

In November 2015, the Ministry of Culture proposed to the Estonian Olympic Committee the creation of the Estonian Sports and Olympic Museum Foundation instead of the Estonian Sports Museum. The initial agreement for the Foundation was signed on April 14, 2016 by the then Minister of Culture Indrek Saar and the President of the Estonian Olympic Committee Neinar Seli. Since 2016, Siim Randoja has been the director of the foundation.

The museum is close to the river Emajõgi, the main building of Tartu University and the botanical gardens. On the opposite side of the street is a notable secondary school (Hugo Treffner Gymnasium).

== Modern day in sports museum ==
=== Permanent exhibition "The Story of Estonian Sport" ===
Sports museum was re-opened in October 2020 with a brand new permanent exhibition "The Story of Estonian Sport", Estonian Sports Hall of Fame and various hands-on activities like rally simulator, reaction wall, retro room, interactive basketball court, historical gym and many other fun attractions. The museum consists of exhibition rooms on three floors, historic cellar and specialized library. The museum contains collections of historic awards, cups and sports equipment. With the renovation Estonian Sports and Olympic Museum opened also new permanent exhibition „The Story of Estonian Sport“ takes you on a trip across the history of sports in Estonia. It tells you a story of a speck of land and colossal wins. It tells a story of the glitter of gold medals but also of the dark shadows of foul play.

The most spectacular part of the new exhibition is the totally new Estonian Sports Hall of Fame. Here the visitors can see some never-before publicly seen footage of 50 of the greatest Estonian athletes and sports personalities of the last century. Each of the Hall of Famer's gets a special recognition in this room with an honorary plate, highlight reel of their career and an overview of their greatest achievements. Estonian Sports Hall of Fame was created in 2020 with the first 50 members being chosen from personas whose career ended before 2000. Starting from 2021 new members will be added yearly.

=== Temporary exhibitions after re-opening ===
==== Temporary exhibitions as of 2023 ====
2023 - The Estonian Sports and Olympic Museum celebrated its 60th birthday on January 28, 2023, during which the jubilee exhibition "Sports Museum in the language of things" was also opened. The exhibition brings the story of the sports museum to those interested through the objects. The new additional point of view allows not only to get acquainted with several significant things, but also opens up their background and raises various topics for discussion.

The oldest object that can be seen dates from the 19th century, the youngest is barely a year old. By visiting the exhibition, you can go through the life path of the sports museum so far and explore the great photos from this journey. The joy of discovery is sure to be shared by both young and old.

2022 - a temporary exhibition on extreme sports "X-FAKTOR" was opened in the sports museum. Extreme sports can be called all areas, the practice of which requires a view that pushes the limits of human abilities and a little more courage and dexterity. From street sports such as skateboarding and parkour, to figure skating and skydiving - at the "X-FAKTOR" exhibition of the Sports Museum, you can get an overview of extreme sports in general and also how different areas are related to Estonia.

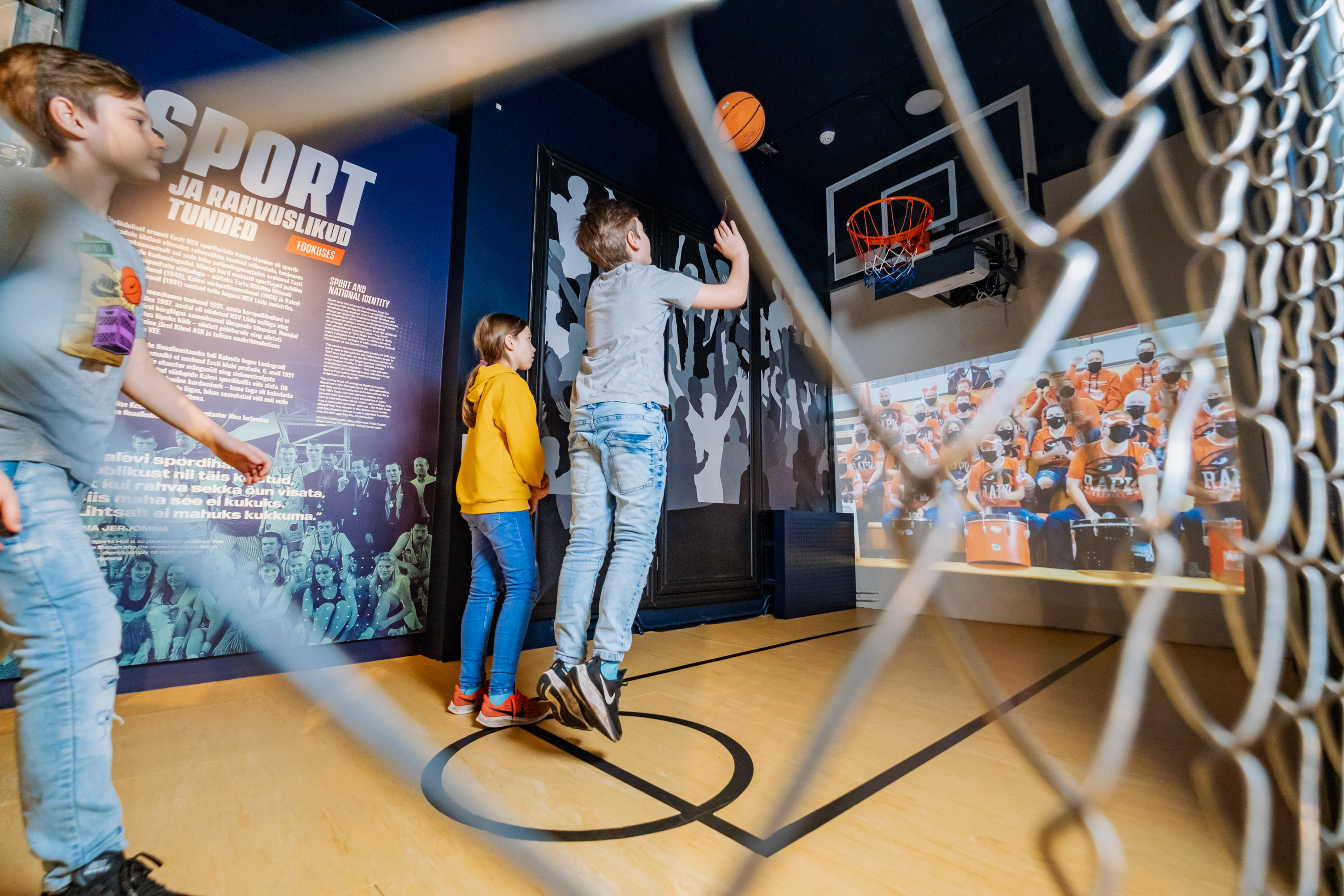
Basketball cage in sports museum

2019 - Historical exhibition "Tartu is on fire!" - Did you know that the great fire of Tartu in 1775 started on the plot next to the location of today's Sports Museum? The causes of the accident have not yet been known, but according to several speculations, the flames were ignited by careless smoking or distilling vodka. The historical walls tell their own story, which date back to the Middle Ages.

Temporary exhibitions which have ended

2022 Special stationery exhibition "Raamat loeb" - At the exhibition, you could find sports books from the 19th century as well as printed materials that were awarded to athletes or belonged to sports figures who played an important role in the history of Estonian sports. books that were given to athletes as prizes. There was also a large number of notable autographs at the exhibition. The exhibition gave an opportunity to get acquainted with the most exciting works of the sports museum's library.

2022 Special exhibition "Vader's treasure" - Vader is the nickname of professional cyclist Rein Taaramäe. However, the treasure was not the usual tempting collection of precious metal awards, but a unique collection of things that in one way or another are related to the highlights of Vader's sports career.

2022 Gunnar Vaidla sports panorama - for decades, photographer Gunnar Vaidla did a commendable job documenting sports life all over Estonia, always being in the focus of events - both in the rain and in the sun, in summer and in winter, both in a warm room and in a cold forest.

This exhibition examined his recordings from the complex post-war years 1947–1953, which focused primarily on the practical side of doing sports.

2021 "Estonia against Europe's best" - on the opening day of the 2021 European Football Championship, on June 11, the doors were also opened to a brand new football-themed exhibition, which focused on Estonia's confrontations with that year's European Championship participants. In cooperation with several collectors and representatives of the Estonian Football Association, 24 jerseys with a dignified past, which belonged to the teams participating in the EC, were acquired for the exhibition.

2021 "Masks on!" – Considering the current health situation in the world, it was a sin for the researchers and curators of the Sports Museum not to discuss this topic. However, the purpose of the temporary exhibition was not to reflect the mask craze that accompanied the coronavirus, but rather specific face coverings that protect athletes in their daily work. Almost thirty pieces of such areas, where one of the important elements is a mask, were collected.

2021 Photo exhibition "Tokyo 2020 in pictures" - Just like any sports event, the XXXII Tokyo 2020 Summer Olympic Games offered all sports lovers a lot of emotions - both brighter and a little dimmer. During the 17 days of the major competition, which was postponed for a year due to the worldwide pandemic, 34 Estonian athletes from 14 different sports were in the competition, all of whom are now a part of the sports history written in the summer of 2021 and whose achievements can be remembered in the future with the help of the athletes' own words, video and photo material.

2020 Interlude: Senseless sport! – In 2020, the sports museum opened the possibility to play ping-pong with ultraviolet light in a dark room.

== Important dates from the museums history ==
- 1963 - the museum is created publicly
- 1967 - Estonian SSR National Sports Museum is made
- 1969 - first exhibition outside of the museum "Wrestling Coryphe Georg Hackenschmidt"
- 1971 - the first permanent exhibition "On the history of Estonian physical culture and sports" was opened
- 1975 - museum collection is more than 10 000 pieces
- 1987 - the second permanent exhibition "Physical culture and sport in Estonia" was opened
- 1989 - Estonian Sports history society is created
- 1993 - museum collection is more than 50 000 pieces
- 2001 - museum moved to its new location: Rüütli 15, Tartu
- 2002 - museum collection is more than 100 000 pieces
- 2006 - The Estonian Sports Museum becomes a founding member of the international cooperation network of Olympic museums OMN
- 2013 - Estonian Sports and Olympic Museum celebrates 50th birthday
- 2020 - museum is re-opened and opened a new permanent exhibition "The story of Estonian sport"
- 2022 - experience exhibition about extreme sports "X-FAKTOR"
- 2023 - Estonian Sports and Olympic Museum celebrates 60th birthday
