= Joan Antoni Samaranch Olympic and Sport Museum =

- Museu Olímpic i de l'Esport Joan Antoni Samaranch
- Museum entrance
- Established: 2007
- Location: Barcelona, Catalonia, Spain
- Coordinates: 41.366331°N 2.157064°E
- Type: Sports museum
- Website: www.museuolimpicbcn.cat

Olympic Museums Network
- 3-2-1 Qatar Olympic and Sports Museum; Athens Olympic Museum; Brazilian Olympic Museum; Canadian Olympic Experience; China Sports Museum; Deutsches Sport & Olympia Museum; Estonian Sports Museum; Gothenburg Sports Museum; Joan Antoni Samaranch Olympic and Sport Museum; Museum of Sport and Tourism; Nagano Olympic Museum; Nanjing Olympic Museum; National Museum of Sports, Olympics and Paralympic Games; Norwegian Olympic Museum; The Olympic Experience; The Olympic Museum; Olympic Museum of Peruvian Sport; Samaranch Memorial Museum; Sapporo Olympic Museum; Seoul Olympic Museum; Singapore Youth Olympic Museum; Slovak Olympic and Sports Museum; Sportimonium; Sports Museum of Finland; Thessaloniki Olympic Museum; Tianjin D. Olympic Museum; United States Olympic & Paralympic Museum; Xiamen Olympic Museum

The Joan Antoni Samaranch Olympic and Sport Museum (Catalan: Museu Olímpic i de l'Esport Joan Antoni Samaranch, IPA: [muˈzɛw uˈlimpiɣ i ðə ləsˈpɔɾd ʒuˈan ənˈtɔni səməˈɾaŋ]) opened in 2007 at the Olympic Ring in Barcelona, Catalonia, Spain. The museum is located in front of the Lluís Companys Olympic Stadium at the Montjuïc hill. In June 2010 it was renamed in honour of Juan Antonio Samaranch, who was president of the International Olympic Committee from 1980 to 2001 and a key person during the 1992 Summer Olympics, which were held in Barcelona.

The museum displays high-performance sport competitions, recreational sports, sports in general and sports for disabled people. It shows how sport can promote values, educate, innovate and renew. The museum has a sport idols space with outstanding players. It also hosts an area for mass sport and major events. It includes advanced technology and interactive multimedia installations.

One of the most emblematic collections of the museum was donated by the museum's namesake, Juan Antonio Samaranch.

It also includes a temporary exhibition hall and a display of sport in different civilizations. The museum is managed by the Barcelona Olympic Foundation, which is headquartered at the museum.

The museum project was approved by the Barcelona city council in 2005. The museum opened on March 21, 2007.

== See also ==
- Olympic Museum (disambiguation)
