= Museum of Sport and Tourism =

Museum in Warsaw, Poland

Coordinates: 52°16′27″N 20°59′49″E

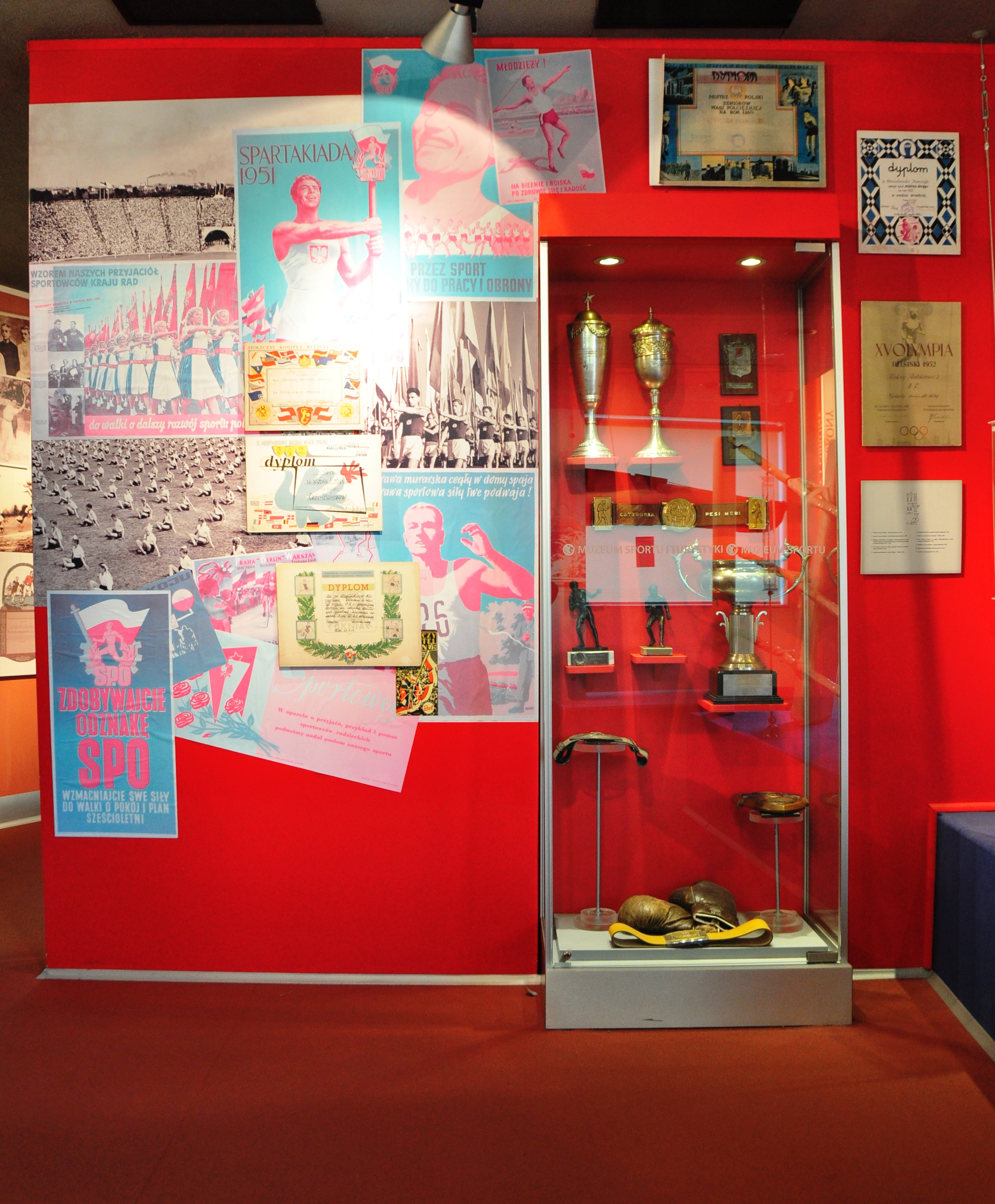
- Established: 1952
- Location: Wybrzeże Gdyńskie 4 Warsaw, Poland
- Website: www.muzeumsportu.waw.pl

Olympic Museums Network
- 3-2-1 Qatar Olympic and Sports Museum; Athens Olympic Museum; Brazilian Olympic Museum; Canadian Olympic Experience; China Sports Museum; Deutsches Sport & Olympia Museum; Estonian Sports Museum; Gothenburg Sports Museum; Joan Antoni Samaranch Olympic and Sport Museum; Museum of Sport and Tourism; Nagano Olympic Museum; Nanjing Olympic Museum; National Museum of Sports, Olympics and Paralympic Games; Norwegian Olympic Museum; The Olympic Experience; The Olympic Museum; Olympic Museum of Peruvian Sport; Samaranch Memorial Museum; Sapporo Olympic Museum; Seoul Olympic Museum; Singapore Youth Olympic Museum; Slovak Olympic and Sports Museum; Sportimonium; Sports Museum of Finland; Thessaloniki Olympic Museum; Tianjin D. Olympic Museum; United States Olympic & Paralympic Museum; Xiamen Olympic Museum

Muzeum Sportu i Turystyki w Warszawie (Polish: Muzeum Sportu i Turystyki, MSiT) is a museum in Warsaw, Poland. It was established in 1952 and is one of the oldest of its type in Europe.

The museum holds a permanent exhibition entitled “The history of Polish Sport and Olympic Movement” which covers the history of sport from Ancient Greece until the modern era. Visitors can see sports gear, medals, trophies, antiques and other historic objects.

Accumulated collections contain over 46 thousand exhibits, sport trophies, like medals, cups and diplomas, as well as outfits and equipment. The museum also contains a big variety of books, pictures, newspapers, postcards as well as audio and video materials.
