= Olympic Museum =

Sports museum in Lausanne, Switzerland

- Musée olympique

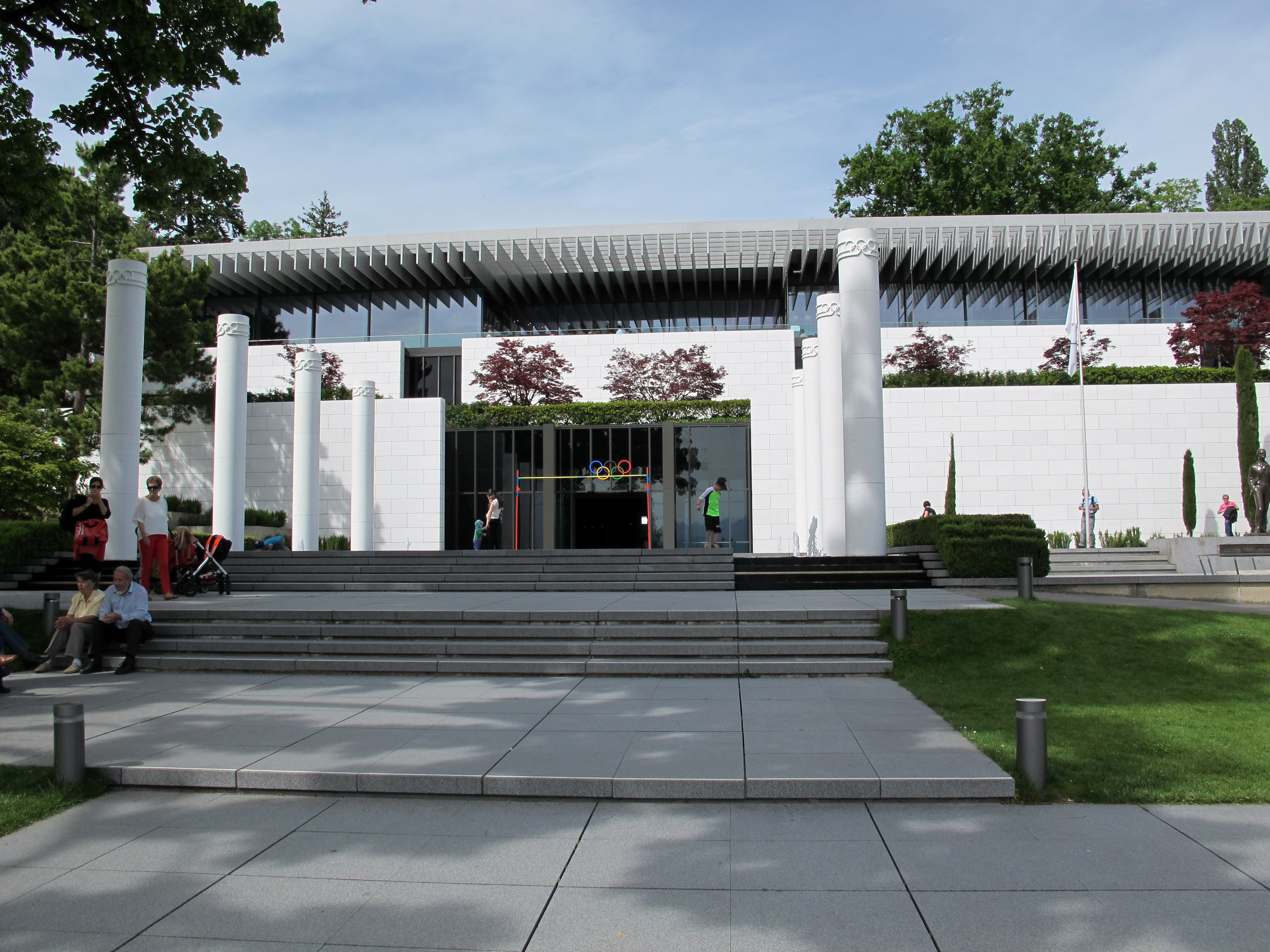
- The main entrance
- Interactive fullscreen map
- Established: 23 June 1993; 33 years ago
- Location: Lausanne, Switzerland
- Coordinates: 46°30′31″N 6°38′02″E
- Collection size: 10,000
- Visitors: 250,000
- Founder: Juan Antonio Samaranch
- Website: olympic.org

Olympic Museums Network
- 3-2-1 Qatar Olympic and Sports Museum; Athens Olympic Museum; Brazilian Olympic Museum; Canadian Olympic Experience; China Sports Museum; Deutsches Sport & Olympia Museum; Estonian Sports Museum; Gothenburg Sports Museum; Joan Antoni Samaranch Olympic and Sport Museum; Museum of Sport and Tourism; Nagano Olympic Museum; Nanjing Olympic Museum; National Museum of Sports, Olympics and Paralympic Games; Norwegian Olympic Museum; The Olympic Experience; The Olympic Museum; Olympic Museum of Peruvian Sport; Samaranch Memorial Museum; Sapporo Olympic Museum; Seoul Olympic Museum; Singapore Youth Olympic Museum; Slovak Olympic and Sports Museum; Sportimonium; Sports Museum of Finland; Thessaloniki Olympic Museum; Tianjin D. Olympic Museum; United States Olympic & Paralympic Museum; Xiamen Olympic Museum

The Olympic Museum (French: Musée olympique) in Lausanne, Switzerland houses permanent and temporary exhibits relating to sport and the Olympic movement. With more than 10,000 artifacts, the museum is the largest archive of Olympic Games memorabilia in the world and one of Lausanne's prime tourist site draws attracting more than 250,000 visitors each year.

The Olympic Museum and the Olympic Park (sculpture garden between the museum and Lake Léman) are located at Ouchy, south of Lausanne. The headquarters of the International Olympic Committee (IOC) are located at Vidy, to the west of Ouchy.

== History ==
The museum was founded on 23 June 1993, on the initiative of then-president of the IOC Juan Antonio Samaranch. Mexican architect Pedro Ramírez Vázquez, an International Olympic Committee member, and Jean-Pierre Cahen, were in charge of the project. The museum was named the European Museum of the Year in 1995.

After 23 months of renovation between 2012 and 2013, the Olympic Museum re-opened on 21 December 2013. During the transformations of the building, a temporary exhibition was set up in a boat (Helvétie) of the CGN, in front of the Olympic Park.

With the renovation, the surface of the museum increased from 2,000 m^{2} (22,000 sq ft) (in 2011) to 3,000 m^{2} (32,000 sq ft) (in 2013).

== Exhibits ==
The permanent exhibition is organized into three major themes on three separate floors: Olympic World, Olympic Games, and Olympic Spirit. A visit begins on the third floor, where the Olympic World part of the exhibition informs visitors of the history of the ancient Olympic Games and the rebirth of the modern Games in the 19th century. Highlights include a display of Olympic torches, as well as a video documenting major moments in the history of opening ceremonies history.

The second floor focuses on Olympic Games. Sporting equipment for a variety of sports are on display, and visitors are introduced to the Youth Olympic Games and the Paralympic Games. More than 1,000 video clips of Olympic Games events and athletes can be searched and viewed at individual viewing stations.

The final part of the permanent exhibit covers the Olympic Spirit, where visitors are made to feel part of an Olympic Village and can test their balance, agility, and mental skills with interactive exercises. Olympic medals are also on display.

The renovated museum also includes a temporary exhibit space, where the museum regularly hosts traveling exhibits.

== Olympic Park ==
The Olympic Museum is surrounded by a park containing numerous works of art on the theme of sports. Among the most notable works of art in the museum's permanent collection are the French sculptors Auguste Rodin's The American Athlete and Niki de Saint Phalle's Les Footballeurs, the Luxembourgish sculptor Lucien Wercollier's tribute to the pole vault titled Altius, the Colombian sculptor Fernando Botero's Jeune Fille a la Balle, and a kinetic art sculpture by the Swiss sculptor Jean Tinguely which combines a hockey stick, a boar's head, and a motorbike wheel.

== Gallery ==
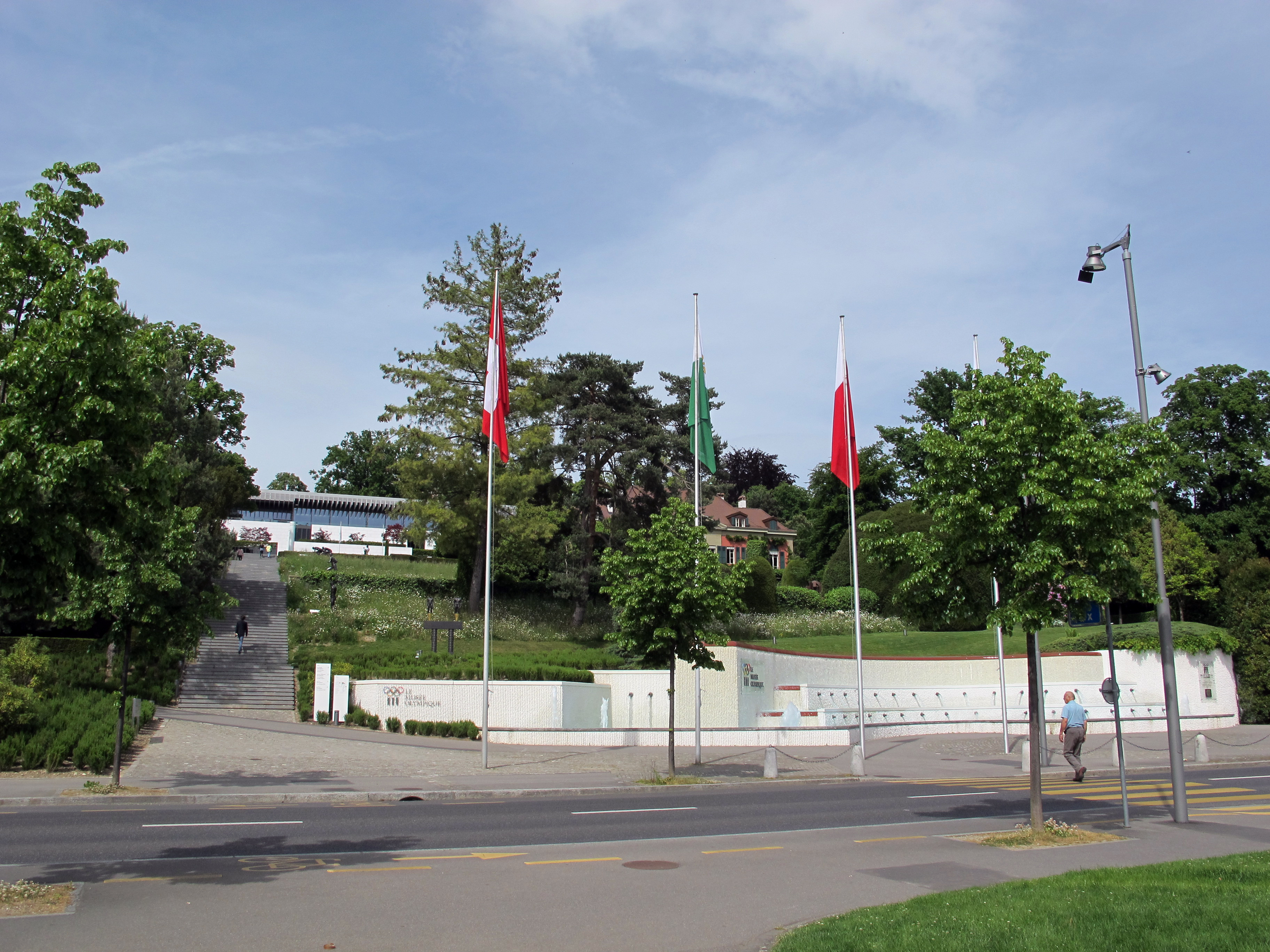
From the shores of Lake Léman

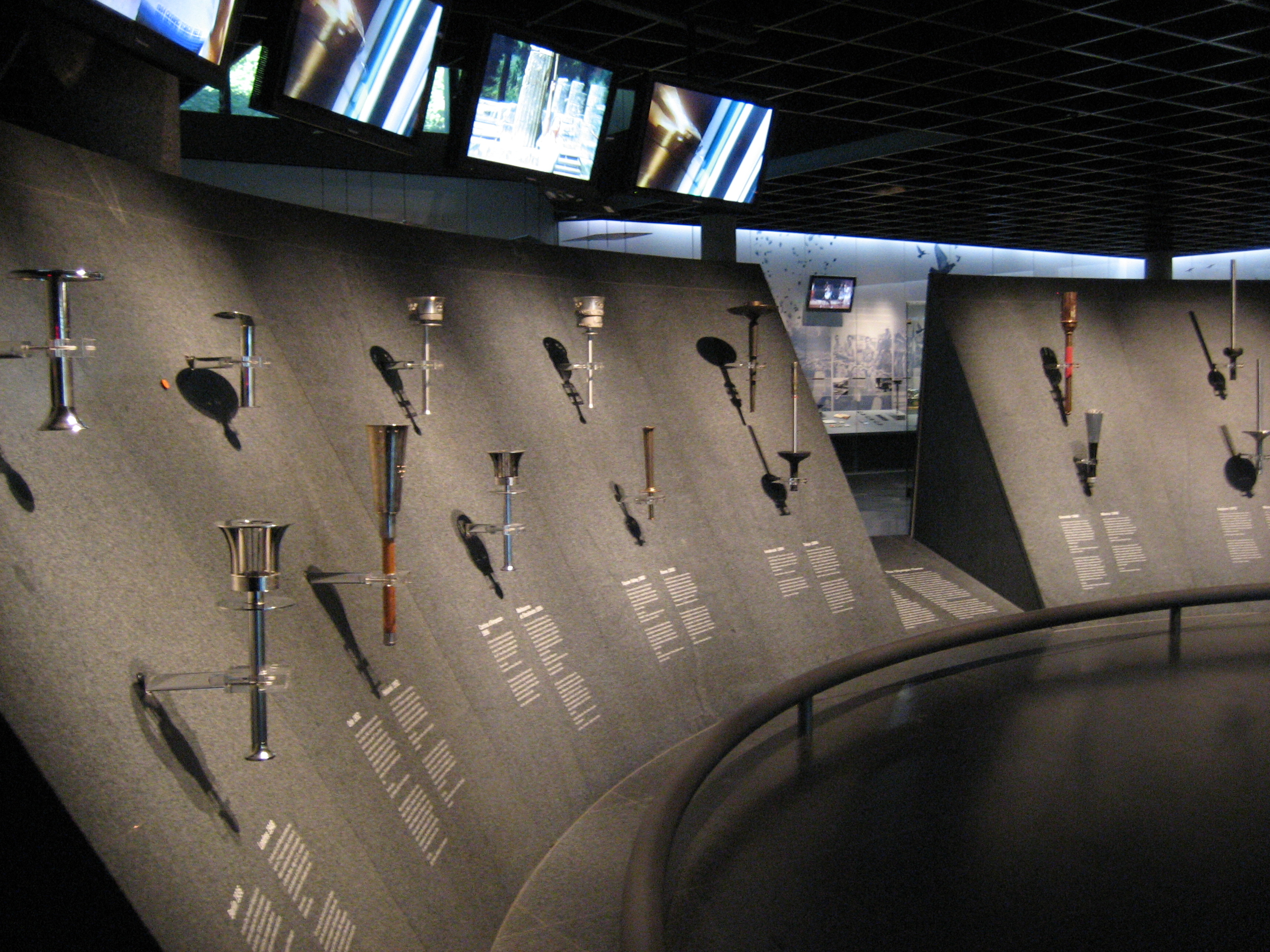
Olympic torches inside the museum before the 2012 floods.

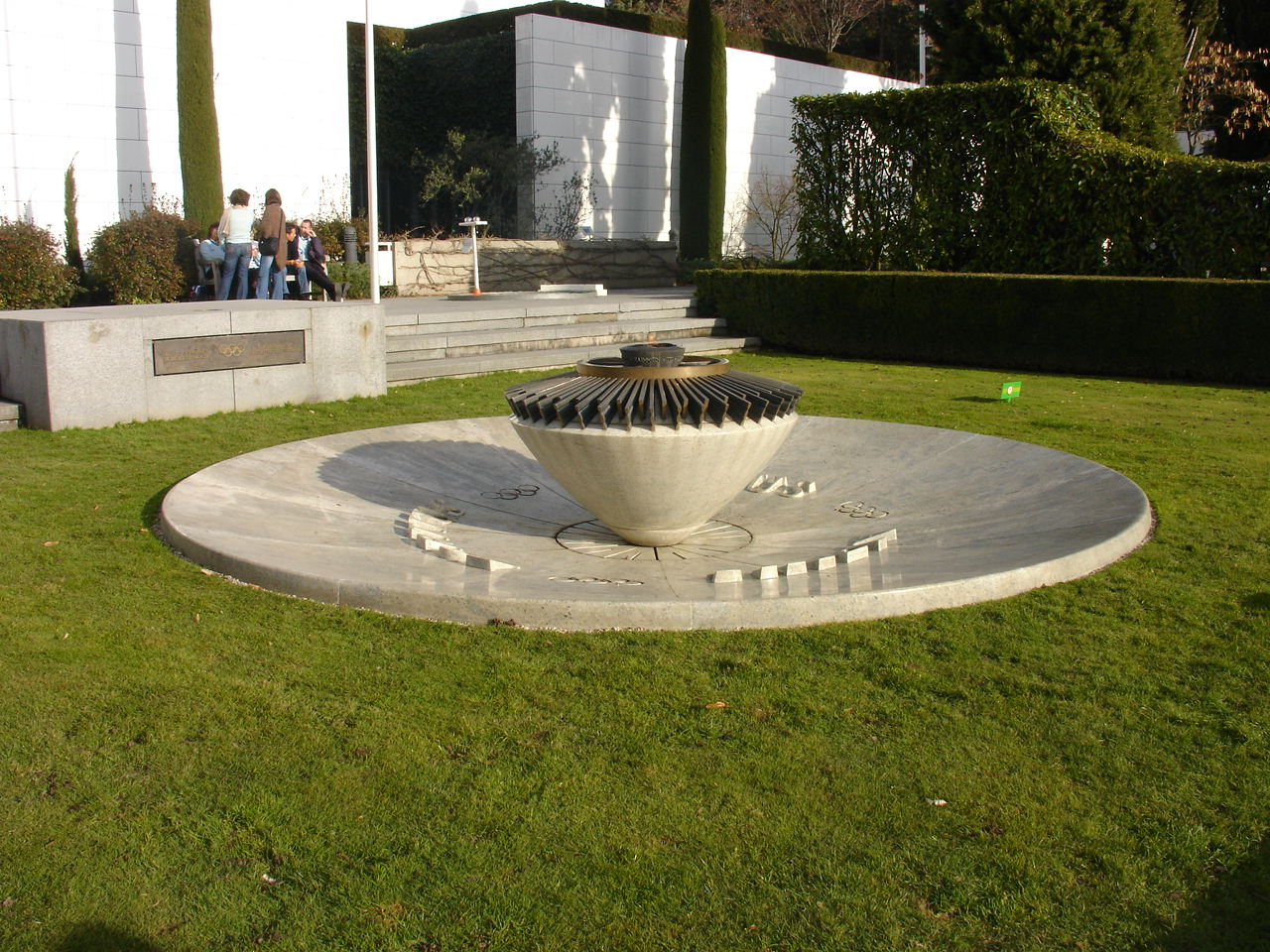
The Olympic Flame

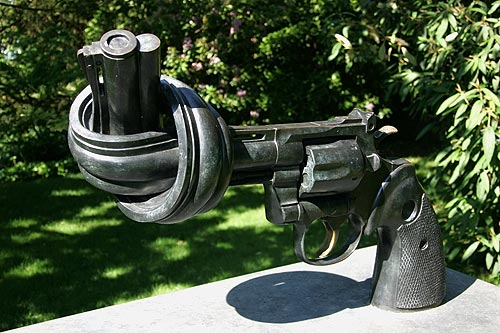
Non-Violence sculpture in the Olympic Park

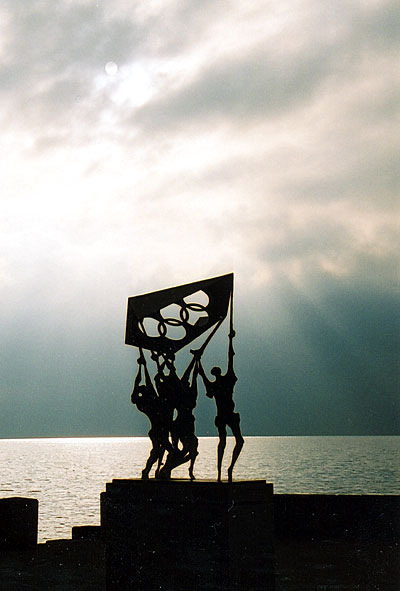
Statue in front of the museum, on the shore of Lake Léman

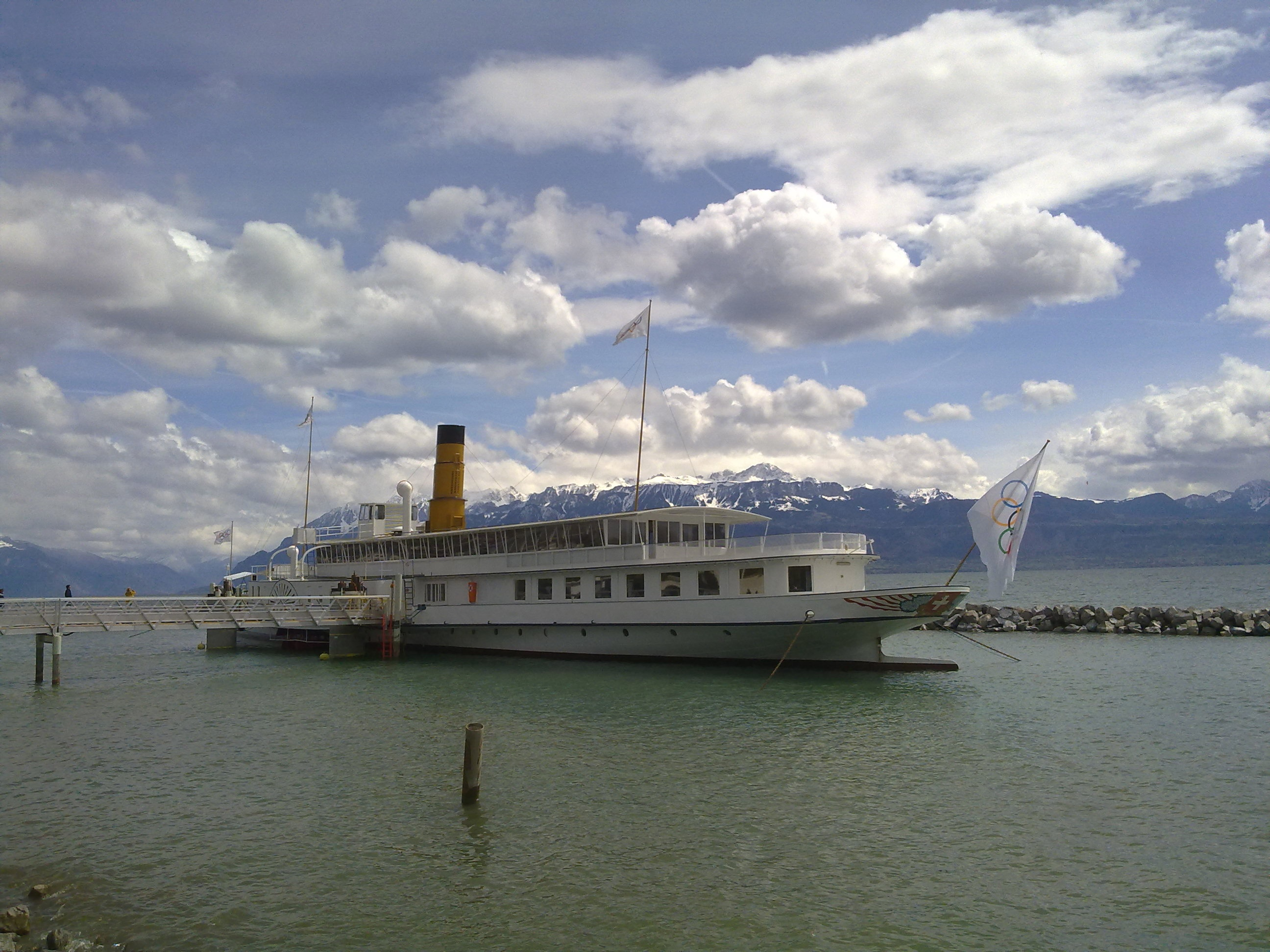
During the transformations of the building (until December 2013), a temporary exhibition is set up in this CGN boat, in front of the Olympic Park

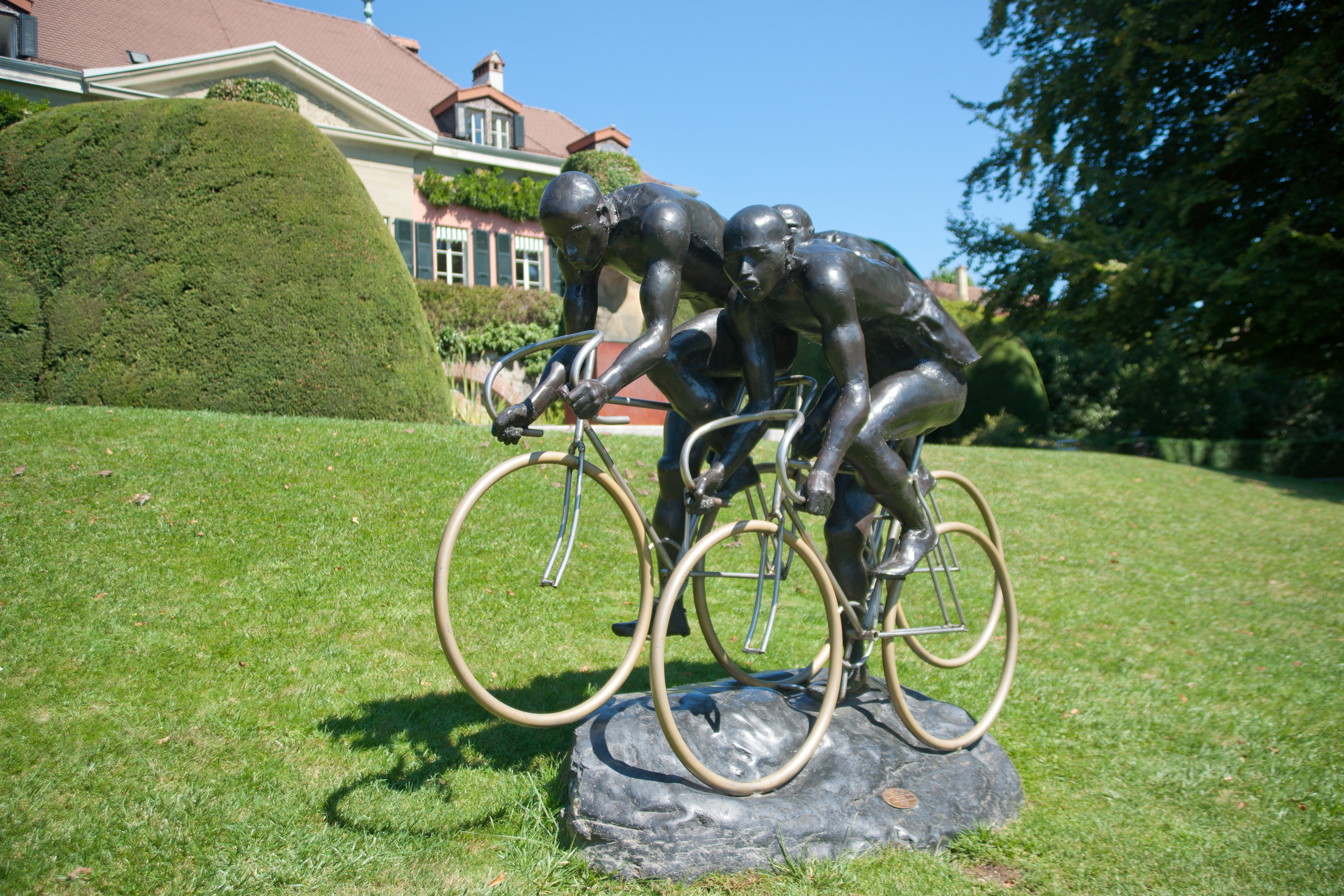
Cyclistes, sculpture by Gabor Mihaly

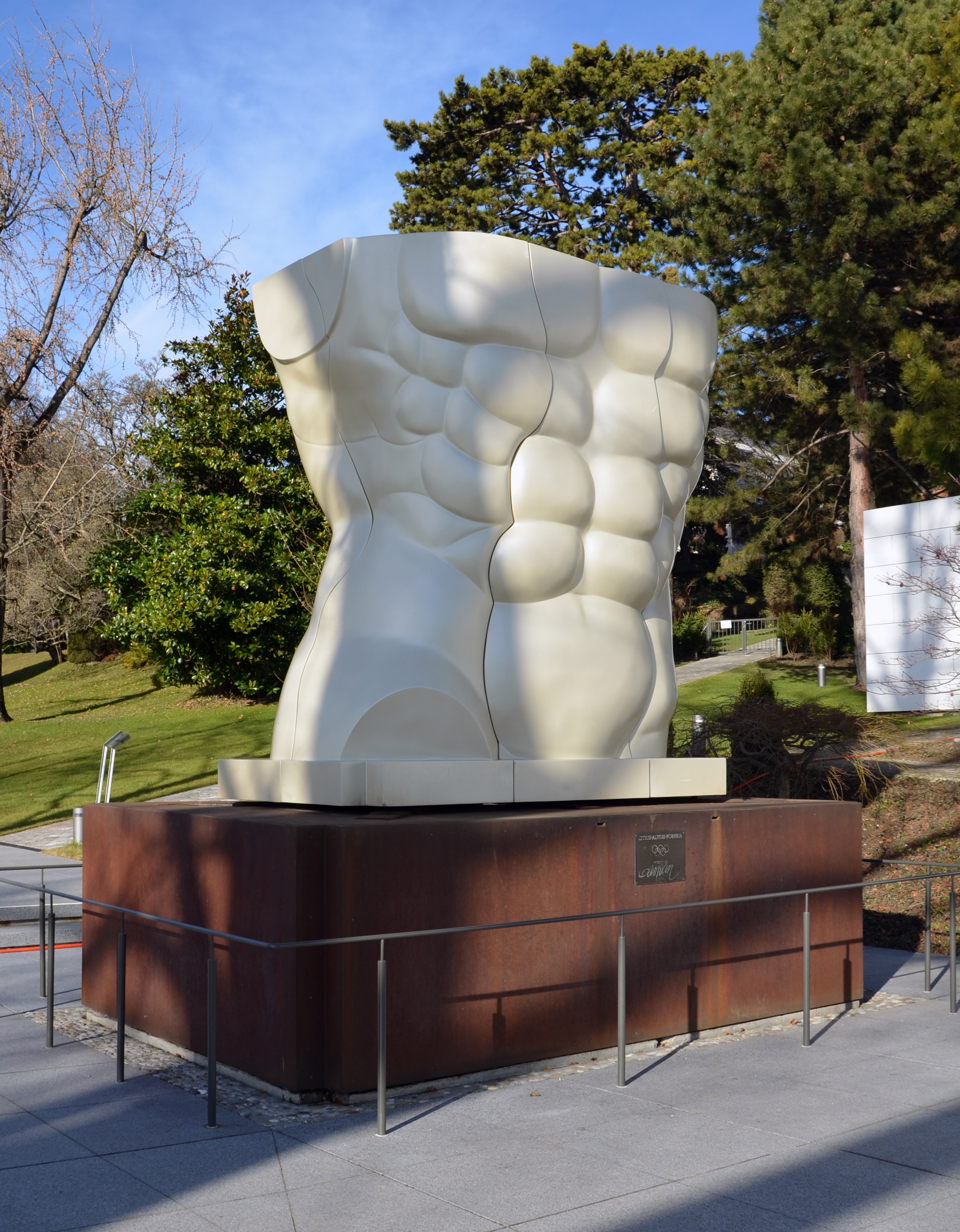
Citius, Altius, Fortius, sculpture by Miguel Ortiz Berrocal at the entrance to the Olympic Museum

== See also ==
- International Olympic Committee (IOC)
- List of museums in Switzerland
