= Thessaloniki Olympic Museum =

Olympic museum in Thessaloniki, Greece

Coordinates: 40.6273°N 22.9643°E

- Ολυμπιακό Μουσείο Θεσσαλονίκης
- Established: 1998
- Location: Thessaloniki, Greece
- Type: Sports museum
- Website: olympicmuseum-thessaloniki.org

Olympic Museums Network
- 3-2-1 Qatar Olympic and Sports Museum; Athens Olympic Museum; Brazilian Olympic Museum; Canadian Olympic Experience; China Sports Museum; Deutsches Sport & Olympia Museum; Estonian Sports Museum; Gothenburg Sports Museum; Joan Antoni Samaranch Olympic and Sport Museum; Museum of Sport and Tourism; Nagano Olympic Museum; Nanjing Olympic Museum; National Museum of Sports, Olympics and Paralympic Games; Norwegian Olympic Museum; The Olympic Experience; The Olympic Museum; Olympic Museum of Peruvian Sport; Samaranch Memorial Museum; Sapporo Olympic Museum; Seoul Olympic Museum; Singapore Youth Olympic Museum; Slovak Olympic and Sports Museum; Sportimonium; Sports Museum of Finland; Thessaloniki Olympic Museum; Tianjin D. Olympic Museum; United States Olympic & Paralympic Museum; Xiamen Olympic Museum

Thessaloniki Olympic Museum, the unique Olympic Museum of Greece, is situated at Thessaloniki, Central Macedonia, Greece. The museum is located on the confluence and educational, athletic and cultural routes of the city. It stands next to the Kaftanzoglio National Stadium and the Aristotle University.

== History ==
The museum was established in 1998 with the name “Sports Museum” – being the unique sports museum in Greece – with the support of the Ministry of Culture, the Special Secretariat for Sports of Macedonia–Thrace, Athletic Unions, and Associations of Local Authorities.

The aim of the museum is to collect, conserve, record and establish the sport history and to promote it in an active and vivid place, having a mainly educative character. Since its establishment and until 2004, the museum was housed on the floor of a neo-classical building, where the limited space – that was accorded by the Hellenic Railways Organization (OSE) – of 300 m^{2}, constrained its exhibitional and educational activities.

During Olympic Year 2004, the museum relocated to a new building primarily designed to serve its needs into the building block of the Kaftanzoglio Stadium, which hosted the preliminary games of the Athens Olympic Games 2004. The new building was inaugurated by the then president of the International Olympic Committee, Jacques Rogge. It is a modern building, of 4500 m^{2}, which was designed and constructed according to the specifications that sets the modern museological architecture.

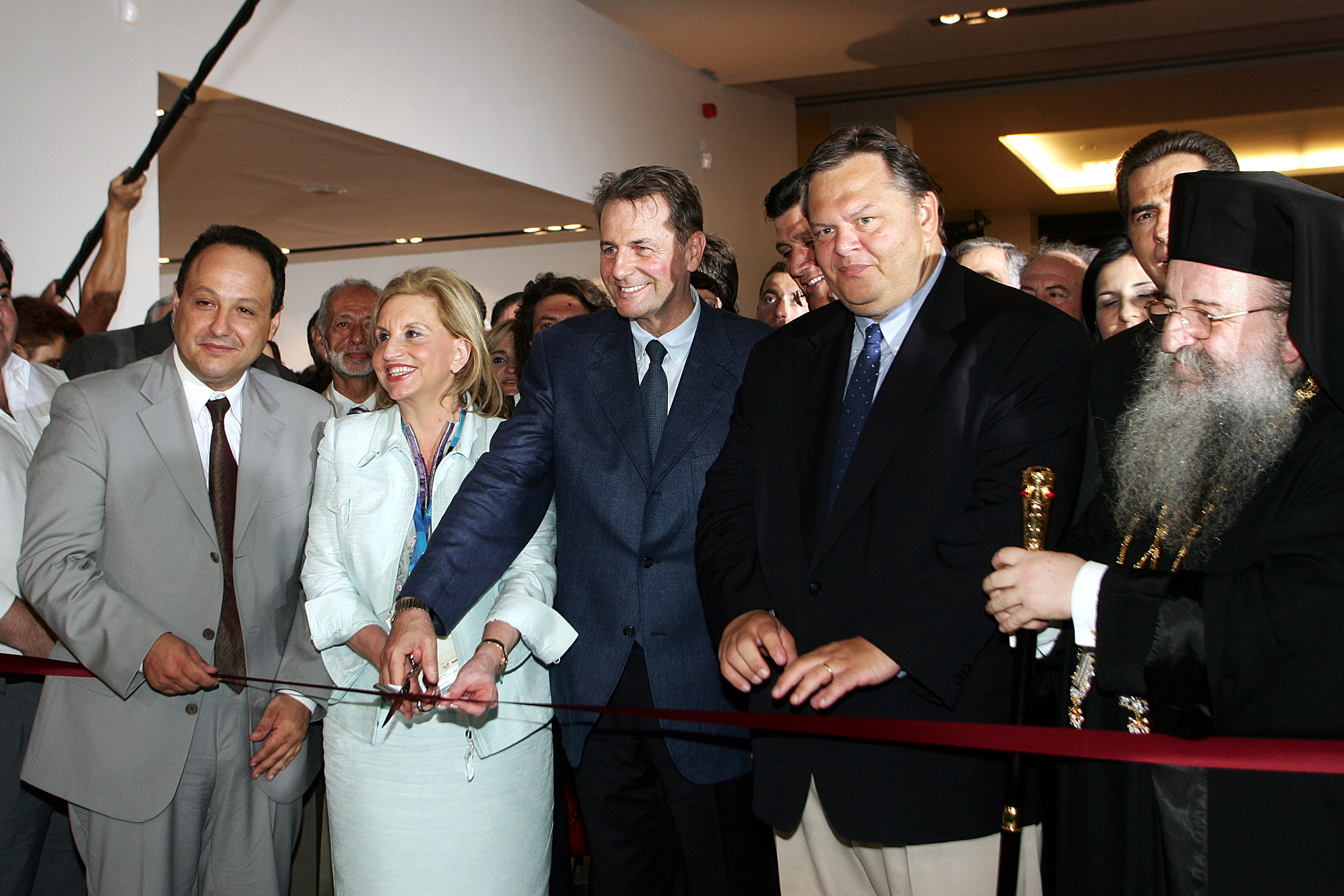
Inauguration of the museum

On January 30, the International Olympic Committee, after the proposal from the Hellenic Olympic Committee and acknowledging its contribution to the athletic and cultural section, renamed the museum “Thessaloniki Olympic Museum.” The organizing of the first permanent exhibition dedicated to Olympic Games and Olympic Sports was the immediate priority of the new exhibition policy. The exhibition consists of historical records and objects of the Greek Medalists, medals, torches, memorabilia from the Olympic organizations and athletic equipment. The new mission of the museum is not only recording and promoting of the sport heritage but the conservation and prominence of the national Olympic history and of the Olympic ideal.

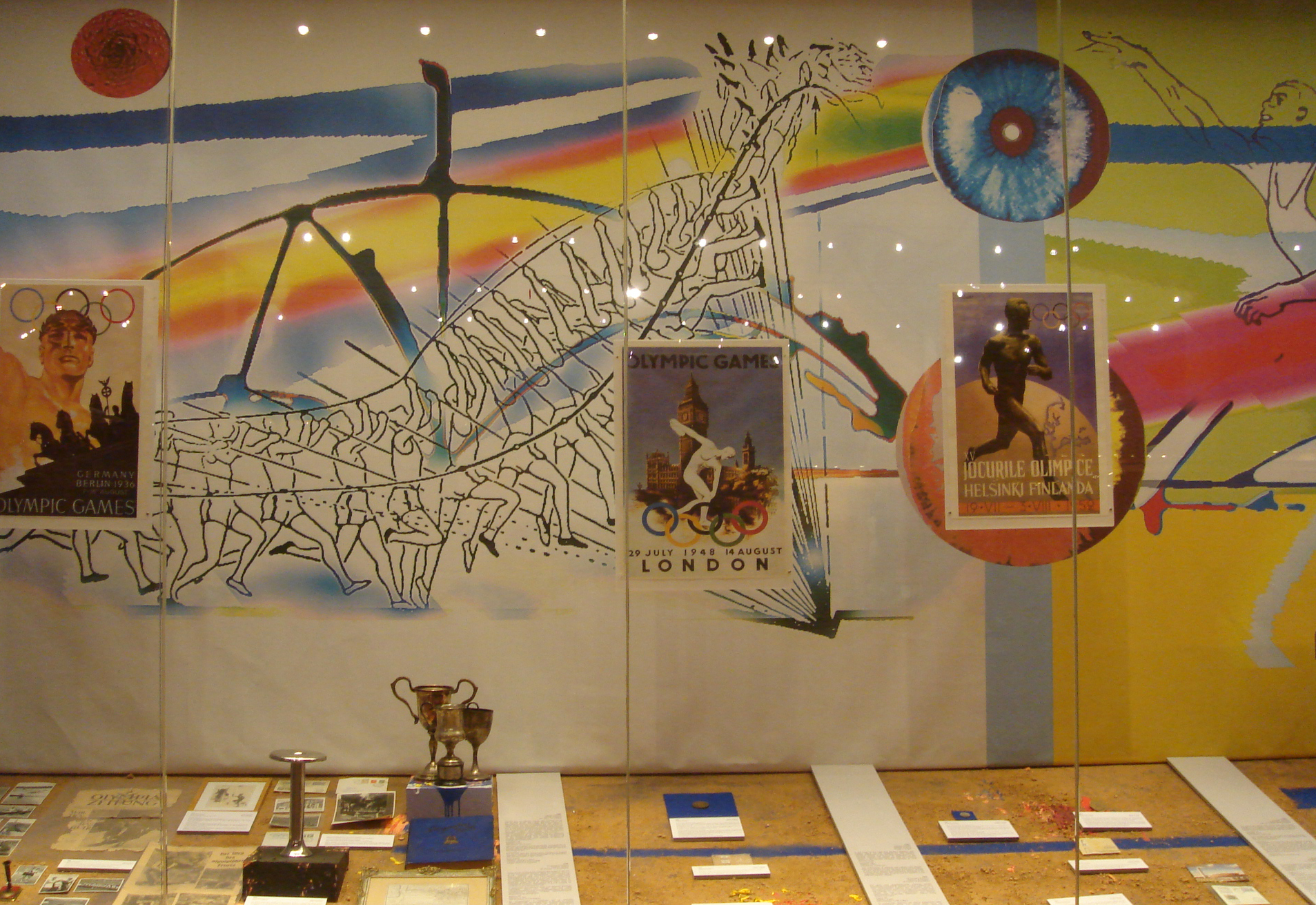
Main exhibition

Thessaloniki Olympic Museum consists of four exhibition halls (permanent exhibition dedicated to Olympic Games titled “Prominence of Sport History and Olympic Ideal”, permanent machine interactive exhibition titled “Science of Sports”, permanent exhibition hall housing a parallel exhibition and simulation of track and field stadium and finally, exhibition hall of temporary exhibitions). All exhibition halls conclude recreation ground for educational programs and workshops. Furthermore, the museum has communal halls, an amphitheatre with 300 seats, two halls of manifold uses, shop and a large foyer where temporary exhibitions of small scale and events can be housed.

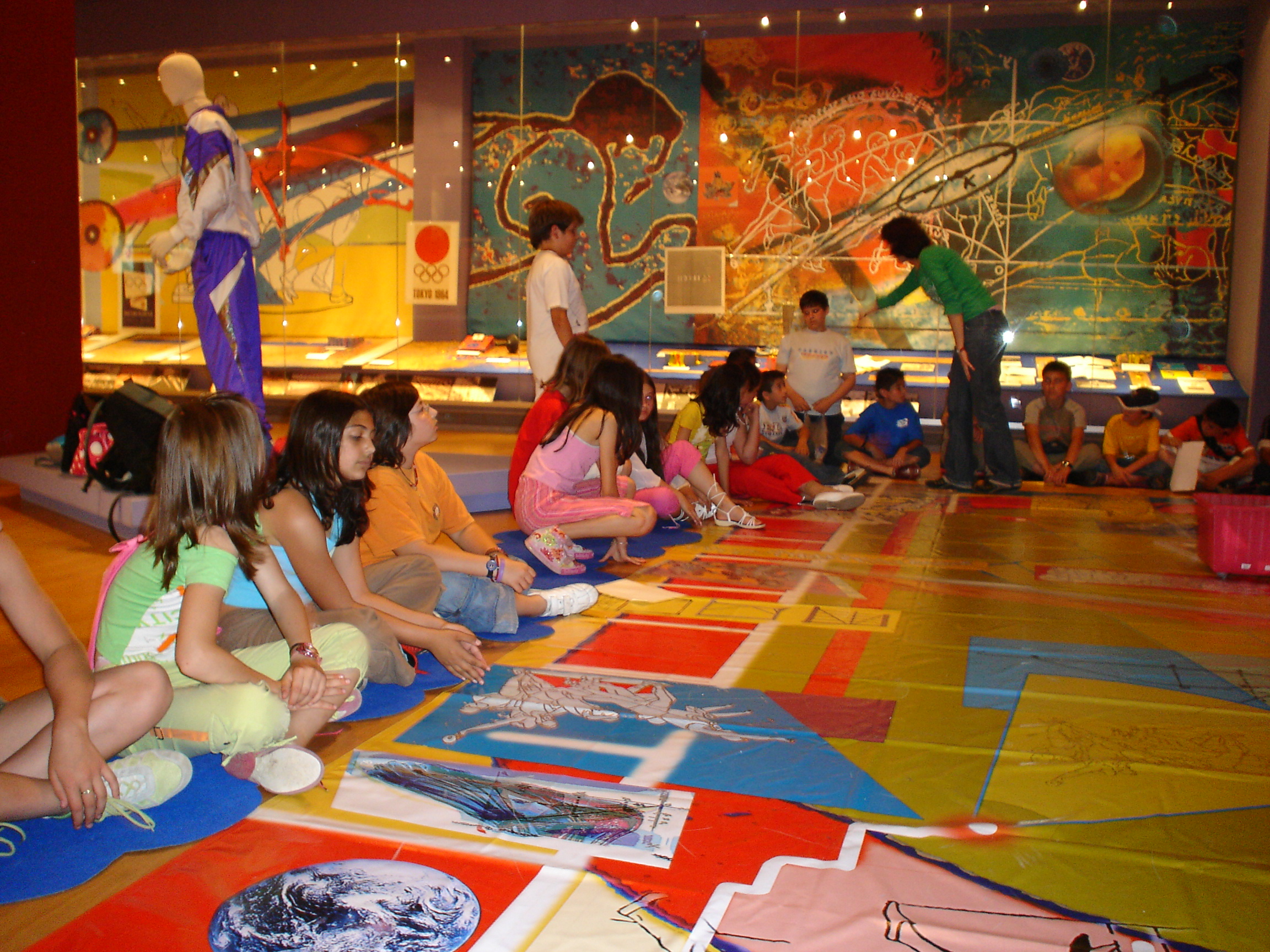
Educational Programs

The new building standards resulted in the redeployment of the museum's missions and in the organization of the permanent Olympic and sport collection, that consists of donations of personal belongings from Greek athletes that have excelled in their sport section, athletic federations, private collections, independent collectors, etc. The new policy on collection of the museum is centered to the presentation of exhibitions which are always focused on the triptych “body, spirit and soul” with athletic, historic and cultural interest. The exhibitions that have been produced are divided in long-term exhibitions, temporary exhibitions, interactive and artistic exhibitions of further interest.

One of the primary aims of Thessaloniki Olympic Museum is to approach young people and children, promoting the museum as a friendly place and converting a visit to a pleasant experience. Every exhibition is supported by a variety of educational programs, while educational workshops are performed on weekends, summer workshops and theatrical classes.

Being a modern cultural institution pays great attention to new technologies and their uses in the museum's policy in collections, exhibitions and communication. In 2007, a digital tour in the “Track and Field” exhibition was created while two other interactive exhibitions, “Paralympics” and “Medals and Torches” can be found in the website of the museum.

The communication of Thessaloniki Olympic Museum with the public is achieved through its newsletter and monthly electronic information. Moreover, the museum publishes catalogues from its exhibitions and transcripts from its conferences.

The museum has developed a variety of collaborations with Cultural Institutions and European or International Museums. More specifically, Thessaloniki Olympic Museum is member of the International Sport Heritage Association (I.S.H.A.), of International Council of Museums (I.C.O.M.) and from 2007, member of Olympic Museum Network. It has also developed international collaborations with representatives of administration of sport cultural heritage of Europe and Balkans that were consummated through memorandums of collaboration.

== Exhibitions ==
=== Permanent exhibition ===
- Olympic Games

=== Long-term temporary exhibitions / Great Exhibition Productions ===
- Chess and its History (15/1/ 1998 – 28/2/1999)
- Greek Medalists Exhibition: "1896-1996…100 years of Modern Olympic Games" (24/3/2000 – 23/7/2000)
- Nautical Sports Exhibition – Canoe-kayak" (2/12/2001 – 2/12/2002)
- Football Exhibition: "Greek and International Football History" (5/8/2004 – 5/8/2005)
- Track and Field Exhibition: "On your marks…" – (3/3/2006 – 15/7/2008)

=== Exhibitions of historical interest ===
- Ancient Stadium and Games in Antiquity (5/11/2005 – 5/10/2007)
- Testimonies and Stamps from International Olympic Games, Athens 1906 (16 – 30/6/ 2006)
- Ancient Theaters of East Mediterranean (21/11/2007 – 30/6/2009)

=== Artistic exhibitions ===
- Dinner / action 32 (15/10/2007 – 10/11/2007)

=== Travel exhibitions ===
- Ancient Stadium and Games in Antiquity
- Ancient Theaters of East Mediterranean

=== Interactive exhibitions ===
- Science of Sports’ (From 27/6/2007)

=== Digital interactive exhibitions ===
- Paralympics (From 13/3/2009)
- Medals and Torches (From 13/3/2009)
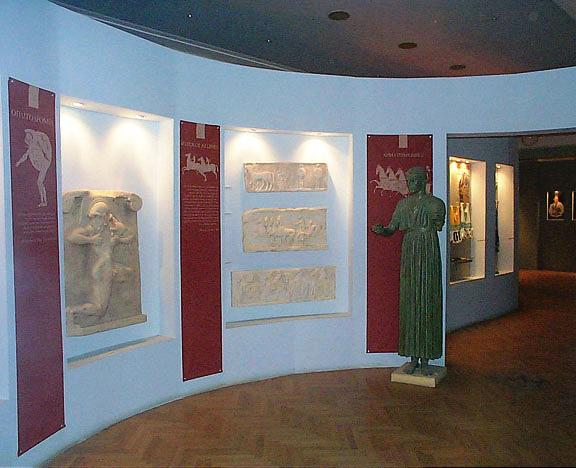
The entrance room

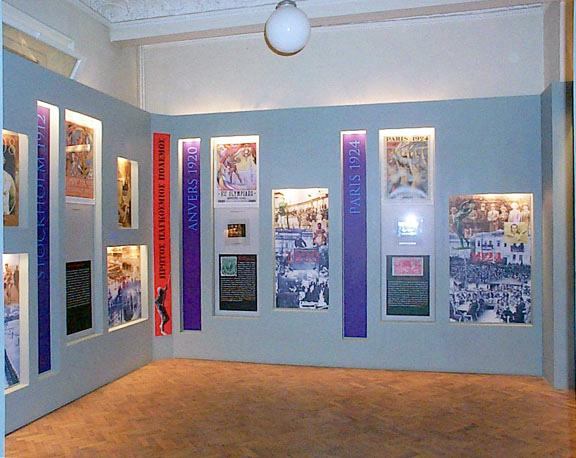
Part of exhibition 100 Years of Olympic Games

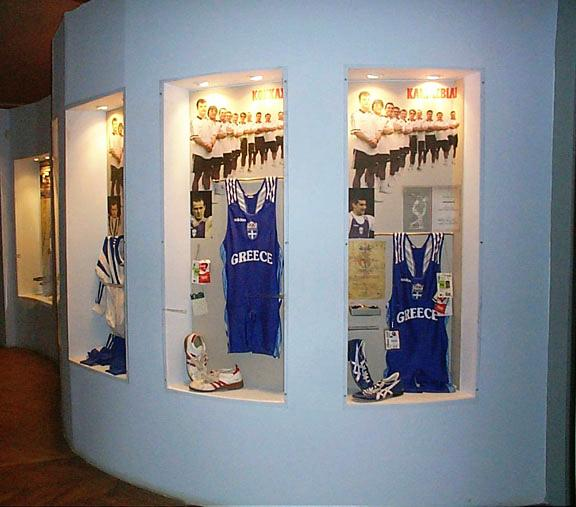
Personal objects belonging to the Greek medallists

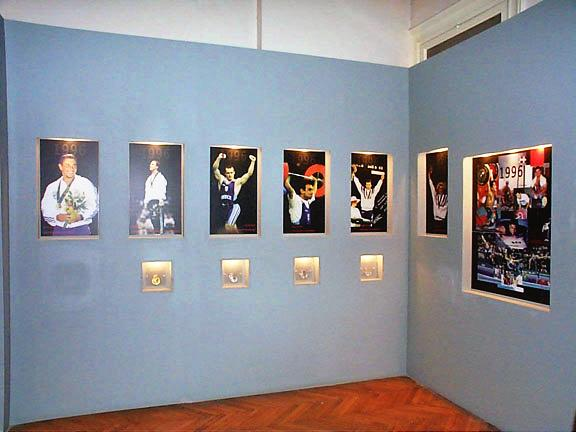
Portraits of the Greek medallists in Atlanta 1996

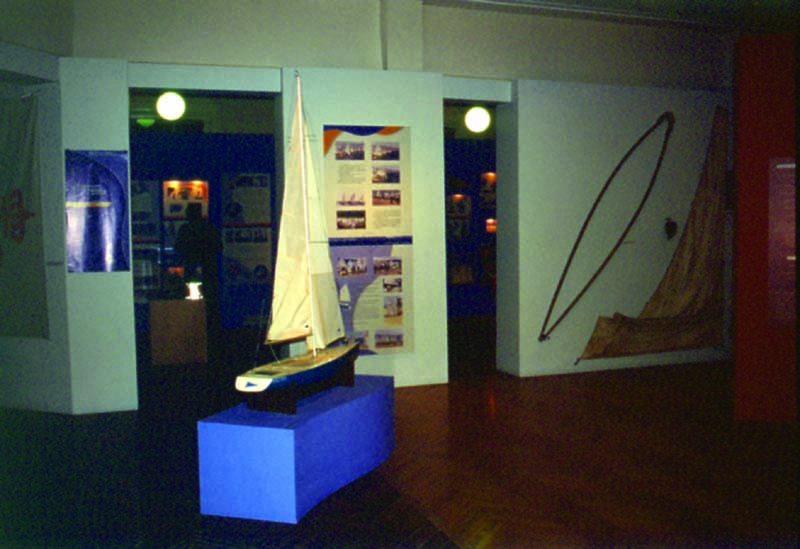
Model of Sailing Ship
