= United States Olympic & Paralympic Museum =

Coordinates: 38.8295°N 104.8296°W

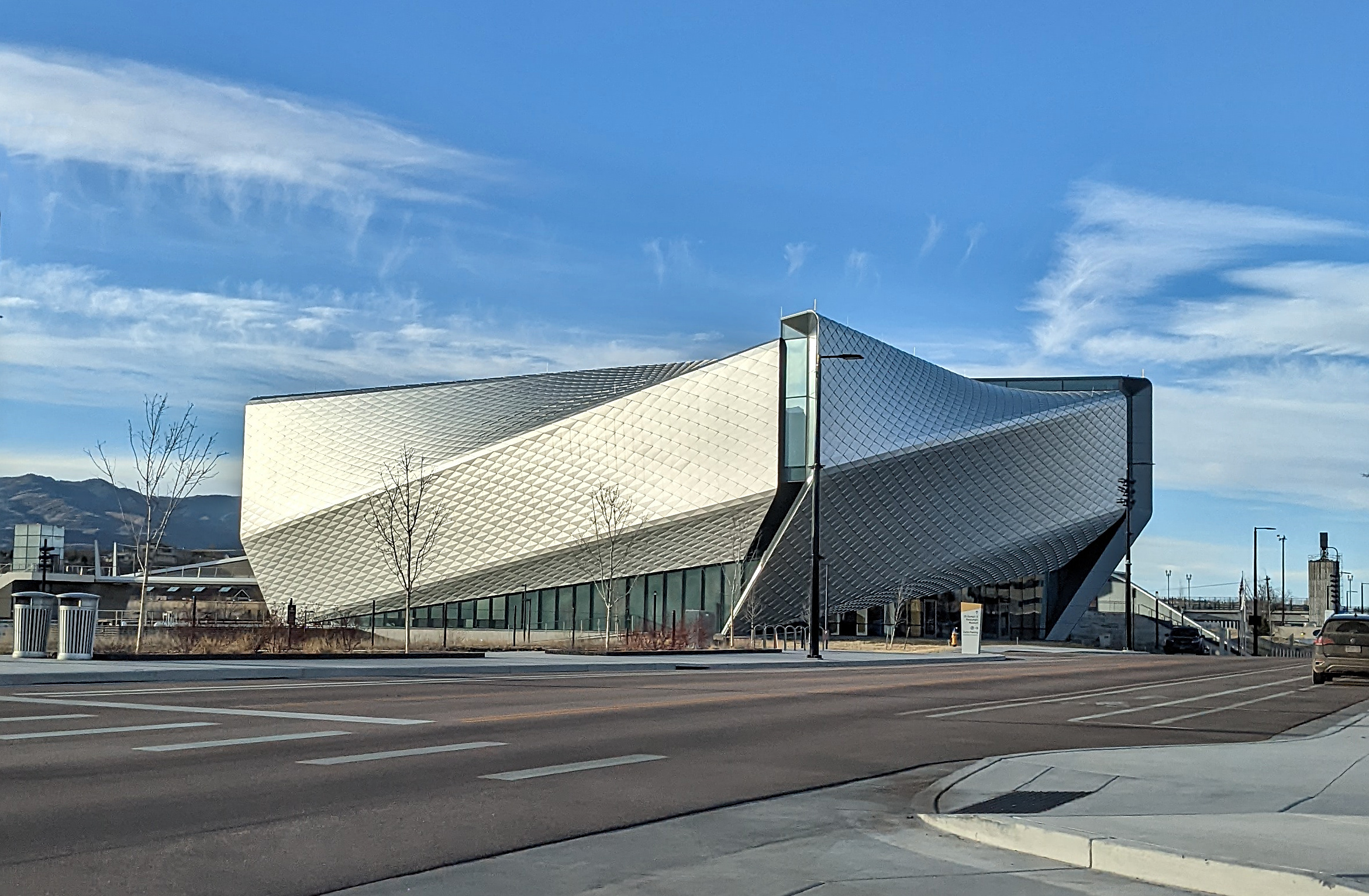
- United States Olympic & Paralympic Museum as pictured in 2023
- Established: July 30, 2020
- Location: Colorado Springs, U.S.
- Type: Sports museum
- CEO: Marisa Wigglesworth
- Architect: Diller Scofidio + Renfro
- Website: usopm.org

Olympic Museums Network
- 3-2-1 Qatar Olympic and Sports Museum; Athens Olympic Museum; Brazilian Olympic Museum; Canadian Olympic Experience; China Sports Museum; Deutsches Sport & Olympia Museum; Estonian Sports Museum; Gothenburg Sports Museum; Joan Antoni Samaranch Olympic and Sport Museum; Museum of Sport and Tourism; Nagano Olympic Museum; Nanjing Olympic Museum; National Museum of Sports, Olympics and Paralympic Games; Norwegian Olympic Museum; The Olympic Experience; The Olympic Museum; Olympic Museum of Peruvian Sport; Samaranch Memorial Museum; Sapporo Olympic Museum; Seoul Olympic Museum; Singapore Youth Olympic Museum; Slovak Olympic and Sports Museum; Sportimonium; Sports Museum of Finland; Thessaloniki Olympic Museum; Tianjin D. Olympic Museum; United States Olympic & Paralympic Museum; Xiamen Olympic Museum

The United States Olympic & Paralympic Museum (USOPM) is a historical and cultural sports museum located in Colorado Springs, Colorado, United States, first opened on July 30, 2020. The museum is part of the City for Champions development project in Colorado Springs, though it licenses the Olympic name and operates separately from the United States Olympic & Paralympic Committee (USOPC). The museum recognizes Olympic and Paralympic athletes who have represented Team USA.

== History ==
Groundbreaking for the museum was held on June 9, 2017. As the home of the United States Olympic & Paralympic Committee (USOPC), the first and main United States Olympic Training Center, and two dozen National Governing Bodies, Colorado Springs is an ideal home for the museum. The museum has a licensing agreement with the USOPC.

== Description ==
The $91 million, 60,000-square-foot (5,600 m^{2}) museum is dedicated to American Olympic and Paralympic athletes and their stories. Museum guests purchase entry passes then proceed to an elevator that goes to the third floor. From there, inspired by the Guggenheim Museum, a ramped path winds downwards through several museum galleries, the theater, and gift shop on the main floor. There are no steps.

The museum is notably accessible (it is fully ADA compliant) and interactive, designed so guests of all abilities can see all the exhibitions and participate equally. Some of the technologies implemented include captions, descriptive audio tracks, ASL translations, assisted listening, RFID-enabled guest lanyards (e.g. text is automatically enlarged for visually-disabled visitors), and accessible exhibition spaces and paths. Team USA athletes were involved and consulted throughout the project. Gallagher & Associates designed the museum's exhibitions.

The USOPM was designed by Diller Scofidio + Renfro with an eye toward creating a building in motion; an overhead view of the building resembles a discus thrower in mid-throw. The exterior of the museum is composed of 9,000 unique diamond-shaped reflective aluminum panels, with no two panels exactly alike.

It is located in the southwest part of downtown Colorado Springs, at the intersection of S. Sierra Madre Street and W. Vermijo Avenue.

=== Notable holdings and exhibitions ===
- Complete set of Olympic Torches (1936–present)
- A complete set of Olympic medals
- Artworks by LeRoy Neiman
- Interactive sports demonstrations (30-meter dash, alpine skiing, archery, goalball, skeleton, and sled hockey)
- Simulated Parade of Nations

== See also ==
- United States Olympic & Paralympic Hall of Fame
- Lake Placid Winter Olympic Museum
- Eccles Salt Lake 2002 Olympic Winter Games Museum
- Museum of Sierra Ski History and 1960 Winter Olympics
