= Marquessate of Samaranch =

Hereditary title of Spanish nobility

- Creation date: 30 December 1991
- Created by: Juan Carlos I of Spain
- First holder: Juan Antonio Samaranch
- Present holder: María Teresa Samaranch Salisachs
- Remainder to: Absolute primogeniture

Coat of arms of the 1st Marquess of Samaranch

The Marquessate of Samaranch (Spanish: Marquesado de Samaranch) is a hereditary title of Spanish nobility. The title was bestowed by King Juan Carlos I of Spain on Juan Antonio Samaranch on 30 December 1991, honouring his efforts in support of the Olympic movement as President of the International Olympic Committee.

== Holders of the title ==
- Juan Antonio Samaranch, 1st Marquess of Samaranch (1991–2010)
- María Teresa Samaranch Salisachs, 2nd Marchioness of Samaranch (2011–)
