= Juan Antonio Samaranch =

President of the IOC from 1980 to 2001

The Most Excellent The Marquess of Samaranch
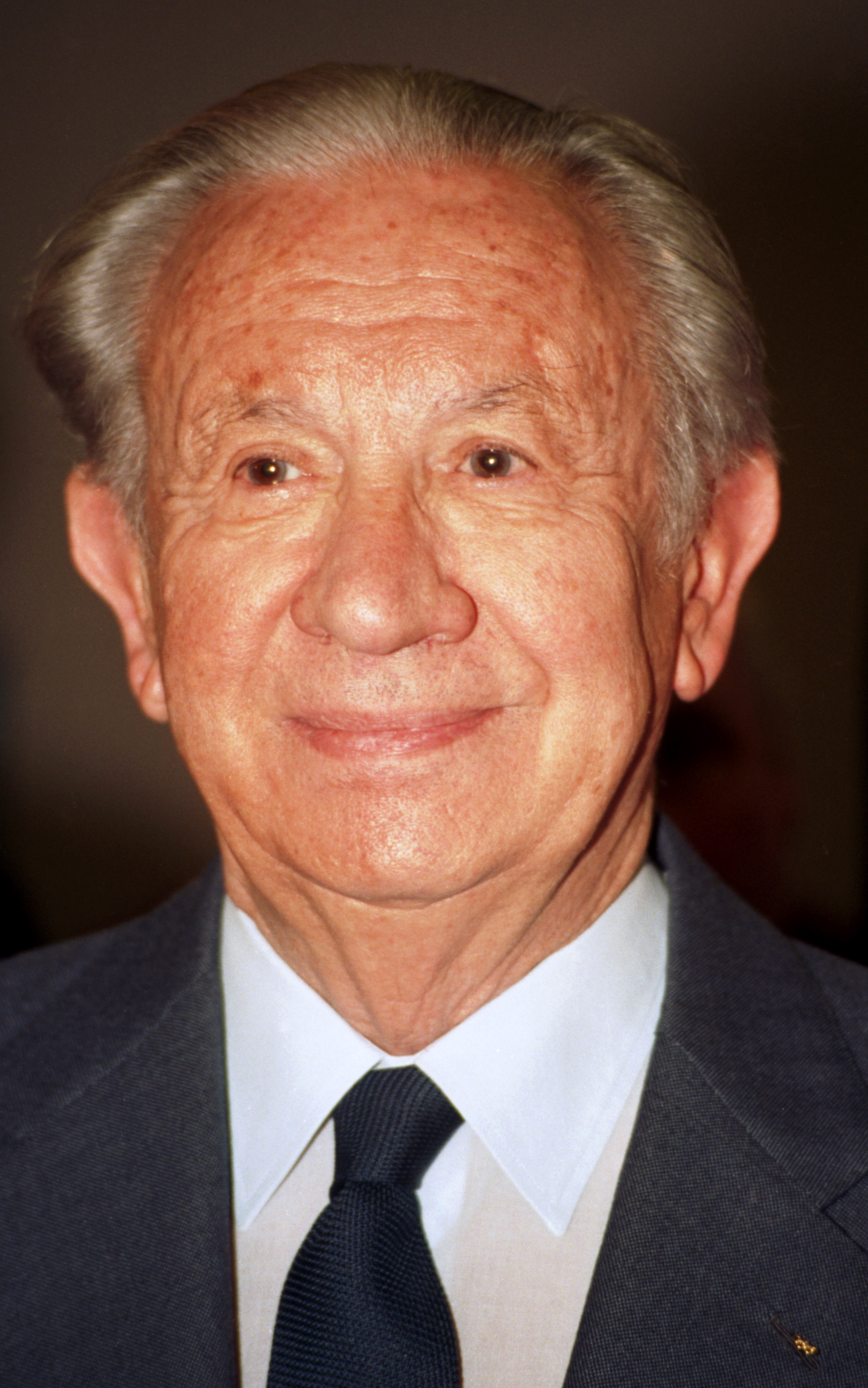
- Samaranch in 1998

7th President of the International Olympic Committee
- In office 3 August 1980 – 16 July 2001
- Preceded by: Lord Killanin
- Succeeded by: Jacques Rogge

Honorary President of the International Olympic Committee
- In office 16 July 2001 – 21 April 2010
- President: Jacques Rogge
- Preceded by: Vacant, last held by Lord Killanin (1999)
- Succeeded by: Vacant, next held by Jacques Rogge (2013)

Personal details
- Born: 17 July 1920 Barcelona, Spain
- Died: 21 April 2010 (aged 89) Barcelona, Spain
- Spouse: María Teresa Salisachs Rowe (m. 1955; died 2000)
- Children: 2, including Juan Antonio
- Education: IESE, Universidad de Navarra
- Occupation: Sports administrator Diplomat

Juan Antonio Samaranch y Torelló, 1st Marquess of Samaranch (Note: In this Spanish name, the first or paternal surname is Samaranch and the second or maternal family name is Torelló.) (Catalan: Joan Antoni Samaranch i Torelló, Catalan pronunciation: [ʒuˈan ənˈtɔni səməˈɾaŋ]; 17 July 1920 – 21 April 2010) was a Spanish sports administrator under the Franco regime (1973–1977) who served as the seventh president of the International Olympic Committee (IOC) from 1980 to 2001.

== Life ==
Juan Antonio Samaranch was born on 17 July 1920 in Barcelona as the third of six children in a wealthy Catalan family. In 1938, during the Spanish Civil War, he was conscripted to serve as a medical assistant in the Spanish Republican Armed Forces. Samaranch's political sympathies were for the Nationalists, and he deserted to Nationalist-held territory by way of France. On 1 December 1955, he married Maria Teresa Salisachs Rowe. With Salisachs Rowe, he had two children: Juan Antonio Junior, currently a member of the International Olympic Committee, and Maria Teresa.

Samaranch started his studies at the Business School of Barcelona, which he completed in London and the US, and obtained a diploma from the Barcelona Higher Institute of Business Studies (IESE). During his studies, he practised roller hockey, for which he created World Championships in 1951 and which the Spanish team won. A member of the Falange in Francoist Spain, Samaranch held various political positions in municipal and national government: he became a city councilor for the city of Barcelona responsible for sport in 1954, then delegate for physical education and sport in the Spanish Parliament in 1967. Samaranch was appointed president of the provincial council of Barcelona in 1973, until he resigned four years later, when he was appointed Ambassador of Spain to the Soviet Union and Mongolia after the resumption of diplomatic relations between the two countries.

Maintaining an active career within the Olympic Movement, Samaranch was elected vice-president of the International Mediterranean Games Committee for the second edition of the Games in Barcelona in 1955. On several occasions, he was appointed Chef de Mission: for the Winter Games in Cortina d'Ampezzo (1956), the Summer Games in Rome (1960), and the Summer Games in Tokyo (1964). For the Rome and Tokyo Games, he was also president of the Spanish delegation. Elected a member of the Spanish Olympic Committee in 1956, he became its president in 1967 until 1970. He was elected as an IOC member in 1966. Two years later, Avery Brundage appointed him head of protocol (1968–1975 and 1979–1980). A member of the executive board (1970–1978 and 1979–1980), he was IOC vice-president from 1974 to 1978. Elected to the IOC presidency in the first round of voting on 16 July 1980 at the 83rd Session, he succeeded Lord Killanin on 3 August that year.

Samaranch acceded to the IOC presidency during the troubled political period of the Games of the XXII Olympiad in Moscow. He sought to defend the Olympic movement and raise its profile on his numerous trips and meetings with heads of state and sports leaders. In 1981, he obtained for the IOC the status of non-governmental international organisation and became the first IOC President, after Pierre de Coubertin, to establish himself in Lausanne. He was also in favour of the integration of women into the Olympic Movement, and during the Baden-Baden Congress gained permission for women to become members of the IOC. At his instigation, the IOC became involved in various initiatives to promote women and sport.

Samaranch managed to include both the NOC of the People's Republic of China and that of Chinese Taipei; with the assistance of Kéba Mbaye, he contributed to the reintegration of South Africa into the Olympics after the abolition of apartheid; he visited Sarajevo during the civil war to express Olympic solidarity; and the two Koreas marched under the same flag at the opening ceremony in Sydney.

For sport, he intensified the IOC's support to organise Paralympic Games as from the Winter Games in Sarajevo in 1984. He also made doping a priority issue by launching research and control programmes. The creation of the World Anti-Doping Agency in 1999 allowed the IOC Medical Commission to extend its scope of action. He also full opening of the Olympic Games to the best athletes regardless of their status. Finally, it was under his presidency that the Summer and Winter Games were organised two years apart, instead of in the same year.

Among the reforms to the running of the IOC, he imposed a new financial policy which allowed for the increase in revenues and the diversification of resources. Thanks to a large share of the revenues generated by agreements with TV channels, he restructured Olympic Solidarity in 1981 and provided assistance to National Olympic Committees in difficulty, and developed action plans to contribute to the universality of the Games.

In 1991 he received the title of Marqués from the King of Spain for his involvement in the Olympic Movement. On 23 June 1993, the inauguration of the Olympic Museum, representing the memory and spirit of modern Olympism, the work of his career, crowned his presidency. On 16 July 2001, he left the seat of the IOC presidency to Jacques Rogge. Samaranch became Honorary Life President of the IOC and was awarded the Gold Olympic Order upon standing down from the presidency. The IOC also voted to change the name of the Olympic Museum to the Samaranch Museum.

Samaranch was a devout Catholic and was a supernumerary (lay member) of Opus Dei. He died on 21 April 2010 at the age of 89, in Barcelona.

== Business and political career ==
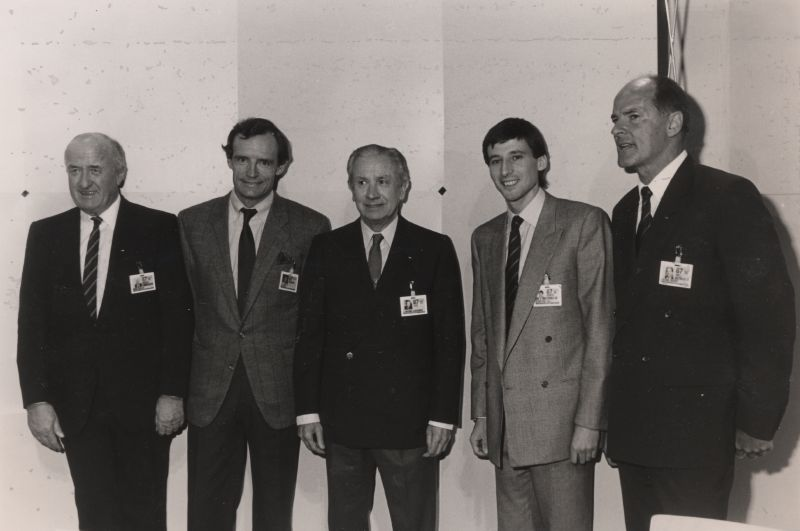
Samaranch (middle) at the World Economic Forum Annual Meeting in 1987

After actively participating in the Spanish Civil War, Samaranch studied commerce at IESE Business School in Barcelona. He had a short career as a sports journalist for La Prensa, which ended in his dismissal in 1943 for criticising the supporters of Real Madrid C.F. after that club's 11–1 defeat of FC Barcelona, and then joined his family's textile business. He joined the board of La Caixa, Spain's largest savings bank, in 1984, and served as president of the board from 1987 to 1999. He remained as honorary president from his retirement in 1999 to his death.

Samaranch served on the municipal government of Barcelona, with responsibility for sports, from 1955 to 1962. He was a procurador (member of the lower house) of the Cortes Españolas during the last decade of the Franco regime, from 1964 until the restoration of democracy in 1977. From 1967 to 1971, he also served as "national delegate" (minister) for sports, and from 1973 to 1977 he was the president of the diputación (governing council) of the Province of Barcelona. He was appointed ambassador of Spain to the Soviet Union and Mongolia in 1977, immediately after the restoration of diplomatic relations between the countries: this post helped him to gain the support of the Soviet bloc countries in the election to the presidency of the IOC, held in Moscow in 1980.

He had been the chef de mission of the Spanish team at a number of Olympic events, before he was appointed Government Secretary for Sports by Spanish Head of State Francisco Franco in 1967. He also became the president of the Spanish National Olympic Committee and a member of the IOC. He was vice-president of the IOC from 1974 to 1978.

== IOC Presidency ==
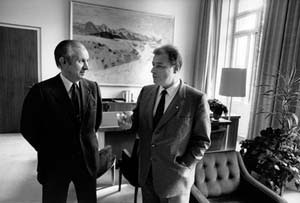
Samaranch (left) and Jean-Pascal Delamuraz (c. 1982–1984)

Samaranch became President elect in 1980 at the 83rd IOC Session (15–18 July) which was held in Moscow prior to the 1980 Summer Olympics—and took office soon after the Games. During his term, Samaranch oversaw the Olympic Games returned to financial health, with big television deals and sponsorships established through the efforts of Dick Pound, President of the Canadian Olympic Committee. Although the 1984 Summer Olympics were still boycotted by the Soviet bloc, 140 National Olympic Committees took part in those Games, a record number at the time, and the number of participating member nations increased at every Games during Samaranch's presidency. Samaranch also wanted the best athletes to compete in the Olympics, which led to the gradual acceptance of professional athletes as opposed to amateurs or state-funded athletes, as was the case with the Soviet Union. He was awarded the 1990 Seoul Peace Prize. It became a tradition for Samaranch, when giving the president's address at the close of each Summer Olympics, to praise the organisers at each Olympiad for putting on "the best ever" Games.

In 2001, Samaranch did not apply for the presidency again. He was succeeded by Jacques Rogge. He then became honorary president for life of the International Olympic Committee. Samaranch served the second-longest term as the head of the IOC, 21 years, the longest being that of Pierre de Coubertin (29 years). Following his retirement, Samaranch played a major role in Madrid's bid for the 2012 and 2016 Olympics, though both were unsuccessful. In 1991, he was raised into the Spanish nobility by King Juan Carlos of Spain and given the hereditary title of Marqués de Samaranch (Marquess of Samaranch), this in recognition of his contribution to the Olympic movement.

Autocratic Samaranch, who always insisted on being addressed as "Your Excellency", governed the IOC "essentially by executive fiat".

== Family ==
Samaranch married María Teresa Salisachs Rowe, known as "Bibí" (26 December 1931 – 16 September 2000), on 1 December 1955. She died in Spain while he was attending the 2000 Summer Olympics in Sydney. Two children were born of this marriage: his elder child and daughter, María Teresa Samaranch Salisachs (born 1956), has been president of the Spanish Federation of Sports on Ice since 2005, while his younger child and son, Juan Antonio Samaranch Salisachs (born 1959), has been a member of the International Olympic Committee since 2001.

== Death and legacy ==
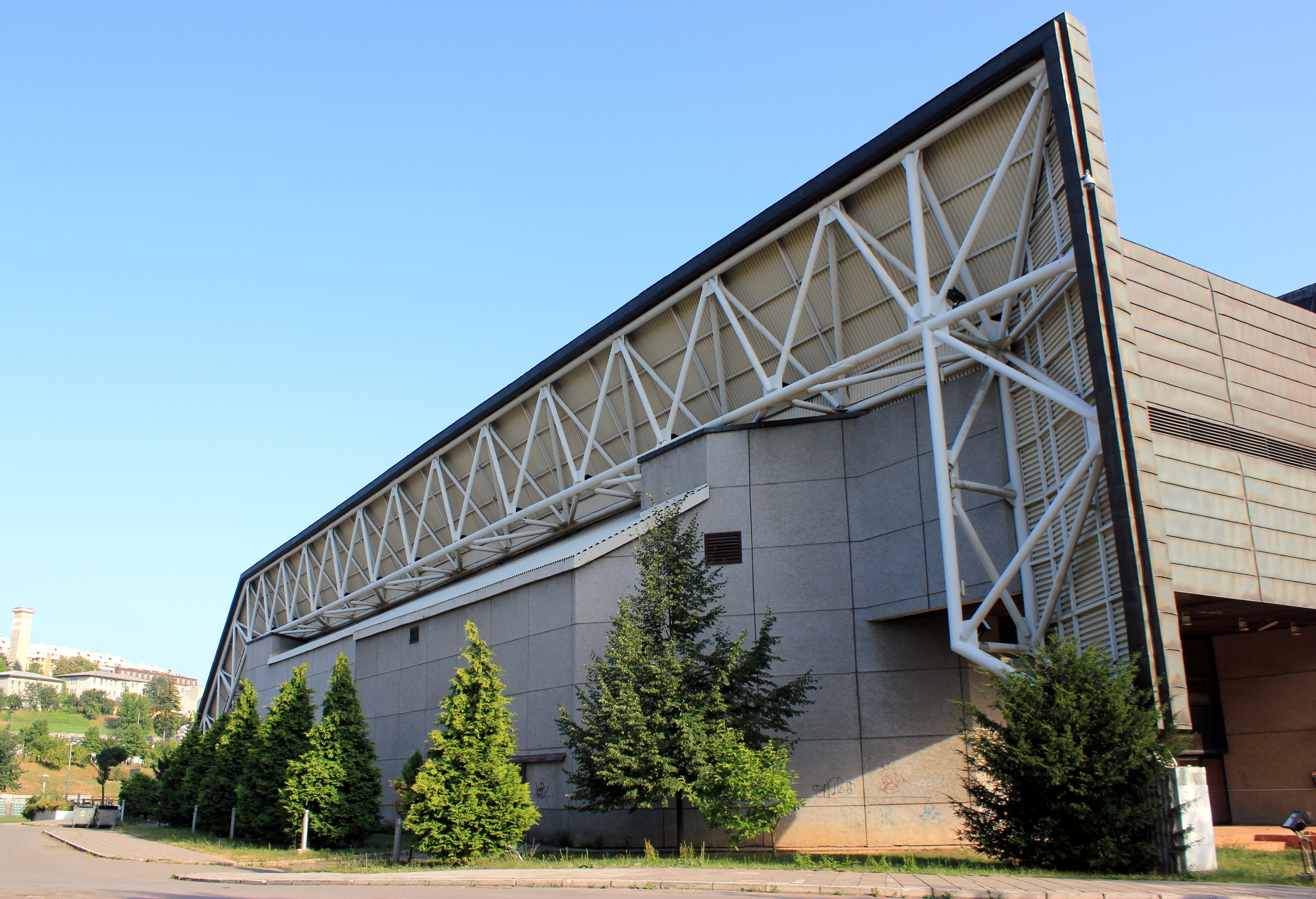
Juan Antonio Samaranch Olympic Hall, formerly Zetra Olympic Hall, in Sarajevo, Bosnia and Herzegovina

Samaranch died of cardio-respiratory failure in the Hospital Quirón in Barcelona on 21 April 2010, having suffered ill health for several years prior. As a recipient of the Gold Medal of the Generalitat de Catalunya, Samaranch was laid-in-state in the Palau de la Generalitat. His funeral mass was held in the Cathedral of Santa Eulalia, on 22 April 2010 and was attended by representatives of the Spanish royal family and of the Olympic movement. He was buried at the Montjuïc Cemetery. After his death, in June 2010, the Joan Antoni Samaranch Olympic and Sport Museum and the Juan Antonio Samaranch Olympic Hall, formerly Zetra Olympic Hall, in Sarajevo, Bosnia and Herzegovina, were renamed in his honour.

== Honours and awards ==
=== National honours ===
- Spain:
  - In 1991, created 1st Marquess of Samaranch by royal decree
  - Knight Grand Cross of the Order of Charles III (20 October 1980)
  - Order of Isabella the Catholic
    - Knight Grand Cross (29 September 1975)
    - Collar (31 March 2000)
  - Knight Grand Cross of the Order of Civil Merit (1 April 1959)
  - Grand Cross of the Order of Cisneros (1 October 1968)
  - Grand Cross of the Royal Order of Sports Merit (5 December 1986)
  - Gold Medal of the Generalitat de Catalunya (1985)

=== Foreign honours ===
- Poland: Commander with Star of the Order of Merit of the Republic of Poland (1994)
- Austria: Grand Decoration for Services to the Republic of Austria in Gold with Star (1994)
- Yugoslavia: Order of the Yugoslav Flag with Sash (9 January 1984)
- Estonia: Order of the Cross of Terra Mariana, First Class (2003)
- Croatia: Grand Cross of the Grand Order of King Tomislav
- Georgia: Order of the Golden Fleece (2001)
- Philippines: Grand Cross of the Ancient Order of Sikatuna (11 April 2001)
- Lithuania: Grand Cross of the Order of the Lithuanian Grand Duke Gediminas (4 April 1994)
- Moldova: Order of the Republic (14 May 1999)
- Russia:
  - Order of Friendship (14 July 1994)
  - Order of Honour (25 June 2001)
- Slovakia: Order of the White Double Cross, 1st Class (2000)
- Thailand: Order of the Direkgunabhorn First class (7 March 2000)
- Ukraine: Order of Prince Yaroslav the Wise Third class (21 May 2005)
- Uruguay: Medal of the Oriental Republic of Uruguay (2000)
- Italy:
  - Grand Officer of the Order of Merit of the Italian Republic (2 June 1971)
  - Grand Cross of the Order of Merit of the Italian Republic (Italy, 27 January 1981)
- Honorary Member of the Club de Santander Palomar

=== Academic awards ===
- Doctor Honoris Causa by the University of Alicante (1992), University of Granada (1997), Universidad Camilo José Cela (2002), University of Huelva (2003), Zhejiang University (2006) and Universidad Europea de Madrid (2009)

=== Awards and other recognition ===
- ?: Member of the Académie Française des Sports
- 1982: Cup Stadium for the promotion of Spanish sport
- 1988: Prince of Asturias Award for Sports
- 1988: South Korean Peace Prize
- 1986: Named president of La Caixa banking foundation, having been a member advisor since 1984
- 2010: Excellence Guirlande d'Honneur, awarded by the FICTS
- 2016: Inducted into the FIBA Hall of Fame
- 2023: Posthumously awarded the Premio In Memoriam in the inaugural Premios Vanguardia, presented at the National Museum of Art of Catalonia in Barcelona in 2023 by the King Felipe of Spain

=== Arms ===
Coat of arms of Juan Antonio Samaranch
Coronet Coronet of a Marquess. Orders Order of Isabella the Catholic collar

== See also ==
- Juan Antonio Samaranch Olympic Hall
- Joan Antoni Samaranch Olympic and Sports Museum

== Notes ==
Awards
Preceded by (United Kingdom) Sebastian Coe	Prince of Asturias Award for Sports; 1988	Succeeded by (Spain) Seve Ballesteros
Civic offices
Preceded by (Republic of Ireland) Lord Killanin	President of the International Olympic Committee; 1980–2001	Succeeded by (Belgium) Jacques Rogge
Spanish nobility
New title	Marquess of Samaranch; 1991–2010	Succeeded by Maria Teresa Samaranch
