= Lake Placid Winter Olympic Museum =

Sports museum in New York, US

Coordinates: 44.2840759°N 73.9847016°W

Lake Placid Olympic Museum
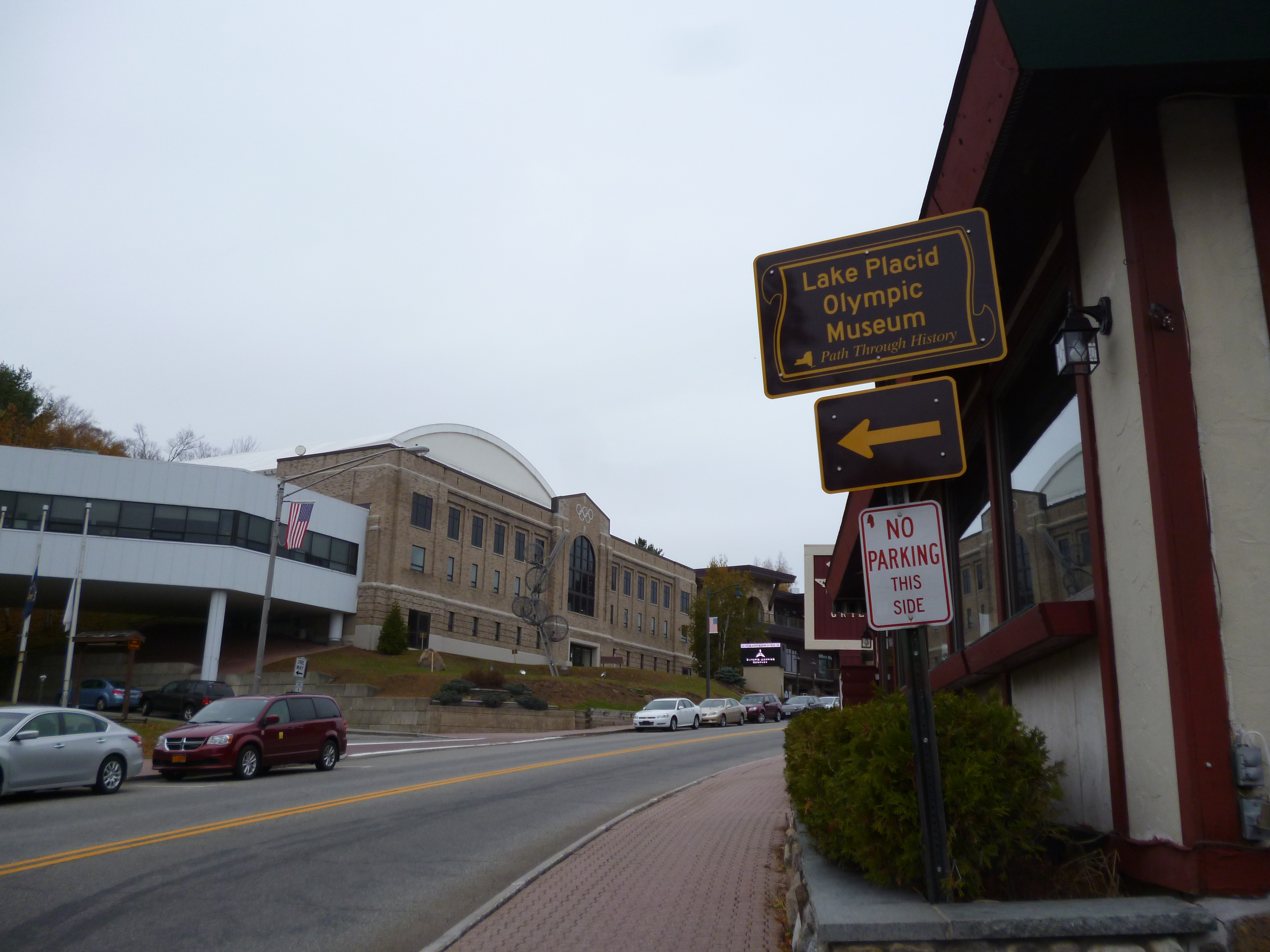
- Established: 1994
- Location: Lake Placid, New York, United States
- Visitors: 25,000-35,000 annually
- Website: Lake Placid Olympic Museum

The Lake Placid Olympic Museum commemorates the 1932 Winter Olympics and 1980 Winter Olympics, which were based in the Olympic village of Lake Placid. It is one of few Olympic museums in the United States and is a part of the work of New York State Olympic Regional Development Authority in the Lake Placid Olympic Region. Until Salt Lake City hosts the 2034 Games, Lake Placid is the only North American city to have hosted two separate Winter Olympics.

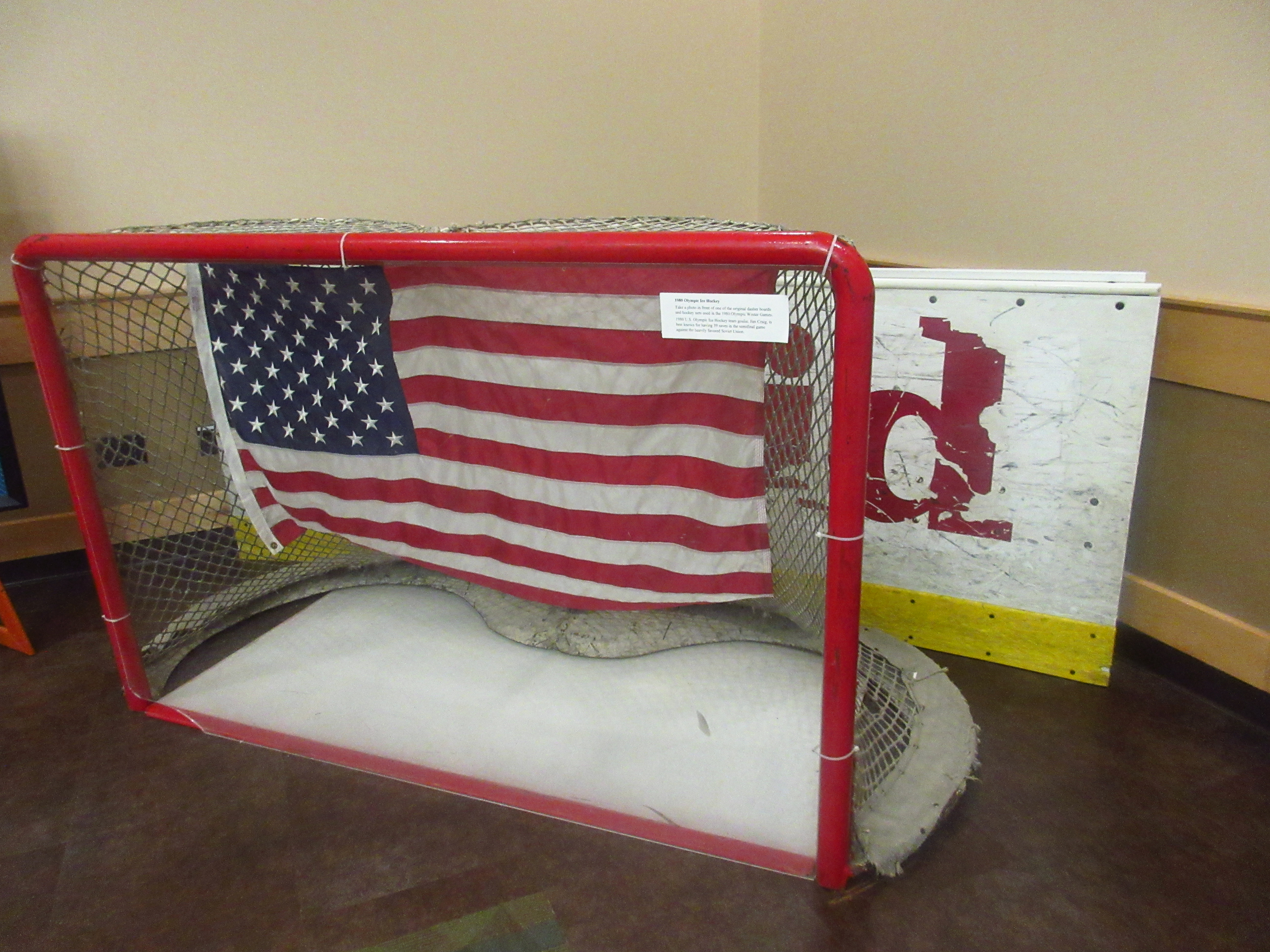
Goal occupied by Jim Craig during the Miracle on Ice during the 1980 Winter Olympics.

The museum, which was opened by New York State in 1994, is located within the Olympic Center. Its collection includes the "Fram III" bobsled from the 1932 Olympic Games which had been missing for more than sixty years prior to being donated to the museum, the skates used by Jack Shea in the same games, as well as memorabilia from the 1980 Miracle on Ice hockey team. The museum also hosted the Olympic torch when it traveled the United States prior to the 2002 Olympic Games in Salt Lake City. In addition to hosting the Lake Placid film forum, the museum's collection also provided materials for the 2004 movie Miracle, which focused on the 1980 hockey team.

The museum was the recipient of the 2005 Olympic Cup, one of the oldest awards given by the International Olympic Committee, which recognizes institutions that have been active in the service of sport, and have contributed to the development of the Olympic Movement. It has benefited from and is augmented by the other Olympic institutions and programs located in and around Lake Placid which form part of former Governor Pataki's promotion of Lake Placid as a tourism destination. The museum draws between 25,000 and 35,000 visitors each year.

== See also ==
- United States Olympic & Paralympic Museum
