= Seoul Olympic Museum =

History museum in Seoul, South Korea

Coordinates: 37°31′15″N 127°06′58″E

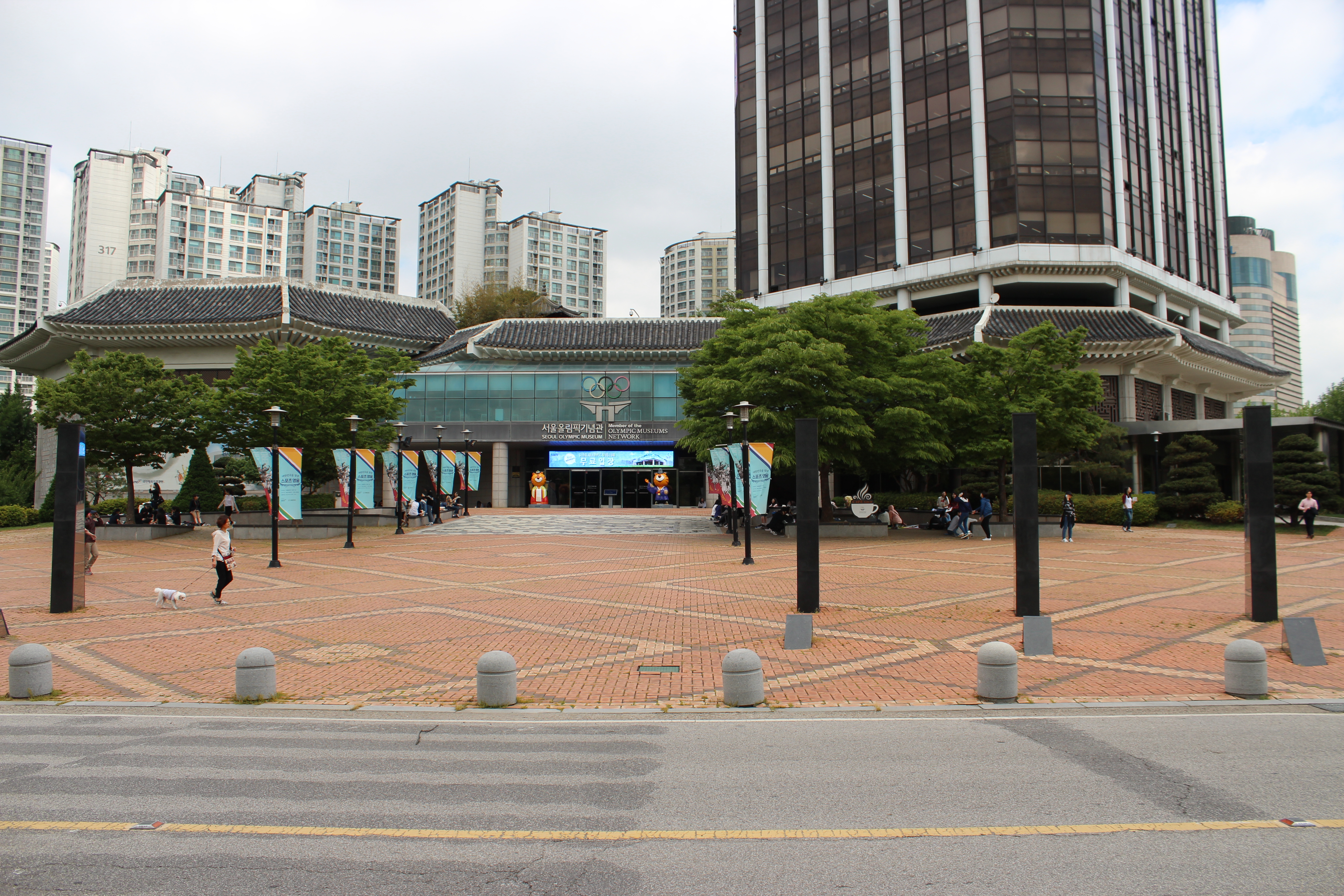
Seoul Olympic Museum

The Seoul Olympic Museum is a museum dedicated to the 1988 Summer Olympics in Seoul, South Korea. The museum was closed due to renovation from July 2018. The reopening date has been moved back several times. It was announced in February 2023 that it would be closed until 2026.

== See also ==
- List of museums in South Korea
- Olympic Park, Seoul
