= Norwegian Olympic Museum =

Sports museum in Lillehammer, Norway

Coordinates: 61°07′26″N 10°28′27″E

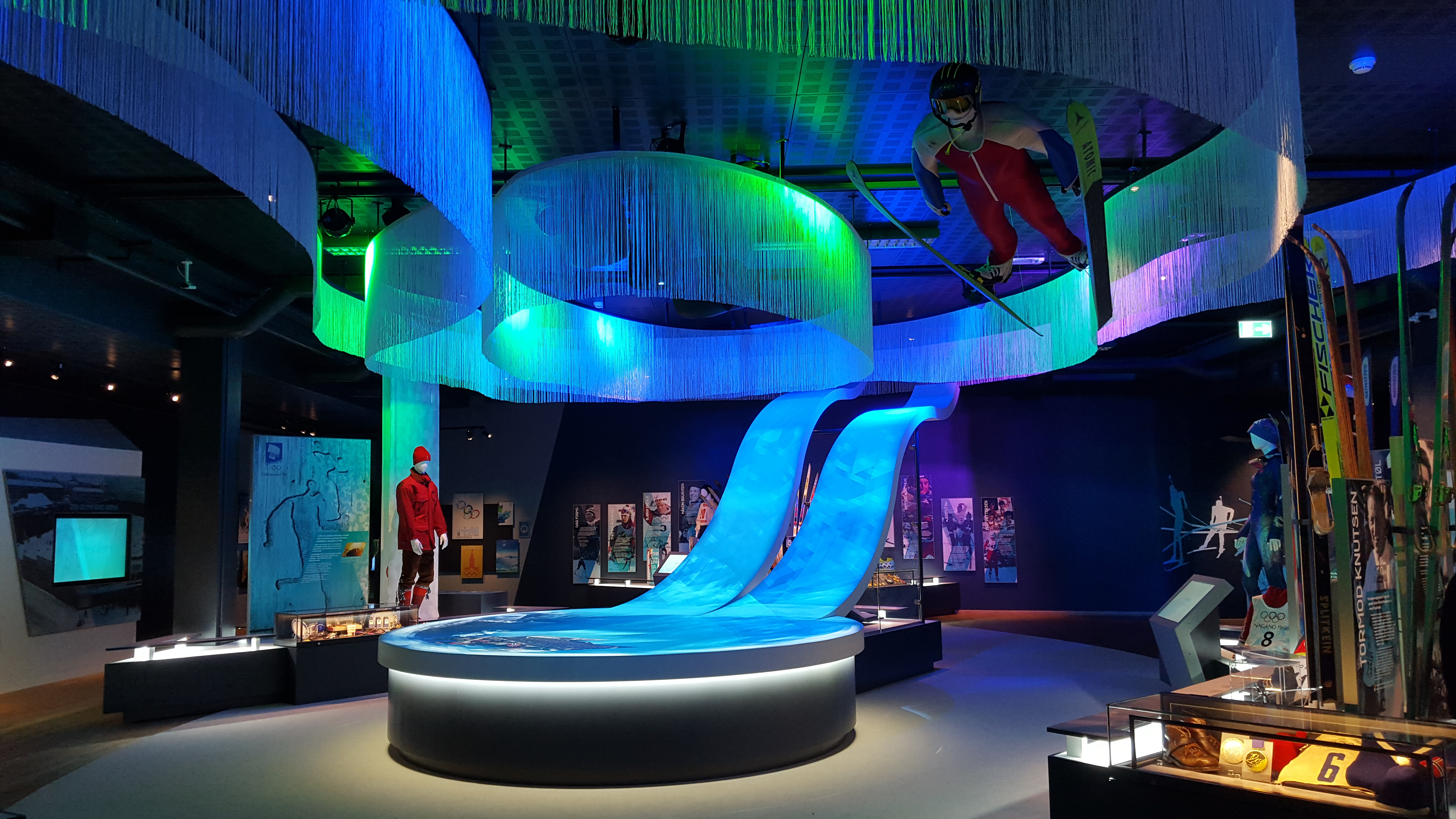
Inside of Norwegian Olympic Museum at Maihaugen, Lillehammer. Photo: Sarah Clarke / Mather & Co.

Norwegian Olympic Museum (Norges Olympiske Museum) is located at Maihaugen in Lillehammer, Norway.

The Norwegian Olympic Museum shows the history of the Olympic Games in ancient and modern times, with a focus on the 1952 Winter Olympics in Oslo and 1994 Winter Olympics at Lillehammer. Olympic highlights are presented through interactive installations, multimedia presentations and stories related to authentic objects. In addition to the permanent exhibition, the museum also displays temporary exhibitions with a theme related to sports history and athletic achievements. Paralympics and the Youth Olympics have their own sections in the museum.

The Norwegian Olympic Museum was officially opened by King Harald V and Queen Sonja on November 27, 1997, in Håkons Hall. The museum was reopened as a new modern museum at Maihaugen in 2016. The museum has interactive installations, multimedia presentations and original objects. It is the only museum in northern Europe that presents the entire history of the Olympic Games. The museum has a collection of more than 7,000 Olympic items.

“The stories in the museum can be important for young persons because they can inspire them to stay in sports”, said Bjørn Dæhlie, who has won eight gold medals and four silver medals for Norway in three Olympic Games.
