= Razorback Stadium =

Architectural structure

CommunityAmerica Razorback Stadium
- Razorback Stadium
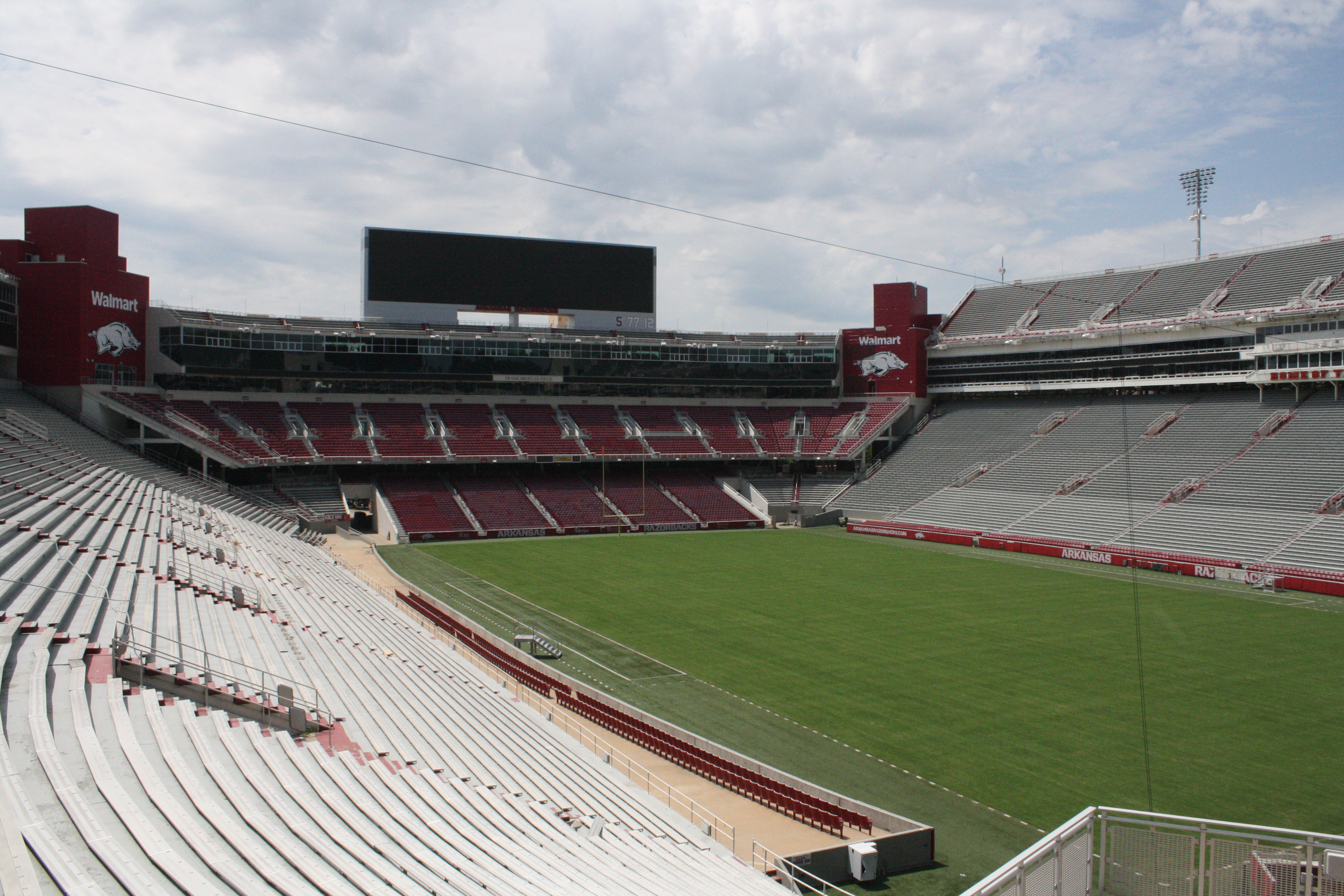

- Location in Arkansas Location in the United States
- Former names: University Stadium (1938); Bailey Stadium (1938–1941); Razorback Stadium (1941–2001)
- Location: 350 North Razorback Road, Fayetteville, AR 72701
- Coordinates: 36°4′5″N 94°10′44″W
- Owner: University of Arkansas
- Operator: University of Arkansas
- Capacity: 76,212 (2018–Present) Former capacity List: 72,000 (2001–2017); 50,019 (1995–2000); 52,680 (1985–1994); 42,678 (1969–1984); 38,000 (1965–1967); 30,000 (1957–1964); 21,200 (1950–1956); 18,500 (1947–1949); 13,500 (1938–1946)
- Executive suites: 132
- Surface: Natural Grass (1938-68, 1995-2008, 2019-present); AstroTurf (1969-94); FieldTurf (2008-18)
- Record attendance: Overall: 82,000+ (The Garth Brooks Stadium Tour); Football: 76,808 (September 25, 2010) vs Alabama
- Field size: 360 by 160 feet (110 m × 49 m)

Construction
- Groundbreaking: 1937
- Opened: September 24, 1938
- Renovated: 2001, 2017-2018
- Expanded: 1947, 1950, 1957, 1965, 1969, 1985, 2001, 2017-2018
- Cost: $492,000 ($11.3 million in 2025 dollars) $106 million (renovation)
- Architects: Thompson, Sanders, and Ginocchio Architects; Heery International (renovation)

Tenants
- Arkansas Razorbacks football (NCAA) (1938–present)

Website
- arkansasrazorbacks.com/dwrss

Razorback Stadium (currently known as CommunityAmerica Razorback Stadium for sponsorship reasons) is an American football stadium in Fayetteville, Arkansas and serves as the home field of the University of Arkansas Razorbacks football team since its opening in 1938. The stadium was formerly known as Razorback Stadium since 1941 before the name of Donald W. Reynolds, an American businessman and philanthropist, was added in 2001. The playing field in the stadium is named Frank Broyles Field, honoring former Arkansas head football coach and athletic director Frank Broyles.

During the 2000-2001 renovations, Razorback Stadium increased the seating capacity from 50,019 to 72,000, with an option to expand capacity to 76,000 with the "temporary" bleacher seating atop the south end. The current seating capacity is 76,212.

== History ==
Before 1938, the Razorbacks played in a 300-seat stadium built in 1901 on land on top of "The Hill", which is now occupied by Mullins Library and the Fine Arts Center (in the "center" of campus). The new stadium cost approximately $492,000 and was funded by the Works Progress Administration, with the University of Arkansas only paying 22% of the contract. The stadium opened for the 1938 football season as University Stadium, holding a capacity of 13,500 spectators. In the home opener for the Razorbacks, the Razorbacks defeated Oklahoma A&M by a score of 27–7 on September 24, 1938. The following week, Arkansas dedicated the stadium to then sitting Arkansas Governor Carl E. Bailey on October 3, 1938, changing the name of the stadium to Bailey Stadium. Following Governor Bailey's defeat in the 1940 gubernatorial election to Homer Martin Adkins, the stadium's name was changed in 1941 to Razorback Stadium.

=== Renovation ===
Athletic director Frank Broyles began searching for architects for the proposed $65 million stadium expansion and renovation in 1998, believing that the renovation was needed in order for the Razorbacks to compete in the Southeastern Conference at a consistent level. Broyles hoped for a completion date of 2000 or 2001 and narrowed the search down to three architecture firms: Eisenman Architects of New York, Heery International of Atlanta and Rosser International of Atlanta. Broyles awarded the renovation contract to Heery International with local support from the Wittenberg, Delony & Davidson architecture firm of Fayetteville.

The renovation was partly funded by the Donald W. Reynolds Foundation, when the foundation donated $21 million in 1999 to help renovate the stadium. What was then the largest LED display in a sports venue, the 30-by-107-foot (9 by 33 m) screen produced by SmartVision was installed along with a new scoreboard at the northern end zone in 2000. The expansion was completed before the beginning of the 2001 football season, increasing the permanent seating capacity to 72,000 from its previous capacity of 51,000 seats. 4,000 bleacher seats were added in the south end zone upper deck bringing capacity to just over 76,000 with the new expansion. In honor of the Reynolds Foundation's generosity, the stadium was formally renamed Donald W. Reynolds Razorback Stadium on September 8, 2001, where Arkansas lost to Tennessee by a score of 13–3.

On November 3, 2007, the date of the last Fayetteville home game of the 2007 football season, the playing field was dedicated and named in honor of outgoing athletic director Broyles.

A major renovation to the stadium was proposed in 2011 by Athletic Director Jeff Long, unveiling the plans to enclose the north end zone. The proposed renovation is estimated at $78 million to $95 million, which would feature at least 5,000 new seats, including field-level suites and indoor and outdoor club areas.

A new upgrade to the stadium for the 2012 season increased the size to 38 by 167 feet (12 by 51 m), from the previous LED screen size of 30 by 107 feet (9 by 33 m). The upgrade was contracted through LSI Industries.

During the 2016–17 offseason, the Broyles Athletic Center was demolished as part of a $160 million renovation and expansion of the stadium by CDI Contractors and AECOM Hunt. The expansion added 4,800 seats and new premium seating to the north end zone. This expansion boosted the capacity of the stadium from 76,000 (with south end zone top bleachers) to 80,800. However, since bleachers are no longer being used on the roof of the south end zone, official capacity beginning with the 2018 season, as relayed to the university's board of trustees prior to its vote to approve the expansion project, was 76,212. The increase in capacity is fewer than 4,800 seats because some club seating on the east side was eliminated to add additional suites.

On August 5, 2019, the University of Arkansas installed natural grass onto the playing surface, replacing the turf installed under Coach Bobby Petrino in 2009.

On June 24, 2026 the University of Arkansas announced a multi-year partnership with CommunityAmerica Credit Union, which includes the renaming of Razorback Stadium to CommunityAmerica Razorback Stadium.

== Controversy ==
Since 1948, home games were divided between two venues: Razorback Stadium and War Memorial Stadium in Little Rock. Because of the stadium renovations in 1999-2000, Razorbacks athletic director Frank Broyles wanted to move all home games to Razorback Stadium to help pay off the $30 million bond. Broyles pointed out that the expanded Razorback Stadium would increase revenue to $3 million per game, compared to the $2 million per game for playing at War Memorial Stadium.

However, Little Rock investors did not like the idea of moving all home games to Fayetteville and countered with an offer to renovate and expand War Memorial Stadium to increase revenue. Also, Little Rock investor Warren Stephens threatened to discontinue his family's support ($150,000 in annual donations with an additional $1 million in annual support from his family's company Stephens Inc.) for the program if games were pulled from Little Rock.

After listening to both Chuck Neinas (Broyles' consultant on the issue) and Stephens in January 2000, the University of Arkansas Board of Trustees voted 9-1 to sign a compromised contract with the owners of War Memorial Stadium. The contract would keep at least two Razorbacks games, including one conference game, in Little Rock until the end of the 2014 season. In 2008, the contract with War Memorial Stadium was extended through the 2016 football season by athletic director Jeff Long.

In 2014, a five-year contract called for one game to be played at War Memorial Stadium each season through 2018. In 2014 and 2018, the game was against a conference opponent. In 2015, 2016, and 2017, the game was against a nonconference team. 2018 marked the 70th anniversary of the Razorbacks playing in War Memorial Stadium.

In 2018, another agreement was signed to play games in War Memorial Stadium through 2024. The new contract specified that each home game versus the University of Missouri would be played at War Memorial through the 2023 season, and the Razorbacks would play their annual spring game in alternating seasons in Little Rock through 2024. However, the request was later denied by the SEC.

The university amended its contract with the state in February 2021 to move the Missouri games back to Fayetteville. According to the 2021 plan, the Razorbacks would face FCS opponents at War Memorial Stadium in 2021, 2023, and 2024, followed by their first-ever matchup against Arkansas State in 2025.

== Other uses ==
The 2016 movie Greater is partially filmed in Razorback Stadium.

The Garth Brooks Stadium Tour included Razorback Stadium.

== Gallery ==
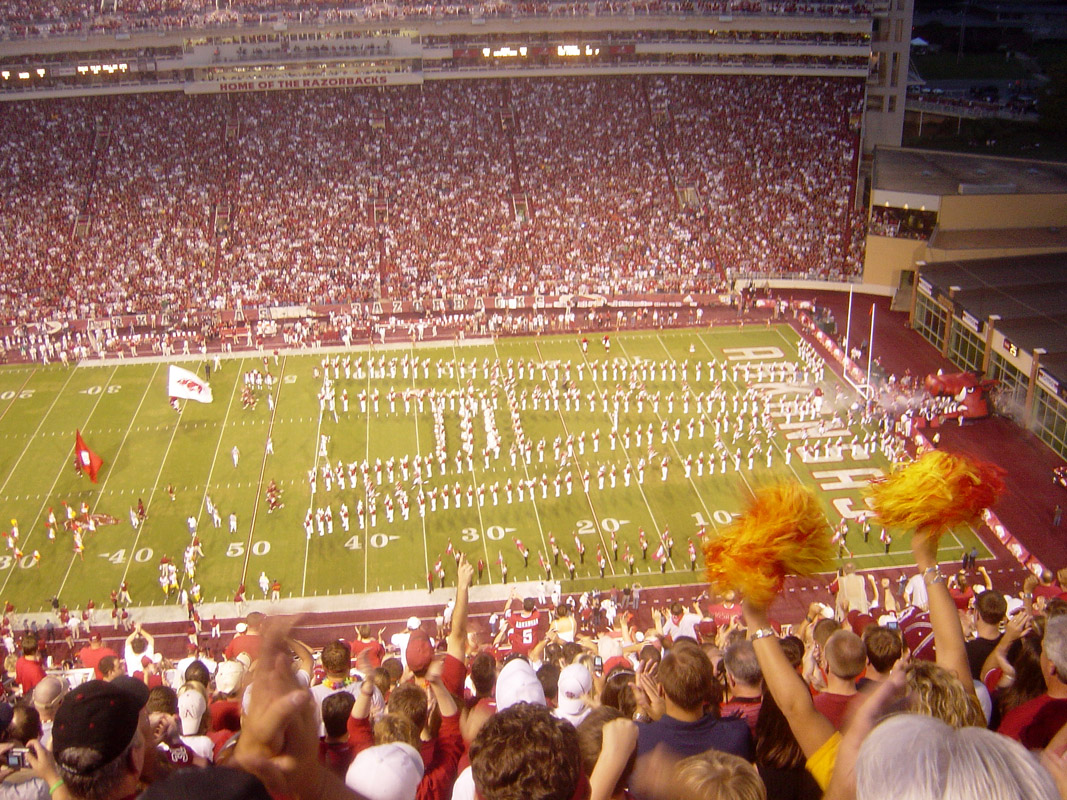
The Razorback football team takes the field

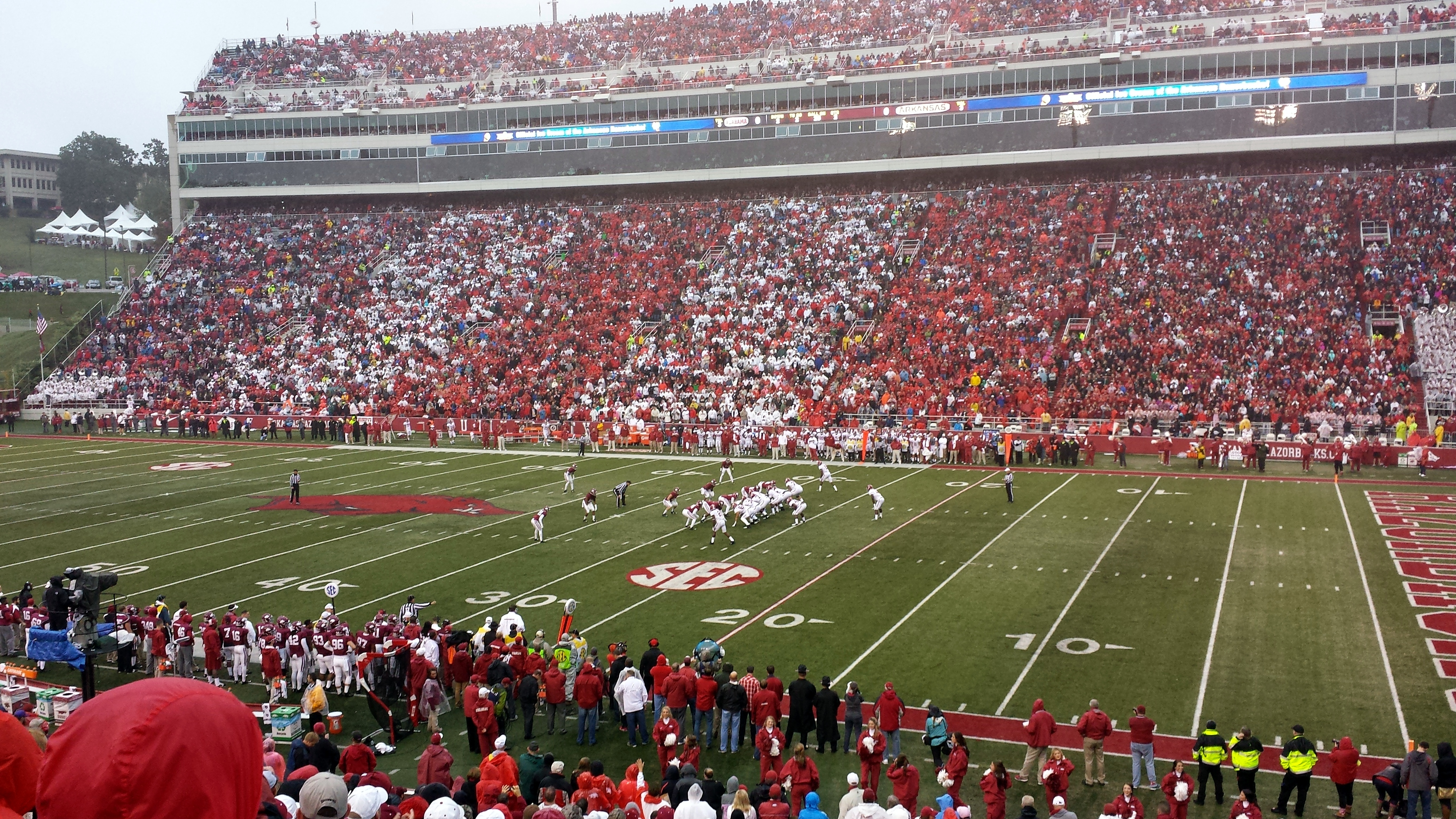
Arkansas v Alabama game in 2014

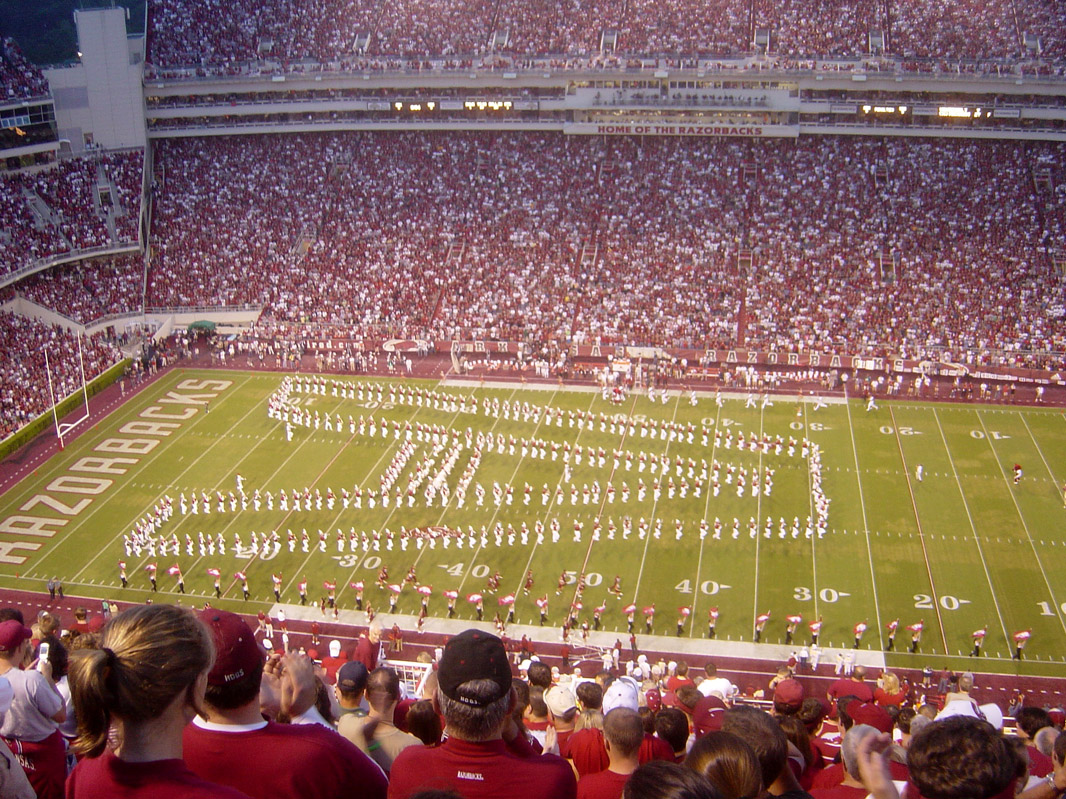
The Razorback Marching Band in formation

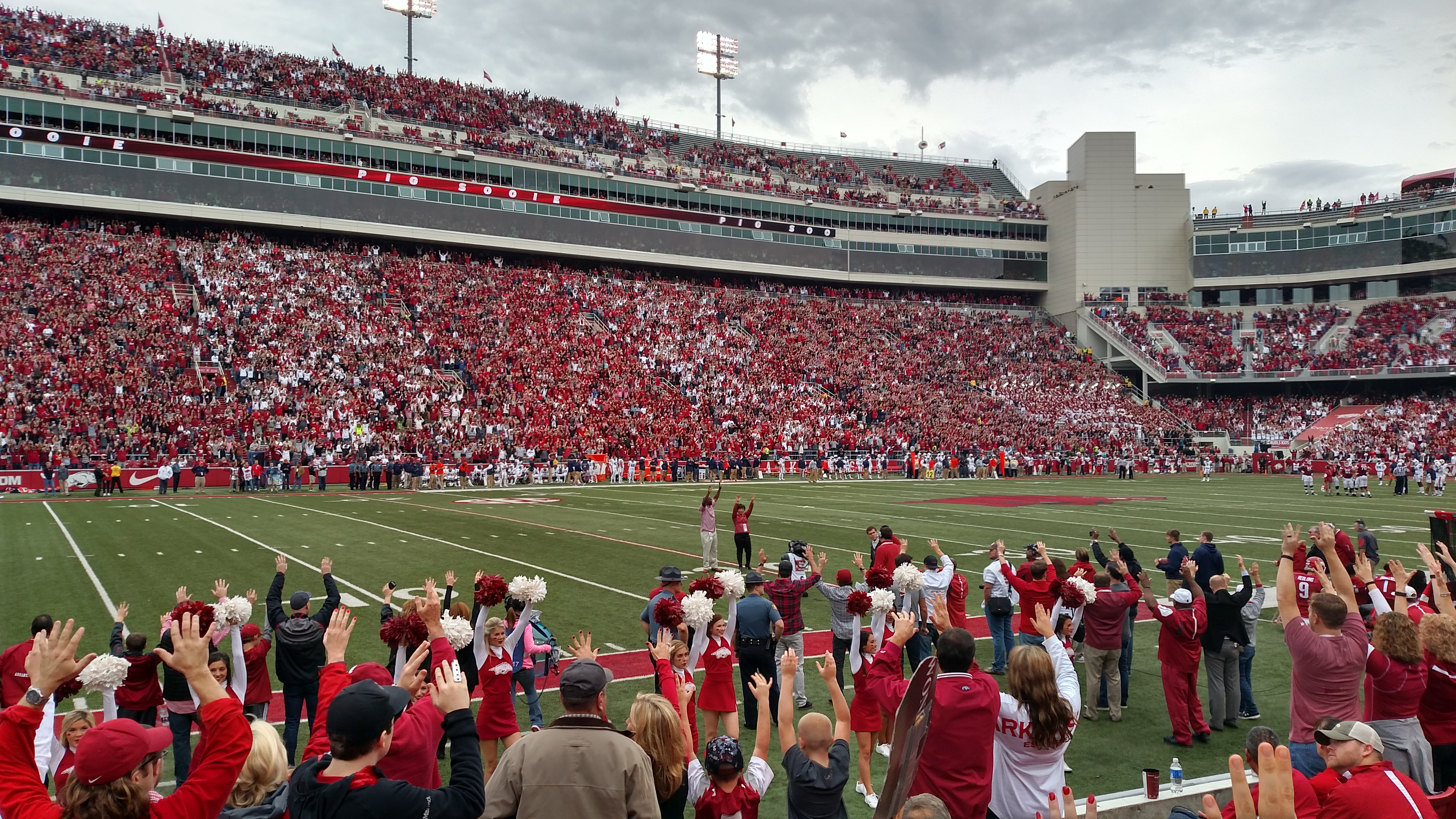
Hog call

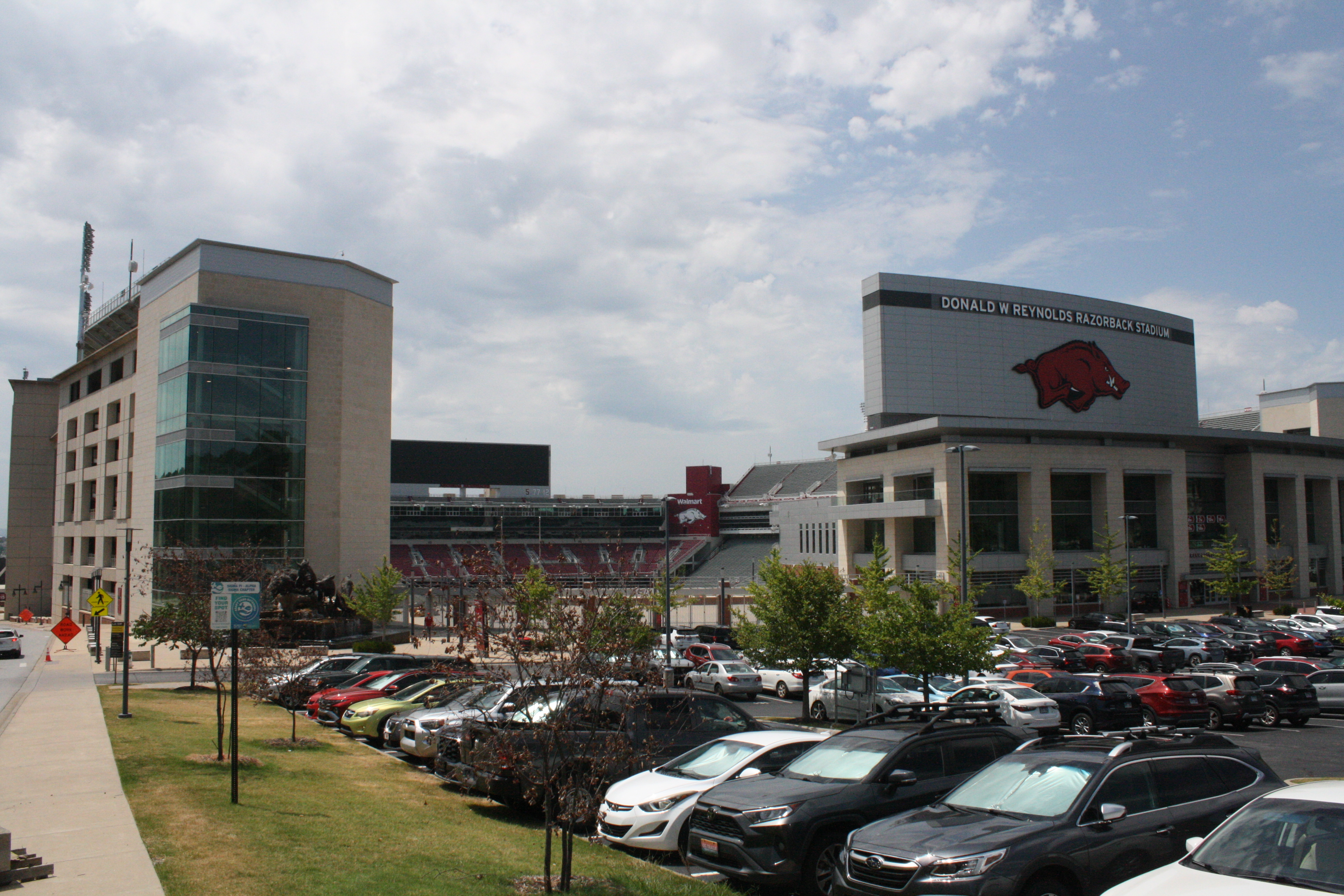
Exterior view

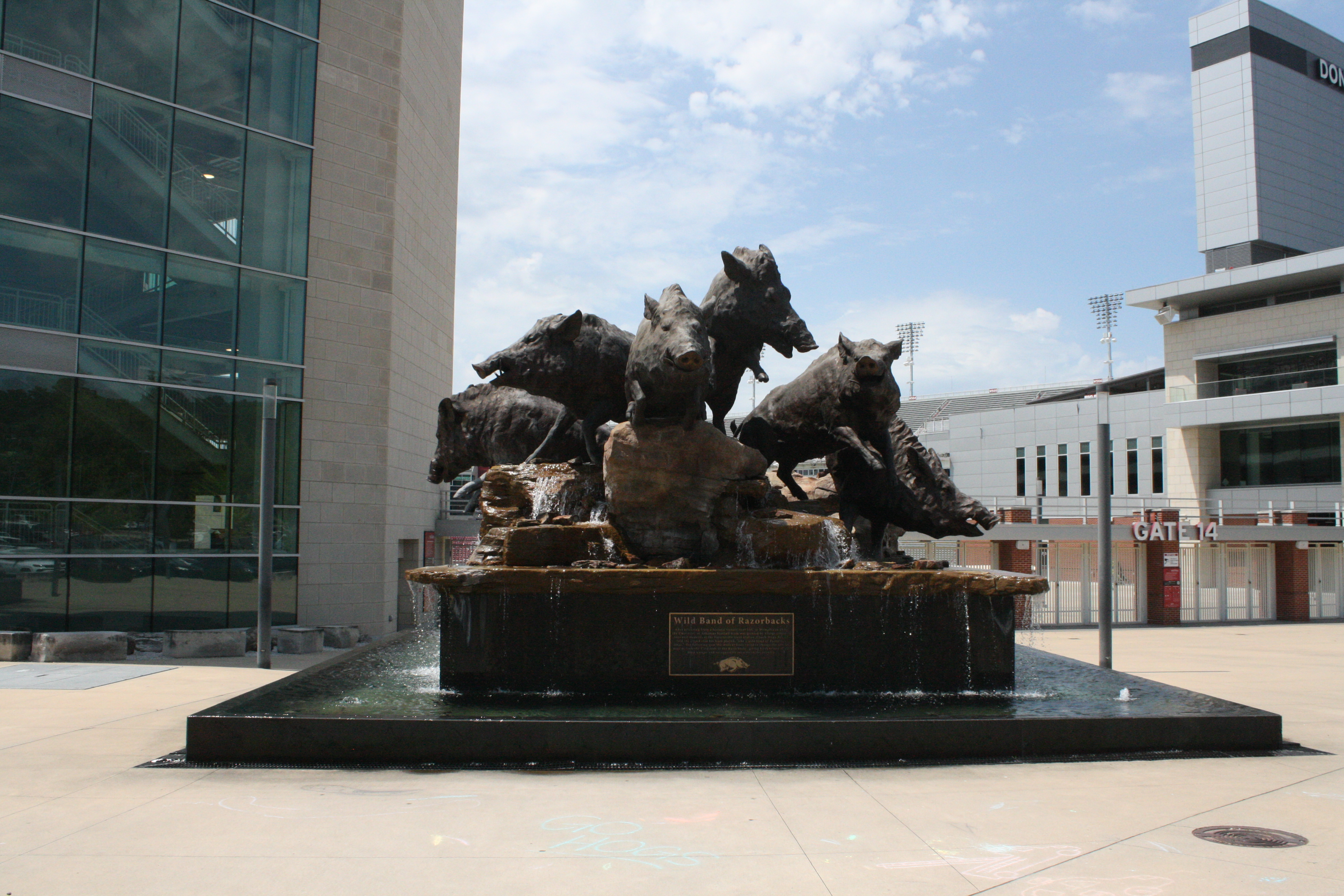
"Wild Band of Razorbacks" statue in northeast corner stadium entry

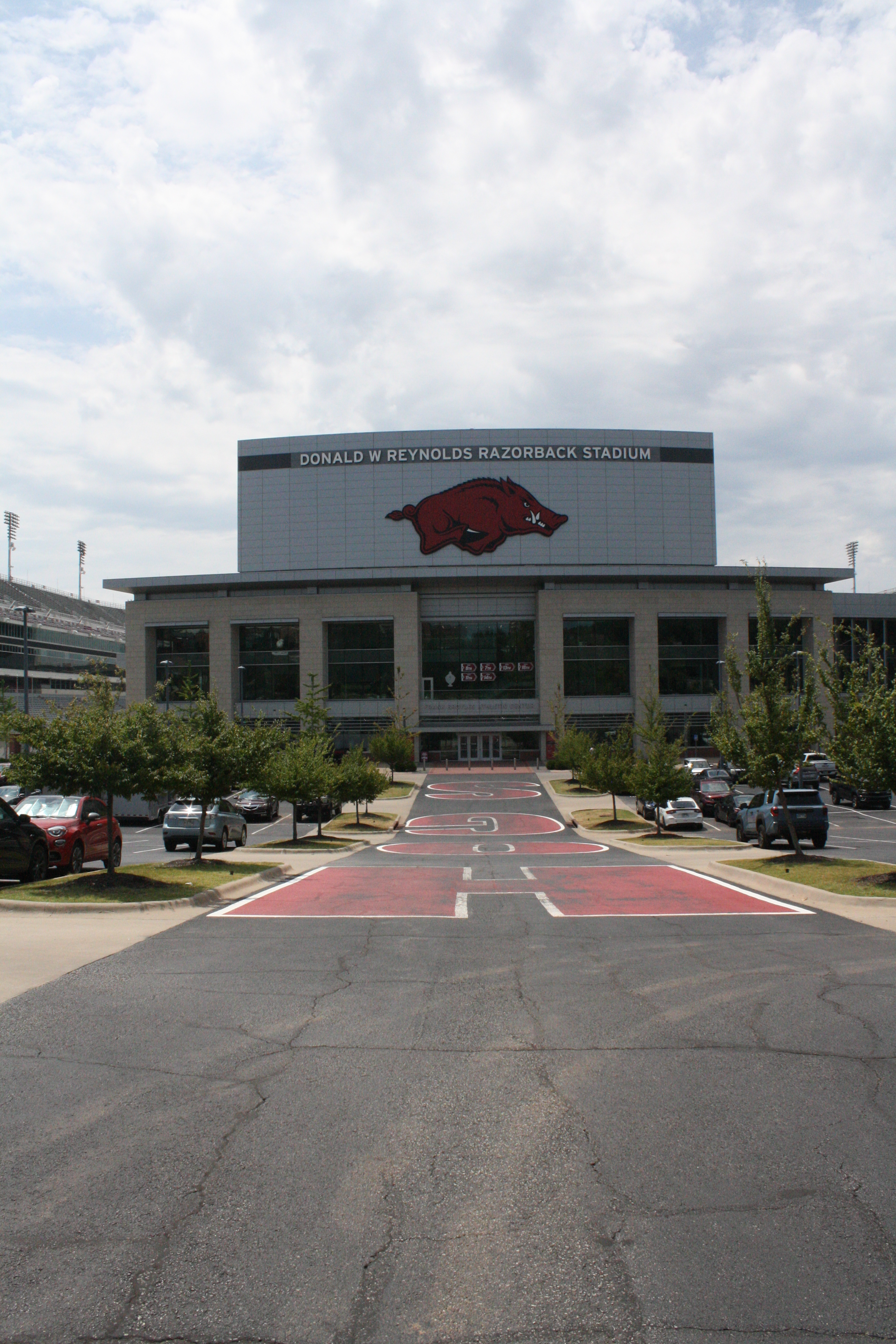
Hog Walk entry into the Broyles Center

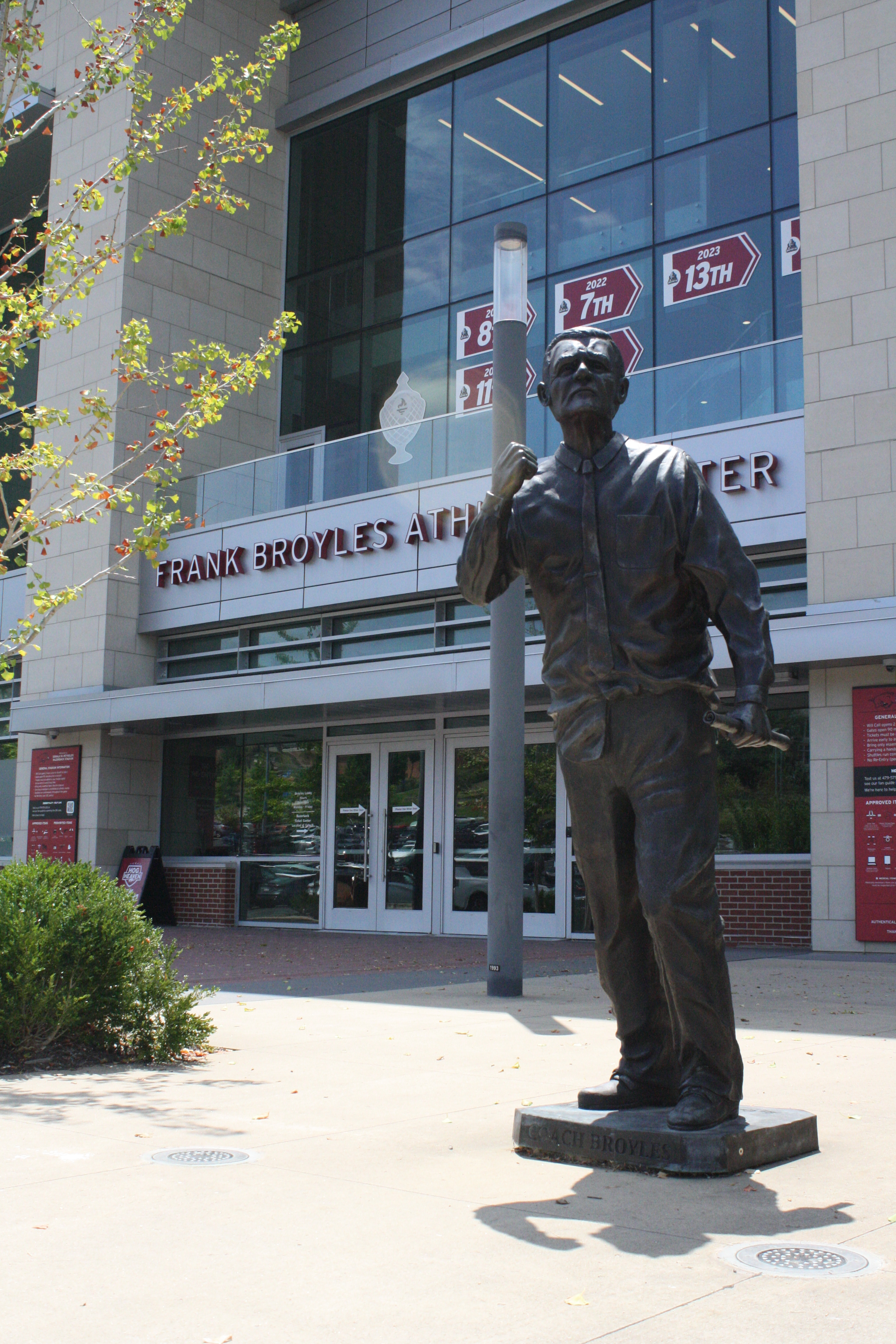
Frank Broyles statue

== See also ==
- List of NCAA Division I FBS football stadiums
- Lists of stadiums
