= USOPC Coach of the Year =

Annual sports awards in the United States

The USOPC Coach of the Year awards are given annually by the United States Olympic & Paralympic Committee to the top coaches in Olympic and Paralympic sports. One award is given in each of five categories:

- National Coach
- Developmental Coach
- Paralympic Coach
- Volunteer Coach
- Doc Councilman Science Award

Nominees for the awards are selected by the national governing bodies for Olympic, Paralympic, and Pan American Games sports and their affiliated sports organizations. Members of the media vote for the top five nominees in each category. Category winners are then selected by a special USOPC panel.

== USOPC Olympic Coach of the Year winners ==
Before 2019, the organization was known as the United States Olympic Committee. However, Paralympic sports have been under the umbrella of the organization since 1998.

- 1996 – Tara VanDerveer, U.S. Olympic Women's Basketball Coach
- 1997 – Frank Carroll, Olympic Figure Skating Coach
- 1998 – Ben Smith, U.S. Olympic Women's Ice Hockey Coach
- 1999 – Chris Carmichael, Cycling Coach
- 2000 – Richard Quick, U.S. Olympic Women's Swimming Coach
- 2001-02 – Pete del’Guidice, U.S. Snowboarding Coach
- 2003 – Lloyd Woodhouse, USA Shooting National Team Coach
- 2004 – Mike Candrea, USA Softball Women's National Team Coach
- 2005 – Eddie Reese, USA Swimming Men's National Team Coach
- 2006 – Bud Keene, U.S. Snowboarding Coach
- 2007 – Guy Baker, USA Water Polo National Team Coach
- 2008 – Hugh McCutcheon, USA Men's Volleyball National Team Coach
- 2009 – Bob Bradley, U.S. Men's Soccer Team Coach
- 2010 – Brian Shimer, U.S. Men's Bobsled Head Coach
- 2011 – Rick Bower, U.S. Snowboarding Halfpipe Coach
- 2012 – Adam Krikorian, U.S. Women's National Waterpolo Head Coach
- 2013 – Erik Flora, Alaska Pacific University Nordic Ski Club Head Coach
- 2014 – Skogen Sprang, U.S. Slopestyle Skiing Team Head Coach
- 2015 – Craig Parnham, U.S. Women's National Field Hockey Team coach
- Co-2016 – Geno Auriemma, U.S. Olympic Women’s Basketball Team coach
- Co-2016 – Aimee Boorman, U.S. Olympic Women’s Artistic Gymnastics Team
- 2017 – Bill Zadick, U.S. Freestyle World Wrestling Team Coach
- 2018 - Jason Cork, U.S. National Cross-Country Ski Team coach
- 2019 - Kisik Lee, U.S. Olympic Archery coach
- 2020 - Greg Massialas, USA Fencing
- 2021 - Karch Kiraly, USA Volleyball
- 2022 - Bobby Kersee, USA Track & Field
- 2023 – Jenni Meno-Sand, U.S. Figure Skating
- 2024 – Ralf Bissdorf, USA Fencing

== USOPC Developmental Coach of the Year winners ==
- 1996 – Jeff Shaffer, Diving - University of Southern California
- 1997 – Dianne Holum, Speedskating
- 1998 – Mike Stafford, Boxing - Millvale Golden Gloves Gym
- 1999 – Tom Healy, Northbrook (ILL.) Speedskating Club
- 2000 – Fred Zimny, USA Luge
- 2001-02 – Mike Eaves, U.S. National Under-18 Hockey Team
- 2003 – Bob Fraley, Fresno State University Track and Field
- 2004 – Dwayne Miller, Norfolk Real Deal Track Club
- 2005 – Tammy Gambill, U.S Figure Skating
- 2006 – Mark Mitchell and Peter Johansson, U.S. Figure Skating
- 2007 – Paul Yetter, USA Swimming
- 2008 – Rajul Sheth, Table Tennis
- 2009 – John Wingfield, Director and Head Coach of USA Diving National Training Center
- 2010 – Michael Nyitray, Bowling - United States Bowling Congress
- 2011 – James Hrbek, USA Judo
- 2012 – Michael Nyitray, Bowling - United States Bowling Congress
- 2013 – Kathleen Johnson, Triathlon
- 2014 – George Ryals, Archery Learning Center
- 2015 – Brett Wolf, Menomonee Judo Club
- 2016 – Kim Zmeskal-Burdette, USA Gymnastics
- 2017 - none
- 2018 - Leandro Spina, US Sailing
- 2019 - BethAnn Chamberlain, U.S. Paralympic Nordic Skiing Team
- 2020 - Dana Skelton, USA Swimming
- 2021 - Ron Aitken, USA Swimming
- 2022 - Mike Peplinski, USA Curling
- 2023 – Robert Park, USA Archery
- 2024 – Tom Anderson, U.S. Speedskating

== USOPC Paralympic Coach of the Year winners ==
- 2004 – Mike Hulett, USA Women's Sitting Volleyball Team coach
- 2005 – Randi Smith, U.S. Paralympic Archery Team Head Coach
- 2006 – Julie O'Neill, U.S. Paralympic Swim Team Head Coach
- 2007 – Adam Bleakney, U.S. Paralympic Wheelchair Track coach
- 2008 – Ken Armbruster, U.S. Paralympic Goalball Head Coach
- 2009 – Scott Moore, Denver Judo coach
- 2010 – Ray Watkins, U.S. Paralympic Alpine Ski Team
- 2011 – Dave Denniston, Paralympic Swimming Head Coach
- 2012 – Tom Franke, Paralympic Swimming Head Coach
- 2013 – Adam Bleakney, U.S. Paralympic Track & Field coach
- 2014 – Brian Loeffler, Swimming, U.S. Paralympic Swimming Team coach
- 2015 – John Devorss, Salem Tennis and Swim Club
- 2016 – Adam Bleakney, U.S. Paralympic Track & Field coach
- 2017 – Eileen Carey, Paralympic Nordic skiing coach
- 2018 – Gary Colliander, Paralympic Nordic Skiing coach
- 2019 – Wesley Johnson, U.S. Paratriathlon coach
- 2020 – Michel Assouline, U.S. Para Equestrian Dressage Team coach
- 2021 – Nathan Manley, U.S. Paralympic Swimming
- 2022 – David Hoff, USA Hockey
- 2023 – Ellen Minzner, U.S. Rowing
- 2024 – Bill Hamiter, USA Volleyball

== USOPC Volunteer Coach of the Year winners ==
- 2003 – Carol Hardemon, Metro Dade Track Club
- 2004 – Barry Hunter, D.C. Boxing Coach
- 2005 – Cindi Hart, IndySpeed Sport Club Head Coach
- 2006 – Booker Woods, LA Jets Track and Field Head Coach
- 2007 – Sherman Nelson, USA Taekwondo coach
- 2008 – Rita Gladstone, Area Tennis League Coordinator
- 2009 – Brian McCutcheon, Taekwondo coach and Oahu Taekwondo Center Instructor
- 2010 – Dave Farmer, Aurora (Colo.) Saracens Rugby Club Coach
- 2011 – Tom Waga, Brigham Young University Rugby coach
- 2012 – Don Showalter, USA Basketball, Men's Developmental National Team coach
- 2013 – Bienvenido “Benny” Roman, USA Boxing Training Camp coach
- 2014 – Kathleen Stevenson, Oklahoma Storm Junior Olympic Archer Development Team coach
- 2015 – Carl Cepuran, Glen Ellyn Speedskating
- 2016 – Tom Miller, Adirondack Speedskating Club
- 2017 – none
- 2018 – Mary Hodge, USA Para Powerlifting
- 2019 – Daniel Greene, Madison Speedskating Club
- 2020 – Cherise Wilkins, US Speedskating
- 2021 – Mary Murphy, US Speedskating
- 2022 – Jacob Roberts, US Speedskating
- 2023 – Patrick Wentland, US Speedskating
- 2024 – Chad Jones, USA Archery

== Doc Counsilman Science Award winners ==
- 2003 – James E. "Doc" Counsilman, Swimming
- 2004 – Dr. Joe Vigil, Track and Field
- 2005 – Dr. Kyle Pierce, Weightlifting
- 2006 – Kat Arbour, Figure Skating
- 2007 – Sean O'Neill, Table Tennis
- 2008 – Dave Bennett, Wrestling
- 2009 – Heidi Thibert, Figure Skating
- 2010 – Grant Schaffner, Skeleton
- 2011 – Neal Henderson, Cycling
- 2012 – Doug Eng, Tennis
- 2013 – Gordon Uehling III, Tennis
- 2014 – Dave Hamilton, U.S. Women’s National Field Hockey Team
- 2015 – Warren Pretorius, Tennis Analytics
- 2016 – Derek Davis, USA Archery
- 2017 – none
- 2018 – Ingmar Jungnickel, US Speedskating
- 2019 – Andrew Stuart, US Speedskating
- 2020 – Jeff Lackie, U.S. Ski & Snowboard
- 2021 – Randy Wilbur, USA Track & Field
- 2022 – Tom West, USRowing
- 2023 – Garrett Lucash, U.S. Figure Skating
- 2024 – Steffany Hanlen, U.S. Figure Skating

== See also ==
- United States Olympic Hall of Fame
