= Rachel Mayer =

American ice dancer

Personal information
- Other names: Godino
- Born: December 12, 1973 (age 52) Minneapolis, Minnesota

Figure skating career
- Country: United States
- Skating club: Skating Club of Boston

Rachel Lynn Mayer (married name: Godino) (born December 12, 1973) is an American former ice dancer. With partner Peter Breen, she represented the United States at the 1992 Winter Olympics where they placed 15th.

== Personal life ==
Mayer was born December 12, 1973, in Minneapolis, Minnesota. In 1991, she graduated from The Rivers School in Weston, Massachusetts. She married Tom Godino Jr., with whom she has three children – Kylie, Thomas, and Annie. She lives in Palm Beach Gardens, Florida.

== Career ==
Mayer and Breen won the silver medal at the 1992 U.S. Championships. They competed at the 1992 Winter Olympics in Albertville, France, finishing 15th. Their original dance was to the music of Saak-I-Jaarven and their free dance was to the soundtrack of Doctor Zhivago.

In 2001, Mayer was elected chair of the United States Olympic Committee's Athletes' Advisory Council (AAC) for 2001–2004 and served on the USOC Board of Directors and the USOC Executive Committee. She also served on the Salt Lake Organizing Committee Board of Trustees, which helped plan the 2002 Winter Olympics.

In 2003, the USOC was involved in controversy concerning its CEO, Lloyd Ward, and its president, Marty Mankamyer. Mayer testify in Congress before both Senate and House committees about various issues concerning the structure, governance, and operation of the USOC. The controversy led to the creation in 2003 of both a USOC Governance and Ethics Task Force and an Independent Commission on Reform of the United States Olympic Committee, the members of the latter chosen by members of Congress. As the Chair of the Athletes Advisory Council, Mayer was a leader of the effort to reform the USOC, which culminated at a USOC Board of Directors meeting in October 2003, when the USOC Board voted to change the USOC governance structure, going from a 123-member Board, 21 Executive Committee members, and 19 committees with 195 committee members to an 11-member Board with no executive committee and four (4) standing committees with 20 members (most of whom are also members of the 11-member Board).

Beginning in January 2006, Rachel Godino served as a member of the Board of Athletes for Hope, a public charity founded to, among other things, increase the involvement of Olympic and professional athletes in charitable and community causes.

== Results ==
GP: Champions Series (Grand Prix)

with Breen

International
Event	87–88	88–89	89–90	90–91	91–92	92–93	93–94
Winter Olympics					15th		
World Championships					15th		
International de Paris						8th	
Skate America					6th		8th
Skate Canada				7th			
Nebelhorn Trophy							2nd
International: Junior
World Junior Champ.	9th						
National
U.S. Championships		1st J		6th	2nd	5th	
J = Junior level
