= Peter Ueberroth =

American sports executive (born 1937)

Peter Ueberroth Olympic Order
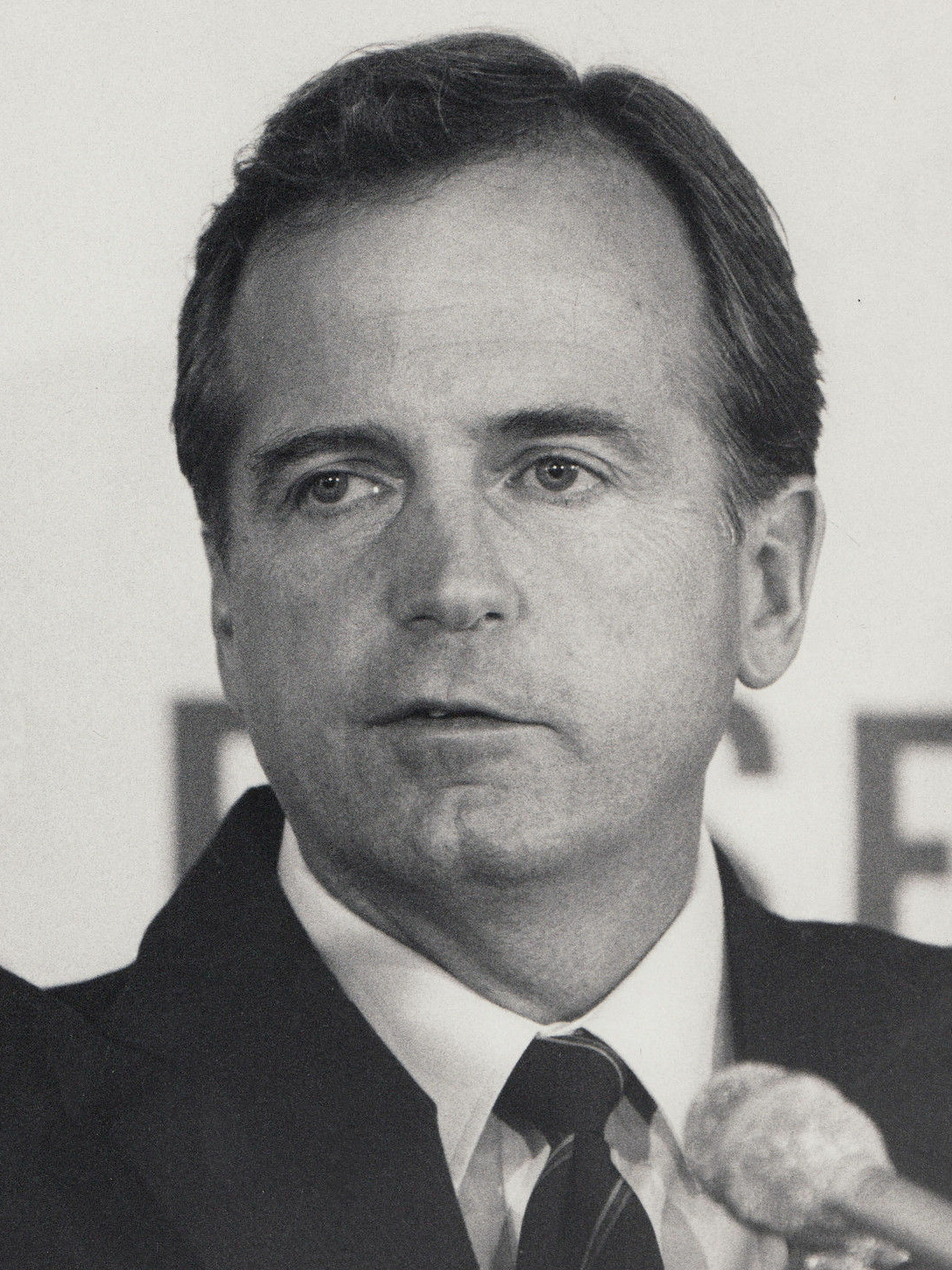
- Ueberroth in 1985

President of the United States Olympic Committee
- In office 2004–2008
- Preceded by: Marty Mankamyer; William C. Martin (Interim)
- Succeeded by: Larry Probst

6th Commissioner of Baseball
- In office October 1, 1984 – April 1, 1989
- Preceded by: Bowie Kuhn
- Succeeded by: Bart Giamatti

President of the Organising Committee for the Olympic Games
- In office August 3, 1980 – August 12, 1984
- IOC President: Juan Antonio Samaranch
- Preceded by: Ignati Novikov (Official Representative)
- Succeeded by: Roh Tae-woo

Chair of the Los Angeles Olympic Organizing Committee
- In office March 26, 1979 – September 27, 1984
- Preceded by: Committee established
- Succeeded by: Position dissolved

Personal details
- Born: Peter Victor Ueberroth; September 2, 1937 (age 89) Evanston, Illinois, U.S.
- Education: San Jose State University

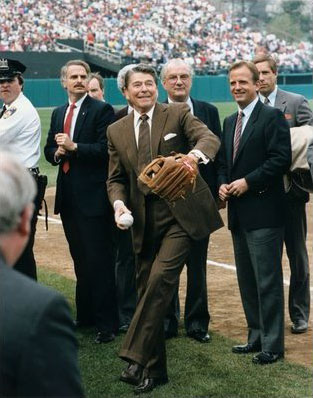
Ueberroth (front right) watches President Ronald Reagan throw the first pitch prior to a game at Memorial Stadium in Baltimore.

Peter Victor Ueberroth (/ˈjuːbərɒθ/; born September 2, 1937) is an American sports and business executive known for his involvement in the Olympics and in Major League Baseball. A Los Angeles–based businessman, he was the chairman of the Los Angeles Olympic Organizing Committee which brought the games to Los Angeles in 1984. Ueberroth was named 1984's Time Man of the Year for his success in organizing the Olympic Games, and was also named The Sporting News Sportsman of the Year.

After the conclusion of the games, he was named as the sixth commissioner of baseball, a role he held from 1984 to 1989. He later served as the chairman of the United States Olympic & Paralympic Committee from 2004 to 2008.

== Early life ==
Ueberroth was born in Evanston, Illinois, the son of Laura (Larson) and Victor Ueberroth. His father was of German and Austrian descent, and his mother was of Swedish and Irish ancestry. He caddied at Sunset Ridge Country Club, in Northfield, Illinois. He grew up in Northern California. While attending Fremont High School, Ueberroth excelled in football, baseball, and swimming. After graduating from high school, Ueberroth attended San Jose State University on an athletic scholarship. While attending San Jose State he joined Delta Upsilon. He competed in the 1956 United States Olympic water polo trials but failed to make the team. Ueberroth ultimately graduated from San Jose State in 1959 with a degree in business.

=== Trans International Airlines ===
After college, Ueberroth became a vice president and shareholder in Trans International Airlines (he was 22 years old at the time), then owned by future billionaire Kirk Kerkorian. Ueberroth worked at Trans International until 1963, when he founded his own travel company, which would become First Travel Corporation. By the time he sold First Travel in 1980, it was the second largest travel business in North America.

== Sports career ==
=== 1984 Summer Olympics ===
After Los Angeles was awarded the 1984 Summer Olympics in 1978, management consulting firm Korn Ferry was tasked with finding a president for the Los Angeles Olympic Organizing Committee. Ueberroth was one of over 200 people approached for the role; other prominent candidates included Curt Gowdy, Alexander Haig, Lee Iacocca, and Pete Rozelle. Ueberroth later wrote that he was initially reluctant to apply for the job, but eventually agreed to meet with LAOOC board members one-on-one. In the first of these meetings, he wrote, Justin Dart declared that he did not want to meet any other candidates. Ueberroth's primary competitor for the position was Edwin Steidle, the chairman of May Company California. When the LAOOC board put the matter to a final vote on March 26, 1979, a two-week delay was requested to allow Steidle to negotiate the terms of his exit from May. With 17 of the 22 members present, the board voted 9–8 to deny the request, effectively making Ueberroth the only candidate. Rafer Johnson, who later lit the cauldron at the opening ceremony, was reportedly the deciding vote. Ueberroth was then chosen unanimously.

Ueberroth remained in the role for the next five years, serving until after the Olympics were over. At the LAOOC's peak, Ueberroth and his second-in-command Harry Usher were responsible for managing 70,000 employees and volunteers. Ueberroth received the Olympic Order in gold from the International Olympic Committee (IOC). Due to the success of the games, he was named Time magazine's Man of the Year in 1984. Organizing the first privately financed Olympic Games in history, Ueberroth and Usher were credited with successfully keeping operational costs low while attracting over $600 million in sponsorship and broadcasting revenues. This resulted in a surplus of nearly $250 million, which was subsequently used to support youth and sports activities throughout the United States. The privately run Olympics became the model for future Games, and Ueberroth's aggressive recruiting of sponsors for the 1984 Olympics is credited as the genesis for the current Olympic sponsorship program. Due to recruiting competitors between the Los Angeles Olympic Committee and the United States Olympic Committee (USOC), after 1984 all Olympics in the US had their local organizing committees enter into recruitment agreements with the USOC to jointly recruit sponsors and share revenue. Coincidentally, he was born on the day on which the founder of the modern Olympic Games, Baron Pierre de Coubertin, died.

=== Commissioner of Baseball ===
Ueberroth was elected to succeed Bowie Kuhn on March 3, 1984, and took office on October 1 of that year. As a condition of his hiring, Ueberroth increased the commissioner's fining ability from US$5,000 to $250,000. His salary was raised to a reported $450,000, nearly twice what Kuhn was paid.

Just as Ueberroth was taking office, the Major League Umpires Union was threatening to strike the postseason. Ueberroth managed to arbitrate the disagreement and had the umpires back to work before the League Championship Series were over. The next summer, Ueberroth worked behind the scenes to limit a players' strike to one day before a new labor agreement was worked out with the Players Association.

During the course of his stint as commissioner, Ueberroth reinstated two Hall of Famers, Willie Mays and Mickey Mantle, who had been banned from working for Major League Baseball by Kuhn because of their associations with gambling casinos. Also, Ueberroth suspended numerous players because of cocaine use, negotiated a $1.8 billion television contract with CBS, and initiated the investigation against Pete Rose's betting habits. In 1985, Ueberroth's first full year in office, the League Championship Series expanded from a best-of-five series to a best-of-seven series. At his urging, the Chicago Cubs chose to install lights at Wrigley Field rather than reimburse the leagues for lost night-game revenue. Ueberroth then found a new source of income in the form of persuading large corporations to pay for the privilege of having their products endorsed by MLB.

However, Ueberroth, with the assistance of the owners, also facilitated collusion between the owners in violation of the league's collective bargaining agreement with the players. Players entering free agency in the 1985, 1986 and 1987 offseasons were, with few exceptions, prevented from both signing equitable contracts and joining the teams of their choice during this period. The roots of the collusion lay in Ueberroth's first owners' meeting as commissioner, when he called the owners "damned dumb" for being willing to lose money in order to win a World Series. Later, he told the general managers that it was "not smart" to sign long-term contracts. Former Major League Baseball Players Association president Marvin Miller later described this as "tantamount to fixing, not just games, but entire pennant races, including all post-season series." The MLBPA, under Miller's successor, Donald Fehr, filed collusion charges and won each case, resulting in "second look" free agents, and over $280 million in fines. Fay Vincent, who followed A. Bartlett Giamatti as the 8th commissioner, laid the crippling labor problems of the early 1990s (including the 1994–95 strike) directly at the feet of Ueberroth and the owners' collusion, holding that the collusion years constituted theft from the players.

Under Ueberroth, Major League Baseball enjoyed "increased attendance (record attendance four straight seasons), greater awareness of crowd control and alcohol management within ballparks, a successful and vigilant anti-drug campaign, significant industry-wide improvement in the area of fair employment, and a significantly improved financial picture for the industry. When Ueberroth took office, 21 of the 26 clubs were losing money; in Ueberroth's last full season – 1988 – all clubs either broke even or finished in the black. In 1987, for example, baseball as an industry showed a net profit of $21.3 million, its first profitable year since 1973."

Nonetheless, following the announcement of the first of three large awards to the players following the collusion findings, Ueberroth stepped down as commissioner before the start of the 1989 regular season; his contract was to have run through the end of the season. He was succeeded by National League president Bart Giamatti.

== Post-baseball activities ==
Ueberroth was a corporate director of The Coca-Cola Company from 1986 until his retirement in 2015. Ueberroth is an investor and chairman of the Contrarian Group, Inc., a business management company, and has held this position since 1989. He is also co-chairman of Pebble Beach Company. He is a director of Hilton Hotels Corp. and previously served as director of Adecco S.A. from 2004 to 2008. He has served as Chairman of the Board of Aircastle since 2012 and been on the board since 2006.

In 1989, Ueberroth considered purchasing Eastern Air Lines, then crippled by a strike and bankruptcy from Texas Air. However, a management dispute with Texas Air CEO Frank Lorenzo led to the deal falling through.

In 1990, Ueberroth bought controlling interest of Hawaiian Airlines with his brother John and business partner J. Thomas Talbot.

Three years after leaving office, he led the Rebuild Los Angeles project after the 1992 Los Angeles riots.

During the 1992 United States presidential election, independent candidate Ross Perot "liked him the best" out of a list of potential running mates. However, while Ueberroth was interested, the campaign staff felt he was too unknown in politics to be the vice-presidential nominee.

In 1999, Ueberroth, along with Arnold Palmer and Clint Eastwood, bought the Pebble Beach golf course.

Ueberroth ran for Governor of California in the 2003 California recall election as an independent, though he was a registered Republican. His campaign focused on California's economic and budget crisis, avoiding social issues. With polls indicating only a low level of support, he pulled out of the race on September 9, 2003, though his name still appeared on the ballot and received a small but significant number of votes. He placed sixth in a field of 135 candidates.

Ueberroth was chairman of Ambassadors International but was replaced by his son, Joseph Ueberroth in April 2006. Ueberroth resigned from the board in November 2008.

Ueberroth was also the chairman of the United States Olympic Committee Board of Directors from 2004 to 2008.

Ueberroth was inducted into the USA Water Polo Hall of Fame in 2010.

Ueberroth is a Life Trustee of the University of Southern California.

Ueberroth and his wife, Ginny, were two of the founders of Sage Hill School. He additionally served briefly on the school's Athletic Advisory Council.

Ueberroth is a board member for the Lott IMPACT Trophy, named after Pro Football Hall of Famer Ronnie Lott, and is awarded annually to college football's Defensive IMPACT Player of the Year.

== Personal life ==
Ueberroth married Virginia "Ginny" Nicolaus in 1959, and they have four children.

Sporting positions
Preceded by (Soviet Union) Konstantin Chernenko	President of Organizing Committee for Summer Olympic Games; 1984	Succeeded by (South Korea) Roh Tae-woo
