= Cliff Buck =

American sports administrator (1906–1988)

- Born: Clifford Howard Buck; April 22, 1901; Rushville, Illinois, U.S.
- Died: February 7, 1989 (aged 87); Carbondale, California
- Education: Iowa Wesleyan University
- Occupation: President of the United States Olympic Committee (1970–1973)
- Spouse: Isabel McFerran (m. 1923; div. 1947)
- Children: 2

Clifford Howard Buck (April 22, 1901 – February 7, 1989) was an American sports administrator who was president of the Amateur Athletic Union from 1965 to 1967 and the United States Olympic Committee from 1970 to 1973.

== Early life ==
Buck was born on April 22, 1901 in Rushville, Illinois to Nathaniel C. and Blanche (Pollock) Buck. He attended Iowa Wesleyan University, where he played basketball and football. He pursued postgraduate education at the University of Iowa and the University of Michigan. In 1923, he married Isabel McFerran. They had two children and divorced in 1945.

From 1925 to 1927, Buck was the athletic director, physical education teacher, and head football and basketball coach Salida High School in Salida, Colorado. He then worked for Wilson Sporting Goods where he was manager of their Rocky Mountain sales division from 1930 to 1940. After a six-year stint as manager of the company's Texas sales division, he returned to his previous position, where he remained until his retirement in 1963.

== Amateur Athletic Union ==
Be was elected president of the Amateur Athletic Union in 1964. He took office at a time where the AAU was fighting with the National Collegiate Athletic Association for control of amateur track. Buck attempted resolve the dispute by offering the NCAA three seats on the committee overseeing the national AAU track and field championships, which the NCAA declined. The two sides appeared before the United States Senate Committee on Commerce and agreed to end the controversy through binding arbitration. Buck was reelected in 1965 and could not run again in 1966 due to term limits.

== United States Olympic Committee ==
In 1970, Buck, backed by the AAU, sought the presidency of the United States Olympic Committee. He was opposed Robert Kane, who was supported by the NCAA, and Julian Roosevelt, who represented sporting organizations that were independent of both groups. None of the candidates received a majority after three ballots, which led to the lowest vote-getter (Kane) being dropped. On the fourth ballot, Buck defeated Roosevelt 30 votes to 19 with 6 abstentions.

A resident of Denver, Buck pushed for the city to host the 1976 Winter Olympics. Denver was selected by the International Olympic Committee, but Colorado voters rejected partially funding the games in a referendum, marking the first time a city awarded an Olympics rejected them.

Following the controversial 1972 Olympic men's basketball final, Buck recommended that the United States withdraw from Olympic basketball and submitted a 20-page appeal seeking to overturn the result of the game.

Buck did not run for reelection in 1973 and was succeeded by Philip O. Krumm.
