= Susanne Lyons =

American businesswoman (born 1957)

Susanne Daisley Lyons (born April 19, 1957) is an American businesswoman who has been chair of the United States Olympic & Paralympic Committee (USOPC) since January 2019.

Lyons was born on April 19, 1957. She earned a bachelor's degree from Vassar College and an MBA from Boston University.

Lyons worked for Fidelity Investments, Russell Reynolds Associates, Charles Schwab Corporation, and Visa Inc., having been the chief marketing officer at the latter.

She was unanimously elected chair of USOPC, effective January 1, 2019, after having been an independent member of the board since December 2010.
