= Chuck Neinas =

American sports commissioner (1932–2025)

Charles Merrill Neinas (January 18, 1932 – December 16, 2025) was an American businessperson involved in sports broadcasting and athletic administratiom. Neinas' career included leadership positions in college athletics and the United States Olympic Committee. He played a key role in the transformation of college football into a multibillion-dollar business.

Neinas was part of an effort that culminated in NCAA v. Board of Regents of the University of Oklahoma, which ended the National Collegiate Athletic Association's control over college football television contracts and allowed schools and conferences to negotiate broadcast rights directly. The decision shifted the power balance in college sports by holding that the NCAA had violated the Sherman and Clayton antitrust acts.

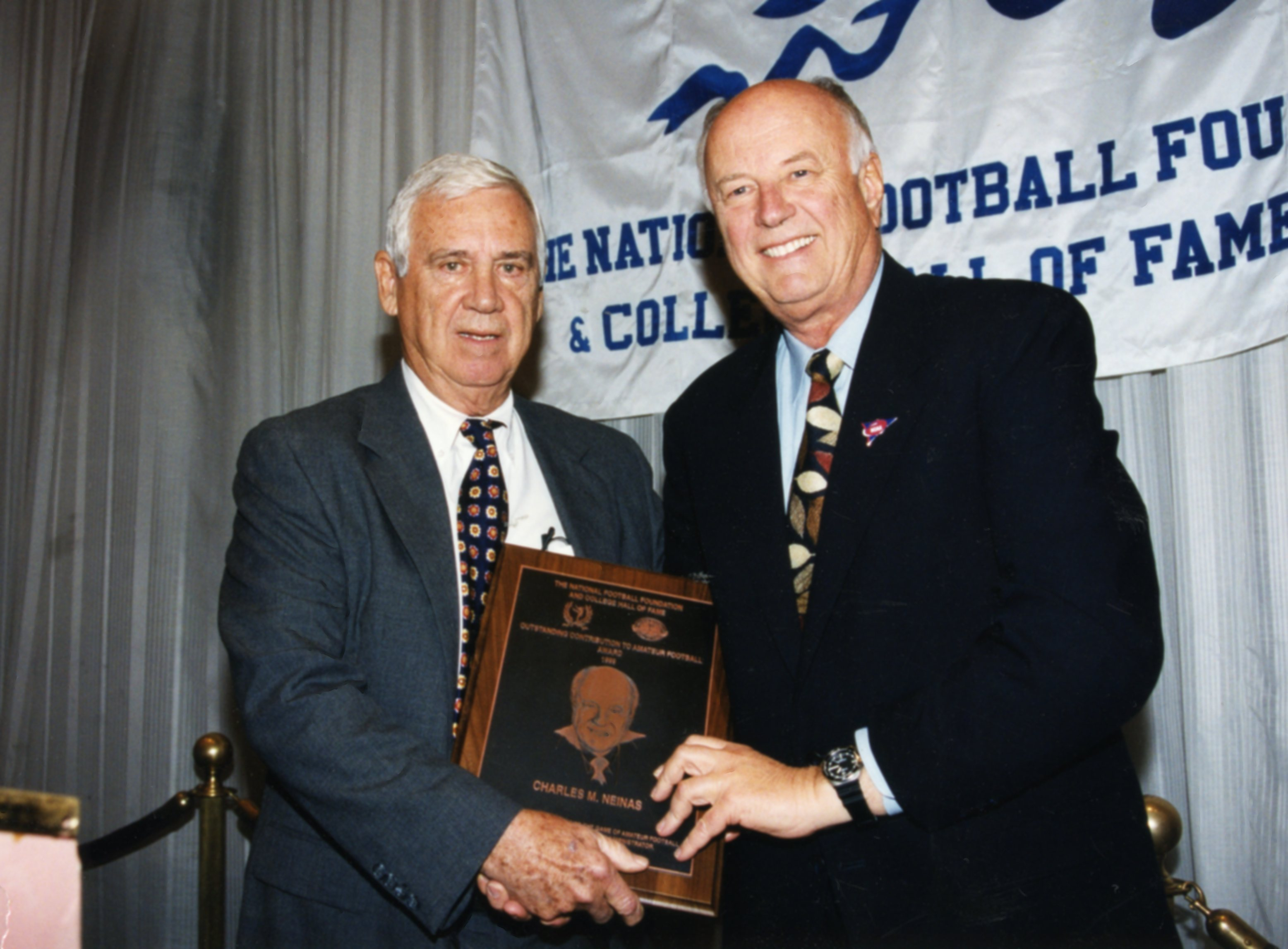
Neinas (right) accepts the NFF Outstanding Contribution to Amateur Football Award in 1999 from board member Gene Corrigan.

== Early life ==
Neinas grew up in Marshfield, Wisconsin, and graduated at the top of his class at Marshfield High School in 1950. He served in the United States Navy Reserve and was stationed for two years at Pearl Harbor Naval Shipyard. When he returned to Wisconsin, he first enrolled at the University of Wisconsin–Stevens Point. He transferred to the University of Wisconsin–Madison in 1955, and graduated from there in 1957.

== Career ==
=== National Collegiate Athletic Association ===
Neinas started his career working with Art Lentz at WHA (970 AM) radio station, as a broadcaster of Wisconsin Badgers football and Wisconsin Badgers men's basketball games until offered a position at the NCAA.

He joined the NCAA in 1961, becoming the organization's eighth employee and serving as assistant executive director. In that role, he worked under Walter Byers, a longtime executive director with whom he would later clash over television rights. He oversaw the Final Four (college basketball) games and the College World Series.

=== Big Eight Conference and US Olympic Committee ===
Neinas served as Big Eight Conference commissioner from 1971 to 1980.

He was a member of the US Olympic Committee board of directors for eight years, served on its initial development committee, and chaired the Olympic Basketball Committee from 1976 to 1980. He also chaired the NCAA Olympic and International Relations Committee that recommended the NCAA withdrawal from the USOC, a move that contributed to governance changes under the Amateur Sports Act of 1978.

=== College Football Association ===
Neinas left the Big Eight to become executive director of the College Football Association from 1980 to 1997. The CFA was an alliance of 63 major athletic programs formed to pursue greater control over television rights. During Neinas's tenure, the CFA negotiated a television agreement with NBC Sports in 1981, which led to an antitrust lawsuit challenging the NCAA’s control over football television contracts. During the Oklahoma antitrust trial, Neinas and Byers testified on opposite sides. The case ultimately reached the Supreme Court, and the resulting decision helped create the current environment in which conferences negotiate their own television contracts, contributing to subsequent waves of schools changing conferences in search of better deals. Prior to that ruling, the NCAA limited TV appearances by schools to five games over two seasons on two networks. John Paul Stevens wrote for the majority, which determined on a 7-2 vote that media rights are the property of universities and not the NCAA.

According to The Atlantic, Byers never forgave Neinas, his former deputy, for leading the challenge to the NCAA's control of college football television rights. In his 1995 memoir, Byers criticized the CFA's pursuit of television revenue while still expecting the NCAA to enforce amateurism rules.

Under Neinas, the CFA was influential in implementing Proposition 48, an NCAA regulation that mandated minimum academic achievement for incoming freshmen to be eligible to play in NCAA Division I. Neinas also oversaw CFA television agreements with ABC, CBS, NBC, and ESPN between 1984 and 1995, and advocated for NCAA legislation to strengthen academic standards, require continuing progress toward a degree for eligibility, and formalize recruiting calendars that reduced booster and alumni involvement.

Following the federal passage of Title IX, Neinas helped prepare universities schools for the creation of the Association for Intercollegiate Athletics for Women and its eventual absorption into the NCAA.

=== Neinas Sports Services ===
In 1997, he founded Neinas Sports Services, one of the first firms specializing in executive searches for athletic directors and coaches. In this role, he helped place Joe Castiglione and Bob Stoops at Oklahoma, Mack Brown at Texas, Mark Richt at Georgia Bulldogs, and Mark Dantonio at Michigan State Spartans. By 2006, Neinas had assisted with 30 football coach searches and said his fees were "basically the same" for each school. One such search was at San Diego State University, which paid his firm $30,000 to assist with the process that led to Chuck Long's hiring as head football coach. In 2016, the University of Maryland paid the Neinas Sports Services $50,000 in the search leading to the hiring of football coach D. J. Durkin. Neinas said he often reported to his clients verbally rather than through written documents in order to avoid have his recommendations revealed publicly through open-records requests.

Neinas also served as chairman of the board of Ascent Entertainment Group, which owned the Colorado Avalanche, Denver Nuggets, and Ball Arena. He was CEO of Ascent in 2000 when the group sold those holdings to Liberty Media.

=== Big 12 Conference ===
Neinas returned to college athletics from 2011 to 2012 to serve as interim commissioner of the Big 12 Conference, helping stabilize the conference following the departures of Colorado Buffaloes, Nebraska Cornhuskers, Missouri Tigers, and Texas A&M Aggies. He helped secure a grant-of-rights agreement through 2025, under which schools leaving the conference would forfeit their television revenue. During his tenure at the Big 12, the conference added the TCU Horned Frogs and West Virginia Mountaineers. He was also part of the group of conference commissioners who approved the creation of the College Football Playoff. During his first three months as interim commissioner in 2011, he was paid at a projected annual rate of approximately $1.4 million, according to a federal tax return released to news organizations. Since 2012, the Big 12’s top football coaching honor has been the Chuck Neinas Award, selected annually by votes from the conference’s head coaches.

In 2016, the University of Cincinnati enlisted his wife's firm, Pacey Economics, to analyze the Cincinnati Bearcats' chances of joining the Big 12. The school said it did not use her relationship with Neinas to gain an advantage over other programs seeking to join the conference. Pacey Economics performed its services for Cincinnati free of charge. Cincinnati joined the Big 12 in 2023.

In 2018, Neinas made a gift to the University of Wisconsin–Stevens Point's School of Health Sciences and Wellness to create the Neinas Concussion Initiative to support concussion research.

== Honors and awards ==
In 1996, Neinas received the Amos Alonzo Stagg Award, the highest honor presented by the American Football Coaches Association.

He was honored in 1999 by the National Football Foundation and College Football Hall of Fame for his contributions to amateur football and received a lifetime achievement recognition from the National College Football Awards Association.

In 1990, Sports Illustrated ranked Neinas No. 75 on its list of the most powerful people in sports, and in 2003 the magazine ranked him as the 10th most powerful person in college football.

In 2020, the American Football Coaches Association gave Neinas the Tuss McLaughry Award, named in honor of DeOrmond "Tuss" McLaughry.

In 2024, he received the Champions Award from the Coca-Cola Bowl Season Hall of Fame.

== Personal life ==
He married economist Patricia Pacey in 1981, and they had two children: Toby and Andy. Toby is the director of player personnel for Rutgers Scarlet Knights football. Andy is the owner of Echo Canyon River Expeditions, a white water river rafting outfitter in Cañon City, Colorado.

Neinas died on December 16, 2025, in Boulder, Colorado, at the age of 93.
