= Arthur Lentz =

American sports administrator (1908–1974)

- Born: Arthur G. Lentz; November 17, 1908; Milwaukee, Wisconsin, U.S.
- Died: January 25, 1974 (aged 65); New York, New York, U.S.
- Education: University of Iowa
- Occupation: Executive director of the United States Olympic Committee (1965–1973)
- Spouse: Florence Kyler
- Children: 6

Arthur G. Lentz (November 17, 1908 – January 25, 1974) was an American publicity director and administrator who was the executive director of the United States Olympic Committee from 1965 to 1973.

== Early life and career ==
Lentz was born in Milwaukee on November 17, 1908. He earned letters in football, basketball, track, and baseball in high school and competed in intramural athletics at the University of Iowa. After graduating from Iowa, Lentz became the university's director of student employment. He left after two years to work for Des Moines Register–Tribune. In 1933, he joined The Capital Times in Madison, Wisconsin, eventually becoming the assistant sports editor. In 1946, he became the sports public relations director at the University of Wisconsin–Madison, where he also called Wisconsin Badgers football and basketball games at WHA-AM with Chuck Neinas.

== United States Olympic Committee ==
Lentz left Wisconsin in 1956 to become the public relations director for the United States Olympic Committee. He became assistant executive director three years later and was promoted to executive director in 1965. During his tenure, the USOC was caught up in a power struggle between National Collegiate Athletic Association and the Amateur Athletic Union which negatively impacted amateur sports in the United States.

Following the 1972 Summer Olympics, which included two of the country's runners not showing up to a race on time, a political protest by two other runners that led to their ban, swimmer Rick DeMont being stripped of his gold medal because he tested positive for a prohibited substance, and a controversial loss to the Soviet Union in the 1972 Olympic men's basketball final, there was a demand for change at the USOC. Lentz, who was in poor health, resigned and was succeeded by his assistant, F. Don Miller. He died on January 25, 1974 from a respiratory ailment.
