= Peter Breen (figure skater) =

American ice dancer (born 1969)

Personal information
- Full name: Peter Breen
- Born: October 29, 1969 (age 56) Brockton, Massachusetts, U.S.

Figure skating career
- Country: United States

Peter Breen (born October 29, 1969) is an American former competitive ice dancer. With partner Rachel Mayer, he is the 1992 U.S. national silver medalist. They represented the United States at the 1992 Winter Olympics where they placed 15th.

Following that partnership, Breen teamed up with Kate Robinson. They are the 1997 U.S. bronze medalists.

Breen is currently a physical therapist and works with elite figure skaters such as Stephen Carriere and Katrina Hacker.

== Results ==
GP: Champions Series (Grand Prix)

=== With Mayer ===
International
Event	87–88	88–89	89–90	90–91	91–92	92–93	93–94
Winter Olympics					15th		
World Championships					15th		
International de Paris						8th	
Skate America					6th		8th
Skate Canada				7th			
Nebelhorn Trophy							2nd
International: Junior
World Junior Champ.	9th						
National
U.S. Championships		1st J		6th	2nd	5th	
J = Junior level

=== With Robinson ===
International
Event	1994–95	1995–96	1996–97	1997–98
GP NHK Trophy			8th	9th
GP Skate America			9th	
GP Trophée de France / Trophée Lalique		12th	11th	8th
Lysiane Lauret Challenge	8th		7th	
Nebelhorn Trophy				
Basler Cup	1st			
National
U.S. Championships	4th	4th	3rd	5th
