= Tammy Gambill =

American figure skater

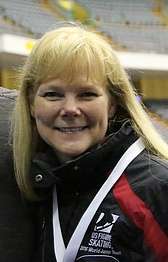
- Tammy Gambill at the 2016 Four Continents Championship
- Occupation: skating coach

Tammy Gambill is an American figure skating coach and former national-level skater. Several of her students have medaled at international competitions and three have competed at the Olympics. She has also won the 2005 USOC Developmental Coach Award.

== Early years ==
Gambill grew up in Sacramento, California. She first went ice skating with her Blue Bird troop. Her older sister was a competitive swimmer, but since Gambill didn't have the talent, she convinced her parents to let her take figure skating lessons. When she was 13, she moved to Los Angeles, to work with a top coach. She lived with a host family and qualified to the U.S. Championships.

== Coaching career ==
Gambill began coaching at age 19 in northern California before moving to Redlands, California in the 1990s. She began coaching in Icetown in Riverside, California when it opened in 1997. In May 2018, she agreed to coach at the World Arena Ice Hall in Colorado Springs, Colorado, beginning on June 25.

Her current students include:

- (United States) Karen Chen (2017 U.S. national champion, 2018 Olympian, 2022 Olympic Team event gold medalist)
- (Hong Kong) Yi Christy Leung (2019 Chinese national champion)
- (United States) Audrey Shin (2020 Skate America bronze medalist)
- (Philippines) Sofia Frank (Two-time Philippine national champion (2023, 2024))
- (United States) Clare Seo (2022 U.S. junior national champion)
- (South Korea) Ji Seo-yeon
- (United States) Elyce Lin-Gracey
- (Thailand) Phattaratida Kaneshige
- (United States) Amber Glenn (2024 U.S. national champion, 2023 U.S. national bronze medalist, 2023 Skate America bronze medalist)
- (United States) Logan Higase-Chen (2024 U.S. junior national champion)
- (Spain) Emilia Murdock

Her former students include:

- (United States) Lindsay Davis
- (United States) Amanda Dobbs
- (United States) Richard Dornbush (2014 Lombardia Trophy champion, 2010–11 JGP Final champion, 2011 U.S. national silver medalist)
- (United States) Austin Kanallakan
- (United States) Ellie Kawamura
- (United States) Leah Keiser
- (Australia) Brendan Kerry (2014 Olympian)
- Vanessa Lam
- (Chinese Taipei) Amy Lin (Two-time Taiwanese champion (2016, 2017))
- (United States) Hannah Miller
- (Japan) Daisuke Murakami
- (United States) Shotaro Omori
- (Ukraine) Yaroslav Paniot
- (United States) Dennis Phan (2004 JGP Final champion and the 2003 U.S. national junior champion)
- (United States) Tyler Pierce (2014 U.S. national junior silver medalist)
- (United States) Sandra Rucker
- (United States) Ilana Sherman
- (United States) Caroline Zhang
- (United States) Camden Pulkinen
- (United States) Vincent Zhou (2017 World Junior champion, three-time U.S. national silver medalist (2017, 2019, 2021), 2018 Olympian)
- (South Korea) Young You (2020 Four Continents silver medalist, 4-time South Korean National champion (2015, 2018–20), 2019 Skate Canada bronze medalist, 2020 Youth Olympic champion)

She has received several awards including:

- 2005 USOC Developmental Coach Award
- 2005, 2012, 2013 U.S. Figure Skating / PSA Developmental Coach of the Year
- nominated for 2011 U.S. Figure Skating / PSA Coach of the Year

Gambill has also served on several U.S. Figure Skating committees, including Athlete Development Committee, Sports Sciences and Medicine Committee, and Coaches Committee. In 2006, she was chair of the Coaches Committee. She has been on the board of directors for both U.S. Figure Skating and Professional Skaters Association.
