= David Hoff =

American ice sledge hockey coach

- Born: October 22, 1967 (age 58) Bottineau, ND
- Coached for: United States men's national ice sledge hockey team

David Hoff (born October 22, 1967) is an American ice-sledge hockey coach. Hoff was part of the United States ice sledge hockey team who won gold at the 2018 Winter Paralympics.

Hoff was the Head coach of the U.S. 2026 Paralympic Sled Hockey Team that won gold at the 2026 Winter Paralympics.
