= Thomson SmartVision =

- Developer: Thomson
- Platform: Set-top box, mobile TV, Internet TV
- Website: Thomson IPTV

Thomson SmartVision is an update of the SmartVision service platform software, intended for use as a converged media service for set-top boxes, mobile TV, and PCs to access content in a time-delayed, on-demand, or linear manner. The content is agnostic to the network but adapted to different terminals to make it work. The latest version deployed is SmartVision 6.0. It was released 25 November 2008. Thomson SmartVision has been adopted by several tier 1 Telco operators.

== Overview ==
Thomson SmartVision includes all the features of Thales SmartVision, including support for on-demand and live video, video recording and time shifting, and an interactive program guide with integrated search and scheduled recording. SmartVision allows operators to create and manage TV channel bouquets and pay-per-view services. The end-user can select a program or a channel through an electronic program guide or a mosaic and watch multimedia content on various devices like TV sets, PC, mobile phone and portable Video Players. SmartVision incorporates facilities to encrypt videos and interfaces with all significant Conditional Access Systems to manage users’ licenses for live and pay-per-view services.

SmartVision can be interfaced with third-party platforms to propose interactive services such as weather forecasts, news, games, and other video applications. Viewers can interact with programs, select different views, participate in game shows, vote, or request more information on a commercial. SmartVision delivers a user interface that users can customize to match specific look-and-feel, branding, business models, or specific multimedia services to the homes.

SmartVision is designed to launch integrated TriplePlay services. It can be deployed with leading VoIP platforms such as Thomson's Cirpack Multi node-B. Telephony is integrated into the TV portal to manage voice features such as musical ring back tones or call forwards. Caller ID is shown on TV, and live programs automatically pause to let users answer calls. Voice mail and MMS are now accessed via the TV set.

Thomson has also joined Orange S.A. and Sagem as a founding member of a joint venture named Soft at Home, aimed at standardizing the digital household.
