= Philip O. Krumm =

American sports administrator (1906–1988)

- Born: Philip Otmar Krumm; October 9, 1906; Chicago, Illinois, U.S.
- Died: October 16, 1988 (aged 82); Divide, Colorado, U.S.
- Education: DePaul University
- Occupation: President of the United States Olympic Committee (1973–1977)
- Spouse(s): Agatha Loefgren (died 1968) Dorothy Hobson (m. 1970)
- Children: 3

Philip Otmar Krumm (October 9, 1906 – October 16, 1988) was an American businessmen who was president of the United States Olympic Committee from 1973 to 1977.

== Early life ==
Krumm was born on October 9, 1906 in Chicago. He attended night school at DePaul University while working in a real estate office.

== Business career ==
For eighteen years, Krumm was the purchasing director for the Sentinel Radio Corporation, where he helped the company obtain around $30 million in contracts. He left Sentinel in 1950 after he purchased controlling interest in the Niles Cabinet Co. In 1962, he formed a sales representative agency with his eldest son, Kent. He was also involved in housing development in Colorado.

== Athletics ==
Krumm was secretary of Amateur Skating Union and played a leading role in the construction of the country's first Olympic-style speed skating rink at the Wisconsin State Fair Park in West Allis, Wisconsin.

In 1961, Krumm was elected to the United States Olympic Committee's board of directors. He served as the committee's vice president for four years and was elected president in 1973. As president, Krumm oversaw the development of the United States Olympic Training Center in Colorado Springs, Colorado and also worked out a liaison system so that the USOC and other American athletic organizations would stop competing for athletes. He retired in 1977 and was succeeded by Robert Kane.

== Personal life ==
Krumm had three children with his first wife. She died in 1968 and in 1970, he married Dorothy Hobson. They resided on a 400-acre farm in Kenosha, Wisconsin. Krumm spent his later years in Divide, Colorado, where he died of a heart attack on October 16, 1988.
