= United States Olympic & Paralympic Committee =

- Country: United States
- Code: USA
- Created: December 6, 1894; 131 years ago
- Continental Association: PASO
- Headquarters: Colorado Springs, Colorado, U.S.
- President: Gene Sykes
- Secretary General: Sarah Hirshland
- Website: teamusa.com

U.S. Paralympics a division of the USOPC

National Paralympic Committee
- Country: United States
- Code: USA
- Recognized: January 23, 2001; 25 years ago
- Continental association: APC
- Headquarters: Colorado Springs, Colorado
- President: Dr. Cheri Blauwet
- Website: www.usopc.org/paralympic-sport-development

The United States Olympic & Paralympic Committee (USOPC) is the National Olympic Committee (NOC) and the National Paralympic Committee (NPC) for the United States. It was founded in 1895 and is headquartered in Colorado Springs, Colorado. The USOPC is one of only four NOCs in the world that also serve as the National Paralympic Committee for their country. The USOPC is responsible for supporting, entering and overseeing U.S. teams for the Olympic Games, Paralympic Games, Youth Olympic Games, Pan American Games, Parapan American Games and Junior Pan American Games and serves as the steward of the Olympic and Paralympic Movements in the United States.

The Olympic Movement is overseen by the International Olympic Committee (IOC). The IOC is supported by 35 international federations that govern each sport on a global level and the 207 National Olympic Committees that oversee Olympic sport as a whole in their respective nations, and national federations that administer each sport at the national level (called national governing bodies, or NGBs, in the United States). The National Paralympic Committee is the sole governing body responsible for the selection and training of all athletes participating in the Paralympic Games.

The USOPC is one of 207 NOCs and 176 NPCs within the international Olympic and Paralympic movements. Forty-seven NGBs are members of the USOPC. Fifteen of the NGBs also manage sports on the Paralympic program (there are fewer Paralympic sports in the world). While the USOPC governs four Paralympic sports (cycling, skiing, swimming, and track & field), five other Paralympic sports are governed by U.S. members of International Paralympic Federations (wheelchair basketball, boccia, goalball, powerlifting, and wheelchair rugby).

Unlike most other nations, the United States government does not have a ministry of sports and does not fund its Olympic committee. This is in part due to the taboo of mixing sports and politics in the U.S. The USOPC was reorganized by the Ted Stevens Olympic and Amateur Sports Act, originally enacted in 1978. It is a federally chartered nonprofit corporation and does not receive federal financial support (other than for select Paralympic military programs). Pursuant to the Act, the USOPC has the exclusive right to use and authorize the use of Olympic-related marks, images and terminology in the United States. The USOPC licenses that right to sponsors as a means of generating revenue in support of its mission.

Founded as the American Olympic Committee (AOC) and having been known since the 1960s as the United States Olympic Committee (USOC), the organization changed its name to the USOPC on June 20, 2019, becoming the first Olympic Committee in the world to include the word Paralympic in its name.

== History ==
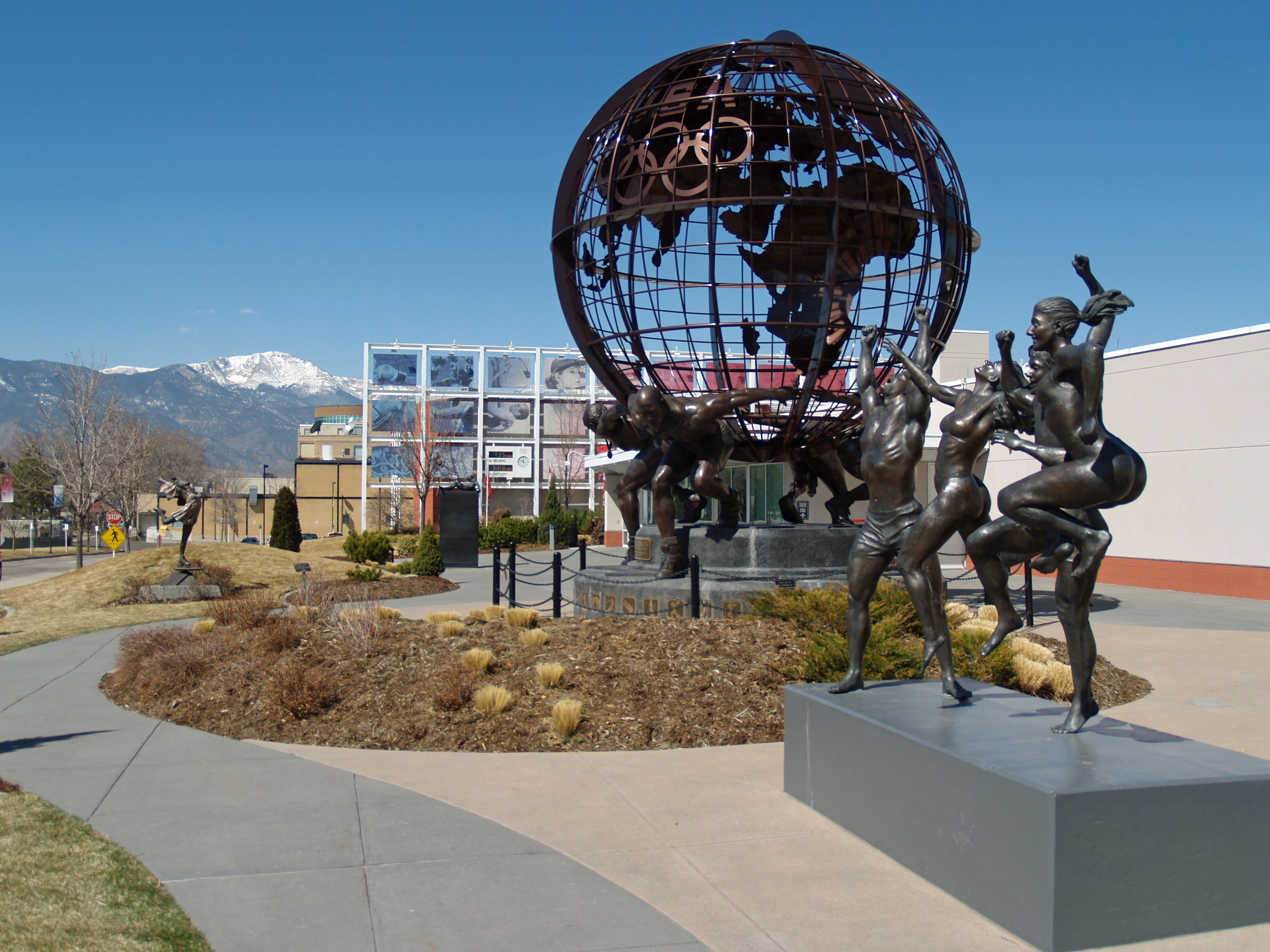
U.S. Olympic Committee headquarters in Colorado Springs, Colorado

United States Olympic and Paralympic Committee logo

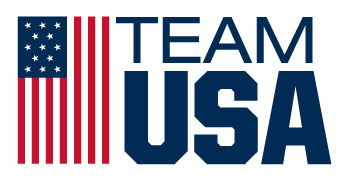
Team USA logo

U.S. Olympic Team logo

Upon the founding of the International Olympic Committee in 1894, the two American IOC members – James Edward Sullivan and William Milligan Sloane – formed a committee to organize the participation of American athletes in the 1896 Summer Olympics, in Athens, Greece. In 1921, the committee adopted a constitution and bylaws to formally organize the American Olympic Association.

From 1928 to 1953, its president was Avery Brundage, who later went on to become the president of the IOC, the only American to do so.

In 1940, the AOA changed its name to the United States of America Sports Federation and, in 1945, changed it again to the United States Olympic Association. In 1950, federal mandate allowed the USOA to solicit tax-deductible contributions as a private, non-profit corporation. After several constitutional revisions were made to the federal charter in 1961, the name was changed to the United States Olympic Committee.

The Amateur Sports Act of 1978 (later renamed in the Ted Stevens Olympic and Amateur Sports Act) established the USOPC, then referred to as the USOC (United States Olympic Committee), as the coordinating body for all Olympic-related athletic activity in the United States, specifically relating to international competition. The USOPC was also given the responsibility of promoting and supporting physical fitness and public participation in athletic activities by encouraging developmental programs in its member organizations. The provisions protect individual athletes, and provide the USOPC's counsel and authority to oversee Olympic and Paralympic business in the United States.

The public law not only protects the trademarks of the IOC and USOPC, but also gives the USOPC exclusive rights to the words "Olympic", "Olympiad" and "Citius, Altius, Fortius", as well as commercial use of Olympic and Paralympic marks and terminology in the United States, excluding Northern Mariana Islands, American Samoa, Guam, Puerto Rico and the U.S. Virgin Islands, which fall under the authority of separate NOCs and NPCs.

One of the many revolutionary elements contained within the legislation was the Paralympic Amendment – an initiative that fully integrated the Paralympic Movement into the USOPC by Congressional mandate in 1998.

U.S. Paralympics, a division of the USOPC, was founded in 2001. In addition to selecting and managing the teams which compete for the United States in the Paralympic Games, U.S. Paralympics is also responsible for supporting Paralympic community and military sports programs around the country. In 2006, the USOPC created the Paralympic Military Program with the goal of providing Paralympic sports as a part of the rehabilitation process for injured soldiers. Through the U.S. Olympic Committee Paralympic Military Program, USOPC hosted the Warrior Games for wounded service personnel from 2010 to 2014, until the organization of the event was taken on by the Department of Defense in 2015.

The USOPC moved its headquarters from New York City to Colorado Springs on July 1, 1978. The USOPC headquarters moved to its present location in downtown Colorado Springs in April 2010, while the previous site – located just 2 miles (3 km) away – remains a U.S. Olympic Training Center.

In October 2007, the ARCO Training Center in Chula Vista, California (see below) was closed temporarily due to the Harris Fire, one of many that ravaged southern California.

After convening in 2010 the Working Group for Safe Training Environments, the USOPC formed the Safe Sport program to address child sexual abuse, bullying, hazing and harassment and emotional, physical and sexual misconduct within its domain.

In February 2011, the USOPC launched an anti-steroid campaign in conjunction with the Ad Council called "Play Asterisk Free" aimed at teens. The campaign first launched in 2008 under the name "Don't Be An Asterisk".

The state-of-the-art United States Olympic & Paralympic Museum was officially opened in Colorado Springs on July 30, 2020.

The USOPC remains one of the only National Olympic Committees in the world to receive no government funding.

== Governance ==
The USOPC is governed by a 16-member board of directors, led by a chairman, and has a professional staff, headed by a CEO. The USOPC also has three constituent councils to serve as sources of opinion and advice to the board and USOPC staff, including the Athletes' Advisory Council (AAC), National Governing Bodies Council (NGBC), and Multi-Sport Organizations Council. The AAC and NGBC each have three representatives on the board, while six members of the board are independent. The USOPC CEO and all US members of the IOC and IPC (Anita DeFrantz, James Easton, and Angela Ruggiero) are ex officio members of the board.

The USOPC named Scott Blackmun CEO on January 6, 2010. Blackmun previously served as acting chief executive officer (2001), senior managing director of sport (2000), and general counsel (1999). He also serves on the IOC's Marketing Commission and on the board of the National Foundation for Fitness, Sports, and Nutrition. He retired in 2018 and was replaced by Sarah Hirshland.

On October 2, 2008, Lawrence F. Probst III was elected chairman of the USOPC board of directors. Probst also serves on the IOC's International Relations Commission, a post he assumed by IOC appointment on March 10, 2011. Probst retired in 2019 and was replaced by Susanne Lyons.

Presidents
President	Term
Albert Spalding	1900—1904
David R. Francis	1904—1906
Caspar Whitney	1906—1910
Frederic B. Pratt	1910—1912
Robert M. Thompson	1912—1920
Gustavus T. Kirby	1920—1924
Robert M. Thompson	1924—1926
William C. Prout	1926—1927
Henry G. Lapham (interim)	1927
Douglas MacArthur	1927—1928
Avery Brundage	1928—1953
Tug Wilson	1953—1965
Doug Roby	1965—1968
Franklin Orth	1968—1970
Cliff Buck	1970—1973
Philip O. Krumm	1973—1977
Robert Kane	1977—1981
William E. Simon	1981—1985
John B. Kelly Jr.	1985
Robert Helmick (interim)	1985
Robert H. Helmick	1985—1991
Bill Hybl (interim)	1991—1992
LeRoy T. Walker	1992—1996
Bill Hybl	1996—1999
Sandra Baldwin	2000—2002
Marty Mankamyer (interim)	2002
Marty Mankamyer	2002—2003
William C. Martin (interim)	2003—2004

Chairs
Chairs	Term
Peter Ueberroth	2004—2008
Larry Probst	2008—2019
Susanne Lyons	2019—2022
Gene Sykes	2023—present

Executive directors/CEOs
Executive director/CEO	Term
J. Lyman Bingham	1950–1965
Arthur Lentz	1965–1973
F. Don Miller	1973–1985
George D. Miller	1985–1987
Baaron Pittenger (acting)	1987–1988
Harvey Schiller	1988
Baaron Pittenger	1988—1990
Harvey Schiller	1990–1994
John Krimsky (interim)	Aug 1994–1995
Dick Schultz	1995—2000
Norm Blake	March—Dec 2000
Scott Blackmun (interim)	Dec 2000–2001
Lloyd Ward	2001—March 2003
Jim Scherr (acting)	2003—2005
Jim Scherr	2005—2009
Stephanie Streeter	March—Oct 2009
Scott Blackmun	2010—Feb 2018
Susanne Lyons (interim)	March 2018—January 2019
Sarah Hirshland	January 2019—present

== National Governing Body members ==
National Governing Bodies are organizations that look after all aspects of their individual sports. The NGBs are responsible for the training, competition and development of athletes for their sports, as well as nominating athletes to the U.S. Olympic, Paralympic, Youth Olympic, Pan American, and Para-Pan American Teams. There are currently 39 Olympic summer sport NGBs in the United States and eight Olympic winter sport NGBs. Sport climbing, skateboarding, and surfing were added to the Olympic roster of sports for the 2020 Olympics in Tokyo, Japan. Some Olympic sports are not featured in the Paralympics, that is why there are more solely Olympic NGBs rather than those that manage both Olympic and Paralympic divisions. Additionally, some Paralympic sports, like wheelchair basketball, boccia, goalball, powerlifting, and wheelchair rugby, are governed by U.S. members of International Paralympic Federations.

National Governing Body	Summer or Winter	Olympic program?	Paralympic program?	Headquarters
USA Archery	Summer	yes	yes	Colorado Springs, Colorado
USA Badminton	Summer	yes	yes	Anaheim, California
USA Baseball	Summer	yes	no	Durham, North Carolina
USA Basketball	Summer	yes	no	Colorado Springs, Colorado
U.S. Biathlon	Winter	yes	yes	New Gloucester, Maine
USA Bobsled and Skeleton	Winter	yes	no	Colorado Springs, Colorado
U.S. Bowling Congress	Summer	no	no	Arlington, Texas
USA Boxing	Summer	yes	no	Colorado Springs, Colorado
American Canoe	Summer	yes	no	Fredericksburg, Virginia
USA Cheer (affiliated)	Summer	no	no	Memphis, Tennessee
USA Cricket (affiliated)	Summer	no (Note: The sport will be included in the 2028 Summer Olympics in Los Angeles.)	no	Dallas, Texas
USA Climbing	Summer	yes	no	Salt Lake City, Utah
USA Curling	Winter	yes	yes	Stevens Point, Wisconsin
USA Cycling	Summer	yes	yes	Colorado Springs, Colorado
USA Dance (affiliated)	Summer	no	no	Colorado Springs, Colorado
USA Diving	Summer	yes	no	Indianapolis, Indiana
US Equestrian	Summer	yes	yes	Lexington, Kentucky
US Fencing	Summer	yes	yes	Colorado Springs, Colorado
USA Field Hockey	Summer	yes	no	Virginia Beach, Virginia
U.S. Figure Skating	Winter	yes	no	Colorado Springs, Colorado
USA Football (affiliated)	Summer	no (Note: A variant of the sport called flag football will be included in the 2028 Summer Olympics in Los Angeles.)	no	Indianapolis, Indiana
USA Golf	Summer	yes	no	St. Augustine, Florida
USA Gymnastics	Summer	yes	no	Indianapolis, Indiana
USA Hockey	Winter	yes	yes	Colorado Springs, Colorado
USA Judo	Summer	yes	yes	Colorado Springs, Colorado
USA Karate	Summer	yes	no	Colorado Springs, Colorado
USA Kickboxing (affiliated)	Summer	no	no	Huntley, Illinois
USA Lacrosse (affiliated)	Summer	no	no	Sparks, Maryland
USA Luge	Winter	yes	no	Lake Placid, New York
USA Modern Pentathlon	Summer	yes	no	Colorado Springs, Colorado
USA Muaythai (affiliated)	Summer	no	no	Houston, Texas
US Polo Association (affiliated)	Summer	no	no	Lake Worth, Florida
Orienteering USA (affiliated)	Summer	no	no	Arlington, Virginia
USA Racquetball	Summer	no	no	Colorado Springs, Colorado
USA Roller Sports	Summer	no	no	Lincoln, Nebraska
US Rowing	Summer	yes	yes	Princeton, New Jersey
USA Rugby	Summer	yes	no	Boulder, Colorado
US Sailing	Summer	yes	yes	Portsmouth, Rhode Island
USA Shooting	Summer	yes	yes	Colorado Springs, Colorado
USA Skateboarding	Summer	yes	no	Santa Monica, California
U.S. Ski & Snowboard	Winter	yes	yes	Park City, Utah
U.S. Soccer Federation	Summer	yes	yes	Chicago, Illinois
USA Softball	Summer	yes	yes	Oklahoma City, Oklahoma
US Speedskating	Winter	yes	no	Kearns, Utah
US Squash	Summer	no	no	New York, New York
USA Surfing	Summer	yes	no	San Juan Capistrano, California
USA Swimming	Summer	yes	no	Colorado Springs, Colorado
USA Synchro	Summer	yes	no	Indianapolis, Indiana
USA Table Tennis	Summer	yes	yes	Colorado Springs, Colorado
USA Taekwondo	Summer	yes	no	Colorado Springs, Colorado
USA Team Handball	Summer	yes	no	Colorado Springs, Colorado
US Tennis	Summer	yes	yes	White Plains, New York
USA Track & Field	Summer	yes	no	Indianapolis, Indiana
USA Triathlon	Summer	yes	yes	Colorado Springs, Colorado
USA Ultimate (affiliated)	Summer	no	no	Colorado Springs, Colorado
Underwater Society of America (affiliated)	Summer	no	no	Daly City, California
USA Volleyball	Summer	yes	yes	Colorado Springs, Colorado
USA Water Polo	Summer	yes	no	Huntington Beach, California
USA Water Ski	Summer	no	no	Polk City, Florida
USA Weightlifting	Summer	yes	no	Colorado Springs, Colorado
USA Wrestling	Summer	yes	no	Colorado Springs, Colorado

== Fundraising efforts ==
The United States Olympic & Paralympic Committee is a 501(c)(3) not-for-profit corporation supported by American individuals and corporate sponsors. Unlike most other nations, the USOPC does not receive direct government funding for Olympic programs (except for select Paralympic military programs).

The USOPC's main sources of revenue are television broadcast rights, sponsorships and philanthropy in the form of major gifts and direct mail income. Additional funding comes from the government for Paralympic programming, as well as other sources such as the city of Colorado Springs and the U.S. Olympic and Paralympic Foundation.

The USOPC asks for contributions from time to time using public service announcements and other direct solicitations. Also, some proceeds from sales in its online store benefit the committee.

The USOPC currently does not hold telethons or other fundraising events, but has in the past.

== Criticism ==
There has been some financial conflict between the USOPC and International Olympic Committee (IOC), with some pointing out the frequent leadership changes of USOPC, and USOPC trying to broadcast the Olympics using its own television network, which the IOC discouraged. USOPC president Peter Ueberroth allegedly stonewalled a negotiation between IOC and USOPC to discuss the revenue sharing of the US broadcasts with IOC. Under a long-standing contract, the USOPC has received a 20 percent share of global sponsorship revenue and a 12.75 percent cut of U.S. broadcast rights deals (not that much given the fact that the USOPC is the only NOC in the world not to receive government funding, other countries fund their Olympic Committees, plus more than a half of the Olympic global sponsors are American companies, but the USOPC received only 20% (not 50%) of sponsorship revenue). The IOC believed the USOPC share, set out in an open-ended contract dating to 1996, was excessive and should be renegotiated. The USOPC argued that it saved the Olympic movement by hosting the most financially successful Games in the history of the Olympics in 1984. In the 1980s, after the disastrous and unprofitable 1976 and 1980 Olympics, many believed the Olympic movement was in decline. However, the U.S. hosted the most financially successful games without government funding (unlike Montreal 1976 and Moscow 1980) and revitalized the Olympic movement. The failure of the 2012 and 2016 US Olympic bids was partly blamed by some on USOPC. For instance, NBC television executive Dick Ebersol said after the failed 2016 bid, "This was the IOC membership saying to the USOPC there will be no more domestic Olympics until you give more to the IOC". A new revenue-sharing agreement was signed in 2012.

USOPC has also been criticized for not providing equal funding to Paralympic athletes, compared to Olympic athletes. In 2003, a lawsuit was filed by American Paralympic athletes Tony Iniguez, Scot Hollonbeck and Jacob Heilveil. They alleged that the USOPC was underfunding American Paralympic athletes. Iniguez cited the fact that the USOPC made health care benefits available to a smaller percentage of Paralympians, provided smaller quarterly training stipends and paid smaller financial awards for medals won at the Paralympics. American Paralympians saw this as a disadvantage for Paralympic athletes, as nations such as Canada and the United Kingdom support Paralympians and Olympians virtually equally. The USOPC did not deny the discrepancy in funding, but contended that this was due to the fact that it did not receive any government financial support. As a result, it had to rely on revenue generated by the media exposure of its athletes. Olympic athletic success resulted in greater exposure for the USOPC than Paralympic athletic achievements. The case was heard by lower courts, who ruled that the USOPC has the right to allocate its finances to athletes at different rates. The case was appealed to the Supreme Court, who on September 6, 2008, announced that it would not hear the appeal. However, during the time the lawsuit had lasted (from 2003 to 2008), the funding of Paralympic athletes more than tripled. In 2008, $11.4 million was earmarked for Paralympic athletes, up from $3 million in 2004. In 2018, the USOPC announced it would increase its Operation Gold Awards for U.S. Paralympic athletes to be equal to payments earned by U.S. Olympic athletes.

In 2003, Wade Exum, the United States Olympic Committee's director of drug control administration from 1991 to 2000, gave copies of documents to Sports Illustrated that revealed that some 100 American athletes failed drug tests from 1988 to 2000, arguing that they should have been prevented from competing in the Olympics but were nevertheless cleared to compete; among those athletes were Carl Lewis, Joe DeLoach and Floyd Heard. Before showing the documents to Sports Illustrated, Exum tried to use them in a lawsuit against USOC, accusing the organization of racial discrimination and wrongful termination against him and cover-up over the failed tests. His case was summarily dismissed by the Denver federal Court for lack of evidence. The USOC claimed his case "baseless" as he himself was the one in charge of screening the anti-doping test program of the organization and clarifying that the athletes were cleared according to the rules.

Carl Lewis broke his silence on allegations that he was the beneficiary of a drugs cover-up, admitting he had failed tests for banned substances, but claiming he was just one of "hundreds" of American athletes who were allowed to escape bans, concealed by the USOC. Lewis has acknowledged that he failed three tests during the 1988 US Olympic trials, which under international rules at the time should have prevented him from competing in the 1988 Summer Olympics. Former athletes and officials came out against the USOC cover-up. "For so many years I lived it. I knew this was going on, but there's absolutely nothing you can do as an athlete. You have to believe governing bodies are doing what they are supposed to do. And it is obvious they did not," said former American sprinter and 1984 Olympic champion, Evelyn Ashford.

Exum's documents revealed that Carl Lewis had tested positive three times at the 1988 Olympics trials for minimum amounts of pseudoephedrine, ephedrine, and phenylpropanolamine, which were banned stimulants. Bronchodilators are also found in cold medication. Due to the rules, his case could have led to disqualification from the Seoul Olympics and suspension from competition for six months. The levels of the combined stimulants registered in the separate tests were 2 ppm, 4 ppm and 6 ppm. Lewis defended himself, claiming that he had accidentally consumed the banned substances. After the supplements that he had taken were analyzed to prove his claims, the USOC accepted his claim of inadvertent use, since a dietary supplement he ingested was found to contain "Ma huang", the Chinese name for Ephedra (ephedrine is known to help weight loss). Fellow Santa Monica Track Club teammates Joe DeLoach and Floyd Heard were also found to have the same banned stimulants in their systems, and were cleared to compete for the same reason. The highest level of the stimulants Lewis recorded was 6 ppm, which was regarded as a positive test in 1988 but is now regarded as negative test. The acceptable level has been raised to ten parts per million for ephedrine and twenty-five parts per million for other substances. According to the IOC rules at the time, positive tests with levels lower than 10 ppm were cause of further investigation but not immediate ban. Neal Benowitz, a professor of medicine at UC San Francisco who is an expert on ephedrine and other stimulants, agreed that "These [levels] are what you'd see from someone taking cold or allergy medicines and are unlikely to have any effect on performance." Following Exum's revelations the IAAF acknowledged that at the 1988 Olympic Trials the USOC indeed followed the correct procedures in dealing with eight positive findings for ephedrine and ephedrine-related compounds in low concentration. Additionally, in 1988 the federation reviewed the relevant documents with the athletes' names undisclosed and stated that "the medical committee felt satisfied, however, on the basis of the information received that the cases had been properly concluded by the USOC as 'negative cases' in accordance with the rules and regulations in place at the time and no further action was taken".

In the run-up to the 2012 Summer Olympics, it was discovered that the American uniforms for the Games' opening and closing ceremonies, designed by Ralph Lauren, were manufactured in China. This sparked criticism of the USOPC from media pundits, the public and members of Congress.

In 2018, the USOPC came under fire for its complicity in the sexual assault and abuse of women and girls at the hands of former USA Gymnastics national team doctor Larry Nassar. Olympian Aly Raisman released a public statement accusing the committee of failing "to acknowledge its role in this mess." In the wake of Nasar's convictions, more than 150 lawsuits are pending against people and institutions related to the case, including the USOPC. In May 2018, the USOPC was accused of knowingly participating in sex trafficking in a class-action lawsuit. In response, the committee said it was "aggressively exploring and implementing new ways to enhance athlete safety".

== Training facilities ==
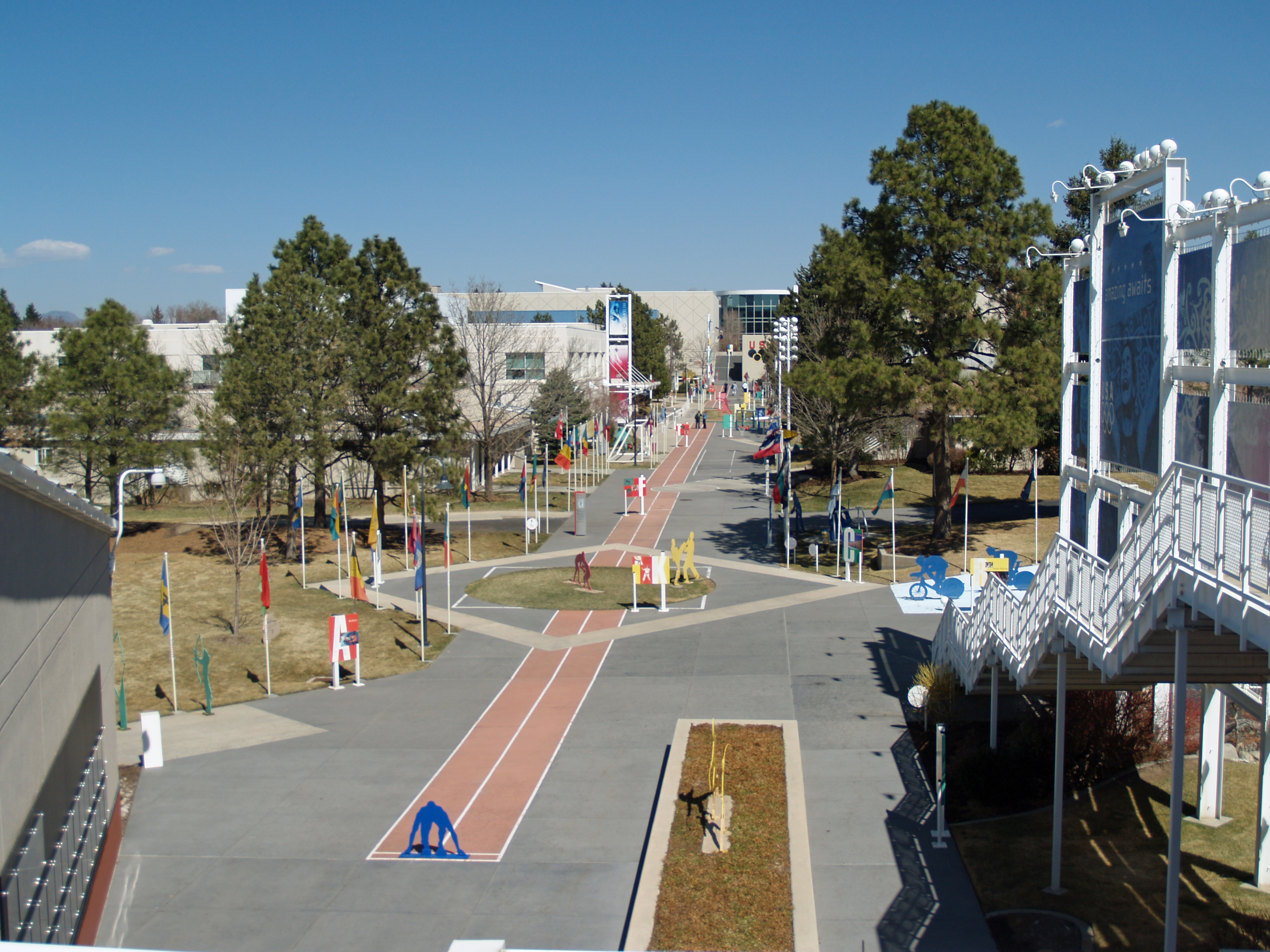
The grounds of the training facilities in Colorado Springs

The USOPC operates Olympic Training Centers at which aspiring Olympians prepare for international competition:

- The main facility in Colorado Springs, Colorado, offers both summer and winter sports training in a variety of sports. It houses the USOPC headquarters and many permanent athletic venues.
- The U.S. Olympic Center in Lake Placid, New York, is a facility for winter sports athletes. Permanent facilities include an ice hockey/figure skating arena, a bobsled run, and a luge run.

Although catered toward elite athlete training, these complexes are also open to the public (the only Olympic training facilities in the world to be open to the public) and offer a variety of services, including tours and regular camps and competitions for various domestic and international sport programs.

Additionally, the USOPC partners with 16 elite training sites across the country, to provide U.S. athletes with Olympic-caliber facilities that positively impact performance. Facilities with U.S. Olympic training site designation have invested millions of dollars in operating, staffing, equipment and training costs. These sites are often selected to host U.S. Olympic Team Trials and support Team USA athletes prepare for the Olympic Games.

== Awards ==
The USOPC administers a number of awards and honors for individuals and teams who have significant achievements in Olympic and Paralympic sports, or who have made contributions to the Olympic and Paralympic movement in the U.S.

- USOPC Athlete of the Year – Awards are given annually to the top overall male athlete, female athlete, Paralympic athlete, and team, from among the USOPC's member organizations.
- USOPC Coach of the Year – Awards are given annually to the top national, developmental, Paralympic, and volunteer coaches, and for achievement in sports science.
- U.S. Olympic Hall of Fame – The Hall of Fame honors Olympic and Paralympic athletes, teams, coaches, and others who have demonstrated extraordinary service to the U.S. Olympic movement.
- U.S. Olympic Spirit Award – This award is given biennially to athletes demonstrating spirit, courage, and achievement at the Olympic and Paralympic Games.
- Jack Kelly Fair Play Award – presented annually to an athlete, coach or official in recognition of an outstanding act of fair play and sportsmanship displayed during the past year.
- Rings of Gold Award – Awards are presented annually in honor of an individual and a program dedicated to helping children develop their Olympic or Paralympic dreams and reach their highest athletic and personal potential.
- Olympic Torch Award – presented annually to an individual who has positively impacted the Olympic Movement and has contributed to promoting the Olympic Ideals throughout the U.S.

When a US athlete wins an Olympic medal, as of 2016, the USOPC paid the winner $25,000 for gold, $15,000 for silver, and $10,000 for bronze. The USOPC increased the payouts by 25% to $37,000 for gold, $22,500 for silver, and $15,000 for bronze beginning in 2017. These numbers are significantly lower than in other countries, where Olympic gold medalists receive up to $1 million from their governments for a gold medal. Since 2018, payouts to Paralympic athletes have been the same as to the Olympians. The International Paralympic Committee noted that "'Operation Gold Awards' for [American] Paralympic athletes [would] be increased by as much as 400 percent."

== ANOC Awards ==
- Association of National Olympic Committees Gala Awards 2014: Most Successful NOC of London 2012

== Partnerships ==
The USOPC generates support from two principal types of Olympic sponsorship: worldwide and domestic. Each level of sponsorship grants companies different marketing rights and offers exclusive use of designated Olympic and Team USA images and marks. Under the domestic sponsorship program, the USOPC also has special partnerships with various licensees, suppliers and outfitters that provide vital services and products to support Team USA. Across all levels of sponsorship, the USOPC is committed to preserving the values of the Olympic properties and protecting the exclusive rights of Olympic sponsors.

=== Worldwide ===
Created by the International Olympic Committee in 1985, the Olympic Partners TOP program is the highest level of Olympic sponsorship, granting exclusive worldwide marketing rights to the Olympic Games and Winter Olympic Games. Managed by the IOC, the TOP program supports the OCOGs, NOCs and the IOC.

Operating on a four-year term in line with each Olympic quadrennium, the TOP program features approximately 10 worldwide Olympic Partners, with each receiving exclusive global marketing rights within a designated product or service category.

=== US Domestic ===
The Olympic Games domestic sponsorship program grants marketing rights within the host country or territory only. Under the direction of the IOC, the USOPC manages the domestic program within the United States. Like the worldwide TOP program, the domestic sponsorship program operates on the principle of product-category exclusivity. Approximately 20 corporations currently participate in the U.S. domestic sponsorship program, which enables the USOPC to deliver increased funding and equitable distribution to National Governing Bodies. The establishment of these long-term domestic partnerships helps generate independent financial stability for American athletes while ensuring the viability of the Team USA on the international stage.

=== Licensees ===
The USOPC has granted licensing rights to nearly three dozen companies to manufacture and distribute official licensed products, which convey the rich history of American culture and commemorates the Olympic Movement. These companies are referred to as licensees and pay a royalty for each item sold bearing any related Olympic, USOPC or Team USA marks.

== Media coverage ==
NBCUniversal has held the American broadcasting rights of the Summer Olympics since 1988, and the broadcasting rights of the Winter Olympics since 2002. In 2011, NBC agreed to a $4.38 billion contract with the International Olympic Committee to broadcast the 2014, 2016, 2018, and 2020 Games. On May 7, 2014, NBC agreed to a $7.75 billion contract with the IOC to broadcast the 2022, 2024, 2026, 2028, 2030, and 2032 Games. As such, NBC Olympics is the IOC's, and by extension the Olympic movement's, highest revenue stream. The IOC distributes Olympic broadcast revenue through Olympic Solidarity – the body responsible for managing and administering the share of the television rights of the Olympic Games. Under the current format, the revenue is allocated to the NOCs – including the USOPC – the local organizing committee and International Federations.

In 2009, the USOPC and Comcast announced plans for The U.S. Olympic Network, which would have aired Olympic-sports events, news, and classic footage. However, the USOPC met opposition from the International Olympic Committee, which preferred to deal with NBCU (and its then-new Universal Sports joint venture). Later, Comcast purchased NBCUniversal, and eventually Universal Sports was discontinued, with interim programming agreements to air events on NBCSN and Universal HD made. On July 1, 2017, NBCUniversal launched the Olympic Channel on the former channel space of Universal HD; the USOPC is a partial operating partner in the network with the NBC Sports Group and it contains archived content from the USOPC.

== Relationship between IOC and USOPC ==
In May 2012, USOPC's leaders negotiated a resolution with the IOC, addressing a decades-long revenue sharing debate and paving the way for a peaceful future between the two bodies. The new agreement elevates the USOPC's global perception and restructures how worldwide Olympic sponsorship and U.S. TV revenues are shared, while providing for USOPC contributions to Olympic Games costs.

The agreement, revising 27-year-old terms governing the USOPC's shares of worldwide Olympic sponsorship and U.S. broadcast rights revenue, preserves the USOPC's future revenue at current levels and includes an escalator for inflation. Under the terms of the new agreement, the USOPC is guaranteed seven percent of the U.S. broadcast revenue and 10 percent of the IOC's global sponsorship revenue. The agreement guarantees the USOPC approximately $410 million per quadrennium, plus inflation and a percentage of revenue from new growth areas, beginning in 2020.

== See also ==
- United States Olympic & Paralympic Museum
- United States Center for SafeSport
- United States at the Olympics
- United States at the Paralympics
- United States at the Pan American Games
- United States national team
