= Marty Mankamyer =

President of the United States Olympic Committee
- In office August 15, 2002 – February 4, 2003

Personal details
- Born: 1933 of 1934 (age 91–92) Farmington, New Mexico

Marty Mankamyer (born 1933 or 1934) is the former president of the United States Olympic Committee from 2002 to 2003 and the first female board member of the United States Soccer Federation.

== Early life and education ==
Mankamyer was born in the 1930s and raised in Farmington, New Mexico. She went to the University of New Mexico for a couple of years before moving to UCLA and withdrawing from college.

== Career ==
In 1984, Mankamyer became the chair of the United States Youth Soccer Association. In 1990, Mankamyer joined the United States Olympic Committee and became the first woman on the United States Soccer Federation's board. As a soccer supervisor, she was part of the 1995 Pan American Games and the 1996 Summer Olympics. Mankamyer was also an assistant head of mission at the 2000 Summer Olympics. During her career at the USOC, Mankamyer started as a secretary in 2000. She was named USOC's interim president in May 2002 after Sandra Baldwin resigned. Mankamyer was officially elected as USOC's president in August 2002.

In January 2003, Mankamyer was accused of withholding information during an internal investigation by the USOC against CEO Lloyd Ward. A month later, Mankamyer resigned as president of the USOC after it was revealed she coerced Ward's realtor to pay her a finding fee. Following her resignation, Mankamyer continued her athletic career as she was selected to become a lifetime member of the United States Soccer Federation in 2006 and director of USA Taekwondo in 2008.

== Personal life ==
Mankamyer is married to her third husband Jack. They have seven children together.
