= USA Archery =

Governing body for the sport of archery in the United States

- Sport: Archery
- Founded: 1879
- Affiliation: World Archery
- Headquarters: Colorado Springs, Colorado
- Chairman: Jonathan Herpy

Official website
- www.usarchery.org
- (United States)

USA Archery (officially the National Archery Association Of The United States) is the governing body for the sport of archery in the United States and is recognized as the official governing body for archery in the United States by the International Olympic Committee.

== History ==
USA Archery was founded in 1879 as the National Archery Association to "foster and promote the sport of archery" in the United States. It became the governing organization of the US Archery Team after its founding 1982. The organization administers national teams for the Olympics and international competitions, as well as a collegiate archery program. To facilitate grassroots talent, the organization began an Athlete Development Model to facilitate archery training.

== Governance ==
USA Archery is governed by a 13-person board of directors who hold three-year terms. The current chair of the board of directors is Jonathan Herpy.
