= 2024 Summer Olympics =

Multi-sport event in Paris, France

Games of the XXXIII Olympiad
- Emblem of the 2024 Summer Olympics
- Location: Paris, France
- Motto: Games Wide Open (French: Ouvrons Grand les Jeux)
- Nations: 206 (including the AIN and EOR teams)
- Athletes: 10,714
- Events: 329 in 32 sports (48 disciplines)
- Opening: 26 July 2024
- Closing: 11 August 2024
- Opened by: President Emmanuel Macron
- Closed by: IOC President Thomas Bach
- Cauldron: Teddy Riner and Marie-José Pérec
- Venue: Jardins du Trocadéro and the Seine (Opening ceremony); Stade de France (Closing ceremony)

The 2024 Summer Olympics (French: Les Jeux Olympiques d'été de 2024), officially the Games of the XXXIII Olympiad (French: Jeux de la XXXIIIe olympiade de l'ère moderne) and branded as Paris 2024, were an international multi-sport event held in France from 26 July to 11 August 2024, with several events starting from 24 July. Paris was the host city, with events (mainly football) held in 16 additional cities in metropolitan France, including the sailing centre in the second-largest city of France, Marseille, on the Mediterranean Sea, as well as one subsite for surfing in Tahiti, French Polynesia.

Paris was awarded the Games at the 131st IOC Session in Lima, Peru, on 13 September 2017. After multiple withdrawals that left only Paris and Los Angeles in contention, the International Olympic Committee (IOC) approved a process to concurrently award the 2024 and 2028 Summer Olympics to the two remaining candidate cities. Having previously hosted in 1900 and 1924, Paris became the second city ever to host the Summer Olympics three times, after London (1908, 1948, and 2012). Paris 2024 marked the centennial of the 1924 Summer Games and the 1924 Winter Olympics in Chamonix (the first Winter Olympics), as well as the sixth Olympic Games hosted by France (three Summer Olympics and three Winter Olympics). The Summer Games returned to the traditional four-year Olympiad cycle, after the 2020 edition was postponed to 2021 due to the COVID-19 pandemic.

Paris 2024 featured the debut of breaking as an Olympic sport, and was the final Olympic Games held during the IOC presidency of Thomas Bach. The 2024 Games were expected to cost €9 billion. The opening ceremony was held outside of a stadium for the first time in modern Olympic history, being outdoors in the Paris's downtown and athletes were paraded by boat along the Seine. Paris 2024 was the first Olympics in history to reach full gender parity on the field of play, with equal numbers of male and female athletes.

The United States topped the medal table for the fourth consecutive Summer Games and 19th time overall, with 40 gold and 126 total medals. China tied with the United States on gold (40), but finished second due to having fewer silvers; the nation won 91 medals overall. This was the first time a gold medal tie had occurred between the two most successful nations in Summer Olympic history. Japan finished third with 20 gold and 45 total medals, and sixth in the overall medal count. Australia finished fourth with 18 gold and 53 total medals, marking the nation's most successful Summer Olympics of all time, and fifth in the overall medal count. The host nation, France, finished fifth with 16 gold and 64 total medals, marking their first top-five finish since the 1996 Summer Olympics, and fourth in the overall medal count. Dominica, Saint Lucia, Cape Verde and Albania won their first-ever Olympic medals, the former two both being gold, with Botswana and Guatemala also winning their first-ever gold medals. The Refugee Olympic Team also won their first-ever medal: Cindy Ngamba, a refugee from Cameroon, won a bronze in boxing.

Despite some controversies throughout relating to politics, logistics and conditions in the Olympic Village, the Games were considered a success by the press, Parisians and observers upon its conclusion. (Note: Sources: "'Pure Hollywood,' Paris 'wins a gold medal': Foreign press leaves glowing reviews for 2024 Olympics". Le Monde. 12 August 2024.; Porter, Catherine (11 August 2024). "Paris, Uncharacteristically Giddy, Bids Au Revoir to the Olympics". The New York Times. ISSN 0362-4331.; Leicester, John (11 August 2024). "Paris and the Olympics have changed each other during their summer fling". AP News.; Noack, Rick (12 August 2024). "The risky bets of the Paris Olympics paid off. Who can claim the win?". Washington Post. ISSN 0190-8286.) The Paris Olympics broke all-time records for ticket sales, with more than 9.5 million tickets sold (12.1 million including the Paralympic Games).

== Host selection ==
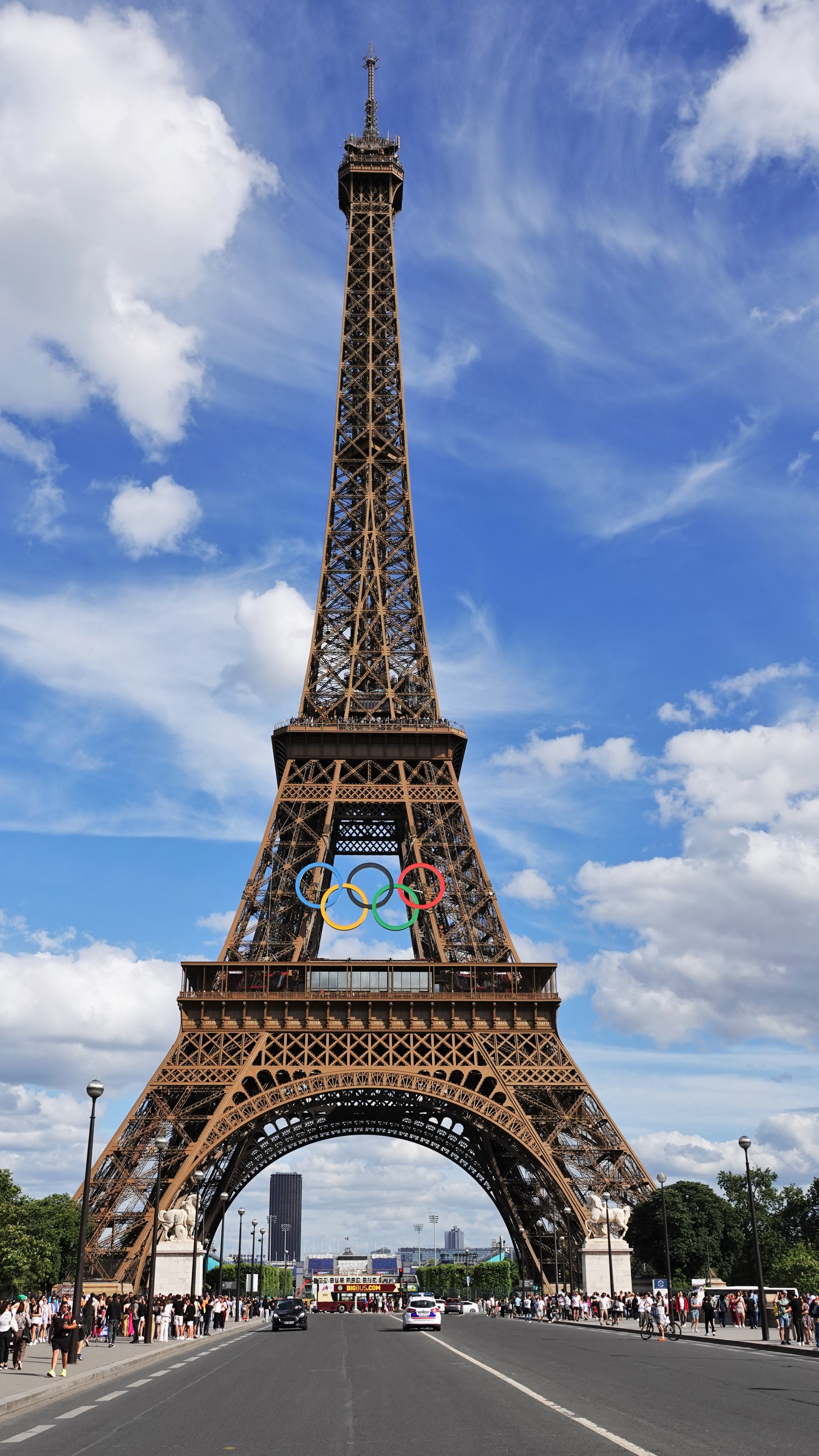
The Olympic rings on the Eiffel Tower during the Games

Having previously hosted the 1900 and 1924 Games, Paris did not attempt to host the Olympics again until it bid, unsuccessfully, for the 1992 Games which were awarded to Barcelona. Subsequent bids for the 2008 and 2012 Games were also unsuccessful, as they were awarded to Beijing and London, respectively. Undeterred, Paris decided to bid once more for the 2024 edition, which would mark the centenary of its last Games.

The six candidate cities were Paris, Hamburg, Boston, Budapest, Rome, and Los Angeles. The bidding process was slowed by withdrawals, political uncertainty, and rising costs. Boston surpassed Los Angeles, San Francisco, and Washington, D.C., for the official U.S. bid. On 27 July 2015, Boston and the USOC mutually agreed to terminate Boston's bid to host the Games, partly because of mixed feelings among city residents. Hamburg withdrew its bid on 29 November 2015 after holding a referendum. Rome withdrew on 21 September 2016, citing fiscal difficulties. Budapest withdrew on 22 February 2017, after a petition against the bid collected more signatures than necessary for a referendum.

Following these withdrawals, the IOC Executive Board met on 9 June 2017 in Lausanne, Switzerland, to discuss the 2024 and 2028 bid processes. The International Olympic Committee formally proposed electing the 2024 and 2028 Olympic host cities at the same time, a proposal which an Extraordinary IOC Session approved on 11 July 2017 in Lausanne. The IOC set up a process whereby the LA 2024 and Paris 2024 bid committees met with the IOC to discuss which city would host the Games in 2024 and 2028 and whether it was possible to select the host cities for both at the same time.

Following the decision to award the two Games simultaneously, Paris was understood to be the preferred host for 2024. On 31 July 2017, the IOC announced Los Angeles as the sole candidate for 2028, enabling Paris to be confirmed as host for 2024. The two bids were praised for their high technical plans and innovative ways to use a record-breaking number of existing and temporary facilities. Both decisions were ratified at the 131st IOC Session on 13 September 2017.

=== Host city election ===
Paris was elected as the host city on 13 September 2017 at the 131st IOC Session in Lima, Peru. The two French IOC members, Guy Drut and Tony Estanguet, were ineligible to vote under the rules of the Olympic Charter.

2024 Summer Olympics bidding results
City	Country	Vote
Paris	France	Selected as 2024 host
Los Angeles	United States	Selected as 2028 host
Hamburg	Germany	Withdrew
Rome	Italy	Withdrew
Budapest	Hungary	Withdrew

== Development and preparations ==
=== Venues ===
Facilities in the Paris area. Navigate the map for other facilities.

Most of the Olympic events were held in the city of Paris and its metropolitan region, including the neighbouring cities of Saint-Denis, Le Bourget, Nanterre, Versailles, and Vaires-sur-Marne.

The basketball preliminaries and handball finals were held in Lille, 225 km (140 mi) from the host city, Paris; the sailing and some of the football games were held in the Mediterranean city of Marseille, which is 777 km (483 mi) from Paris; meanwhile, the surfing events were held in Teahupo'o village in the overseas territory of Tahiti, French Polynesia, which is 15,716 km (9,765 mi) from Paris. Football was also hosted in an additional five cities: Bordeaux, Décines-Charpieu (Lyon), Nantes, Nice and Saint-Étienne, some of which are home to Ligue 1 clubs.

==== Grand Paris zone ====
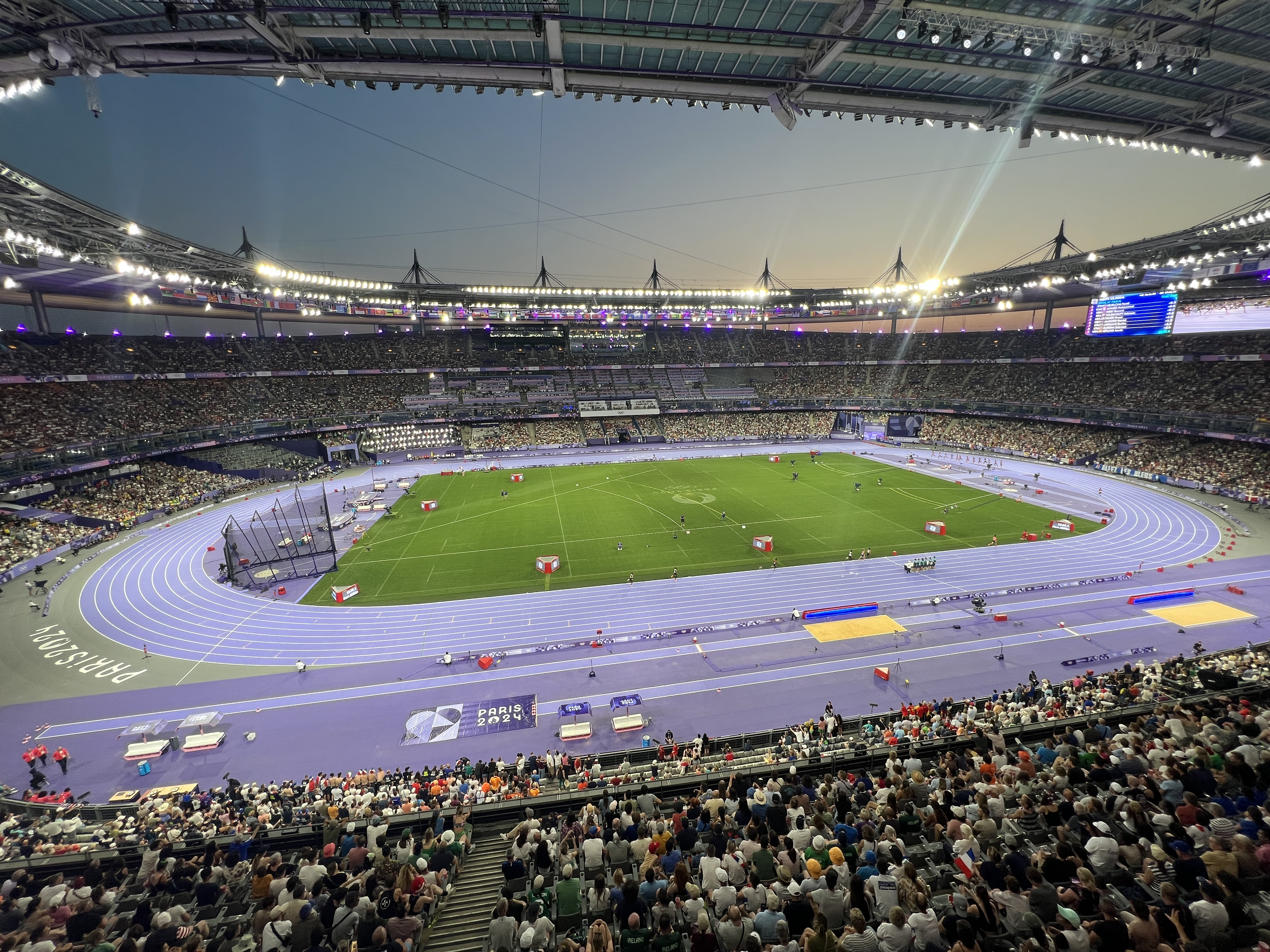
Stade de France

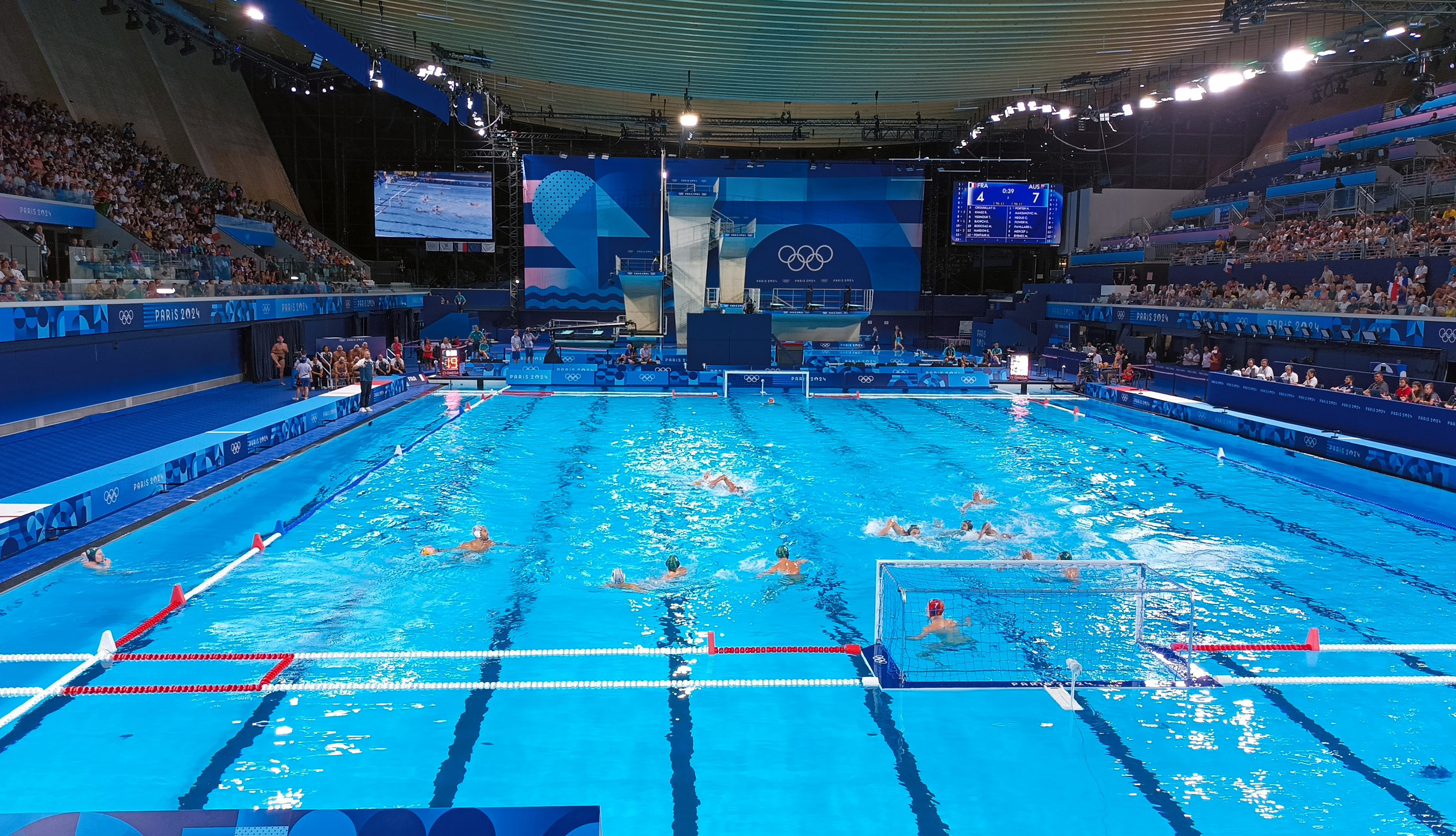
Paris Aquatic Centre

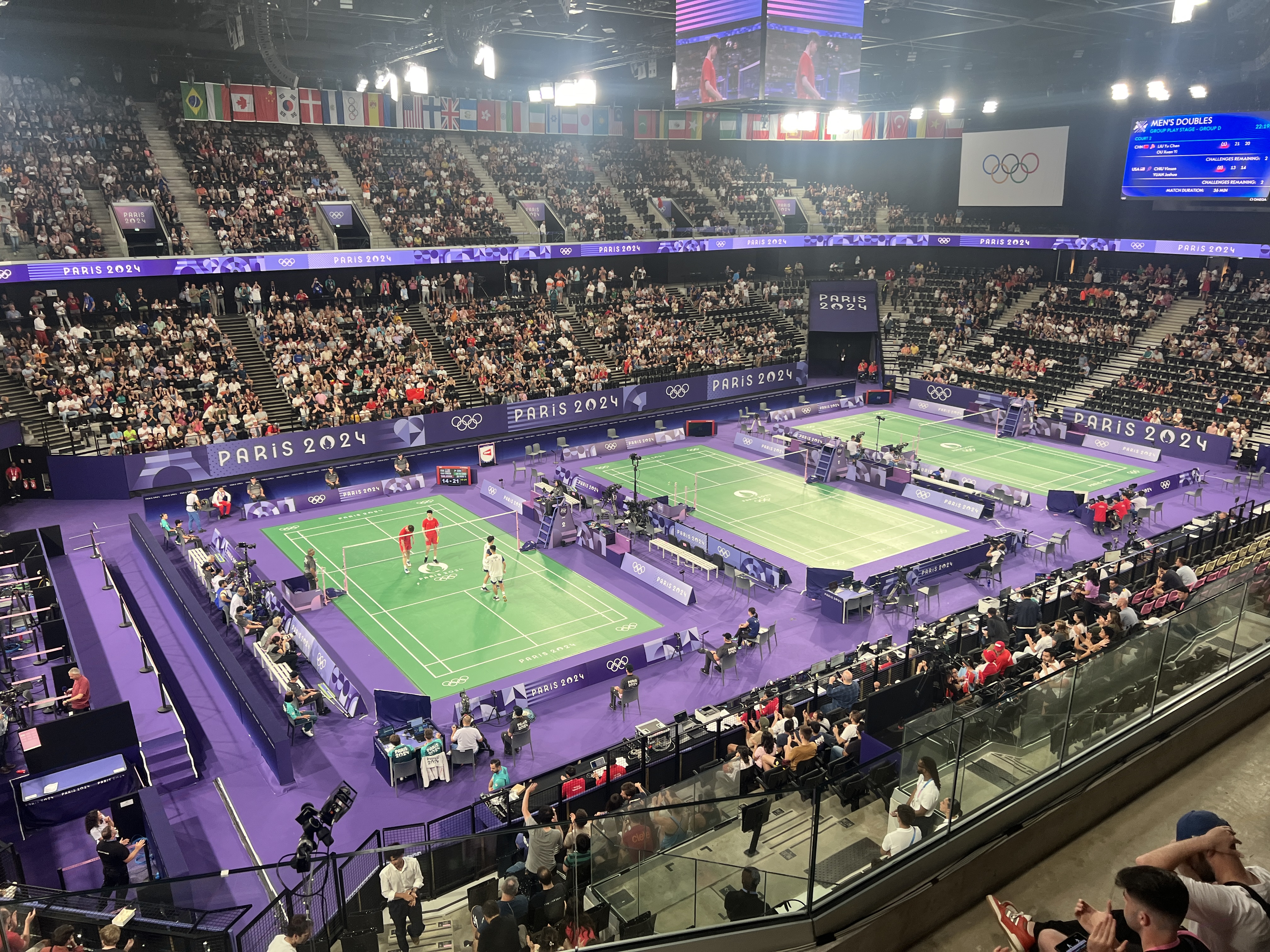
Porte de La Chapelle Arena

Venue	Events	Capacity	Status	Ref.
Yves du Manoir Stadium	Field hockey	15,000	Existing, renovated	
Stade de France	Rugby sevens	77,083	Existing	
Stade de France	Athletics (track and field)	77,083	Existing	
Stade de France	Closing ceremony	77,083	Existing	
Paris La Défense Arena	Aquatics (swimming, water polo finals)	15,220	Existing with temporary stands	
Porte de La Chapelle Arena	Badminton	8,000	Built for the Games	
Porte de La Chapelle Arena	Gymnastics (rhythmic)	8,000	Built for the Games	
Paris Aquatic Centre	Aquatics (water polo preliminaries, diving, artistic swimming)	5,000	Built for the Games	
Le Bourget Climbing Venue	Sport climbing	5,000	Temporary	
Arena Paris Nord	Boxing (preliminaries, quarter-finals)	6,000	Existing with temporary stands	
Arena Paris Nord	Modern pentathlon (fencing)	6,000	Existing with temporary stands	

==== Paris Centre zone ====
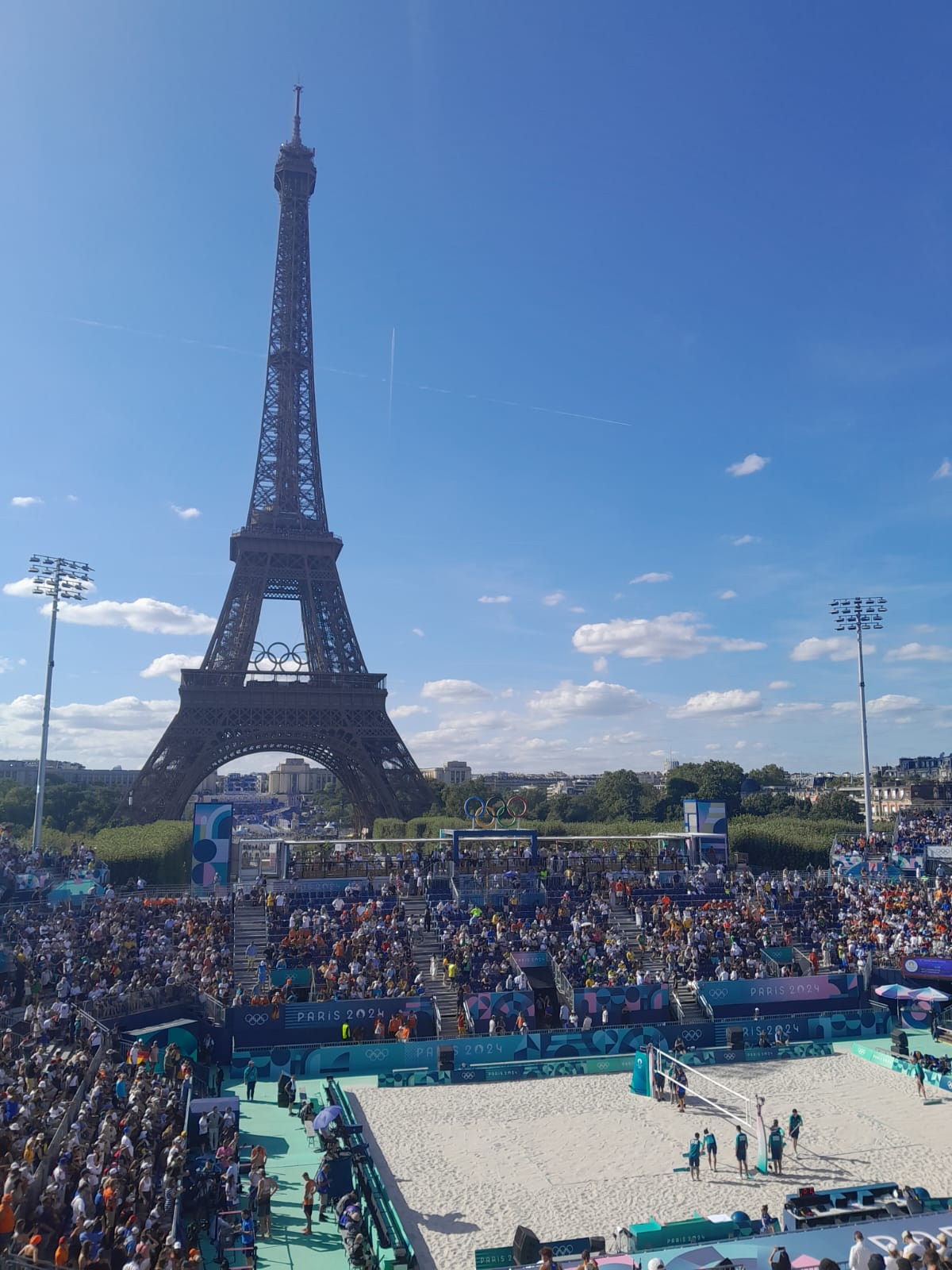
Eiffel Tower stadium, Champ de Mars

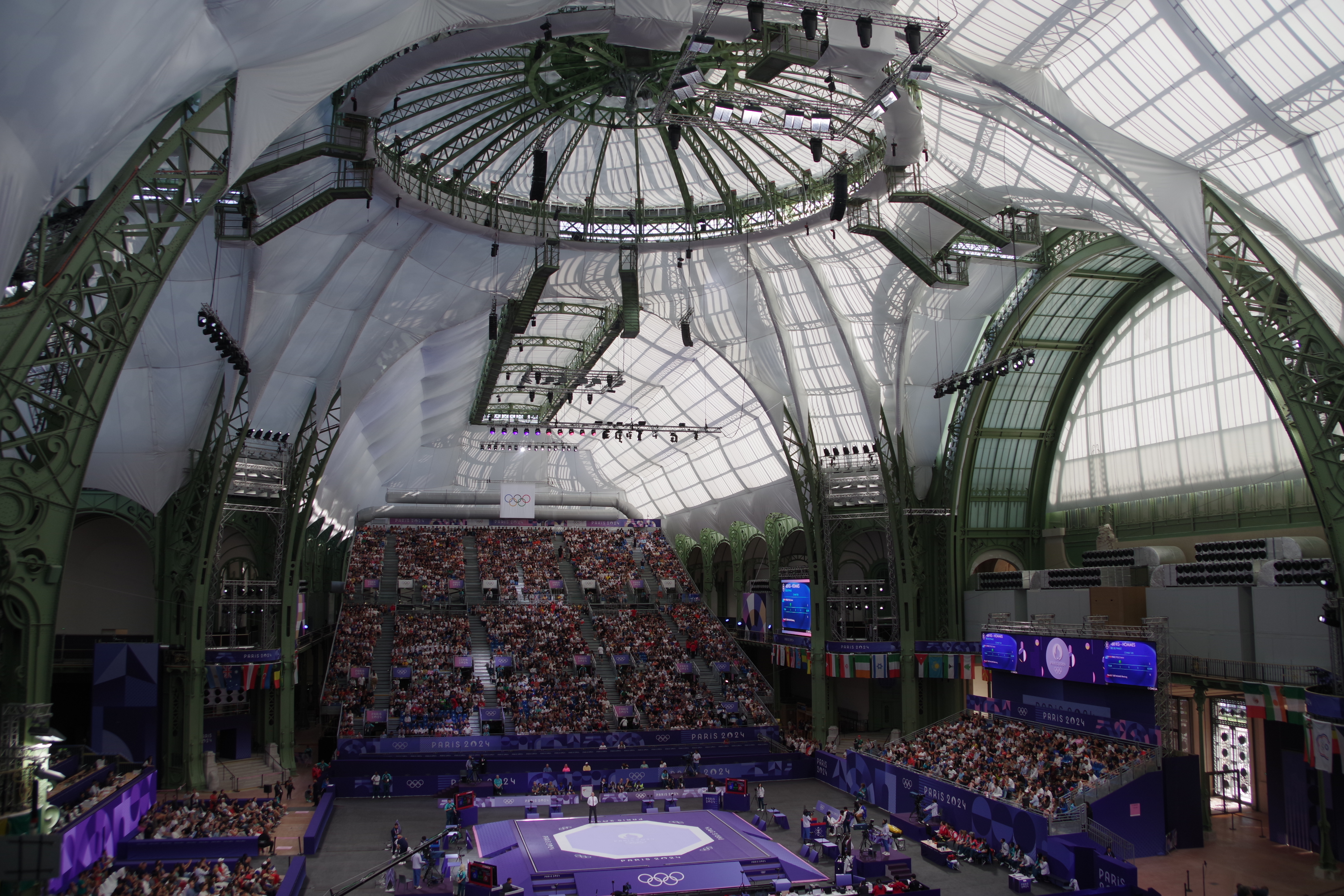
Grand Palais

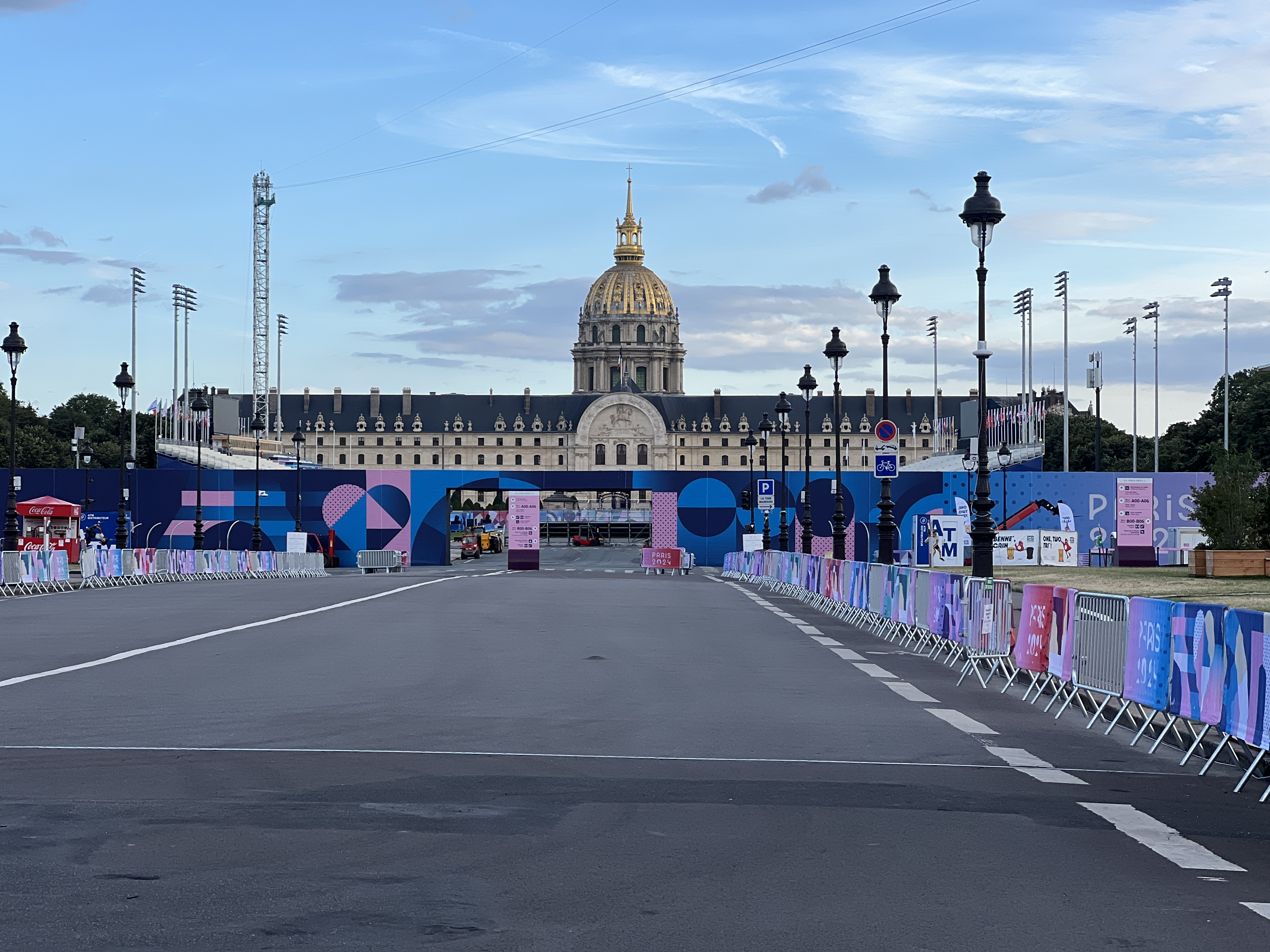
Les Invalides

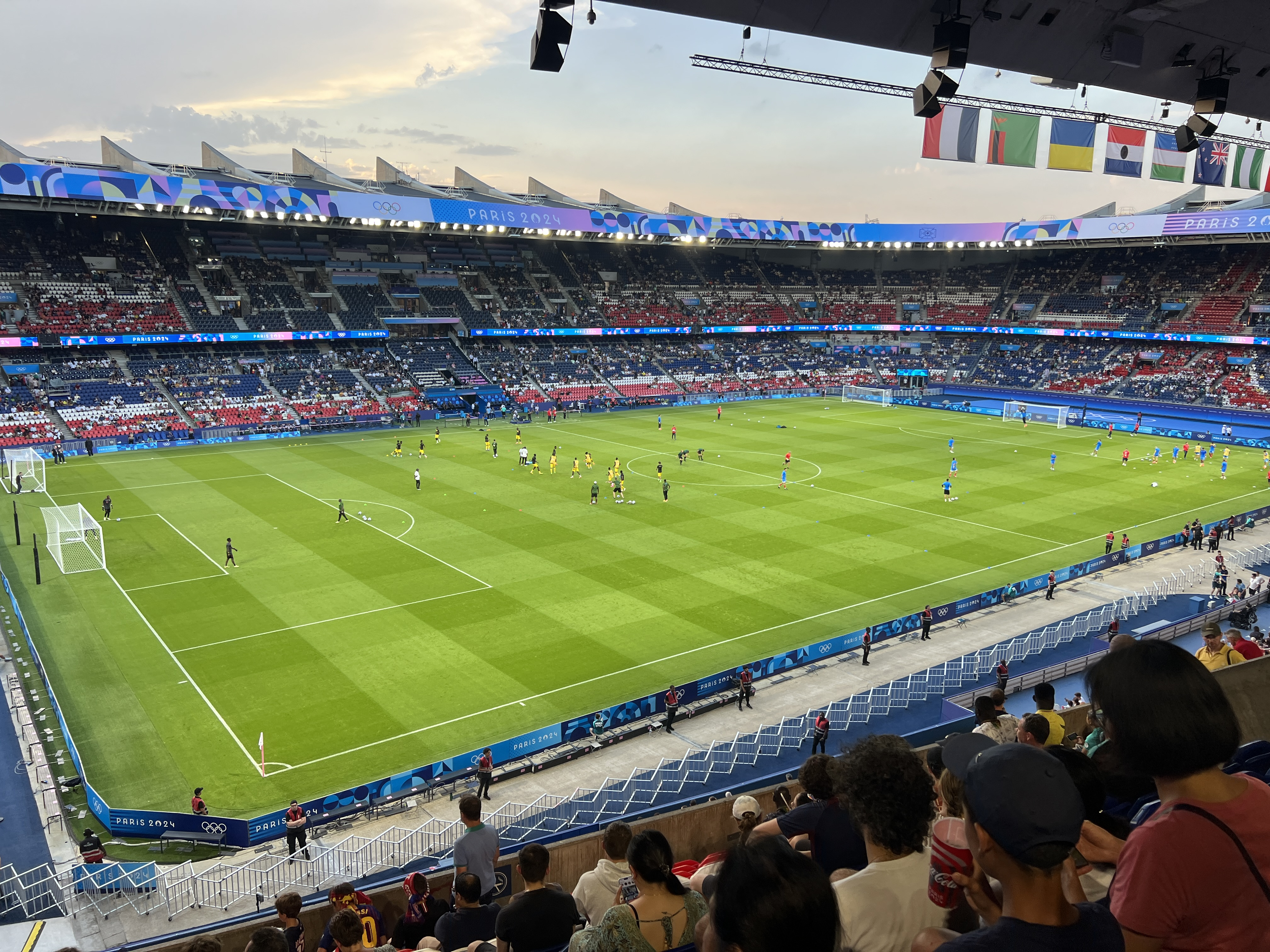
Parc des Princes

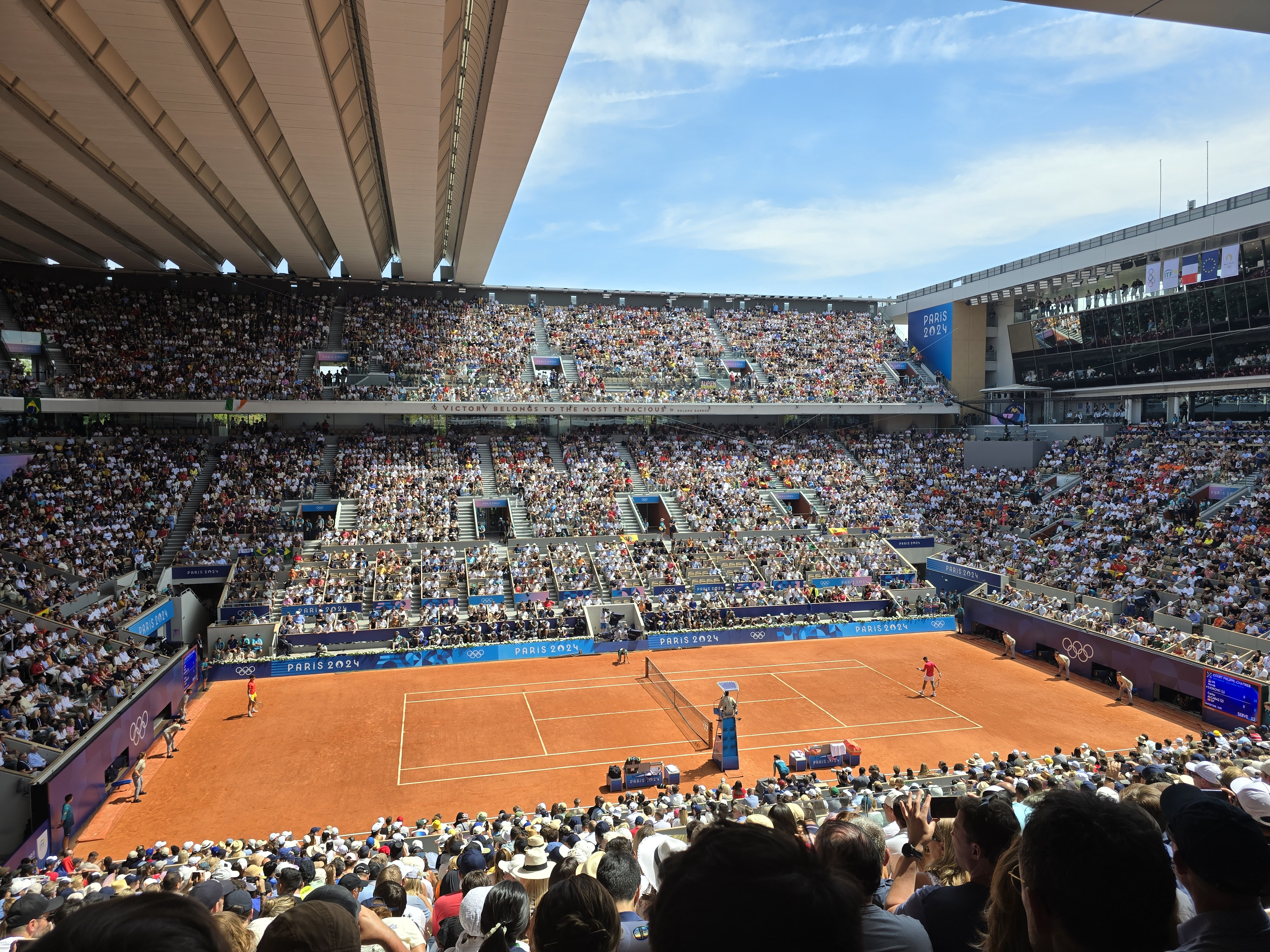
Stade Roland Garros

Venue	Events	Capacity	Status
Parc des Princes	Football (group stage, quarter-finals and gold medal matches)	48,583	Existing
Stade Roland Garros	Tennis	36,000 (15,000 + 12,000 + 9,000)	Existing
Stade Roland Garros	Boxing (finals)	36,000 (15,000 + 12,000 + 9,000)	Existing
Paris Expo Porte de Versailles	Volleyball	18,000 (12,000 + 12,000)	Existing
Paris Expo Porte de Versailles	Table tennis	18,000 (12,000 + 12,000)	Existing
Paris Expo Porte de Versailles	Handball (preliminaries)	18,000 (12,000 + 12,000)	Existing
Paris Expo Porte de Versailles	Weightlifting	18,000 (12,000 + 12,000)	Existing
Bercy Arena	Gymnastics (artistic and trampolining)	15,000	Existing
Bercy Arena	Basketball (finals)	15,000	Existing
Grand Palais	Fencing	8,000	Existing with temporary stands
Grand Palais	Taekwondo	8,000	Existing with temporary stands
Place de la Concorde	Basketball (3x3)	30,000 (overall)	Temporary
Place de la Concorde	Breaking	30,000 (overall)	Temporary
Place de la Concorde	Cycling (BMX freestyle)	30,000 (overall)	Temporary
Place de la Concorde	Skateboarding	30,000 (overall)	Temporary
Hôtel de Ville	Athletics (marathon start)	1,500	Temporary
Pont Alexandre III	Aquatics (marathon swimming)	1,500	Temporary
Pont Alexandre III	Triathlon	1,500	Temporary
Pont Alexandre III	Cycling (time trial finish)	1,500	Temporary
Trocadéro (Pont d'Iéna)	Athletics (race walk)	13,000 (3,000 sitting)	Temporary
Trocadéro (Pont d'Iéna)	Cycling (road race)	13,000 (3,000 sitting)	Temporary
Eiffel Tower Stadium (Champ de Mars)	Beach volleyball	12,000	Temporary
Grand Palais Éphémère	Judo	9,000	Temporary
Grand Palais Éphémère	Wrestling	9,000	Temporary
Les Invalides	Archery	8,000	Temporary
Les Invalides	Athletics (marathon finish)	8,000	Temporary
Les Invalides	Cycling (time trial start)	8,000	Temporary

==== Versailles zone ====
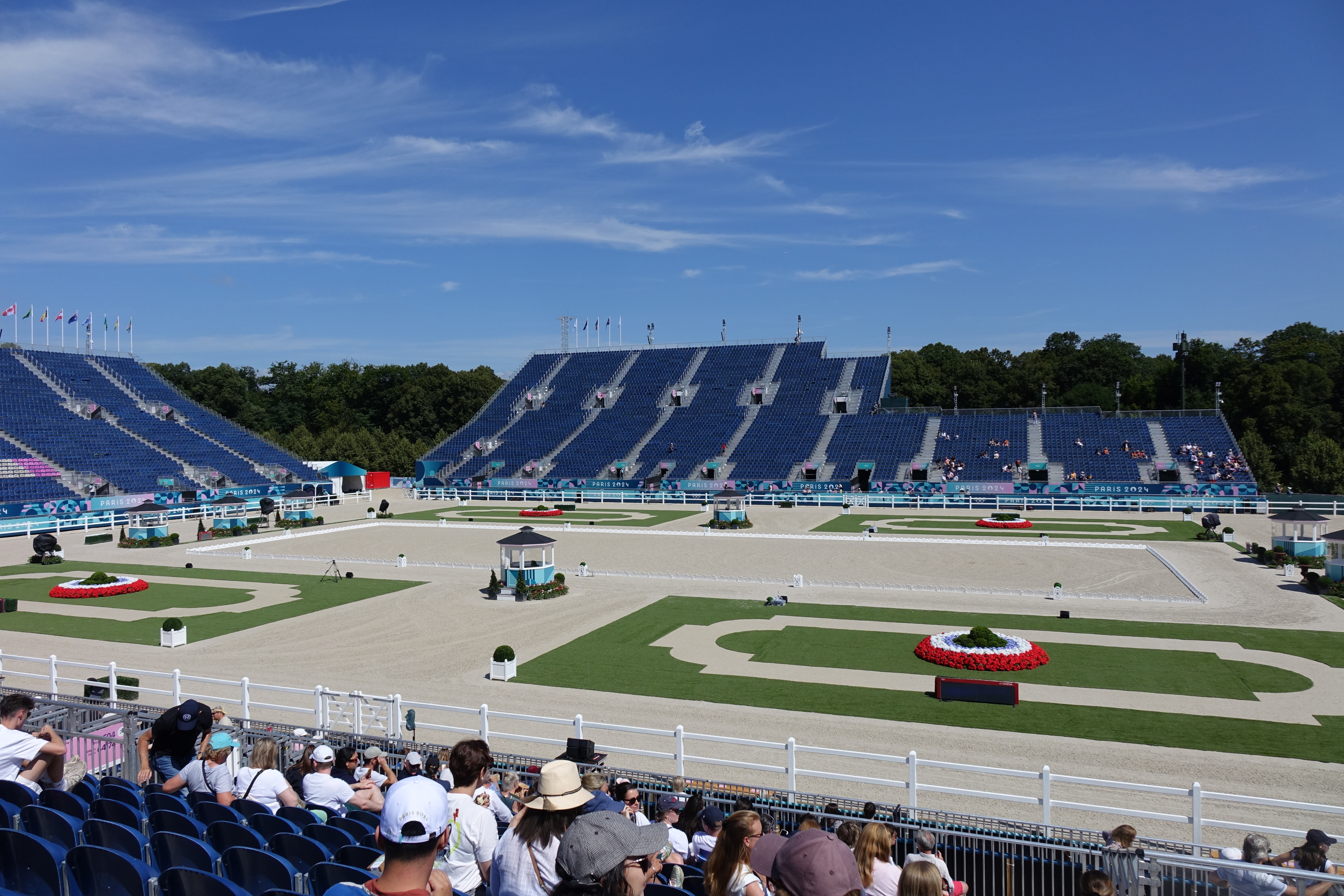
Gardens of Versailles

Venue	Events	Capacity	Status
Gardens of Versailles	Equestrian	80,000 (22,000 + 58,000)	Temporary
Gardens of Versailles	Modern pentathlon (excluding fencing rounds)	80,000 (22,000 + 58,000)	Temporary
Le Golf National	Golf	35,000	Existing with temporary stands
Élancourt Hill	Cycling (mountain biking)	25,000	Existing with temporary stands
Vélodrome de Saint-Quentin-en-Yvelines	Cycling (track)	5,000	Existing
Vélodrome de Saint-Quentin-en-Yvelines	Cycling (BMX racing)	5,000	Existing with temporary stands

==== Outlying venues ====
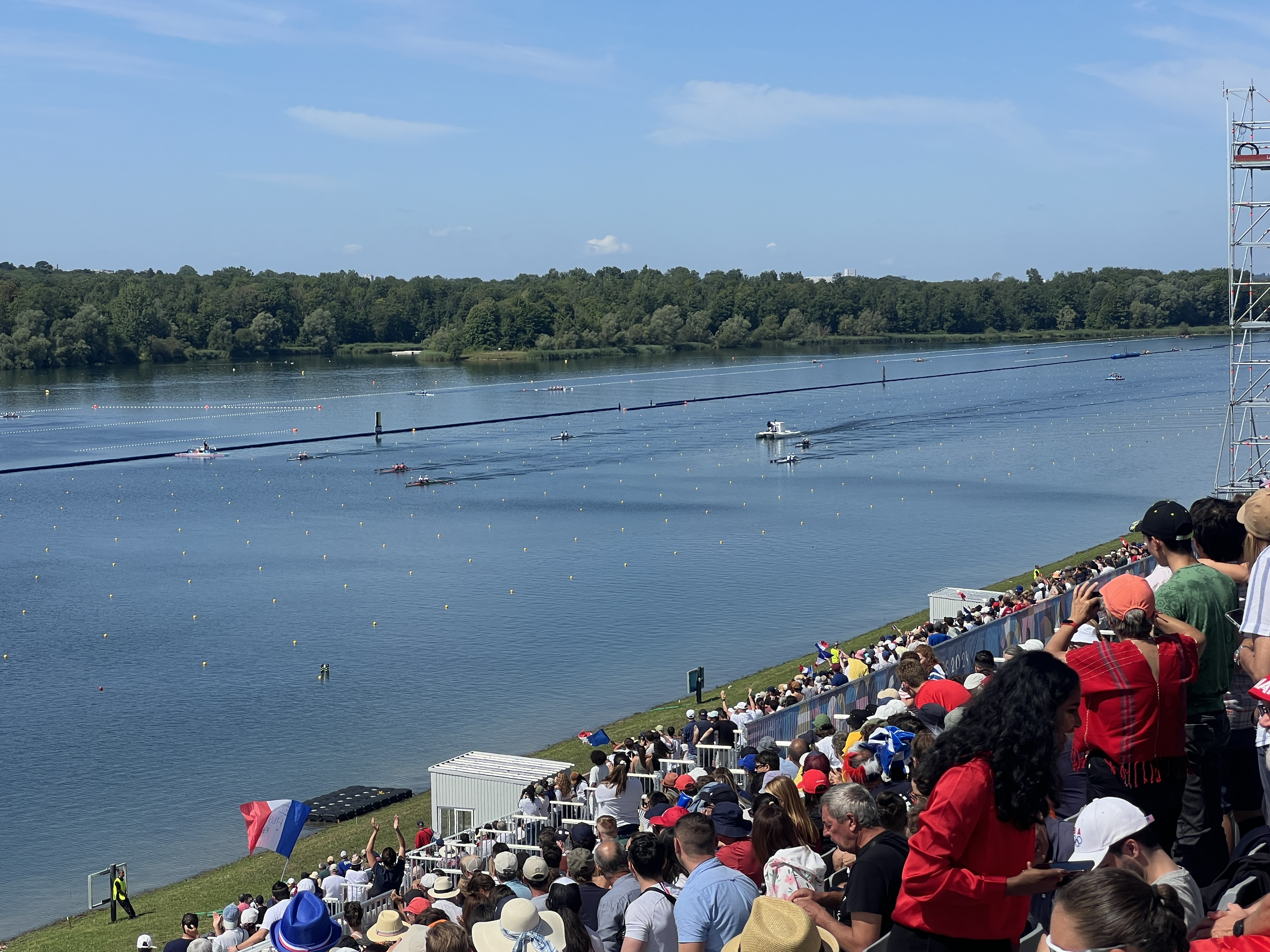
Vaires-sur-Marne Nautical Stadium

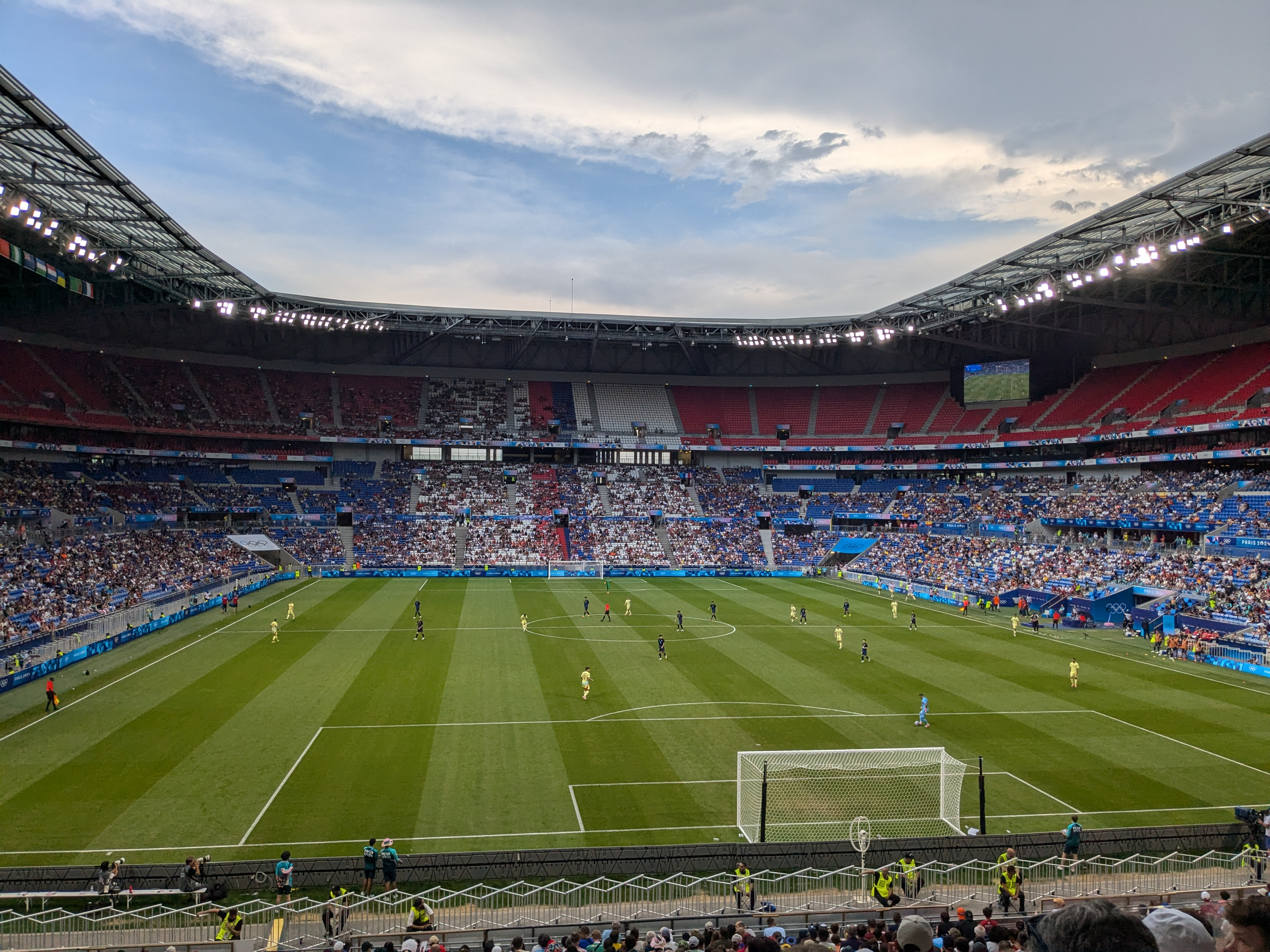
Parc Olympique Lyonnais

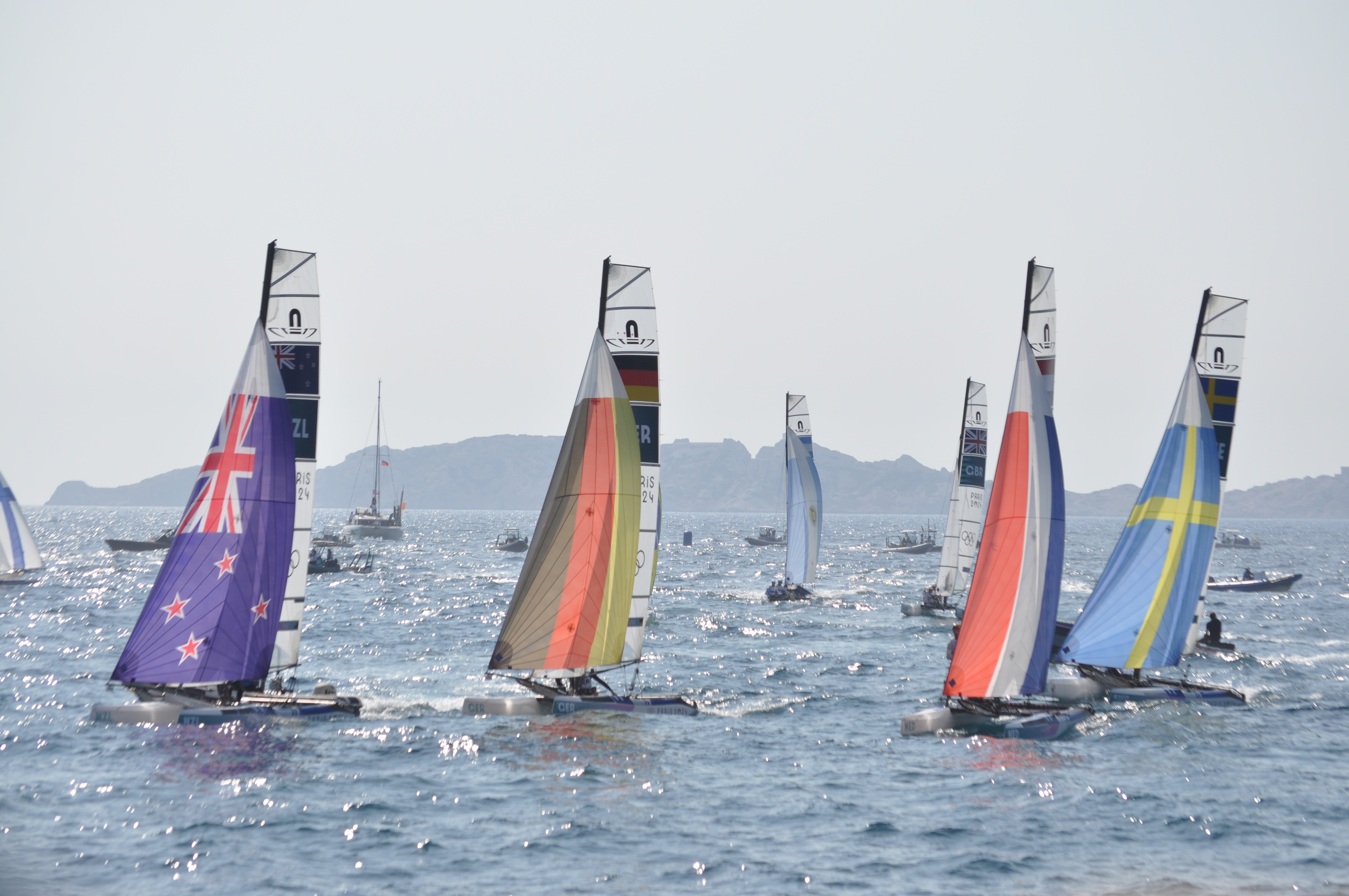
Roucas Blanc Olympic Marina, Marseille

Venue	Events	Capacity	Status
Vaires-sur-Marne Nautical Stadium	Rowing	24,000 (overall)	Existing with temporary stands
Vaires-sur-Marne Nautical Stadium	Canoeing (slalom, sprint)	24,000 (overall)	Existing with temporary stands
Pierre Mauroy Stadium, Lille	Basketball (group stage)	26,000	Existing with temporary stands
Pierre Mauroy Stadium, Lille	Handball (finals)	26,000	Existing with temporary stands
Stade Vélodrome, Marseille	Football (6 group stage matches, quarter-finals, women's and men's semi-finals)	67,394	Existing
Parc Olympique Lyonnais, Lyon	Football (6 group stage matches, quarter-finals, men's and women's semi-finals, women's bronze medal match)	59,186	Existing
Stade Matmut Atlantique, Bordeaux	Football (6 group stage matches, quarter-finals)	42,115	Existing
Stade Geoffroy-Guichard, Saint-Étienne	Football (6 group stage matches)	41,965	Existing
Allianz Riviera, Nice	Football (6 group stage matches)	35,624	Existing
Stade de la Beaujoire, Nantes	Football (6 group stage matches, quarter-finals, men's bronze medal match)	35,322	Existing
National Shooting Centre, Châteauroux	Shooting	3,000	Existing
Roucas Blanc Olympic Marina, Marseille	Sailing	5,000	Existing with temporary stands
Teahupo'o, Tahiti	Surfing	5,000	Existing with temporary stands

==== Non-competitive ====
Venue	Events	Capacity	Status
Jardins du Trocadéro	Opening ceremony	30,000 / 13,000	Temporary
Jardins du Trocadéro	Champions Park	30,000 / 13,000	Temporary
The Seine	Opening ceremony	300,000	Temporary
Olympic Village	Olympic Village	18,000 athletes	Built for the Games
Aranui 5, Tahiti	Surfing Olympic Village	256 athletes	Existing
Parc de l'Aire des Vents, Dugny	Media Village	—N/a	Temporary
Le Bourget Exhibition Centre and Media Village, Le Bourget	International Broadcast Centre	15,000	Existing
Paris Congress Centre	Main Press Centre	—N/a	Existing

=== Medals ===
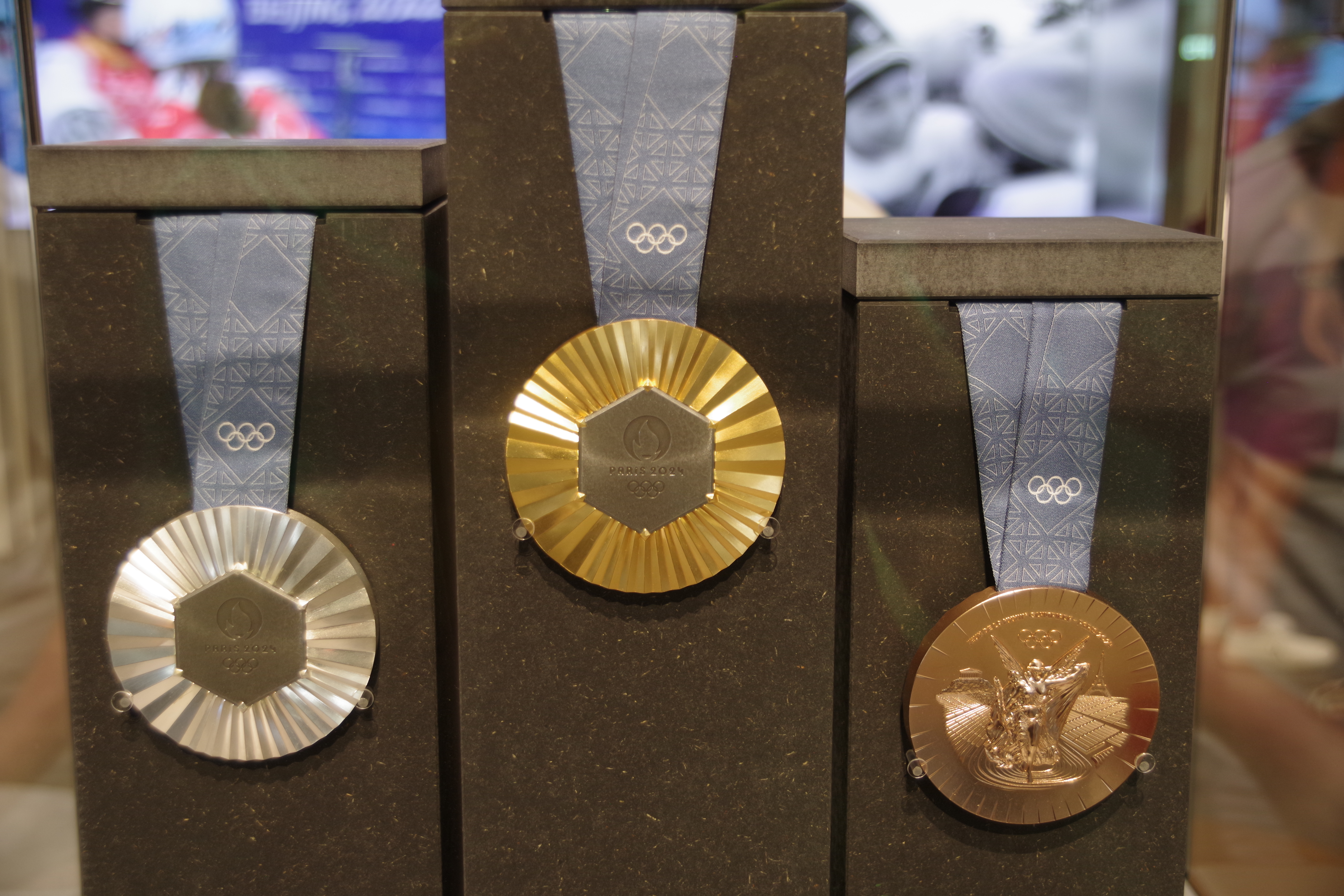
Medals from the Games, with a piece of the Eiffel Tower

The president of the Paris 2024 Olympic Organizing Committee, Tony Estanguet, unveiled the Olympic and Paralympic medals for the Games in February 2024, which on the obverse featured embedded hexagon-shaped tokens of scrap iron that had been taken from the original construction of the Eiffel Tower, with the logo of the Games engraved into it. Approximately 5,084 medals would be produced by the French mint Monnaie de Paris, and were designed by Chaumet, a luxury jewellery firm based in Paris.

The reverse of the medals features Nike, the Greek goddess of victory, inside the Panathenaic Stadium which hosted the first modern Olympics in 1896. Parthenon and the Eiffel Tower can also be seen in the background on both sides of the medal. Each medal weighs 455–529 g (16–19 oz), has a diameter of 85 mm (3.3 in) and is 9.2 mm (0.36 in) thick. The gold medals are made with 98.8 percent silver and 1.13 percent gold, while the bronze medals are made up with copper, zinc, and tin.

=== Podium ===
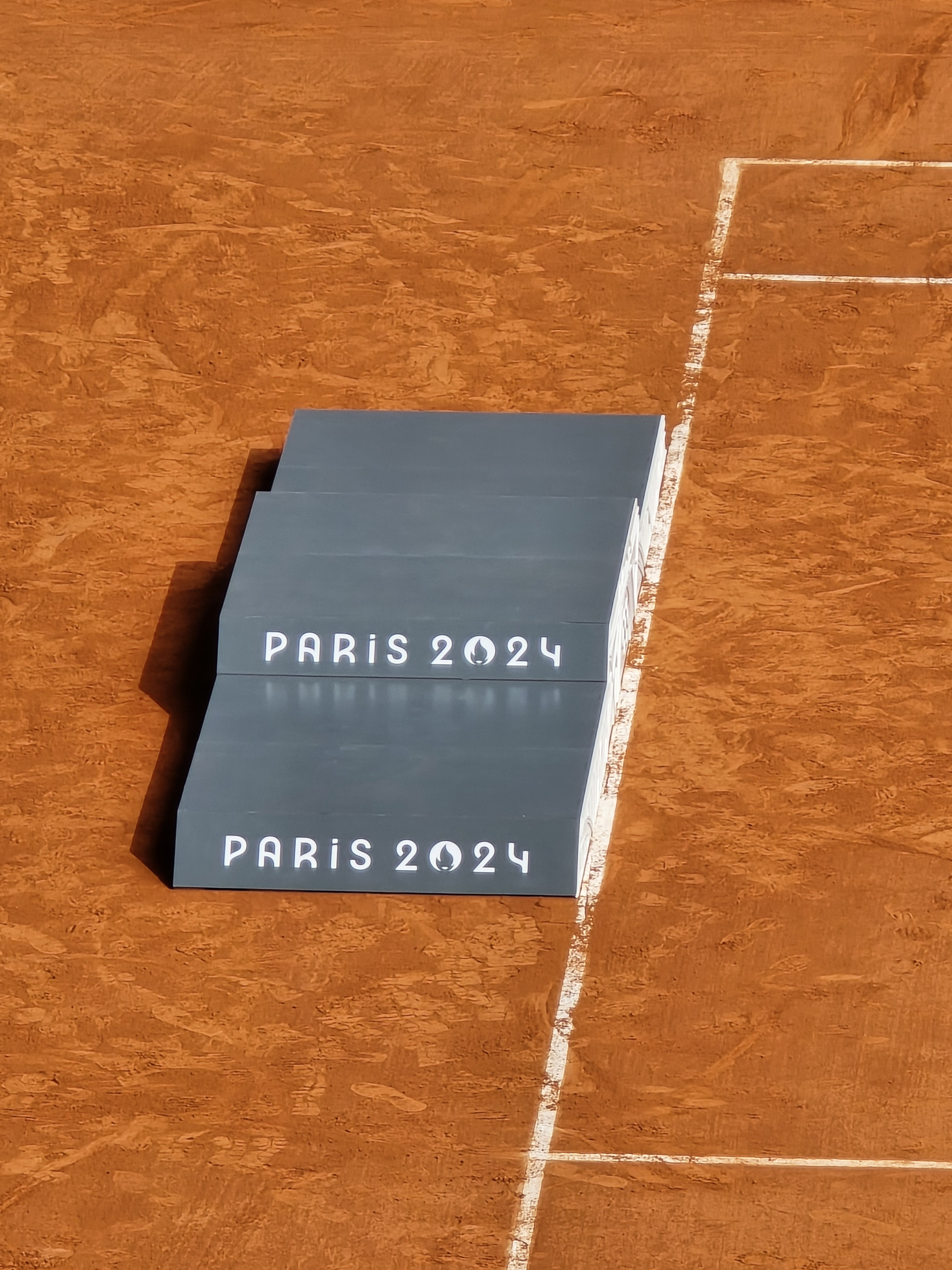
A 2024 Summer Olympics podium at the Stade Roland Garros

The podiums used at the 2024 games were ecological, manufactured in France by Le Pavé, Global Concept and Giffard, using French wood and 100% recycled plastic. They were painted in gray color as a homage to the roofs of Paris and were inspired by the design of the Eiffel Tower.

The podiums were composed of plastic modules that would be assembled according to the number of medalists awarded. The largest podium, for football, reached 33 meters in length. Podiums for individual events were 3.6 meters long. A total of 685 modules were manufactured using 18 tons of plastic waste.

The podiums were two-toned. The front was white with the Olympic rings and the Paralympic agitos. The top was gray to reflect the zinc of the Parisian rooftops. The inscription "Paris 2024" was on the sides of the steps. The Paralympic modules had ramps for accessibility.

=== Security ===
France reached an agreement with Europol and the UK Home Office to help strengthen security and "facilitate operational information exchange and international law enforcement cooperation" during the Games. The agreement included a plan to deploy more drones and sea barriers to prevent small boats from crossing the Channel illegally. The British Army would also provide support by deploying Starstreak surface-to-air missile units for air security. To prepare for the Games, the Paris police held inspections and rehearsals in their bomb disposal unit, similar to their preparations for the 2023 Rugby World Cup at the Stade de France.

As part of a visit to France by Qatari Emir Sheikh Tamim bin Hamad Al-Thani, several agreements were signed between the two nations to enhance security for the Summer Olympics. In preparation for the significant security demands and counterterrorism measures, Poland pledged to contribute security troops, including sniffer dog handlers, to support international efforts aimed at ensuring the safety of the Games. The Qatari Minister of Interior and Commander of Lekhwiya (the Qatari security forces) convened a meeting on 3 April 2024 to discuss security operations ahead of the Olympics, with officials and security leaders in attendance, including Nasser Al-Khelaifi and Sheikh Jassim bin Mansour Al Thani. A week before the opening ceremony, the Lekhwiya were reported to have been deployed in Paris on 16 July 2024.

In the weeks running up to the opening of the Olympics, it was reported that police officers would be deployed from Belgium, Brazil, Canada (through the RCMP/OPS/CPS/SQ), Cyprus, the Czech Republic, Denmark, Estonia, Finland, Germany (through Bundespolizei/NRW Police), India, Ireland, Italy, Luxembourg, Morocco, Netherlands, Norway, Poland, Portugal, Slovakia, South Korea, Spain (through the CNP/GC), Sweden, the UAE, the UK, and the United States (through the LAPD, LASD, NYPD, and the Fairfax County (Virginia) Police Department), with more than 40 countries providing police assistance to their French counterparts.

Security concerns impacted the plans that had been announced for the opening ceremony, which was to take place as a public event along the Seine; the expected attendance was reduced by half from an estimated 600,000 to 300,000, with plans for free viewing locations now being by invitation only. In April 2024, after Islamic State claimed responsibility for the Crocus City Hall attack in Russia and made several threats against the UEFA Champions League quarter-finals, French president Emmanuel Macron indicated that the opening ceremony could be scaled back or re-located if necessary. French authorities had placed roughly 75,000 police and military officials on the streets of Paris in the lead-up to the Games.

Following the end of the Games, the national counterterrorism prosecutor, Olivier Christen, revealed that French authorities foiled three terror plots meant to attack the Olympic and Paralympic Games, resulting in the arrest of five suspects.

=== Food ===
To reduce the environmental impact and climate footprint of the Games, the Olympic venues served twice as much plant-based food as was available in London in 2012 and Rio in 2016. Vegan chicken nuggets and vegan hot dogs were served in place of the meat-based varieties. Venues for spectators served on average two-thirds plant-based meals. The Place de la Concorde, the venue that hosted the skateboarding, breakdancing and BMX events, only served plant-based food. The football stadiums served 40% plant-based food. About 30% of the meals served to athletes in the Olympic Village were plant-based.

A prior estimate of 13 million meals were served during the Games, with around 40,000 meals served each day, 1,200 of which would be Michelin-starred. Each day, a boulangerie would bake fresh baguettes and other breads. A 3,500-seat restaurant was constructed for the Games to highlight global cuisine. Great Britain's team asked for porridge to be added to the menu, and South Korea's team asked for kimchi.

Throughout the Games, various athletes and competitors at the Olympic Village complained about certain foods served at the Village, such as eggs and grilled meats, not being available in sufficient quantity. Some countries also reportedly complained about raw meat being served, and the food issues led many of them to begin to avoid the Olympic Village dining facilities and to feed their athletes elsewhere; for example, the British Olympic Association flew in designated chefs to take care of the nourishment of British athletes at a location outside the Olympic Village.

=== Air conditioning ===
In the lead-up to the Games, it was announced that the Olympic Village would lack air conditioning; as an environmental measure, the buildings would instead use a geothermal natural cooling system to keep the inside temperature 6 °C (11 °F) cooler than outside. On learning this, many teams opted to supply their own air-conditioning units to the Games, including Canada, Great Britain, Italy, Germany, Greece, Denmark, Japan, and the US. Olympic delegations from poorer countries, such as Uganda, complained that they could not afford to provide air conditioning for their athletes.

=== Transportation ===
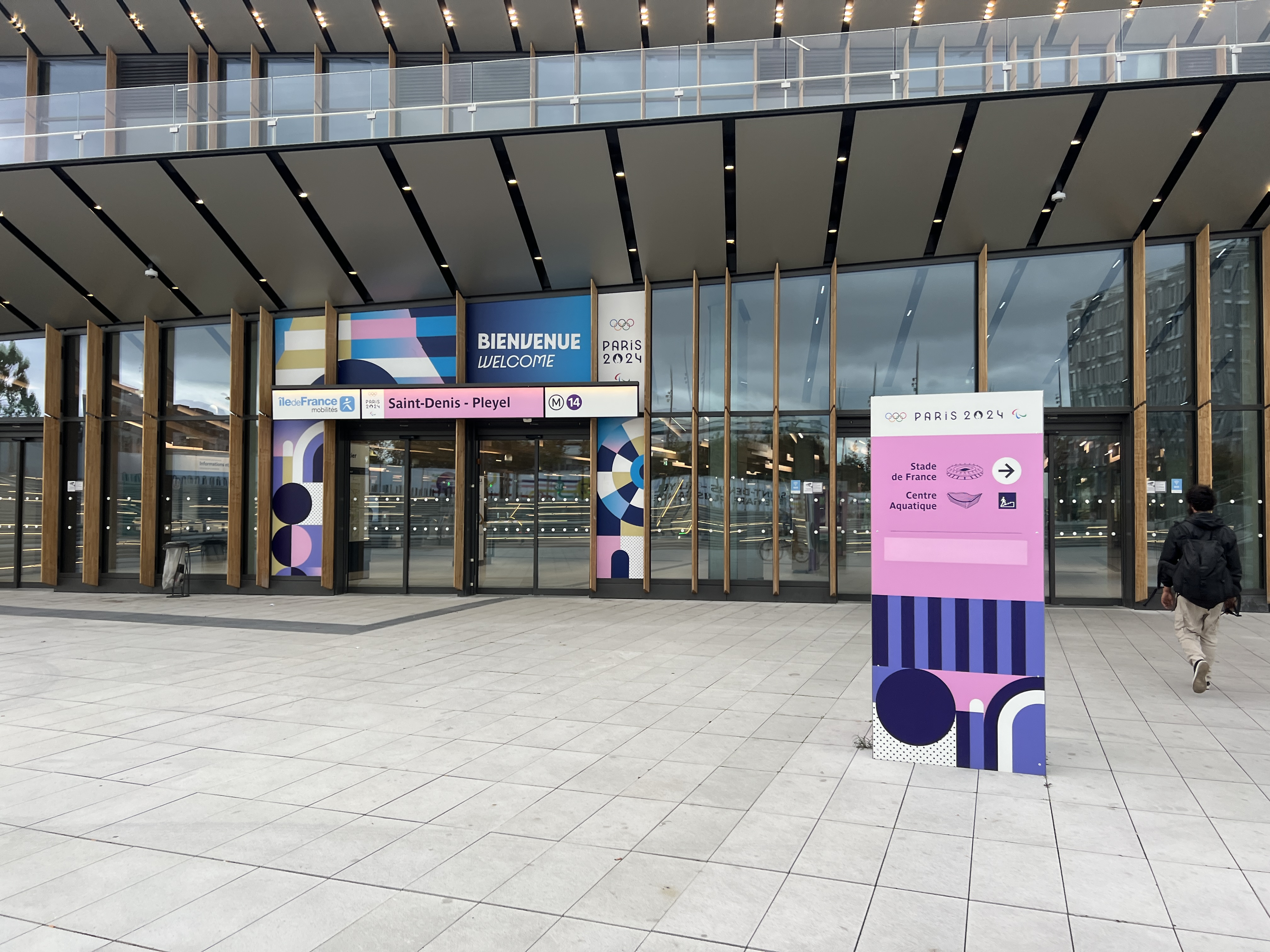
Special signage for the 2024 Games on the Paris metro, here in the Saint-Denis–Pleyel station

Over €500 million was invested in transport improvements for the Games, with extensions to the Paris Metro and 60 kilometres (37 mi) of new cycle lanes. Visitors to Paris paid higher public transport fares during the Games, €4 instead of the previous €2.15 price. This paid for the increased frequency and hours of service for public transport during the Games, with an average increase of 15% in services. As with previous Games, 185 kilometres (115 mi) of reserved traffic lanes was used to ensure reliable journey times for athletes, officials and the media.

=== Volunteers ===
The Paris 2024 volunteer platform for the Olympic and Paralympic Games was opened to the public in March 2023. There were expected to be 45,000 volunteers recruited worldwide for the Games. Following the end of registration on 3 May 2023, over 300,000 applications had been submitted to the Paris Organising Committee, exceeding the number of applicants for the previous two Olympics. Applicants were notified of the outcome of their application between September and December 2023. Over 800 applicants were excluded over security fears, among which 15 were flagged with Fiche S.

=== Torch relay ===
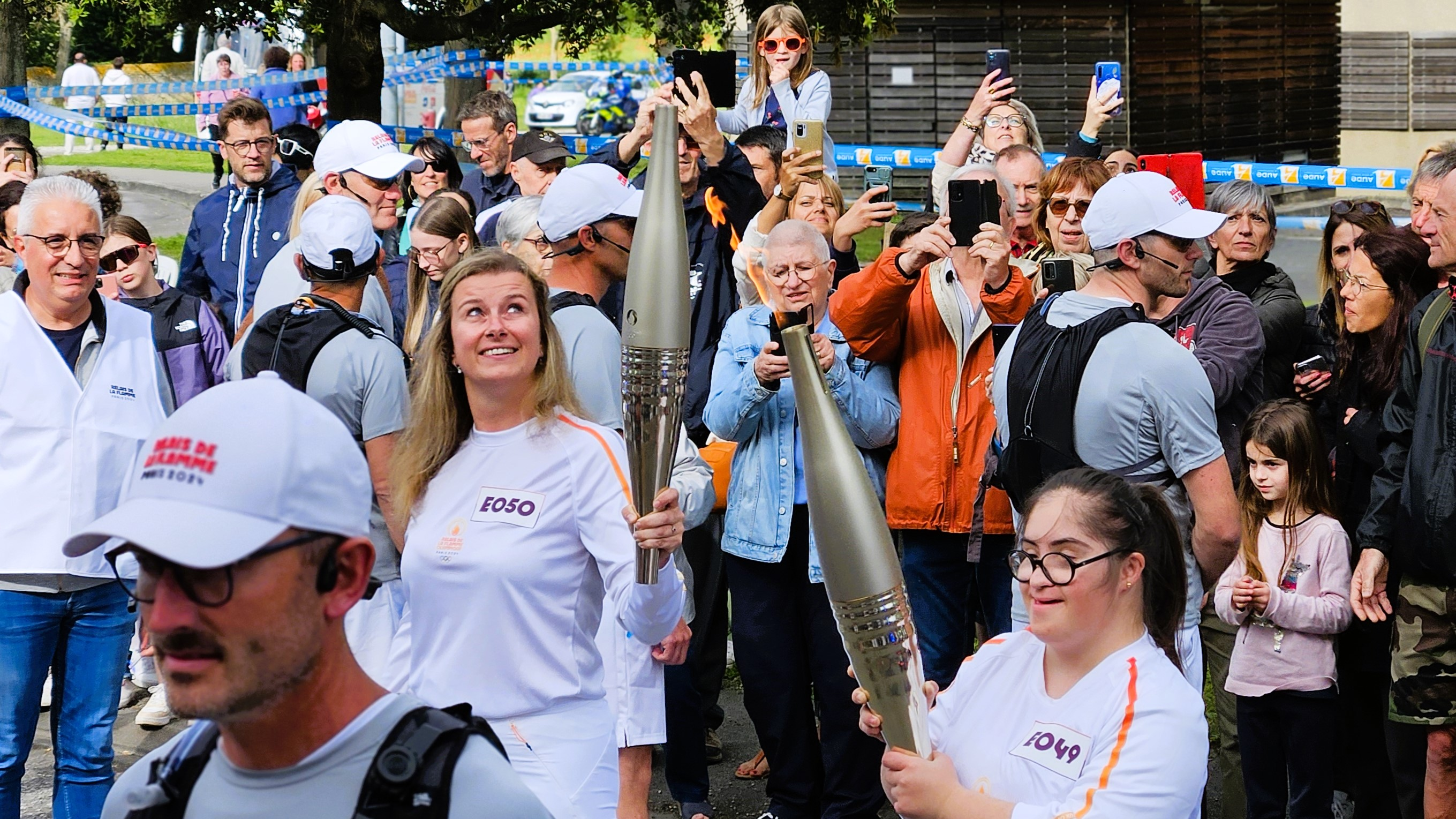
Two torchbearers in Carcassonne

The Olympic torch relay began with the lighting of the Olympic flame on 16 April in Olympia, Greece, 100 days before the start of the Games. Greek rower Stefanos Douskos was the first torchbearer and swimmer Laure Manaudou served as the first French torchbearer. The latter was selected to be one of four captains of the torch relay, alongside swimmer Florent Manaudou (her brother), paratriathlete Mona Francis, and para-athlete Dimitri Pavadé. The torch relay was expected to have 10,000 torchbearers and visit over 400 settlements in 65 French territories, including six overseas. On 18 May, it was reported that the portion of the relay in New Caledonia was cancelled due to ongoing unrest in the collectivity.

=== Tickets ===
9.5 million of the 10 million tickets available for the games were sold, breaking the record held by the 1996 Atlanta Olympics. Several sports reported record attendance.

== The Games ==
=== Opening ceremony ===
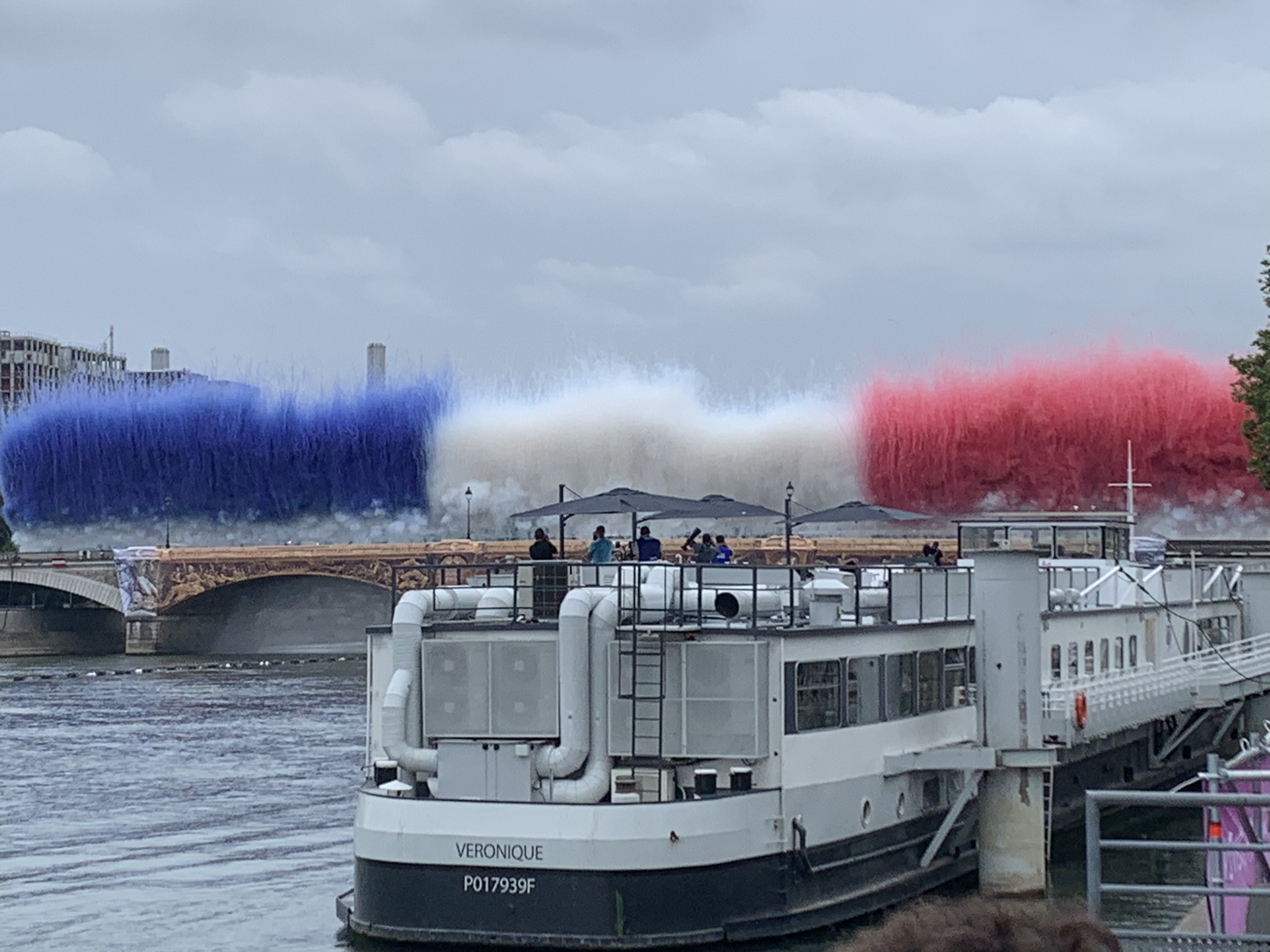
Pyrotechnics at the Pont d'Austerlitz marking the start of the Parade of Nations

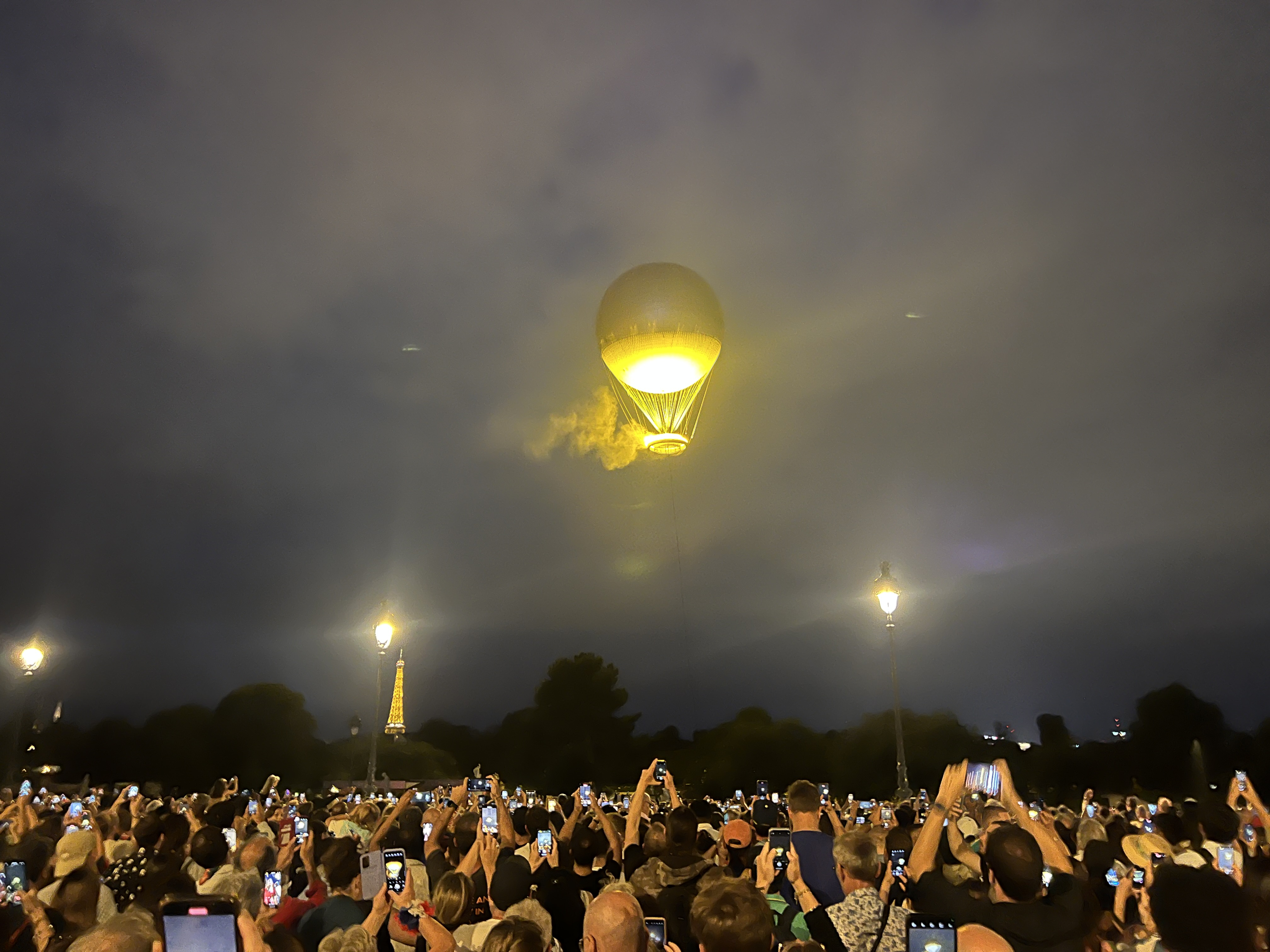
The cauldron flying above the Tuileries Garden during the games. LEDs and aerosol produced the illusion of fire, while the Olympic flame itself was kept in a small lantern nearby

The opening ceremony began at 19:30 CEST (17:30 GMT) on 26 July 2024. Directed by Thomas Jolly, it was the first Summer Olympics opening ceremony to be held outside the traditional stadium setting; the parade of athletes was conducted as a boat parade along the Seine from Pont d'Austerlitz to Pont d'Iéna, and cultural segments took place at various landmarks along the route. Jolly stated that the ceremony would highlight notable moments in the history of France, with an overall theme of love and "shared humanity". The French Assassin Arno Dorian appeared to carry the olympic torch through the streets of parkour. The athletes then attended the official protocol at Jardins du Trocadéro, in front of the Eiffel Tower. Approximately 326,000 tickets were sold for viewing locations along the Seine, 222,000 of which were distributed primarily to the Games' volunteers, youth and low-income families, among others. Most of the ceremony took place under the rain, rather than in the sun.

The ceremony featured music performances by American musician Lady Gaga, French-Malian singer Aya Nakamura, heavy metal band Gojira and soprano Marina Viotti, Axelle Saint-Cirel (who sang the French national anthem "La Marseillaise" atop the Grand Palais), rapper Rim'K, Philippe Katerine (who portrayed the Greek god Dionysus), Juliette Armanet and Sofiane Pamart, and was closed by Canadian singer Céline Dion. The Games were formally opened by president Emmanuel Macron.

The Olympics and Paralympics cauldron was lit by Guadeloupean judoka Teddy Riner and sprinter Marie-José Pérec; it had a hot air balloon-inspired design topped by a 30-metre-tall (98 ft) helium sphere, and was allowed to float into the air above the Tuileries Garden at night. For the first time, the cauldron was not illuminated through combustion; the flames were simulated by an LED lighting system and aerosol water jets.

Reactions at home and worldwide were mixed. France's newspapers of record, Le Monde considered it a "dream-like spectacle" that showcased a country that was "inclusive" and "unafraid of controversy", while Libération described it as "imbued with inclusivity and self-deprecation", and hailed a "catharsis that was all the more welcome" after the stress of France's snap elections and "sublimated by the rain that turned into an artistic asset". The conservative Le Figaro described it as "a grandiose and sumptuous spectacle", but demonstrating that France "[can't] help drawing from its revolutionary guts the spirit of provocation and discord that has always fueled its paradoxes and divisions". French right-wing newspapers and commentators were less impressed, and called it 'woke propaganda'.

Controversy ensued at the opening ceremony when a segment was interpreted by some as a parody of the Last Supper. The organisers apologised for any offence caused. The Olympic World Library and fact-checkers would later debunk the interpretation that the segment was a parody of the Last Supper. The Olympic flag was also raised upside down. During the parade of nations, Algerian athletes carried red roses and threw them into the Seine to commemorate the 1961 Paris massacre.

During the day of the opening ceremony, there were reports of a blackout in Paris, although this was also later debunked.

=== Sports ===
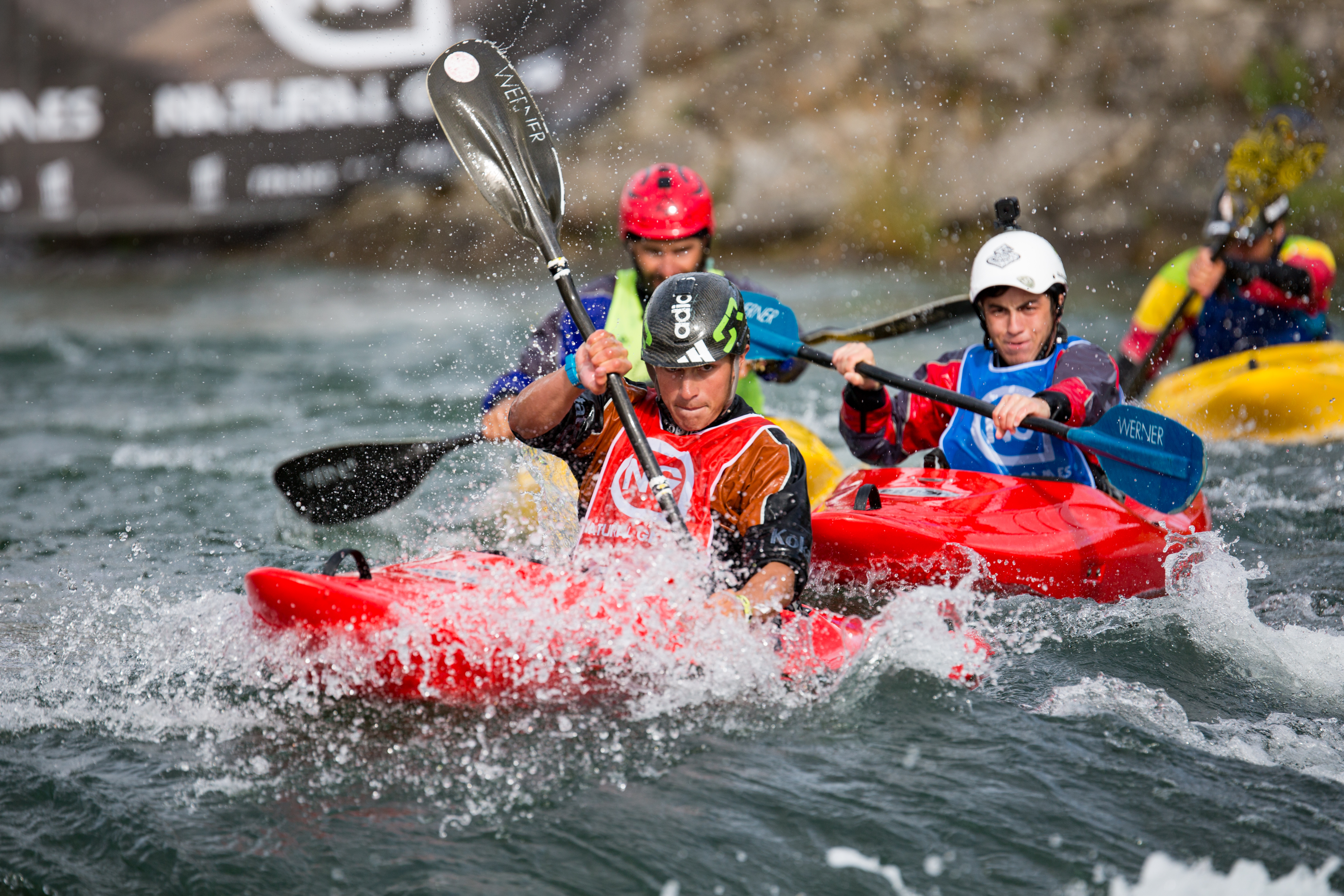
The disciplines of kayak cross (pictured) and kiteboarding made their debut in the core Olympic programme.

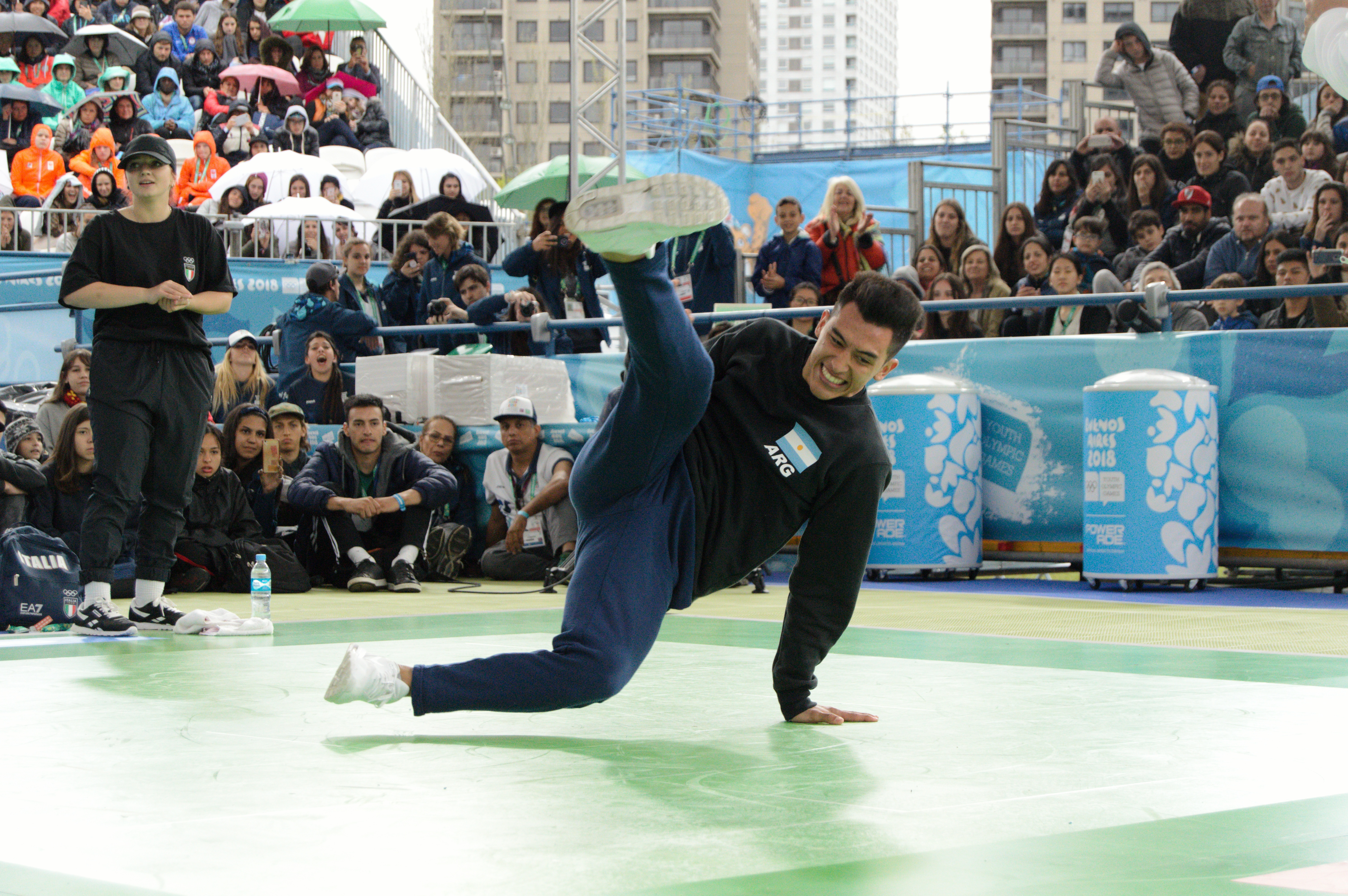
Breaking (pictured) was selected as one of four discretionary sports for the games alongside skateboarding, sport climbing, and surfing.

The programme of the 2024 Summer Olympics featured 329 medal events in 32 sports, encompassing a total of 48 disciplines. This included the 28 "core" Olympic sports contested in 2016 and 2020, and 4 optional sports that were proposed by the Paris Organising Committee; breakdancing made its Olympic debut as an optional sport, while skateboarding, sport climbing, and surfing returned to the programme, having debuted at the 2020 Summer Olympics. Four events were dropped from weightlifting. In canoeing, two sprint events were replaced with two slalom events, keeping the overall event total at 16. In sport climbing, the previous "combined" event was divided into two separate disciplines: speed climbing, and boulder-and-lead.

When Paris was bidding for the Games in August 2017, the Paris Organising Committee announced an intention to hold talks with the IOC and professional esports organisations about the possibility of introducing competitive esports events in 2024. In July 2018, the IOC confirmed that esports would not be considered for the 2024 Olympics. At the 134th IOC Session in June 2019, the IOC approved the Paris Organising Committee's proposed optional sports of breaking (breakdance), along with skateboarding, sport climbing, and surfing, three sports that were first included in 2020.

In the 2024 Paris Olympics, several new events and formats have been introduced. Formula Kite made its debut, described as the "Formula One of the Olympics", featuring high-speed foil racing with separate events for men and women. Kayak cross also debuted, where four athletes race against each other on a course with multiple gates, marking the first head-to-head race in Olympic canoe slalom history. Sport climbing returned with a new format, splitting into bouldering and lead combined events in addition to a speed event. 3x3 basketball, which debuted in Tokyo, was back with finals scheduled for 5 August at Place de La Concorde. Changes in other sports included the introduction of men's participation in artistic swimming, a new women's weight class in boxing, and the addition of a marathon race walk mixed relay in track and field.

- Aquatics
  - Artistic swimming (2)
  - Diving (8)
  - Marathon swimming (2)
  - Swimming (35)
  - Water polo (2)
- Archery (5)
- Athletics (48)
- Badminton (5)
- Basketball
  - Basketball (2)
  - 3×3 basketball (2)
- Boxing (13)
- Breaking (2)
- Canoeing
  - Slalom (6)
  - Sprint (10)
- Cycling
  - BMX freestyle (2)
  - BMX racing (2)
  - Mountain biking (2)
  - Road (4)
  - Track (12)
- Equestrian
  - Dressage (2)
  - Eventing (2)
  - Jumping (2)
- Fencing (12)
- Field hockey (2)
- Football (2)
- Golf (2)
- Gymnastics
  - Artistic (14)
  - Rhythmic (2)
  - Trampoline (2)
- Handball (2)
- Judo (15)
- Modern pentathlon (2)
- Rowing (14)
- Rugby sevens (2)
- Sailing (10)
- Shooting (15)
- Skateboarding (4)
- Sport climbing (4)
- Surfing (2)
- Table tennis (5)
- Taekwondo (8)
- Tennis (5)
- Triathlon (3)
- Volleyball
  - Volleyball (2)
  - Beach volleyball (2)
- Weightlifting (10)
- Wrestling
  - Freestyle (12)
  - Greco-Roman (6)

=== Medal reallocations from previous Olympics ===
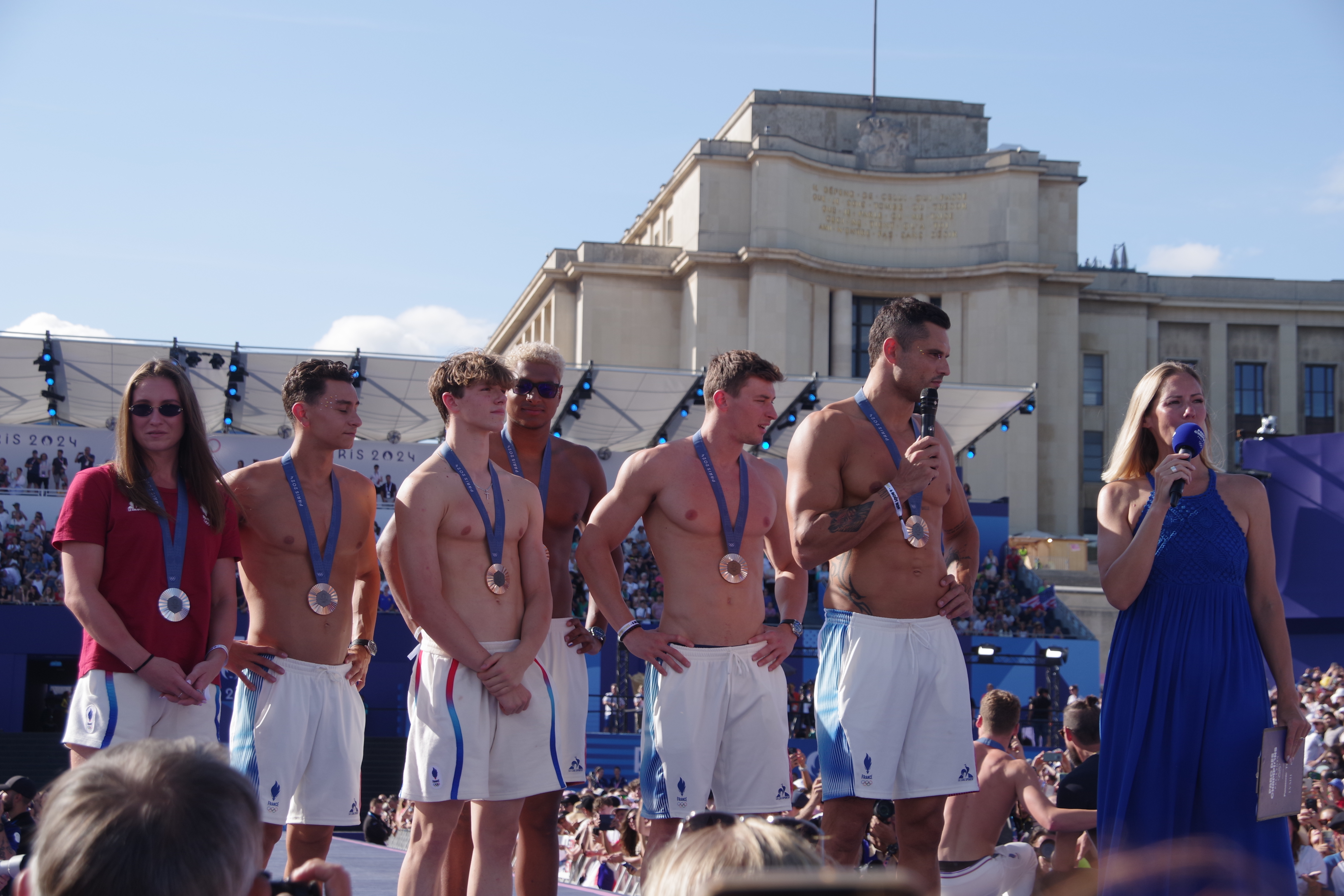
French swimming team celebrating at Parc des Champions

In addition to the Medalist Celebrations and the protocolar parts of the Opening Ceremony, the Champions Park also received some medal reallocation ceremonies from previous Summer Olympics dating back as far as 2000. Due to new IOC rules and protocols, one Winter Olympic medal awarding ceremony also held in this venue was for the figure skating team event from the 2022 Winter Olympics in Beijing. It had been the first Olympic medal ceremony to be delayed after Kamila Valieva from original gold medalist Russia was reported and then confirmed to have tested positive in 2021 for trimetazidine. In January 2024, the Court of Arbitration for Sport disqualified Valieva for four years retroactive to 25 December 2021 for an anti-doping rule violation, and the International Skating Union subsequently subtracted Valieva's scores, which upgraded the United States and Japan to gold and silver, respectively. Canada, which had originally placed fourth, failed in their bid to have Russia's bronze medal taken away. Under the IOC's new Medal Reallocation Rules, the IOC, the ISU, and the National Olympic Committees for both the United States and Japan coordinated this medal ceremony. There was thus trail maintenance used during Beijing 2022. However, both delegations for weather reasons wore their Paris 2024 uniforms. The Beijing 2022 soundtrack was still used for the medal ceremony, but both teams wore Paris 2024 national uniforms and it was the first medal ceremony from the 2022 Winter Olympics to have a full crowd, as there had been reduced audiences in 2022 due to the COVID-19 pandemic. The Russian team was unable to attend the medal ceremony due to the suspension of the Russian Olympic Committee (ROC) and other related logistical issues.

=== Closing ceremony ===
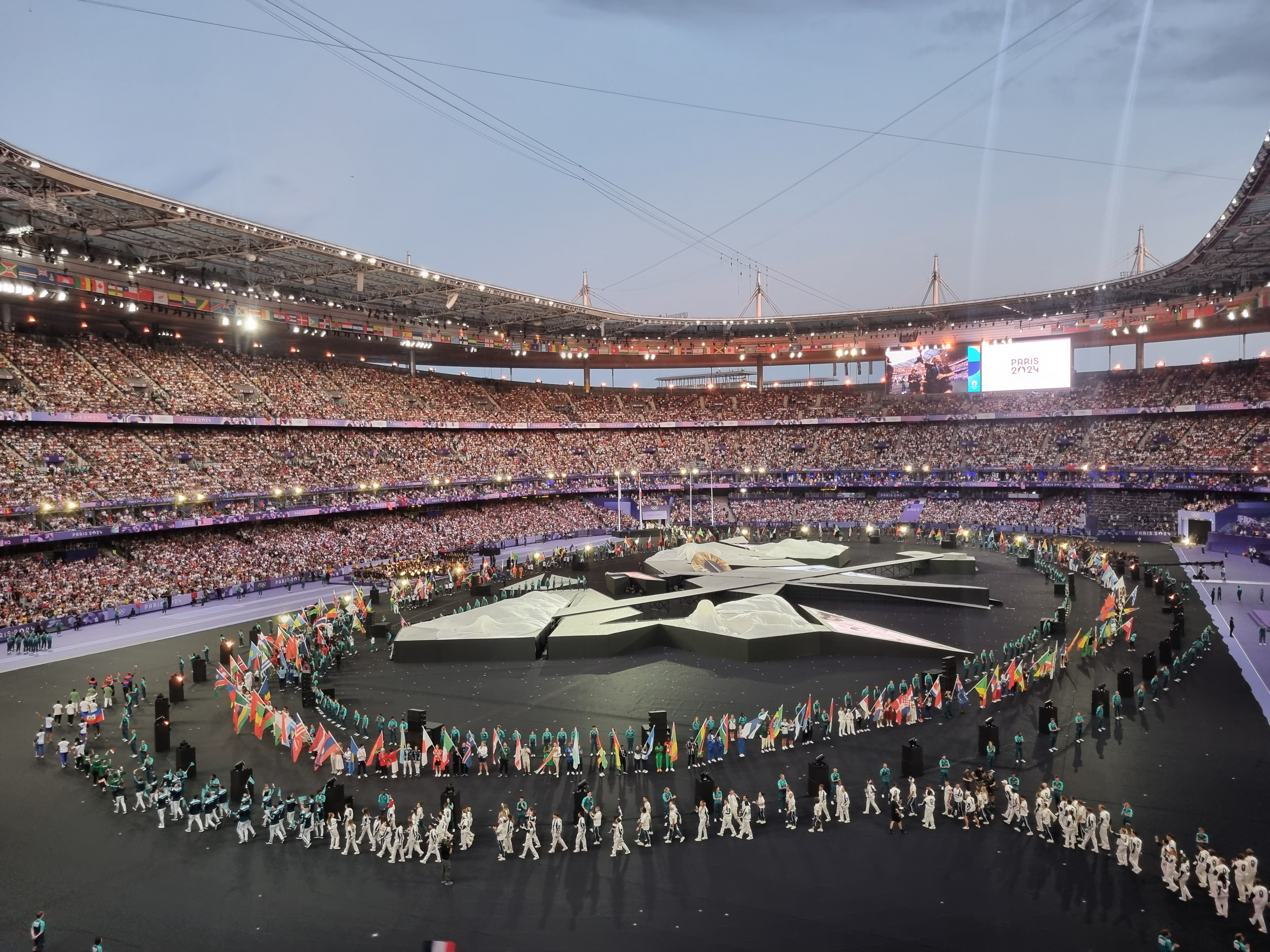

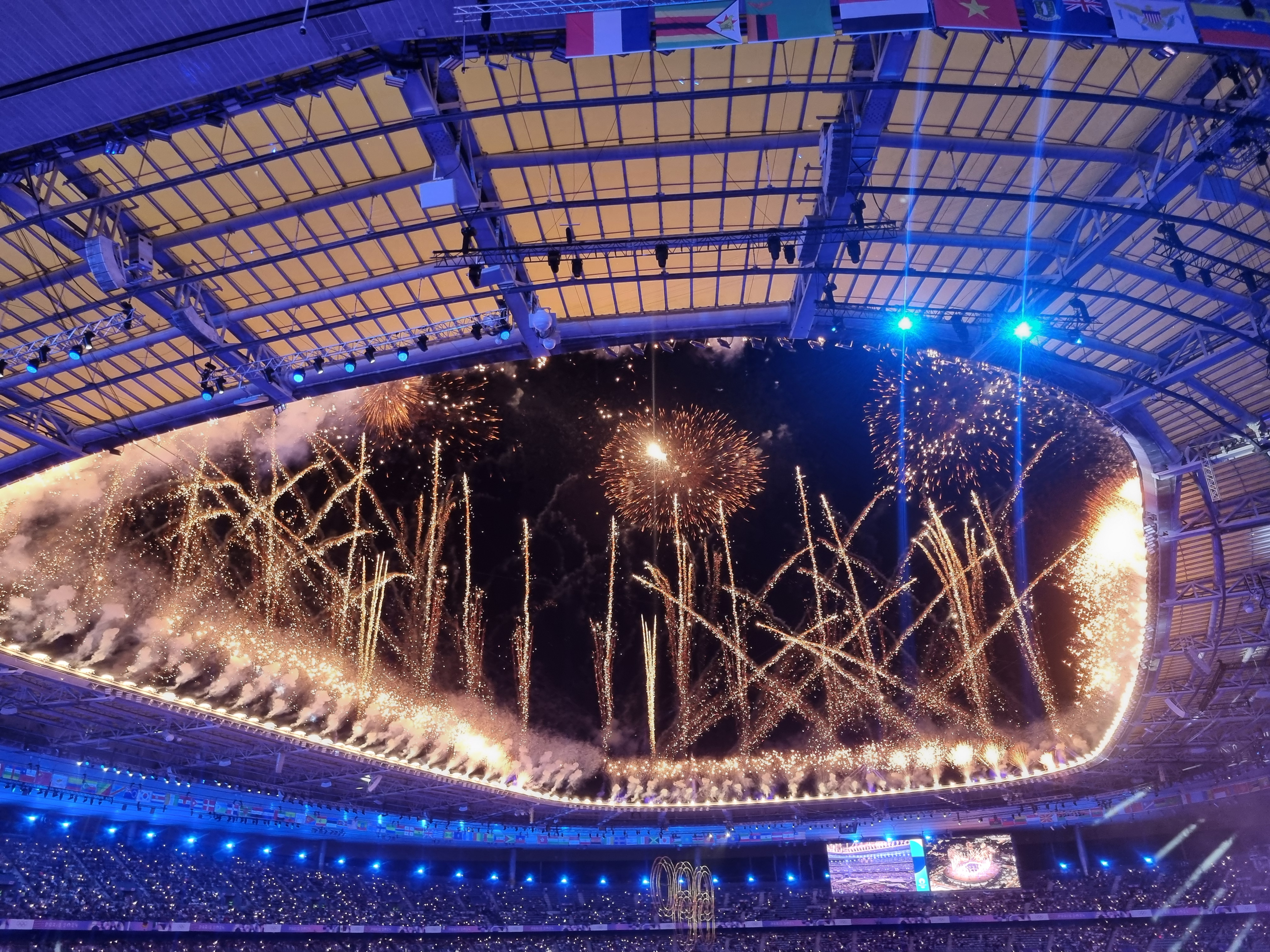
The ceremony and final fireworks

The closing ceremony was held at Stade de France on 11 August 2024, and thus marked the first time in any Olympics since Sarajevo 1984 that opening and closing ceremonies were held in different locations. Titled "Records", the ceremony was themed around a dystopian future, where the Olympic Games have disappeared, and a group of aliens reinvent it. It featured more than a hundred performers, including acrobats, dancers and circus artists. During the handover ceremonies, the American actor Tom Cruise also appeared with American performers Red Hot Chili Peppers, Billie Eilish, Snoop Dogg, and H.E.R. during the LA28 Handover Celebration portion of the ceremony. The Antwerp Ceremony, in which the Olympic flag was handed to Los Angeles, the host city of the 2028 Summer Olympics, was produced by Ben Winston and his studio Fulwell 73.

== Participating National Olympic Committees ==
Of the 206 National Olympic Committees, 204 were represented at the 2024 Summer Games with 54 from Africa, 48 from Europe, 44 from Asia, 41 from the Americas and 17 from Oceania. North Korea returned to the Games in 2024, after serving a cycle of suspension due to the "boycott" of the 2020 Summer Olympics. Following the Russian invasion of Ukraine, the IOC suspended the Olympic Committees of Russia and Belarus for violating the Olympic Truce. Russian and Belarusian athletes instead competed as "Individual Neutral Athletes" (AIN) without national identification, as long as they did not "actively" support the war. Individual neutral athletes had to be approved by each sport's international federation, and then the IOC's panel. As individual athletes, AIN was not considered a delegation during the opening ceremony or in the medal tables. They were also not allowed to compete in team events like basketball and volleyball. The Refugee Olympic Team also competed.

Participating National Olympic Committees
- Afghanistan (6)
- Albania (8)
- Algeria (45)
- American Samoa (2)
- Andorra (2)
- Angola (24)
- Antigua and Barbuda (5)
- Argentina (136)
- Armenia (15)
- Aruba (6)
- Australia (459)
- Austria (78)
- Azerbaijan (48)
- Bahamas (18)
- Bahrain (14)
- Bangladesh (5)
- Barbados (4)
- Belgium (165)
- Belize (1)
- Benin (5)
- Bermuda (8)
- Bhutan (3)
- Bolivia (4)
- Bosnia and Herzegovina (5)
- Botswana (12)
- Brazil (277)
- British Virgin Islands (4)
- Brunei (3)
- Bulgaria (46)
- Burkina Faso (8)
- Burundi (7)
- Cambodia (3)
- Cameroon (6)
- Canada (315)
- Cape Verde (7)
- Cayman Islands (4)
- Central African Republic (4)
- Chad (3)
- Chile (48)
- China (388)
- Colombia (87)
- Comoros (4)
- Cook Islands (2)
- Costa Rica (6)
- Croatia (73)
- Cuba (61)
- Cyprus (16)
- Czech Republic (111)
- Democratic Republic of the Congo (6)
- Denmark (123)
- Djibouti (7)
- Dominica (4)
- Dominican Republic (58)
- Timor-Leste (4)
- Ecuador (40)
- Egypt (148)
- El Salvador (8)
- Equatorial Guinea (3)
- Eritrea (11)
- Estonia (24)
- Eswatini (3)
- Ethiopia (34)
- Fiji (34)
- Finland (56)
- France (573) (host)
- Gabon (5)
- The Gambia (7)
- Georgia (28)
- Germany (428)
- Ghana (7)
- Great Britain (327)
- Greece (100)
- Grenada (6)
- Guam (8)
- Guatemala (16)
- Guinea (24)
- Guinea-Bissau (6)
- Guyana (5)
- Haiti (7)
- Honduras (4)
- Hong Kong (36)
- Hungary (170)
- Iceland (5)
- India (110)
- Individual Neutral Athletes (32)
- Indonesia (29)
- Iran (40)
- Iraq (22)
- Ireland (134)
- Israel (88)
- Italy (402)
- Ivory Coast (12)
- Jamaica (58)
- Japan (404)
- Jordan (12)
- Kazakhstan (79)
- Kenya (72)
- Kiribati (3)
- Kosovo (9)
- Kuwait (9)
- Kyrgyzstan (16)
- Laos (4)
- Latvia (29)
- Lebanon (10)
- Lesotho (3)
- Liberia (7)
- Libya (6)
- Liechtenstein (1)
- Lithuania (51)
- Luxembourg (13)
- Madagascar (7)
- Malawi (3)
- Malaysia (26)
- Maldives (5)
- Mali (23)
- Malta (5)
- Marshall Islands (4)
- Mauritania (2)
- Mauritius (13)
- Mexico (107)
- Federated States of Micronesia (3)
- Moldova (26)
- Monaco (6)
- Mongolia (32)
- Montenegro (19)
- Morocco (60)
- Mozambique (7)
- Myanmar (2)
- Namibia (4)
- Nauru (1)
- Nepal (7)
- Netherlands (273)
- New Zealand (195)
- Nicaragua (7)
- Niger (7)
- Nigeria (88)
- North Korea (16)
- North Macedonia (7)
- Norway (107)
- Oman (4)
- Pakistan (7)
- Palau (3)
- Palestine (8)
- Panama (8)
- Papua New Guinea (7)
- Paraguay (28)
- Peru (26)
- Philippines (22)
- Poland (210)
- Portugal (73)
- Puerto Rico (51)
- Qatar (13)
- Refugee Olympic Team (37)
- Republic of the Congo (4)
- Romania (106)
- Rwanda (8)
- Saint Kitts and Nevis (3)
- Saint Lucia (4)
- Saint Vincent and the Grenadines (4)
- Samoa (24)
- San Marino (5)
- São Tomé and Príncipe (3)
- Saudi Arabia (9)
- Senegal (11)
- Serbia (113)
- Seychelles (3)
- Sierra Leone (4)
- Singapore (23)
- Slovakia (28)
- Slovenia (90)
- Solomon Islands (2)
- Somalia (1)
- South Africa (142)
- South Korea (141)
- South Sudan (14)
- Spain (383)
- Sri Lanka (6)
- Sudan (4)
- Suriname (5)
- Sweden (115)
- Switzerland (128)
- Syria (6)
- Chinese Taipei (60)
- Tajikistan (14)
- Tanzania (7)
- Thailand (51)
- Togo (5)
- Tonga (4)
- Trinidad and Tobago (18)
- Tunisia (27)
- Turkey (101)
- Turkmenistan (6)
- Tuvalu (2)
- Uganda (24)
- Ukraine (139)
- United Arab Emirates (13)
- United States (592)
- Uruguay (25)
- Uzbekistan (85)
- Vanuatu (6)
- Venezuela (33)
- Vietnam (16)
- Virgin Islands (5)
- Yemen (4)
- Zambia (27)
- Zimbabwe (7)

Number of athletes by National Olympic Committees (Note: As of 26 July 2024)

Ranking	NOC	Athletes
1	United States	592
2	France	573
3	Australia	459
4	Germany	428
5	Japan	404
6	Italy	402
7	China	388
8	Spain	383
9	Great Britain	327
10	Canada	315
11	Brazil	277
12	Netherlands	273
13	Poland	218
14	New Zealand	195
15	Hungary	178
16	Belgium	165
17	Egypt	148
18	South Africa	142
19	South Korea	141
20	Ukraine	140
21	Argentina	136
22	Ireland	134
23	Switzerland	128
24	Denmark	123
25	Sweden	118
26	Serbia	112
27	Czech Republic	111
28	India	110
29	Mexico	107
30	Norway	107
31	Romania	106
32	Turkey	102
33	Greece	100
34	Slovenia	90
35	Israel	88
35	Nigeria	88
37	Colombia	87
38	Uzbekistan	86
39	Kazakhstan	79
40	Austria	78
41	Croatia	73
41	Portugal	73
43	Kenya	72
44	Cuba	61
45	Chinese Taipei	60
45	Morocco	60
47	Dominican Republic	58
47	Jamaica	58
49	Finland	56
50	Puerto Rico	51
50	Thailand	51
50	Lithuania	51
53	Chile	48
53	Azerbaijan	48
55	Bulgaria	46
56	Algeria	45
57	Iran	41
58	Ecuador	40
59	Refugee Olympic Team	37
60	Hong Kong	36
61	Ethiopia	34
62	Fiji	33
62	Venezuela	33
64	Individual Neutral Athletes	32
64	Mongolia	32
66	Indonesia	29
66	Latvia	29
68	Georgia	28
68	Paraguay	28
68	Slovakia	28
71	Tunisia	27
71	Zambia	27
73	Malaysia	26
73	Moldova	26
73	Peru	26
76	Uruguay	25
77	Angola	24
77	Estonia	24
77	Guinea	24
77	Samoa	24
77	Uganda	24
82	Mali	23
82	Singapore	23
84	Iraq	22
84	Philippines	22
86	Montenegro	19
87	Bahamas	18
87	Trinidad and Tobago	18
89	Cyprus	16
89	Guatemala	16
89	Kyrgyzstan	16
89	North Korea	16
89	Vietnam	16
94	Armenia	15
95	Luxembourg	14
95	Qatar	14
95	South Sudan	14
95	Tajikistan	14
99	Bahrain	13
99	Mauritius	13
99	United Arab Emirates	13
102	Eritrea	12
102	Jordan	12
104	Botswana	11
104	Ivory Coast	11
104	Senegal	11
107	Lebanon	10
108	Kosovo	9
108	Kuwait	9
108	Saudi Arabia	9
111	Albania	8
111	Bermuda	8
111	Burkina Faso	8
111	El Salvador	8
111	Ghana	8
111	Guam	8
111	Liberia	8
111	Palestine	8
111	Panama	8
111	Rwanda	8
121	Burundi	7
121	Cape Verde	7
121	Djibouti	7
121	The Gambia	7
121	Haiti	7
121	Madagascar	7
121	Mozambique	7
121	Nepal	7
121	Nicaragua	7
121	Niger	7
121	North Macedonia	7
121	Pakistan	7
121	Papua New Guinea	7
121	Tanzania	7
121	Zimbabwe	7
136	Afghanistan	6
136	Aruba	6
136	Cameroon	6
136	Costa Rica	6
136	Democratic Republic of the Congo	6
136	Grenada	6
136	Guinea-Bissau	6
136	Libya	6
136	Monaco	6
136	Sri Lanka	6
136	Syria	6
136	Turkmenistan	6
136	Vanuatu	6
149	Antigua and Barbuda	5
149	Bangladesh	5
149	Benin	5
149	Bosnia and Herzegovina	5
149	Gabon	5
149	Guyana	5
149	Iceland	5
149	Maldives	5
149	Malta	5
149	San Marino	5
149	Suriname	5
149	Togo	5
149	Virgin Islands	5
162	Barbados	4
162	British Virgin Islands	4
162	Bolivia	4
162	Cayman Islands	4
162	Central African Republic	4
162	Comoros	4
162	Dominica	4
162	Timor-Leste	4
162	Honduras	4
162	Laos	4
162	Marshall Islands	4
162	Namibia	4
162	Oman	4
162	Republic of the Congo	4
162	Saint Vincent and the Grenadines	4
162	Saint Lucia	4
162	Sierra Leone	4
162	Sudan	4
162	Tonga	4
162	Yemen	4
182	Bhutan	3
182	Brunei	3
182	Cambodia	3
182	Chad	3
182	Equatorial Guinea	3
182	Eswatini	3
182	Federated States of Micronesia	3
182	Kiribati	3
182	Lesotho	3
182	Malawi	3
182	Palau	3
182	Saint Kitts and Nevis	3
182	São Tomé and Príncipe	3
182	Seychelles	3
196	American Samoa	2
196	Andorra	2
196	Cook Islands	2
196	Mauritania	2
196	Myanmar	2
196	Solomon Islands	2
196	Tuvalu	2
203	Belize	1
203	Liechtenstein	1
203	Nauru	1
203	Somalia	1

== Calendar ==
In the following calendar for the 2024 Summer Olympics, each blue box represents an event competition, such as a qualification round, on that day. The yellow boxes represent days during which medal-awarding finals for a sport were held. On the left, the calendar lists each sport with events held during the Games, and at the right how many gold medals were won in that sport. There is a key at the top of the calendar to aid the reader.

All times and dates use Central European Summer Time (UTC+2); except Tahiti uses UTC-10

OC	Opening ceremony	●	Event competitions	1	Gold medal events	CC	Closing ceremony

July/August 2024		July								August											Events
July/August 2024		24th Wed	25th Thu	26th Fri	27th Sat	28th Sun	29th Mon	30th Tue	31st Wed	1st Thu	2nd Fri	3rd Sat	4th Sun	5th Mon	6th Tue	7th Wed	8th Thu	9th Fri	10th Sat	11th Sun	Events
Ceremonies				OC																CC	—N/a
Aquatics	Artistic swimming													●	●	1		●	1		2
Aquatics	Diving				1		1		1		1			●	1	●	1	1	1		8
Aquatics	Marathon swimming																1	1			2
Aquatics	Swimming				4	3	5	3	5	4	3	4	4								35
Aquatics	Water polo				●	●	●	●	●	●	●	●	●	●	●	●	●	●	1	1	2
Archery			●			1	1	●	●	●	1	1	1								5
Athletics										2	1	5	3	4	5	5	5	8	9	1	48
Badminton					●	●	●	●	●	●	1	1	1	2							5
Basketball	Basketball				●	●	●	●	●	●	●	●	●		●	●	●	●	1	1	2
Basketball	3×3 Basketball							●	●	●	●	●	●	2							2
Boxing					●	●	●	●	●	●	●	●	●		1	2	2	4	4		13
Breaking																		1	1		2
Canoeing	Slalom				●	1	1	●	1	1	●	●	●	2							6
Canoeing	Sprint														●	●	3	4	3		10
Cycling	Road cycling				2							1	1								4
Cycling	Track cycling													1	1	2	2	2	1	3	12
Cycling	BMX							●	2	●	2										4
Cycling	Mountain biking					1	1														2
Equestrian
Equestrian	Dressage							●	●			1	1								2
Equestrian	Eventing				●	●	2														2
Equestrian	Jumping									●	1			●	1						2
Fencing					2	2	2	1	1	1	1	1	1								12
Field hockey					●	●	●	●	●	●	●	●	●	●	●	●	1	1			2
Football		●	●		●	●		●	●		●	●		●	●		●	1	1		2
Golf										●	●	●	1			●	●	●	1		2
Gymnastics	Artistic				●	●	1	1	1	1		3	3	4							14
Gymnastics	Rhythmic																●	1	1		2
Gymnastics	Trampoline										2										2
Handball			●		●	●	●	●	●	●	●	●	●		●	●	●	●	1	1	2
Judo					2	2	2	2	2	2	2	1									15
Modern pentathlon																	●	●	1	1	2
Rowing					●	●	●	●	2	4	4	4									14
Rugby sevens		●	●		1	●	●	1													2
Sailing						●	●	●	●	●	2	2	●	●	●	2	3	1			10
Shooting					1	2	2	2	1	1	1	2	1	2							15
Skateboarding						1	1								1	1					4
Sport climbing														●	●	1	1	1	1		4
Surfing					●	●	●			●				2							2
Table tennis					●	●	●	1	●	●	●	1	1	●	●	●	●	1	1		5
Taekwondo																2	2	2	2		8
Tennis					●	●	●	●	●	●	1	2	2								5
Triathlon									2					1							3
Volleyball	Beach volleyball				●	●	●	●	●	●	●	●	●	●	●	●	●	1	1		2
Volleyball	Volleyball				●	●	●	●	●	●	●	●	●	●	●	●	●	●	1	1	2
Weightlifting																2	2	2	3	1	10
Wrestling														●	3	3	3	3	3	3	18
Daily medal events		0			13	13	19	11	18	16	23	29	20	20	13	21	26	35	39	13	329
Cumulative total		0			13	26	45	56	74	90	113	142	162	182	195	216	242	277	316	329	329
July/August 2024
July/August 2024		24th Wed	25th Thu	26th Fri	27th Sat	28th Sun	29th Mon	30th Tue	31st Wed	1st Thu	2nd Fri	3rd Sat	4th Sun	5th Mon	6th Tue	7th Wed	8th Thu	9th Fri	10th Sat	11th Sun	Total events
July/August 2024		July								August											Total events

== Medal table ==
Bronze medal Paris 2024

Key

‡ Changes in medal standings (see here)

* Host nation (France)

2024 Summer Olympics medal table (Note: Although the IOC does not include Individual Neutral Athletes in the official medal tables, they are listed here for comparison purposes.) (Note: Figures in table reflect all official changes in medal standings.)
Rank	NOC	Gold	Silver	Bronze	Total
1	United States‡	40	44	42	126
2	China	40	27	24	91
3	Japan	20	12	13	45
4	Australia	18	19	16	53
5	France*	16	26	22	64
6	Netherlands	15	7	12	34
7	Great Britain	14	22	29	65
8	South Korea	13	9	10	32
9	Italy	12	13	15	40
10	Germany	12	13	8	33
11–91	Remaining NOCs	129	138	194	461
Totals (91 entries)		329	330	385	1,044

=== Podium sweeps ===
There was one podium sweep during the Games:

Date	Sport	Event	Team	Gold	Silver	Bronze	Ref
2 August	Cycling	Men's BMX race	France	Joris Daudet	Sylvain André	Romain Mahieu	

== Marketing ==
=== Emblem ===
The emblem for the 2024 Summer Olympics and Paralympics was unveiled on 21 October 2019 at the Grand Rex. Inspired by Art Deco, it is a representation of Marianne, the national personification of France, with a flame formed in negative space by her hair. The emblem also resembles a gold medal. Tony Estanguet explained that the emblem symbolised "the power and the magic of the Games", and the Games being "for people". The use of a female figure also serves as an homage to the 1900 Summer Olympics in Paris, which were the first to allow women to participate. The emblem was designed by the French designer Sylvain Boyer with the French design agencies Royalties & Ecobranding.

The emblem for Paris 2024 was considered the biggest new logo release of 2019 by many design magazines. An Opinion Way survey showed that 83 per cent of French people say they liked the new Paris 2024 Games emblem. Approval ratings were high, with 82 per cent of those surveyed finding it aesthetically appealing and 78 per cent finding it to be creative. It was met with some mockery on social media, one user commenting that the logo "would be better suited to a dating site or a hair salon".

For the first time, the corresponding Paralympics shared the same emblem as the Olympics, with no difference bar the governing bodies' logo, reflecting a shared "ambition" between both events.

=== Mascots ===
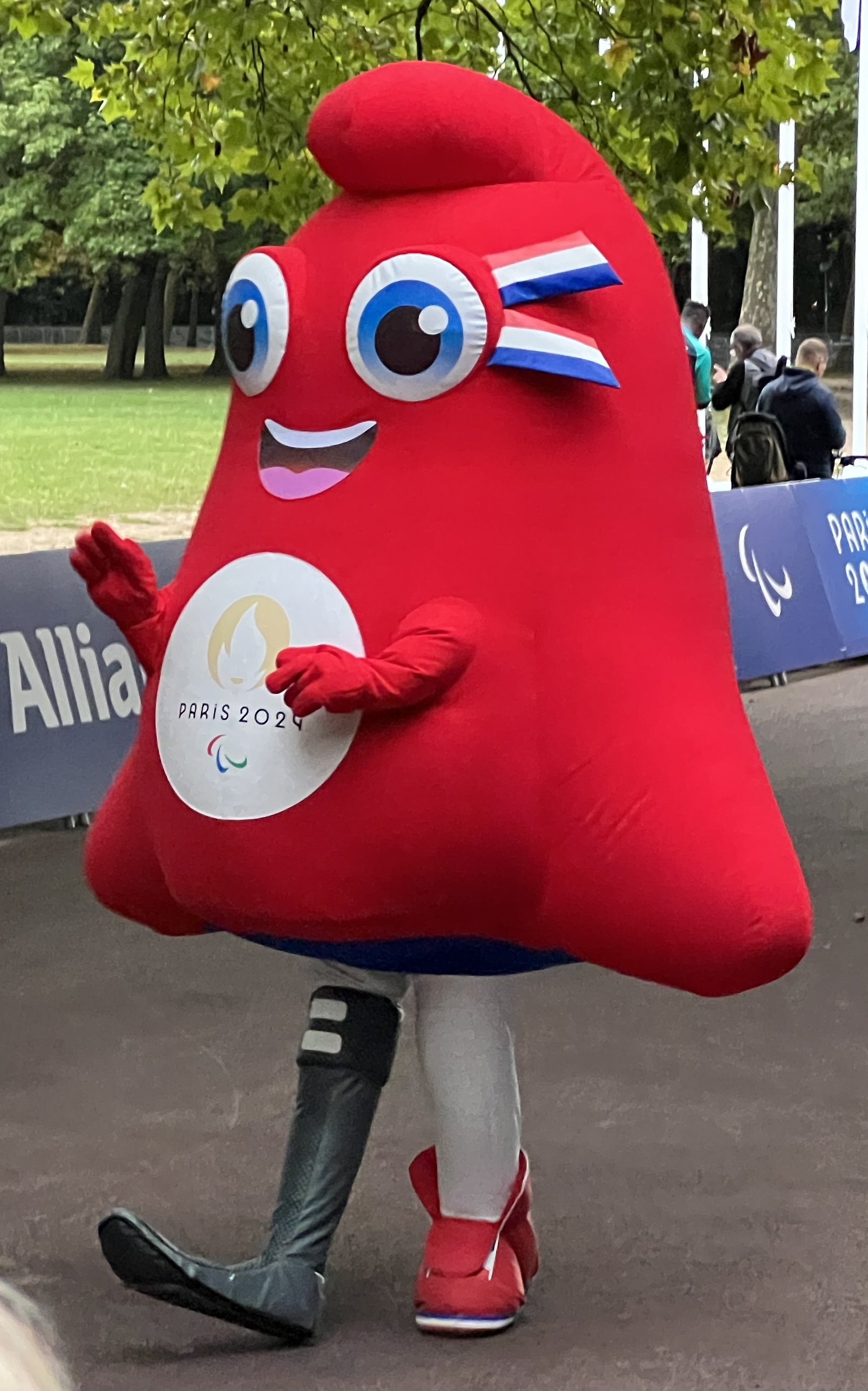
Paralympic Phryge

On 14 November 2022, the Phryges were unveiled as the mascots of the 2024 Summer Olympics and Paralympics; they are a pair of anthropomorphic Phrygian caps, a historic French symbol of freedom and liberty. Marianne is commonly depicted wearing the Phrygian cap, including in the Eugène Delacroix painting, Liberty Leading the People. The two mascots share a motto of "Alone we go faster, but together we go further".

Public opinion of the Olympic mascots shifted. Initially, the French viewed the Phryges as "childish" or a "blob," with national polls showing that fewer than half understood the design. Many locals also joked that the conical hats closely resembled a giant anatomical clitoris.

=== Merchandise ===
In April 2024, the official Olympic video game titled Olympics Go! Paris 2024 was announced for release in June by Animoca Brands on Android, iOS, and Microsoft Windows devices. The 2024 Summer Olympics became the first Summer Olympics in over 30 years to not have an official console video game.

=== Posters ===
The Olympic poster for these games was revealed on 4 March 2024. Designed by Ugo Gattoni, the poster uses a diptych design, with one half representing the Olympics and the other half representing the Paralympics. For the first time in Summer Games history, the Olympic poster and Paralympic poster were designed together, as each one can work independently as halves, or be combined into one poster all together. The posters took 2,000 hours, across six months to complete.

=== Corporate sponsorship ===
A TGM Research survey found that Coca-Cola was globally the most connected brand with the 2024 Olympics, with 23% of people mentioning it. Nike came in second with 16%, despite not being an official sponsor of the Olympic Games.

Belgian beverage company AB InBev became the first Worldwide Olympic Partner during the Games, while five companies would not renew their sponsorships after 2024; automobile manufacturer Toyota, reportedly unhappy with how the IOC has used its sponsorship money, arguing that it is not effectively used to support athletes or promote sport; Panasonic, under continuous management considerations regarding sponsorship, with the company also looking to expand its businesses outside consumer electronics; and Bridgestone, with the company instead wanting to strengthen its motorsports division. Atos and Intel let their sponsorships lapse; Deloitte would replace Atos as the IOC's lead technology integrator in 2025.

Under an agreement as "Premium" sponsor reportedly valued at €150 million ($163 million), French luxury goods conglomerate LVMH was involved in aspects of the Games, with its brand Louis Vuitton providing the trunks used to store the Olympic torch and medals, and the outfits and trays for medal presenters. Former IOC marketing head Michael Payne raised concerns that the prominent use of LVMH goods as part of the Olympics (and in particular, the opening ceremony, which also featured the aforementioned items as props, and performers Aya Nakamura and Lady Gaga wearing Dior haute couture) could cause conflicts with other official sponsors, noting that "the direction of stylish sponsor product placement may not be wrong but needs exceptionally careful management. LVMH got a massive free global ad last night and other partners are all going to be asking, how did that work?"

Sponsors of the 2024 Summer Olympics
Worldwide Olympic Partners
- AB InBev (Corona Cero)
- Airbnb
- Alibaba Group
- Allianz
- Atos
- Bridgestone
- Coca-Cola-Mengniu Dairy
- Deloitte
- Intel
- Omega SA
- Panasonic
- Procter & Gamble
- Samsung Electronics
- Toyota
- Visa Inc.
Premium Partners
- Accor
- BPCE Group
- Carrefour
- EDF
- LVMH
- Orange Group
- Sanofi
Official Partners
- Air France–KLM (Air France)
- ArcelorMittal
- CDC
- Cisco
- CMA CGM
- Danone
- Decathlon
- FDJ
- GL events
- Groupe ADP
- Île-de-France Mobilités
- Le Coq Sportif
- PwC
Official Suppliers and Supporters
- Abatable
- Abéo
- Air Liquide
- Airweave
- Aquatique Show
- Arena Group
- Carlsberg Group (Tourtel Twist)
- CRYSTAL
- Doublet-Wasserman
- DXC Technology
- Egis Group
- Enedis
- ES Global
- Eviden
- Fitness Park
- Fnac Darty
- Gerflor
- Highfield Boats
- Hype Taxi
- Indigo Group
- La Poste
- Loxam
- Lyreco
- Mondo
- MTD
- Myrtha Pools
- Nestlé (Garden Gourmet)
- OnePlan
- Optic 2000
- Randstad NV
- Rapiscan Systems
- RATP Group
- Re-uz
- RGS Events
- Rigby SCC
- Saint-Gobain
- Salesforce
- Schneider Electric
- SEDIF
- SLX
- SNCF (Eurostar)
- Sodexo
- Technogym
- Terraillon
- Thermo Fisher Scientific
- Unilever (Miko)
- URW (Westfield)
- Vinci SA
- Viparis

== Broadcasting rights ==
In France, domestic rights to the 2024 Summer Olympics were owned by Warner Bros. Discovery (formerly Discovery Inc.) via Eurosport, with free-to-air coverage sublicensed to the country's public broadcaster France Télévisions. WBD networks broadcast from Hôtel Raphael, with dedicated studios for its British, French, Polish, and Nordic channels.

The official Olympics website offered both live-streaming and recent recordings of the events in selected markets, particularly in Brazil, Russia (due to Russian broadcasters pulling out), and the Indian subcontinent.

== Concerns and controversies ==
=== Lead-up ===
Several controversial issues occurred related to the 2024 Summer Olympics, including environmental and security concerns, human rights, terrorism, and controversies over allowing Israel to participate amidst the Gaza war, and allowing Russian and Belarusian athletes to compete as neutrals amidst the Russian invasion of Ukraine. While there was nominally an Olympic Truce in place as usual, the Russian invasion of Ukraine and the Gaza war set a more conflicted political background to the games, before considering domestic and sporting issues.

=== Opening ceremony ===
A portion of the opening ceremony of the Paris 2024 Olympics sparked significant controversy worldwide for its inclusion of a reenactment of the feast of the Gods, which depicts various Greek gods partaking in a banquet at Mount Olympus. The performance faced heavy backlash from Christian and conservative groups, who accused the performance representing the feast of Dionysus as mocking Leonardo da Vinci's The Last Supper.

The artistic director of the ceremony, Thomas Jolly, the ceremony's creative team, and many art historians later confirmed that the performance was unrelated to Leonardo da Vinci's The Last Supper. Jolly additionally later stated, "The idea was instead to have a grand pagan festival connected to the gods of Olympus, Olympism".

The Olympic World Library would later publish a media guide (written before the ceremony) describing it as being a homage to cultural festivities. According to Georgian fact checking website Myth Detector, many experts had pointed out the differences between The Last Supper fresco and the performance.

The performance, however, also received praise from others for "celebrating queer visibility and LGBTQ+ inclusivity", according to American magazine Cosmopolitan. Among those who expressed appreciation for the segment were American actress Jodie Sweetin, as well as Le Filip, a Croatian-French drag queen who won the third season of Drag Race France.

== See also ==
- Doping suspensions at Paris 2024
- 2024 Summer Paralympics
- 2028 Summer Olympics in Los Angeles
- 2032 Summer Olympics in Brisbane
- List of LGBTQ Summer Olympians (2024–present)
- Other Olympic Games celebrated in France
  - 1900 Summer Olympics and 1924 Summer Olympics also held in Paris
  - 1924 Winter Olympics – Chamonix
  - 1968 Winter Olympics – Grenoble
  - 1992 Winter Olympics – Albertville
  - 2030 Winter Olympics – French Alps
- List of IOC country codes

== Notes ==
Summer Olympics
Preceded by Tokyo	XXXIII Olympiad; Paris; 2024	Succeeded by Los Angeles
