= Terraillon =

Terraillon S.A.
- Industry: wholesale trade (business-to-business) of household appliances
- Founded: 1956; 70 years ago in Annemasse, France
- Founder: Paul Terraillon
- Headquarters: Croissy-sur-Seine
- Website: terraillon.com

Terraillon is a producer of household goods. Its products include consumer and medical weighing scales, consumer healthcare products and water filtration systems. The company was founded in Annemasse, France, in 1946 by Paul Terraillon. By the 1970s, it made up over 80% of the bathroom and kitchen scales market in France.

== History ==
The company was founded in the French Alpine town of Annemasse in 1946 by Paul Terraillon, a watch and clock maker. Terraillon adapted the skills used in clock-making to design kitchen weighing scales. He soon began manufacturing these kitchen scales in his workshop and in 1956, to cope with the rising demand, he incorporated his business and moved to a larger manufacturing facility.

By the 1970s, Terraillon S.A. made up over 80% of the bathroom and kitchen scales market and the company began to expand into the international market. Export sales were initially focused in Western Europe and some French overseas territories but in 1988, with the company's acquisition of Hanson, a major UK-based competitor, it inherited a network of importers and agents in over 80 countries. During the 1980s and early 1990s the company went through a turbulent transition from a family-owned manufacturing and engineering company to a more market-focussed company. During this time, the company was purchased by French tycoon Bernard Tapie, who lost the company to the Crédit Lyonnais bank.

By the mid 90s manufacturing had been outsourced and Terraillon began to specialize in innovation and design, while leveraging its distribution coverage, marketing skills and brand equity. This transition was completed with the MBI/MBO of the company in 1999, led by two Irish businessmen, Fergal Mulchrone and Chris Duggan, with the backing of a European venture capital fund managed by Hibernian Capital Partners for 33 million francs. In two years, the company began a period of growth, regaining European leadership of the consumer scales market, while also diversifying into healthcare products and water filtration. It was sold to Measurement Specialities for 125 million francs and then to the Japanese Fukuda. Terraillon opened several regional sales offices in Hong Kong, Germany, Italy, and Spain to cope with their international size.

Terraillon is now a global company, with 2 well-known brands, Terraillon and Hanson, and sales of over USD 50 million. It is part of an international holding group which incorporates its high-tech sensors division in France, manufacturing division in China and its regional sales and marketing offices in various international locations.

== See also ==
- Bernard Tapie
