= Harumi (disambiguation) =

Harumi is a Japanese given name.

Harumi may also refer to:

== Places ==
- Harumi, Tokyo, a district of Chūō, Tokyo
  - Harumi Futo, site of the 2020 Olympic Games village

== Fictional characters ==
- Harumi (Ninjago), a character in Ninjago
- Harumi Chono, a character in the anime series Paranoia Agent

== Music ==
- Harumi (album), a 1968 album by a musician of the same name

== See also ==
- Said al-Harumi (1972–2021), Israeli politician
