= Harumi =

- Pronunciation: Ha-ru-mi
- Gender: Unisex, predominantly female

Origin
- Origin: Japanese
- Meaning: It can have many different meanings depending on the kanji used.
- Region of origin: Japan

Other names
- Related names: Harue; Haruhi; Haruka; Haruko; Haruna; Haruno; Haruyo

Harumi (はるみ, ハルミ) is a Japanese given name. Although the name can be given to both sexes, it is more commonly used by females.

== Written forms ==
The meaning of Harumi is generally associated with "springtime beauty".

Harumi can be written using different kanji characters with the following meanings:

- 晴美, "sunny, beauty"
- 晴海, "sunny, sea"
- 晴実, "sunny, fruit"
- 春美, "spring, beauty"
- 春海, "spring, sea"
- 春実, "spring, fruit"
- 治美, "govern, beauty"

The name can also be written in hiragana or katakana.

== People ==
- Edo Harumi (エド・はるみ; born 1964), Japanese comedian, actress and graduate student
- Aisha Harumi Tochigi (杤木 愛シャ 暖望; born 1996), Japanese model and beauty pageant titleholder
- Harumi Fujita (藤田 晴美; born 1961), Japanese composer
- Harumi Fujita (archaeologist) (藤田 はるみ; born 1954), Japanese researcher of Mexican archaeology
- Harumi Hanayagi (花柳 はるみ; 1896–1962), Japanese film and stage actress
- Harumi Hiroyama (弘山 晴美; born 1968), Japanese long-distance runner
- Harumi Honda (本田 晴美; born 1963), Japanese former track cyclist
- Harumi Ikoma (生駒 治美; born 1970), Japanese voice actress and narrator
- Harumi Imai (今井 春美; born 1952), Japanese cross-country skier
- Harumi Inoue (井上 晴美; born 1974), Japanese actress, model and accomplished swimmer
- Harumi Kohara (鴻原 春美; born 1965), Japanese badminton player
- Harumi Kori (郡 晴己; born 1953), Japanese former football player and manager
- Harumi Kurihara (栗原 はるみ; born 1947), Japanese celebrity homemaker and television personality
- Harumi Minamino (南野 遥海; born 2004), Japanese footballer
- Harumi Miyako (都 はるみ; born 1948), Japanese enka singer
- Harumi Nakazato (中里 晴美; born 1962), Japanese sprint canoer
- Harumi Nemoto (根本 はるみ; born 1980), Japanese bikini model
- Harumi Osuzu (大鈴 はるみ; born 2000), Japanese member of the Kamen Joshi
- Harumi Sakurai (櫻井 浩美; born 1982), Japanese voice actress and narrator
- Harumi Sato (佐藤 晴美; born 1995), Japanese dancer, model and actress
- Harumi Takahashi (高橋 はるみ; born 1954), Japanese politician
- Harumi Tsuyuzaki (露崎 春女; born 1974), Japanese pop, R&B, and soul singer-songwriter
- Harumi Yanagawa (柳川 春己; born 1956), Japanese paralympic athlete
- Harumi Yoshida (吉田 晴美; born 1972), Japanese politician

== Places ==
- Harumi, district of Tokyo
