= Harue =

- Gender: Female

Origin
- Origin: Japanese
- Meaning: Different meanings depending on the kanji used

Harue (written: 春恵, 春詠, 春江, 治恵 or はる江) is a feminine Japanese given name. Notable people with the name include:

- Harue Akagi (赤木 春恵; born 1924), Japanese actress
- Harue Kitamura (北村 春江; born 1928), Japanese politician
- Harue Koga (古賀 春江; 1895–1933), Japanese avant-garde painter
- Harue Momoyama (桃山 晴衣; born 1939), Japanese singer-songwriter
- Harue Okitsu (沖津 はる江; born 1949), Japanese alpine skier
- Harue Oyama McVay (born 1920), American ceramist
- Harue Sato (佐藤 春詠; born 1976), Japanese footballer
- Harue Tanikawa (谷川 治恵; born 1954), Japanese shogi player
- Harue Tsutsumi (堤 春恵; born 1950), Japanese playwright
- Harue Yamashita (山下 春江; 1901–1985), Japanese politician

== Fictional characters ==
- Harue Akado (赤土 晴絵), a character in the manga series Saki: Achiga-hen - Episode of Side A
- Harue Shigima, a protagonist from Paranormasight: The Seven Mysteries of Honjo

== See also ==
- Harue, Fukui, a former town in Sakai District, Fukui Prefecture, Japan
- Harue Station, a railway station in Sakai, Fukui Prefecture, Japan
