= Haruhi =

- Pronunciation: Japanese: [haɾɯçi]
- Gender: Female

Origin
- Origin: Japanese
- Meaning: Spring day and has other meanings depending on the kanji.
- Region of origin: Japan

Haruhi (はるひ, ハルヒ) is a feminine Japanese given name that can be written with various kanji.

== Written forms ==
Haruhi can be written using different kanji characters and can mean:

- 春日, "spring day"
- 晴日, "clear day"
- 春陽, "spring sunshine"
- 春妃, "spring princess"
- 春姫, "spring princess"
- 遙日, "distant day"

The name can also be written in hiragana or katakana.

== People ==
- Haruhi (はるひ), a member of the rock band Doremidan
- Haruhi Aiso (晴日; born 1964), a Japanese singer-songwriter
- Moeka Haruhi (春日; born 1984), a Japanese professional wrestler
- Haruhi Nanao (はるひ; born 1973), a Japanese voice actress
- Haruhi Iuchi (井内 悠陽; born 2004), a Japanese actor

== Fictional characters ==
- Haruhi (ハルヒ), a character from the Global Garden manga series
- Haruhi Fujioka (ハルヒ), the main character of the Ouran High School Host Club series
- Haruhi Godo (春妃), a character from the film The Angel's Egg
- Haruhi Inohara (春陽), a character from the W Wish series
- Haruhi Kamisaka (春姫), a character from the Happiness! series
- Haruhi Suzumiya (ハルヒ), the title character of the Haruhi Suzumiya franchise
- Haruhi Teramitsu (遙日), a male character from the B-Project series

== See also ==
- Haruhi, Aichi, a former town in Nishikasugai District, Aichi, Japan
- Kasuga (disambiguation), which can be written with the same kanji as Haruhi (春日 Haruhi)
