= Paranormasight: The Mermaid's Curse =

Japanese visual novel released by Square Enix

- Developer: Xeen
- Publisher: Square Enix
- Directors: Takanari Ishiyama; Yoshihito Okuno
- Producers: Kazuma Oushu; Kazuhiro Kawakami
- Programmer: Naoki Takishita
- Artists: Junko Sumimizu; Gen Kobayashi
- Writer: Takanari Ishiyama
- Composer: Hidenori Iwasaki
- Engine: Unity
- Platforms: iOS; Windows; Android; Nintendo Switch
- Release: Switch, iOS, Android: WW: February 19, 2026; Windows: JP: February 20, 2026; WW: February 19, 2026
- Genre: Visual novel
- Mode: Single-player

Paranormasight: The Mermaid's Curse (Note: Japanese: パラノマサイト FILE38 伊勢人魚物語, Hepburn: Paranormasight FILE38 Ise Ningyo Monogatari) is a visual novel developed by Xeen and published by Square Enix for Android, IOS, Nintendo Switch, and Windows. The game was released on February 19, 2026. It is a sequel to the game Paranormasight: The Seven Mysteries of Honjo.

== Gameplay ==
Paranormasight: The Mermaid's Curse is a visual novel. Similar to its predecessor, it utilizes a multi-perspective flow-chart gameplay.

== Plot ==
Set in the 1980s in a fictionalized version of Kami-shima, Ise-Shima, Mie, Japan, named Kameshima. The plot is a coming-of-age story revolving around mermaids and immortality. The area, well rumored for its mermaid inhabitants, is befallen by a series of curses following the sight of Yuza Minakuchi's doppelgänger, attracting a girl of unknown origins, treasure hunters, and a housewife investigating a drowning. Through colliding paths, they become closer to the secret of the Mermaid of Ise. Characters from Paranormasight: The Seven Mysteries of Honjo are mentioned, however there is no substantial connection to the previous game outside of this.

== Development ==
Paranormasight: The Mermaid's Curse was developed by Xeen for Square Enix. The game was directed and written by Takanari Ishiyama.

== Release ==
Paranormasight: The Mermaid's Curse was revealed during the Nintendo Direct in February 2026. It was released on February 19, 2026, on iOS, Android, Windows and the Nintendo Switch. In Japan, the Windows edition followed the next day

== Reception ==
Reception

Aggregate scores
Aggregator	Score
Metacritic	(PC) 85/100 (NS) 83/100
OpenCritic	90% recommend

Review scores
Publication	Score
Game Informer	9/10
Nintendo Life	7/10
Nintendo World Report	9/10
RPGFan	88/100

The PC and Nintendo Switch versions of Paranormasight: The Mermaid's Curse both received generally favorable reviews from critics, according to the review aggregation website Metacritic. OpenCritic determined that 90% of critics recommend the game.

RPG Site's Josh Torres praised the story but argued that it was slightly weaker than its predecessor. Ollie Reynolds of Nintendo Life wrote that the story was slower initially but felt that it led to "a narrative that eventually feels more fleshed out and complete". Josh Broadwell of Polygon wrote that the game was "one of the most grounded, and well-written, visual novels out there". However, Torres and Reynolds noted that the game has fewer horror elements compared to its predecessor.

Reynolds wrote that the fishing minigame was a "a nice little detour from the lengthy dialogue sequences". Rollin Bishop of GamesRadar+ wrote of the minigame "If the developers had simply made a diving game, I'd probably happily spend dozens of hours exploring the sea floor."
