= Harumi Futo =

Residential area rejuvenated for the 2020 Olympic and Paralympic Games, Tokyo, Japan

Coordinates: 35.650361°N 139.774523°E

Harumi Futō is located in Harumi (晴海), an island district of Chūō, Tokyo (central Tokyo). 'Harumi' may mean sunny, spring or beauty, while 'futō' (埠頭) refers to coastline or pier. The harbour pier supports Harumi Terminal Park which berths cruise ships, and was part of an urban redevelopment project site associated with the 2020 Olympic Village.

== Neighbourhood ==
The locale was created as land reclamation from seabed fill.

The site was the intended place for an international exposition planned to coincide with the later-cancelled 1940 Summer Olympics. Helsinki, Finland, eventually hosted the 1952 Summer Olympics and Tokyo, the 1964 Summer Olympics.

The six-story Harumi Passenger Terminal was opened in 1991 for the fiftieth anniversary of the opening of the Port of Tokyo. The terminal building has an observation deck.

Harumifuto Park has a statue, with views to the large artificial island of Odaiba, and the Rainbow Bridge.

The area is serviced by the Kachidoki Station (勝どき駅 Kachidoki-eki) subway station (E17) on the Toei Oedo Line, and the Shijō-mae Station (市場前駅, Shijōmae-eki) subway station (U14) on the Yurikamome Line.

By August 2022, the former Olympic and Paralympic Village site became known as 'Harumi Flag', Tokyo's largest public-private housing development.

== Olympic Games 2020 Village ==
Determined as the site for an Olympic Village to accommodate competitors, team staff, and sports officials, it hosted up to 10,000 Olympic and 4,000 Paralympic athletes. The Harumi 5-chōme 44 hectares (110 acres) neighbourhood complex was closed to the public during the two events. At least one Paralympic sport accommodated the sports officials separate to the Village (and satellite villages) due to commuting delay concerns to the sporting venue.

The Village could cater for about 2000 visiting guests and media, and 8000 Games staff, per day. The athletes village mayor was 84-year-old Olympian and former Japan Football Association president Saburo Kawabuchi.

The Village formed the centre of an 'infinity' symbol between the 'Heritage' and 'Tokyo Bay' themed competition zones. Twenty-one residential buildings were built, totalling 5,650 units. Buildings ranged from 14 to 18 stories, total costing estimated to be ¥207 billion (about 2 billion USD). It had three types of apartments:

- 60 square metres (650 sq ft) apartments to house four athletes;
- 104 square metres (1,120 sq ft) apartments to house seven people;
- 135 square metres (1,450 sq ft) apartments to house eight people, with three bathrooms.

Beds were constructed out of cardboard, holding a weight up to 200 kilograms (440 lb). Supplying 18,000 bed for the Olympic Games and 8,000 beds for the Paralympic Games, the beds and mattresses were to be recycled into other products after the events.

Part of the Village included a food hall. Following a contest of over 700 submitted recipes and as part of a Japanese flavour, additional to other provided menus, athletes could select one of five special dishes involving cold sōmen noodles, oden served as a chilled soup, Hokkaido's zangi deep-fried salmon, a toasted bread, and dessert 'zunda de panna cotta' from north-eastern Japan.

Self-driving buses, such as the Toyota e-Palette, were used for predetermined routes around the Village. On 26 August 2021 one vehicle was alleged to have injured a judo Paralympian, causing the athlete to withdraw from competition.

Some of the units were to be sold post-events to establish a new community as part of 'model plan of the after-use of the Olympic Village/Paralympic Village', more than 4000 condominiums with city views, some to be priced at ¥170 million (€1.4 million). Two fifty-story residential skyscrapers were to be built post-event, resulting a total of twenty-three tower blocks. A school and fire station were also later planned.

There were two satellite villages:

- Sailing Village: Ōiso Prince Hotel, Ōiso-machi, Kanagawa Prefecture, for competitions at Enoshima Yacht Harbour;
- Cycling Village: Laforet Shuzenji, Izu, Shizuoka, for competitions at Izu Velodrome.

=== Village plaza ===
Within the Village was a plaza with a general store, café, and media centre. Operation BATON (Building Athletes' Village with Timber Of the Nation) saw the plaza structure made of 40,000 pieces of donated wood to demonstrate sustainability, and later the woods were to be returned to municipalities for reuse in local facilities.

=== Coronavirus responses ===
As part of the COVID-19 response, a taskforce planned to reduce the impact on Chūō ward’s public health centre by establishing a special health facility dedicated to infectious diseases; separate to mandatory testing including body temperatures, and using Japan's 'COCOA' (COntact-COnfirming Application) contact tracing mobile app.

In mid-November 2020, it was indicated to reduce the risks of coronavirus transmission and infection, late-night social parties that form part of Village life would not be supported, athletes would be encouraged to stay within the Village and not go sightseeing around Tokyo, and to enter and remain in the Village only for the duration of the sport and then leave Japan rather than stay for the entire duration of the Games itself. A COVID-19 code of conduct would be impressed on the athletes. The just-announced vaccines would not be an entry requirement to the Games.

While capable of accommodating 16,500 persons, the changes would mean only 6,000 to 7,000 people in the Village at any one time, with diminishing numbers as athletes depart after their sport. Athlete numbers within the dining hall would be limited (as well as limited to thirty minutes for breakfast and one hour for lunch and dinner, with food menus received on cellphones). The dining hall, normally able to seat 4,500 people at one time, would now require athletes to dine alone, maintain physical distancing, and to wipe down surfaces after eating. With a reduction in spectators and athletes, a concern was expressed as to whether halal food supply could be sustained within the Village and the Games themselves. Masks were to be worn at all times other than when eating.

In February 2021, with a revision in April 2021, the Olympic and Paralympic organisations released a series of 'playbooks' to govern how participants' lives were to be conducted in a health-safe way during the Games, and within the Village. With some Japanese surveys indicating over 80% wanted the Games deferred or cancelled over virus concerns, low vaccination rates in the nation, and a fourth wave of infections, International Olympic Committee president Thomas Bach sought to assure people on 19 May 2021, stating it was expected at least 80% of Village residents would be vaccinated before arrival, and a willingness to send in extra medical personnel to the Games and Village.

A post-event review using genomic sequencing data confirmed there was no spread of the coronavirus between Games participants and the local population. Only 33 positive cases were detected among 11,300 athletes.

=== Concerns generally ===
With the impact of the COVID-19 pandemic deferring the 2020 Olympic and Paralympic Games by twelve months, there were calls for the Olympic Village to be temporarily used as a homeless shelter. With the Games' deferment, concerns were raised that some of the properties had already been sold to developers, and units sold to owners who were set to move in after the September 2020 event conclusion. In February 2021, over twenty-four apartment owners commenced legal action for compensation due to the event's postponement, many having been required to take out a loan for the new apartment as the old apartment had been sold.

=== Post-Games period ===
By December 2021, developers were being sued for delays in handing over the condominiums, where apartments were priced between ¥49 million (€0.37 million) and ¥229 million (€1.8 million).

The post-event apartment supply was estimated as 30% annual supply of all of Tokyo's wards, and this might have been greater than could be accommodated by the market. Being not new, the properties might not sell at a premium price. Limited transport options might also reduced desirability as a new residential area.

By mid-August 2022 the former Olympic and Paralympic village was to welcome its new residents as its post-Games legacy, the site also being named 'Harumi Flag'.

== See also ==
- 2020 Summer Olympics
- 2020 Summer Paralympics
- Toyosu Market in adjacent Kōtō ward
