= Mio Kurosuzu =

Paranormasight character

- Paranormasight character
- Mio in Paranormasight
- First appearance: Paranormasight: The Seven Mysteries of Honjo (2023)
- Created by: Takanari Ishiyama
- Designed by: Gen Kobayashi

In-universe information
- Nationality: Japanese

Mio Kurosuzu is a character in the 2023 video game Paranormasight: The Seven Mysteries of Honjo. She is a high school student and an assistant to the police who investigates supernatural incidents. The game has multiple character perspectives where Mio is involved, though she mainly appears as a counterpart to another high school girl named Yakko Sakazaki. She was designed to be chubby to make her cute, as well as make her a "sedate psychic." Yakko's design and personality were created to contrast with Mio's, making her appearance thin and tall and personality a "trueborn Tokyoite." She has received positive reception, regarded as one of the best characters in the game due to her design, psychic abilities, personality, and relationship with Yakko. She appeared in the manga sequel as its protagonist.

== Concept and creation ==
Mio Kurosuzu was created for Paranormasight: The Seven Mysteries of Honjo by the game's writer Takanari Ishiyama, and her design was created by the game's character designer, Gen Kobayashi. Paranormasight is set in the Shōwa era, and characters' clothing, including Mio's, were designed with the era in mind. She is a chubby girl who wears schoolgirl clothing typical of the Shōwa era in Japan and assists the police in spiritual investigations. She also wears a talisman as a hair clip. According to Ishiyama, she was given a chubby design because he believed it would look cute. She was intentionally designed to have more symbolism in her appearance without having so much that it would feel out of place. Ishiyama described her as someone who typically does not want to have people see her hand gestures or purification of spirits, thus typically having a calm expression he says conveys "I'm hungry" despite her illustrations tending to have a serious expression. Her name takes from the name of the protagonist of the manga Eko Eko Azarak.

Each starring character in Paranormasight has a companion character, with Mio being the companion to Yakko Sakazaki. When designing the duo, Ishiyama conceived the idea of a "gloomy spiritual girl and a cheerful Edokko girl as young people who can confront paranormal phenomena." He considered the duo as a yin-yang pairing, stating he believed they would be a strong enough duo to justify a spinoff starring them. The profiles for the two called for a "sedate psychic" and "trueborn Tokyoite" respectively. To contrast with Mio's chubby design, Yakko was made tall and thin, with the staff that their distinct personalities called for distinct physical differences. Design staff noted that the game being played in the first-person perspective made it "lonely," and gave companion characters like Mio stronger personalities. Ishiyama noted that, despite him expecting Mio to become popular, others in the team found that sentiment confusing.

== Appearances ==
Mio appears in Paranormasight, taking place in 1980s Honjo, as a companion character to Yakko Sakazaki, who has experienced a supernatural experience after doing a seance with Mio to commune with a dead schoolmate. This event coincided with a conspiracy to amplify paranormal events, surrounding seven mysteries associated with the Honjo area. A recent transfer to Yakko's school, Mio is later revealed to have experience with the supernatural, working with the police to help investigate paranormal matters. She also assists Yakko with her struggles with the ghost of the dead schoolmate, including helping the spirit find peace. She cooperates with other characters during the events of the game, including detectives Tetsuo Tsutsumi and Jun Erio.

A manga sequel to Paranormasight was released, starring Mio and featuring other characters from the game as supporting characters.

== Reception ==
Mio has received generally positive reception, identified as "undoubtedly one of the best leading eight characters" of the game by GamesRadar+ writer Hirun Cryer and one of RPG Site writer Josh Torres' favorite characters in the game. In a fan survey performed by Famitsu, Mio was voted the best character in the game, with readers identifying her cute, chubby appearance in conjunction with her strong psychic abilities for why they enjoy her so much. Her relationship with Yakko was also received well, with Famitsu writer Ma-san enjoying Mio's role and finding their portion of the game to be a highlight. Fellow Famitsu writer Kawachi enjoyed the duo of Mio and Yakko, finding Mio's design cute. Kawachi felt that Mio's design would not have appeared in Kobayashi's previous work, Schoolgirl Strikers, noting that her personality was cute and appreciating the contrast in height between her and Yakko. Destructoid writer Zoey Handley identified her as her favorite new character of 2023, noting that despite being a supporting character in Yakko's character, Mio "easily overshadows her." She appreciated that, despite her not being directly involved in the main conflict of the story, she involves herself due to her curiosity. She also praised the way she interacts with adults in a blunt matter, finding it made Mio stick with her well after the game ended. In a Dengeki Online article, Ma-san expressed hope to the developer that a sequel would star Mio, stating that she was popular with players. Speaking of Ishiyama's comment about the confusion around expecting Mio to be popular, they felt it made sense, stating that Shōwa era clothes and hairstyles for girls were plain.
