= Haruyo =

- Gender: Female

Origin
- Origin: Japanese
- Meaning: Different meanings depending on the kanji used

Haruyo (written: 春代, 春世 or 陽世) is a feminine Japanese given name. Notable people with the name include:

- Haruyo Ichikawa (市川 春代; 1913–2004), Japanese actress and singer
- Haruyo Morita (森田 春代), Japanese artist
- Haruyo Shimamura (島村 春世; born 1992), Japanese volleyball player
- Haruyo Yamaguchi (山口 陽世; born 2004), Japanese member of the Hinatazaka46
