= Kasuga-taisha =

Shinto shrine in Nara

Kasuga-taisha 春日大社
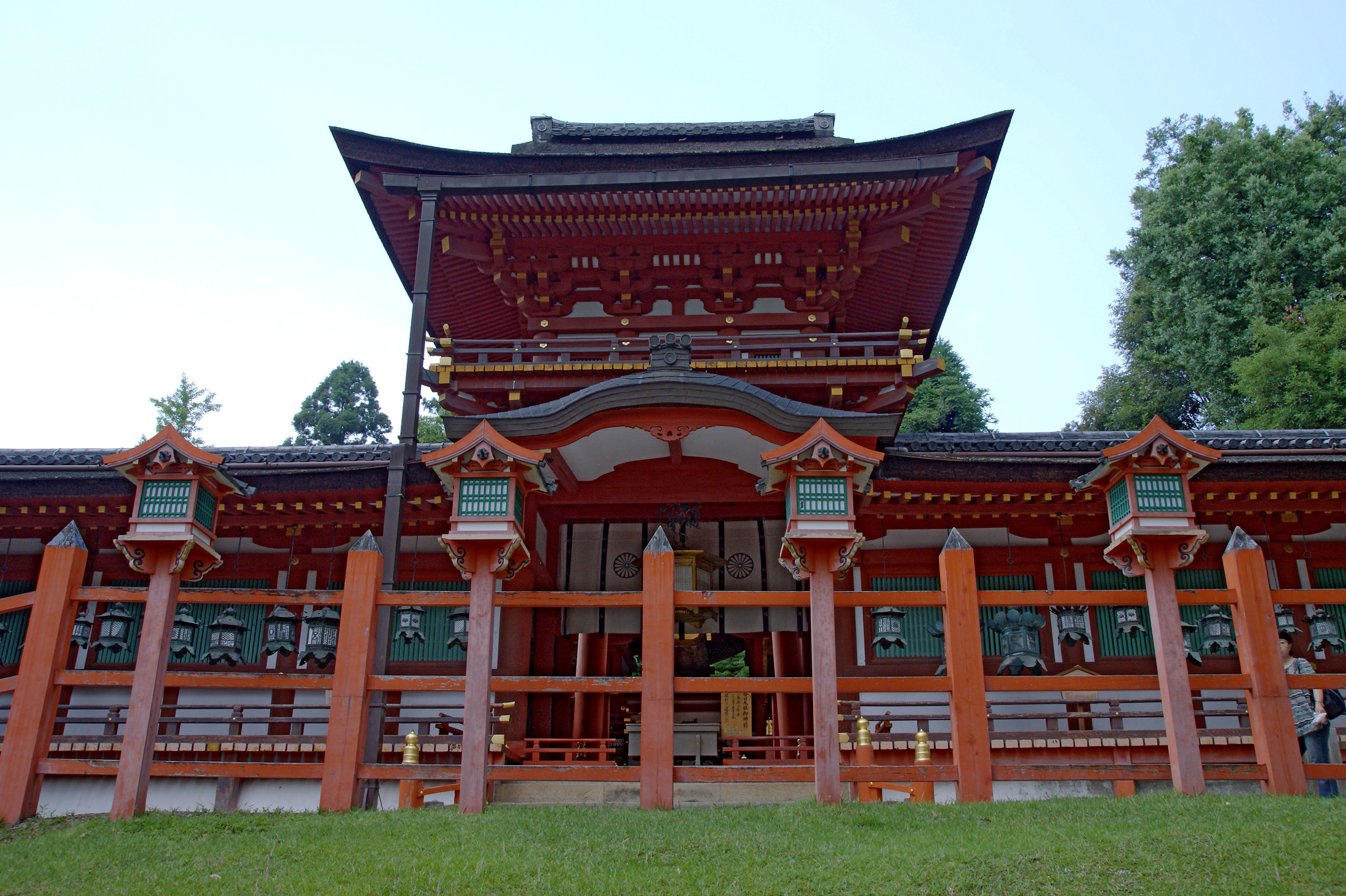
- The middle gate and hall

- Location within Japan

Religion
- Affiliation: Shinto
- Deity: Takemikazuchi-o; Futsunushi; Ame no Koyane; Himegami; Ame-no-Oshikumone
- Festivals: Kasuga-no-matsuri (Kasuga-sai: 春日祭) (13 March)
- Type: Twenty-Two Shrines; Chokusaisha; Beppyo jinja, Shikinaisya; Former kanpeitaisha

Location
- Location: 160 Kasugano-chō, Nara-shi, Nara-ken
- Coordinates: 34°40′53″N 135°50′54″E

Architecture
- Style: Kasuga-zukuri
- Established: 768

Website
- www.kasugataisha.or.jp

Kasuga-taisha (春日大社) is a Shinto shrine in Nara, Nara Prefecture, Japan. It is the shrine of the Fujiwara family, established in 768 CE and rebuilt several times over the centuries. The interior is famous for its many bronze lanterns, as well as the many stone lanterns that lead up to the shrine.

The architectural style Kasuga-zukuri takes its name from Kasuga Shrine's honden (sanctuary). The Torii at Kasuga-taisha is one of the oldest in Shinto and helped influence the style of Torii seen across much of Japan. Kasuga Shrine, and the Kasugayama Primeval Forest near it, are registered as a UNESCO World Heritage Site as part of the "Historic Monuments of Ancient Nara".

The path to Kasuga Shrine passes through a deer park. In the park, deer are able to roam freely and are believed to be sacred messengers of the Shinto gods that inhabit the shrine and surrounding mountainous terrain. Kasuga Shrine and the deer have been featured in several paintings and works of art of the Nanboku-chō period. Over three thousand stone lanterns line the way. The Man'yo Botanical Garden is adjacent to the shrine.

== History ==
=== Origin ===
The birth of this shrine, according to legend, began when the first kami of Kasuga-taisha, Takemikazuchi, rode on the back of a white deer to the top of Mount Mikasa in 768 CE. This kami is said to have traveled from the Kashima Jingu Shrine in order to protect Nara. The shrine location first received favor from the Imperial government in the Nara period as a result of the power from the Fujiwara family, as well as Empress Shōtoku.

From 1871 through 1946, Kasuga Shrine was officially designated one of the Kanpei-taisha (官幣大社), meaning that it stood in the first rank of government supported shrines.

== Religious significance ==
The four main kami enshrined here are Ame-no-Koyane, Himegami, Futsunushi, and Takemikazuchi. Though these are the primary divine beings of Kasuga-taisha, they are often grouped together as a combined deity known as Kasuga Daimyōjin. This multifaceted kami served as a template for worshipers who wanted to pray to multiple deities at once.

Kasuga Daimyōjin consists of five divine beings, each understood according to the honji suijaku theory. Honji suijaku identifies Buddhist divinities with kami counterparts, an innovative interpretation of indigenous practice with Buddhism. The fifth deity, Ame-no-Oshikumone, was added much later and is said to be the divine child of Ame no koyane and Himegami.

== Architecture ==
The architectural style of Kasuga-taisha comes from the name of its main hall (honden) known as Kasuga-zukuri. The shrine complex is protected by four cloisters and contains a main sanctuary, treasure house, several different halls, and large gates. One beautiful aspect of this shrine is the many wisteria trees known as "Sunazuri-no-Fuji" that bloom in late April and early May. This shrine is also home to over 3,000 lanterns which are made of either stone or bronze. An entire hall is devoted to them, known as Fujinami-no-ya Hall, but the lanterns are only lit during the Setsubun Mantoro and Chugen Mantoro festivals.

The four main kami each have a shrine devoted to them which are all in the same architectural style. They are characterized by sloping gabled roofs, a rectangular structure, katsuogi (decorative logs), and chigi (forked roof structures). The first hall established is dedicated to Takemikazuchi no mikoto, the second to Futsunushi no mikoto, the third to Amenokoyane no mikoto, and the final hall is attributed to the consort, Himegami. Several auxiliary shrines lie outside the main sanctuary that are dedicated to lesser kami. One is allotted to Tsunofuri no kami, that is commonly known as Tsubakimoto Jinja Shrine or Kayabusa Myojin. Kasenomiya Jinja Shrine is attributed to Shinatsuhiko no mikoto and Shinatsuhime who are kami of the winds. Wakamiya Jinja Shrine, created in 1135 CE, is one of the more prominent auxiliary shrines because it houses the kogami, or offspring kami called Ame no Oshikumono no mikoto. The primary worship here revolves around vengeful gods, and the dead and is the location of the Kasuga Wakamiya festival.

The Treasure House at this shrine contains hundreds of national treasures as well as many other cultural properties, most of which are from the Heian period. Some of the most noteworthy items that reside here are ornate taiko drums used in gagaku from the Kamakura period, arrows with crystal whistles from the Heian period, and bronze mirrors of the Heian and Nanboku-chō periods.

Kasuga-taisha, like Ise Grand Shrine and Izumo-taisha, continues the tradition of shikinen zōtai (式年造替), the regular rebuilding of shrines. This is a tradition based on the tokowaka (常若) concept of Shinto, in which objects are renewed in order to keep their divine prestige in pursuit of eternity. Like the Ise Grand Shrine, Kasuga-taisha has been rebuilding its shrines to the same specifications every 20 years for more than 1000 years since the Nara period, with the most recent reconstruction being the 60th rebuilding in 2016.

== Festivals ==
During the festivals of Setsubun Mantoro (February 3) and Chugen Mantoro (August 14–15), three thousand shrine lanterns are all lit at once. The Setsubun Mantoro refers to the celebration of the seasonal shift from winter to spring while the Chugen Mantoro relates to the transition of summer to fall. They both take place in order to celebrate the Obon and Setsubun holidays in Japanese culture. At Kasuga Grand shrine, people are seen writing and attaching their wishes, or ema, to the lanterns before lighting them during both festivals. Additionally, it is said that tossing dried beans at these times will ward off bad luck in the future.

March 13 is the Kasuga Matsuri, a local festival which features the dances of gagaku and bugaku. Shinto women perform traditional Japanese Yamato-mai dances that date back to the Nara and Heian periods. This festival also holds a horse celebration which consists of a parade through the streets by a "sacred" horse. One will see people dressed in traditional costumes of the Heian to Edo periods and can experience authentic kagura dance displays with dengaku music.

The Kasuga Wakamiya Festival takes place at the Wakamiya Jinja shrine from December 15 to 18th each year. The main goal of this gathering was to ward off disease while promoting new growth for the spring. Like Kasuga Matsuri, attendants can see kagura performances along with a procession in traditional attire.

== Kasugayama Primeval Forest ==
Kasugayama Primeval Forest is primeval forest of about 250 hectares (620 acres) near the summit of Kasugayama (498 metres (1,634 ft)), and contains 175 kinds of trees, 60 bird types, and 1,180 species of insects. In this area adjacent to Kasuga Grand Shrine, hunting and logging have been prohibited since 841 CE. Because Kasugayama has long been tied to Kasuga Grand Shrine worship, it is regarded as a sacred hill. The forest backdrop of the Kasuga Grand Shrine's buildings today has been unchanged since the Nara period.

== Images ==
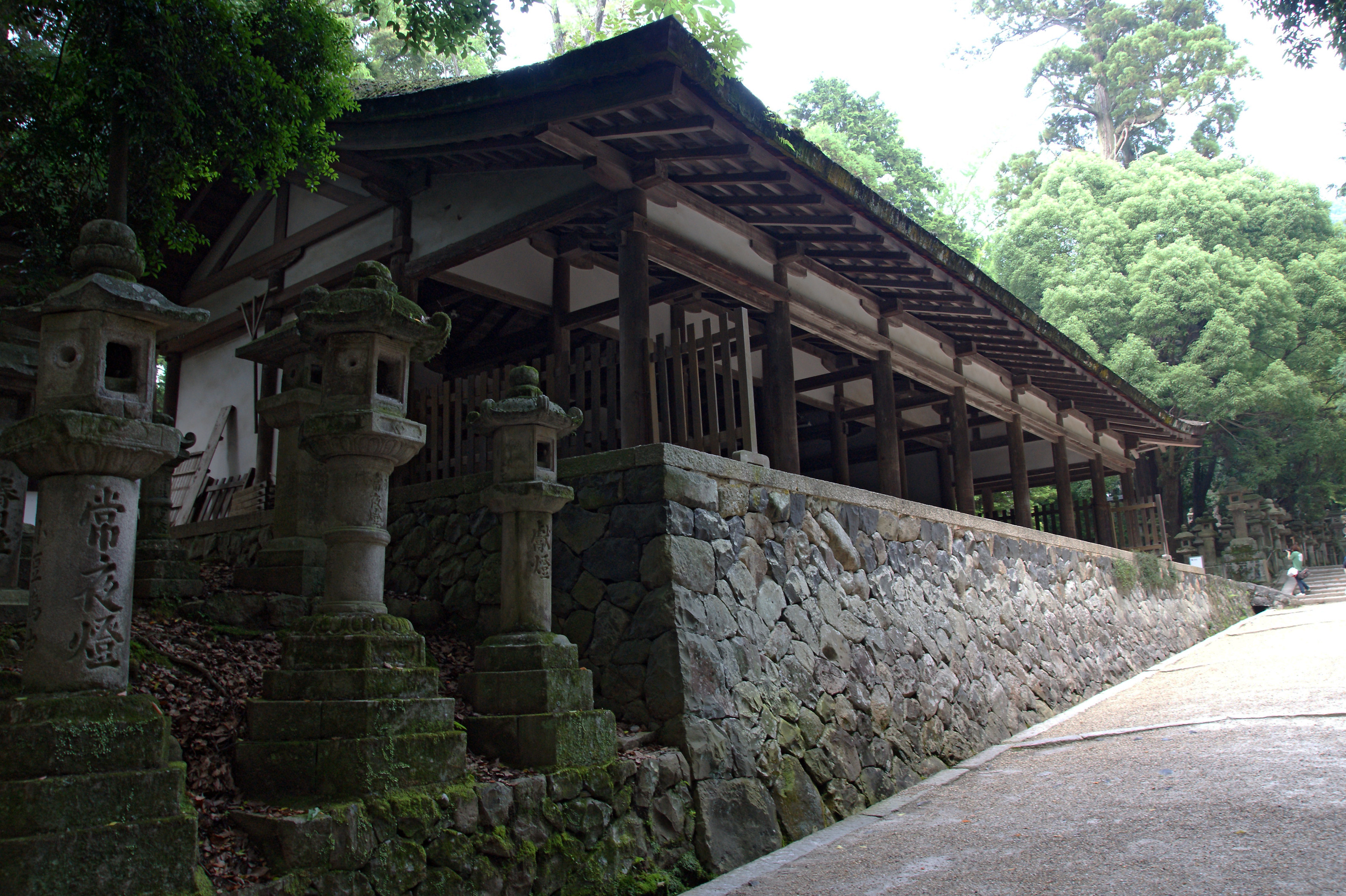
Chakutoden

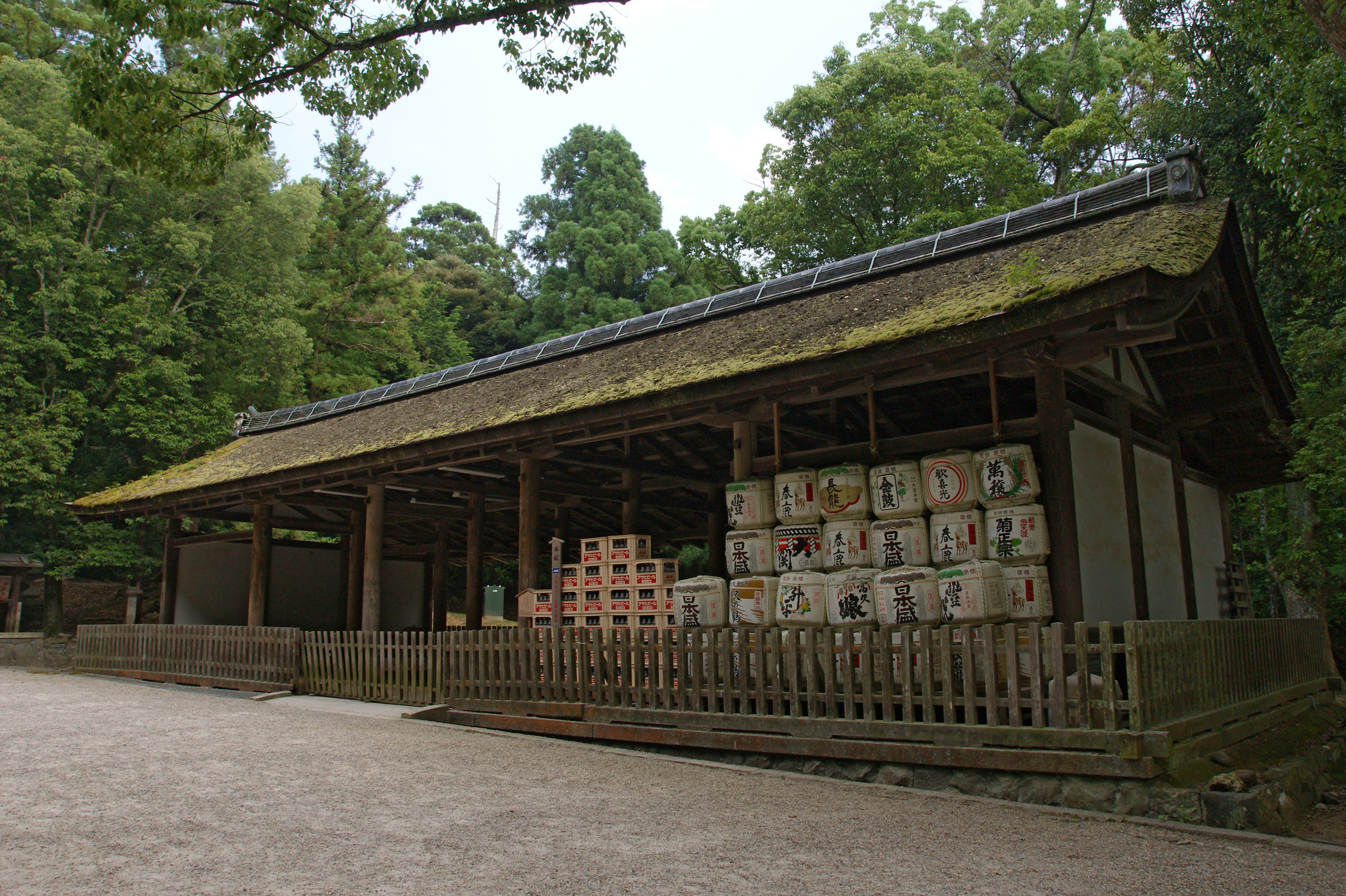
Kurumayadori

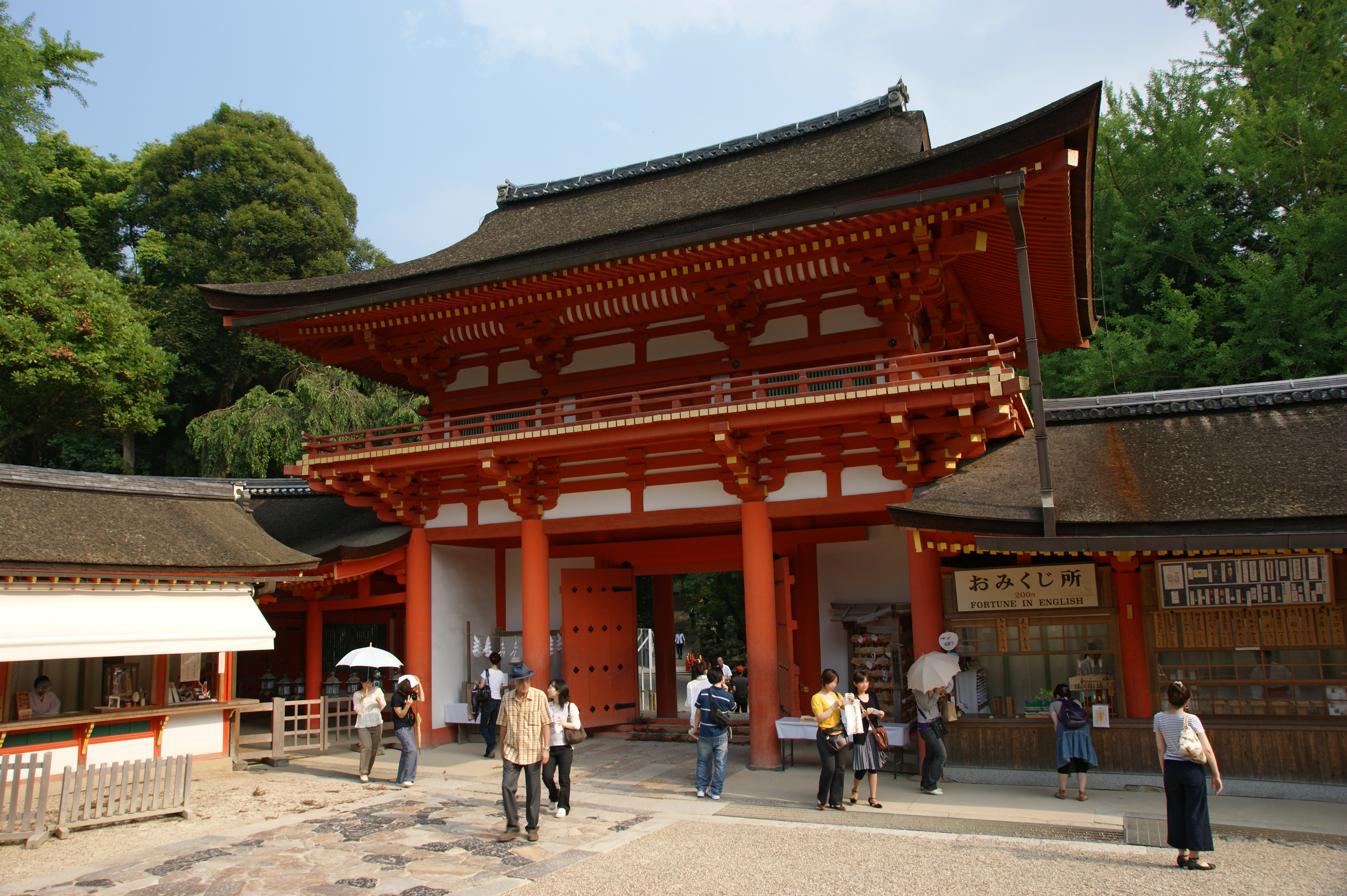
Minamimon

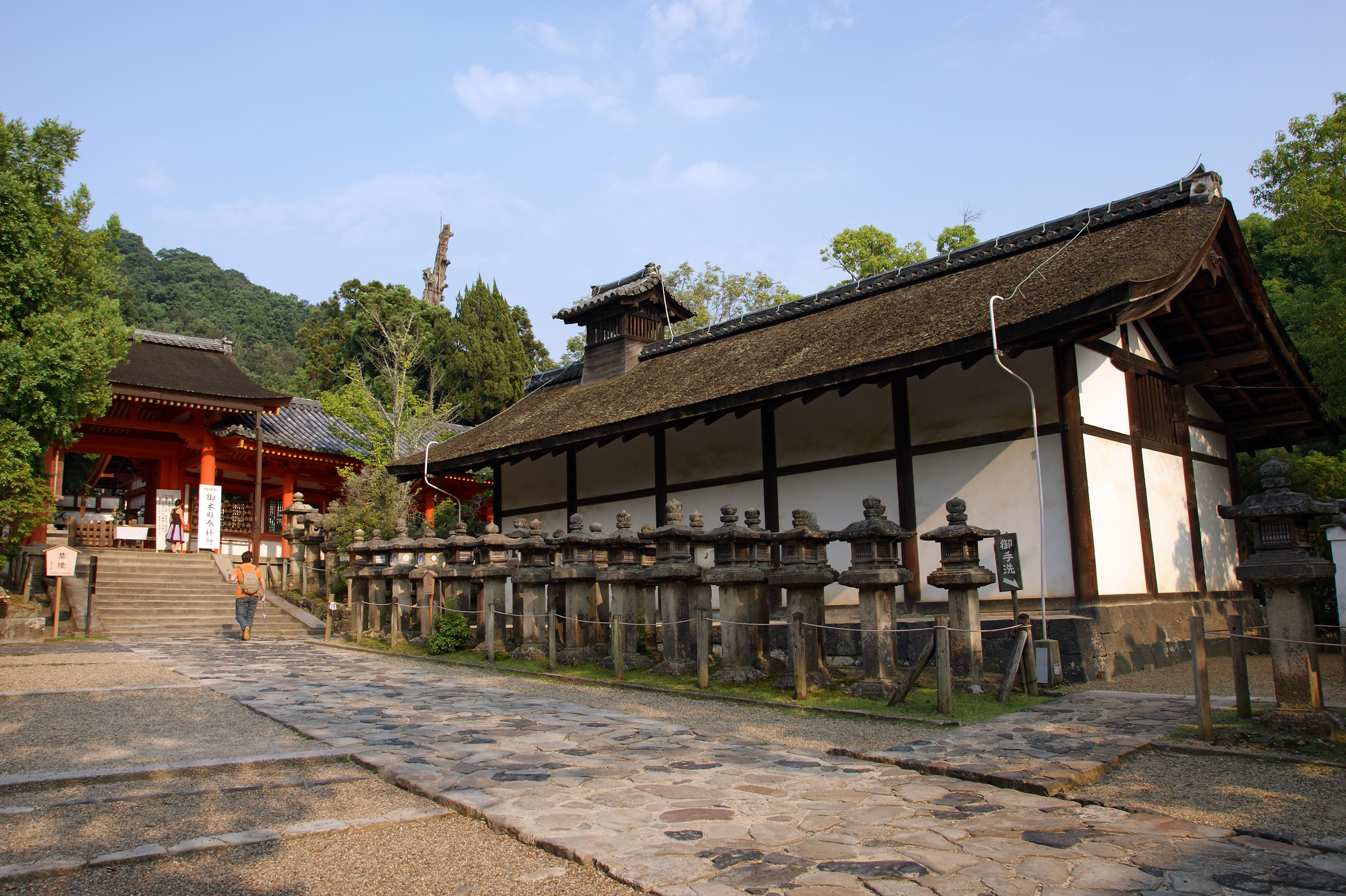
Sakadono

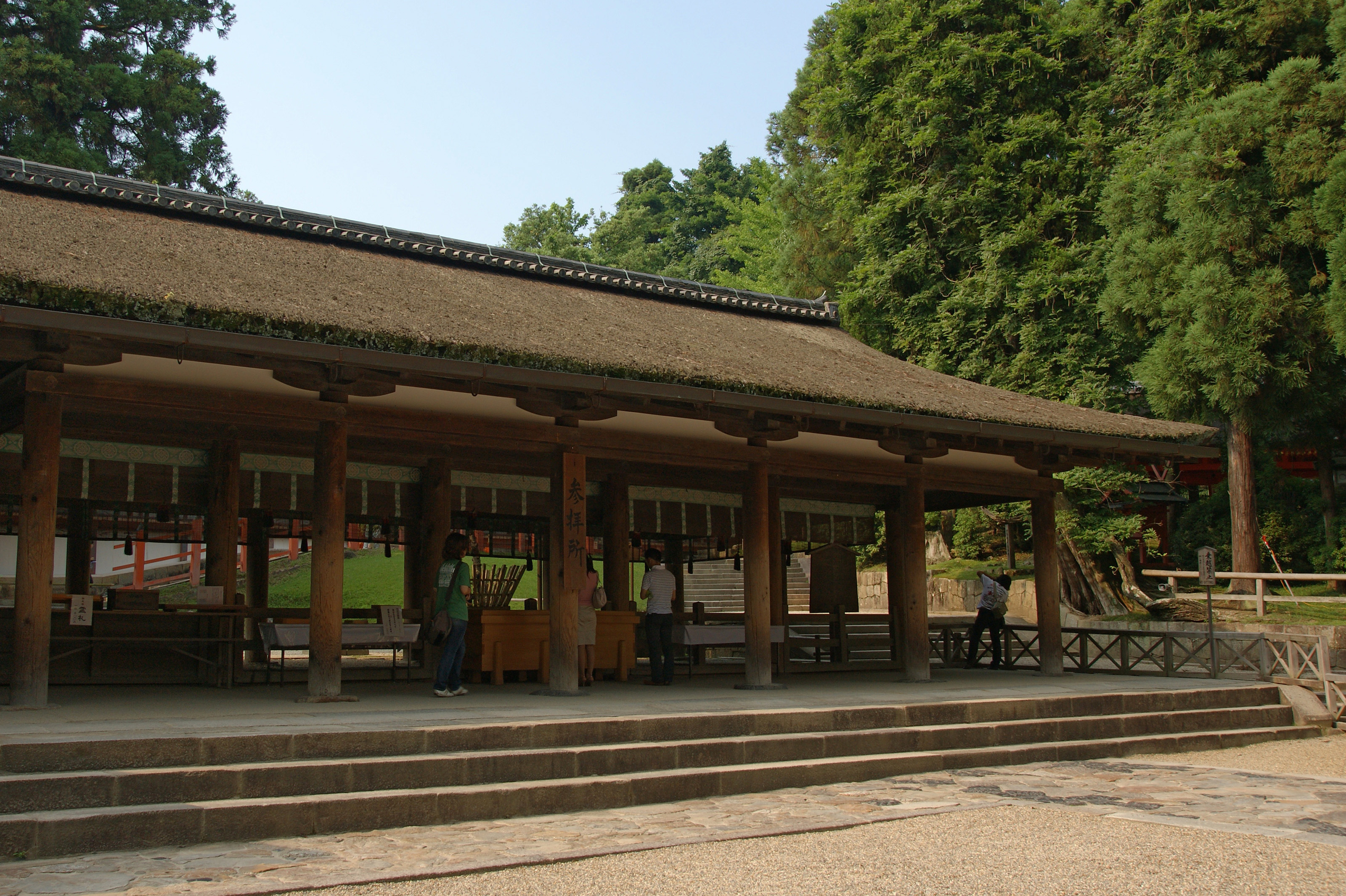
Heiden, Buden

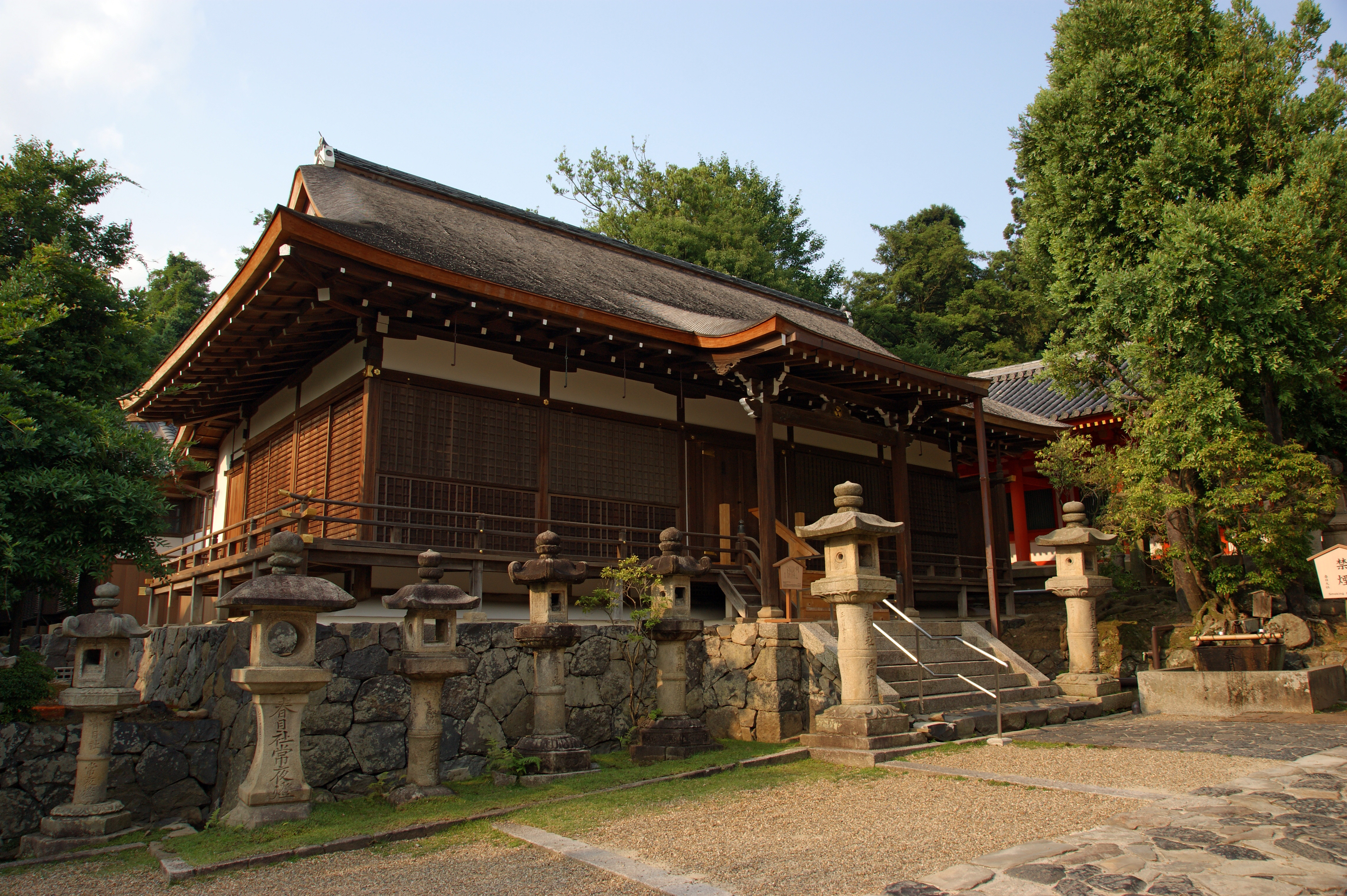
Keishoden

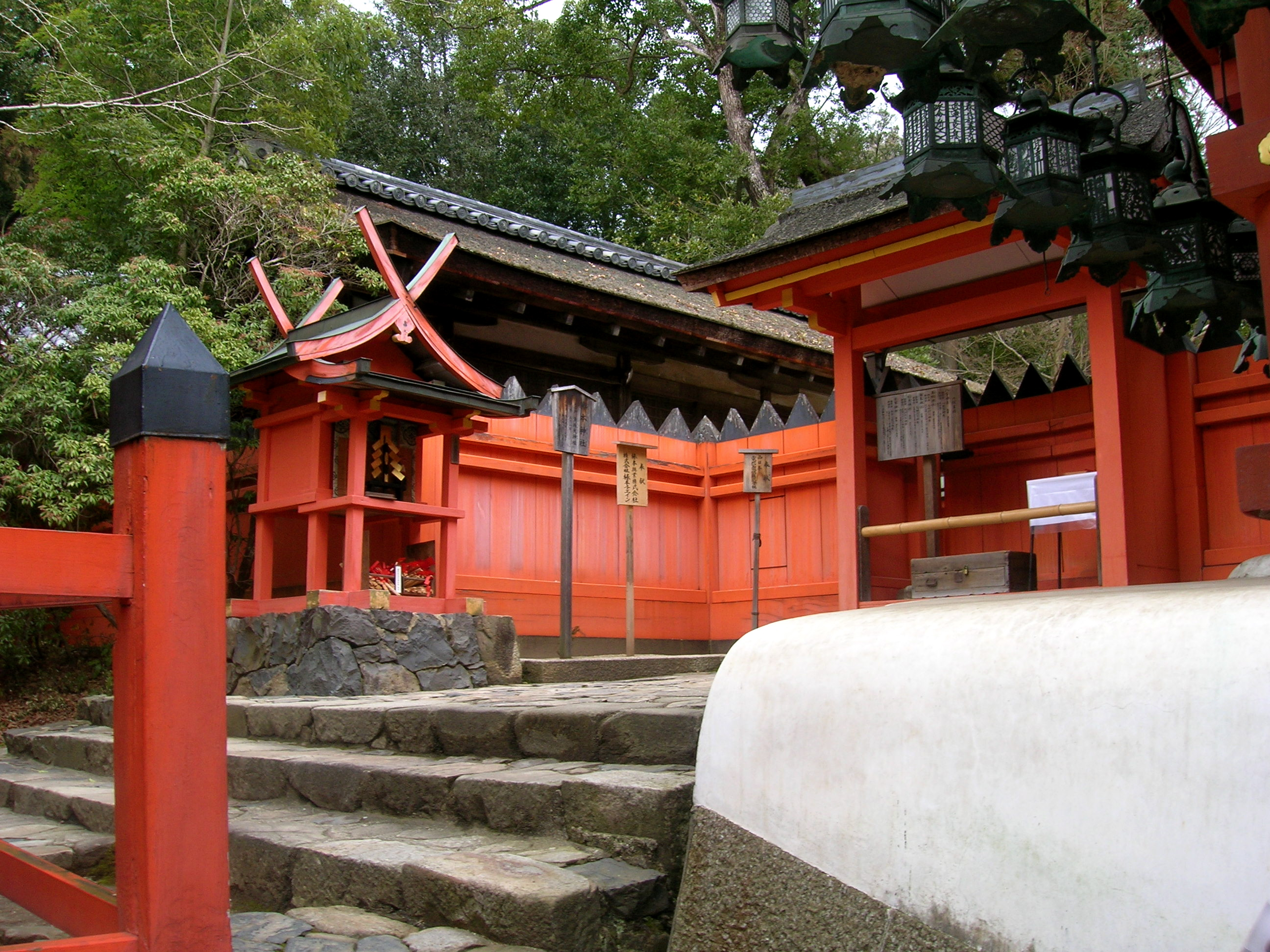
A smaller enclave

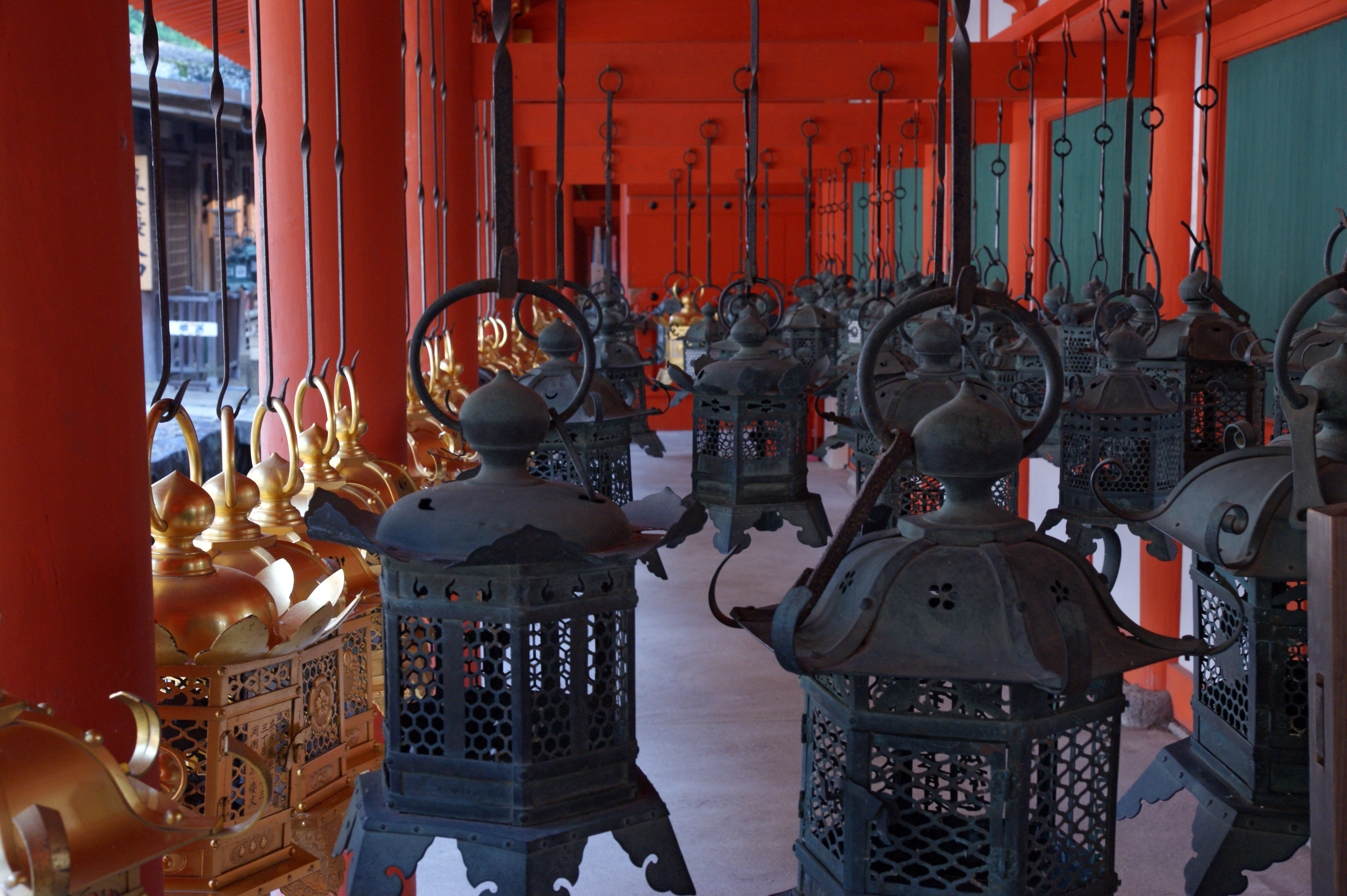
Lanterns

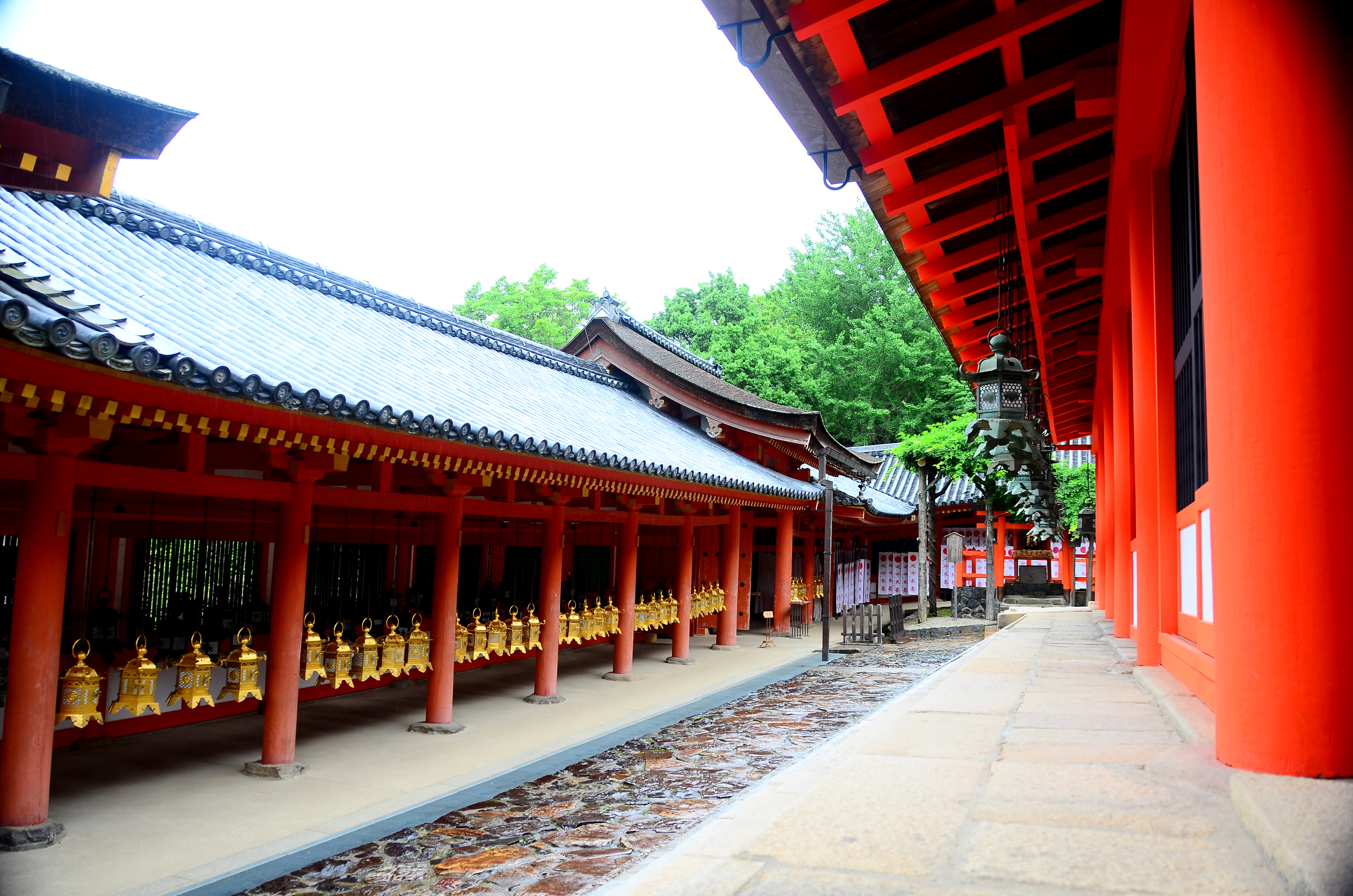
Corridors in the shrine complex

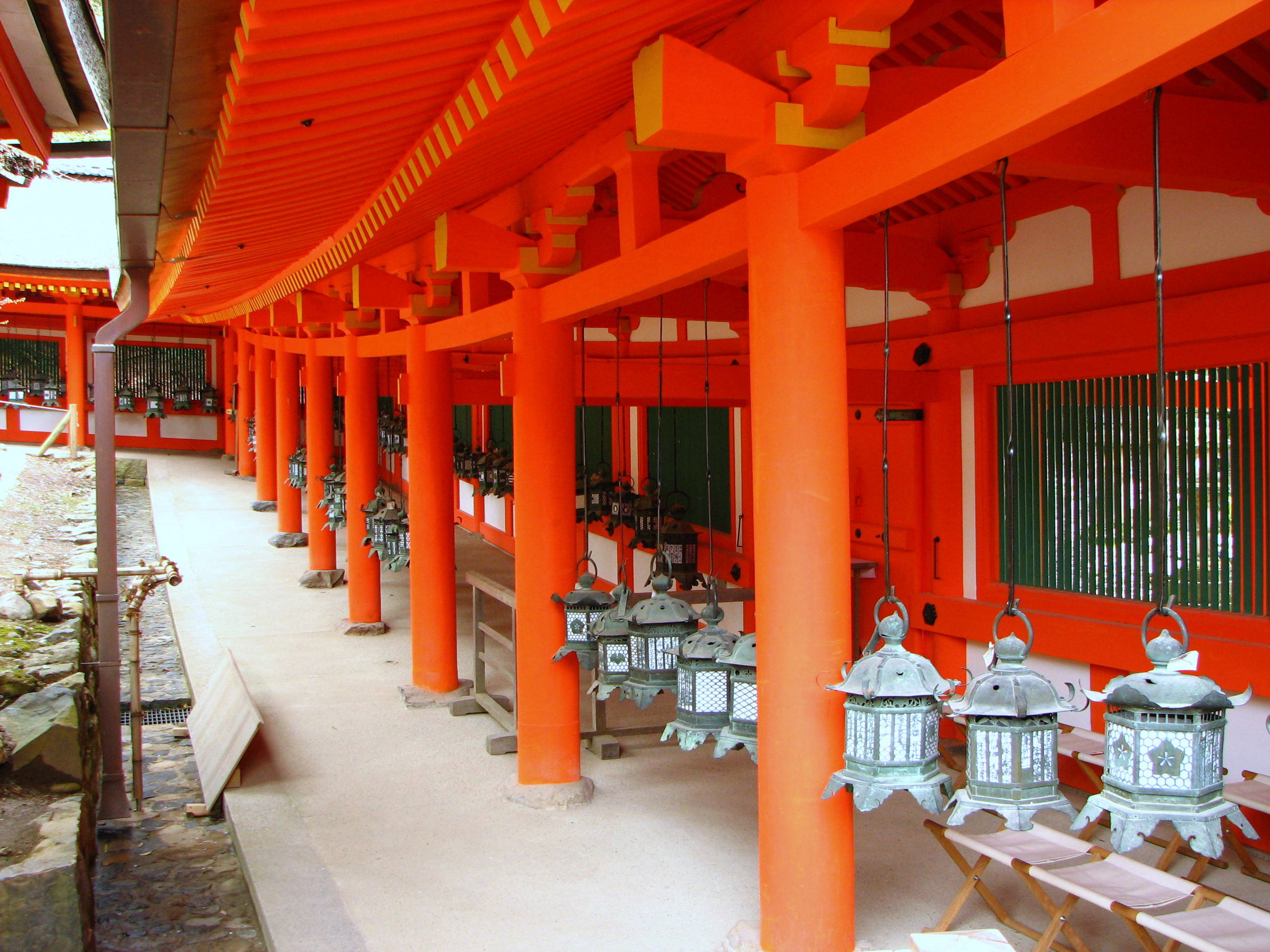
Lanterns

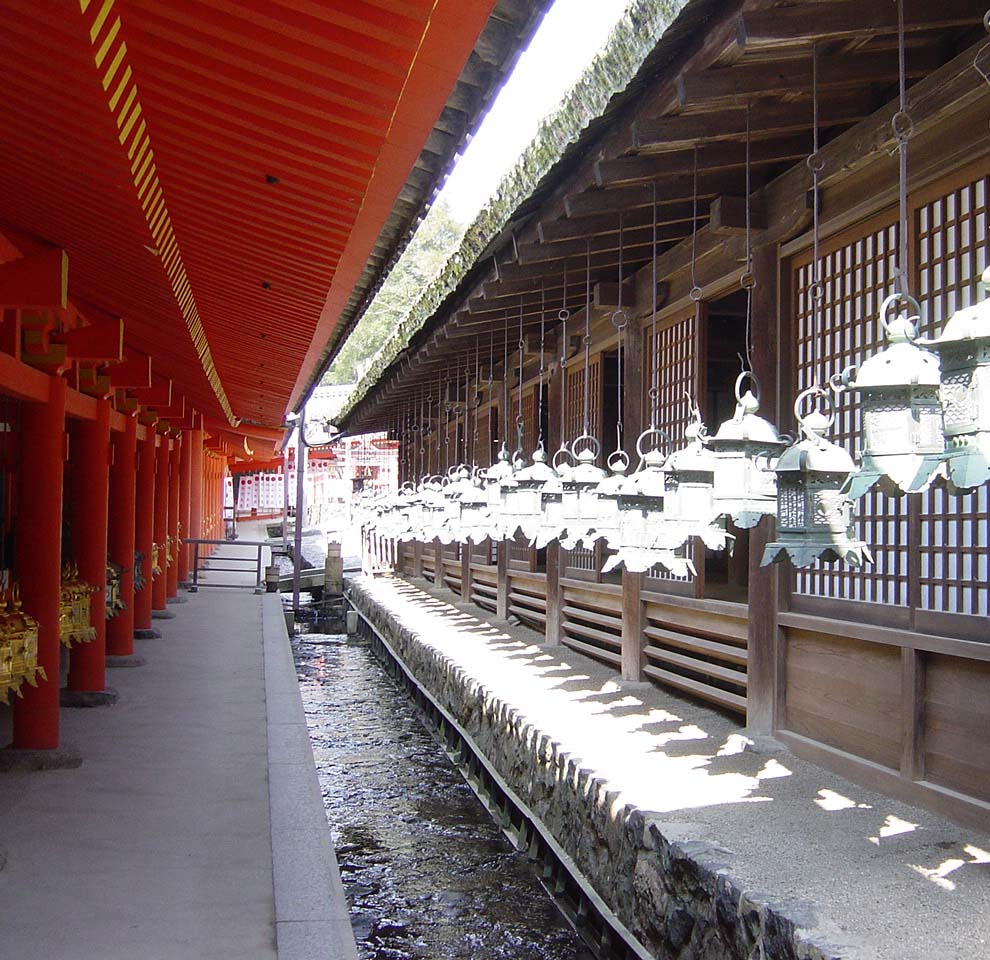
Bronze lanterns

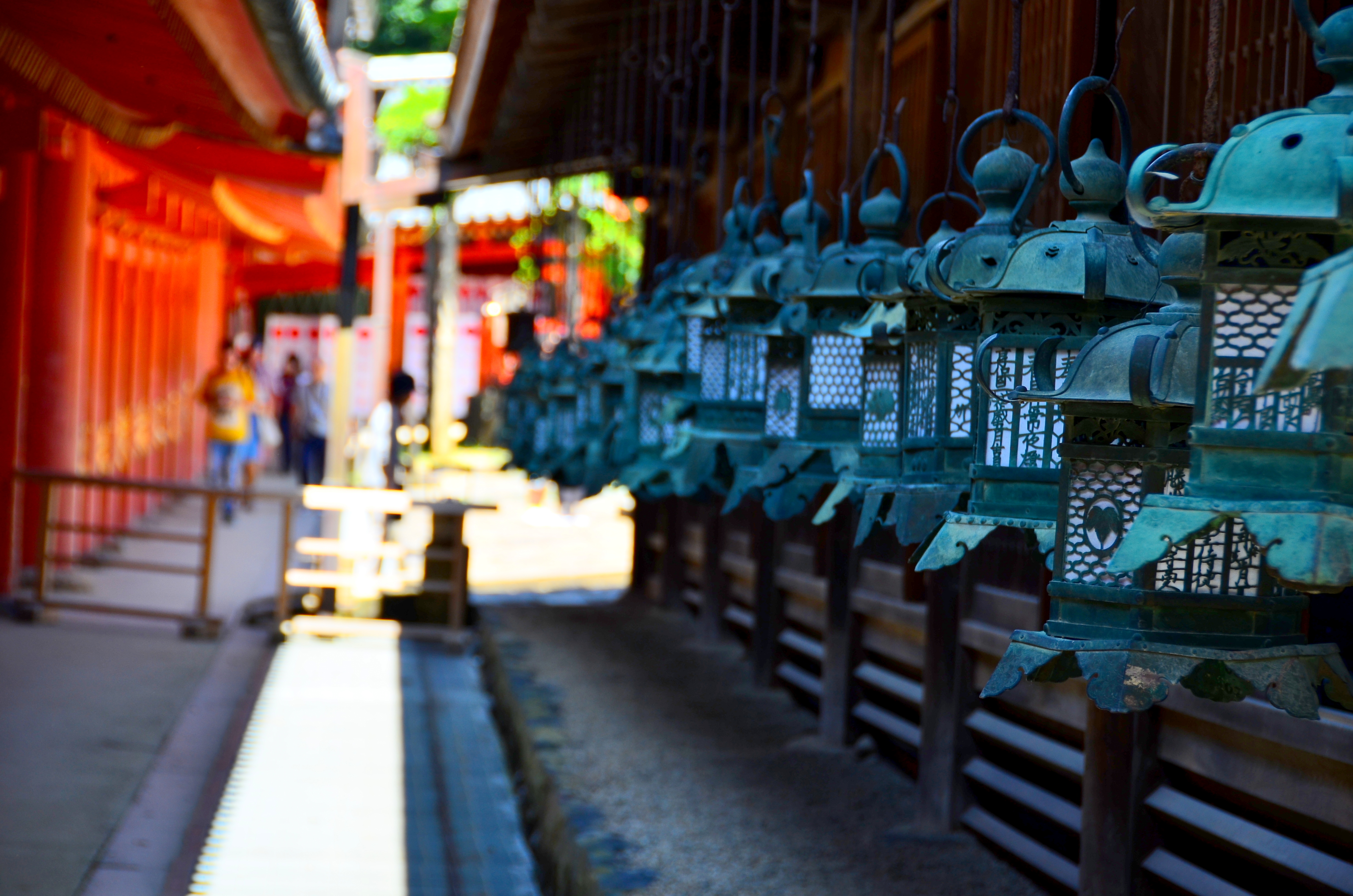
Bronze lanterns in Kasuga-taisha

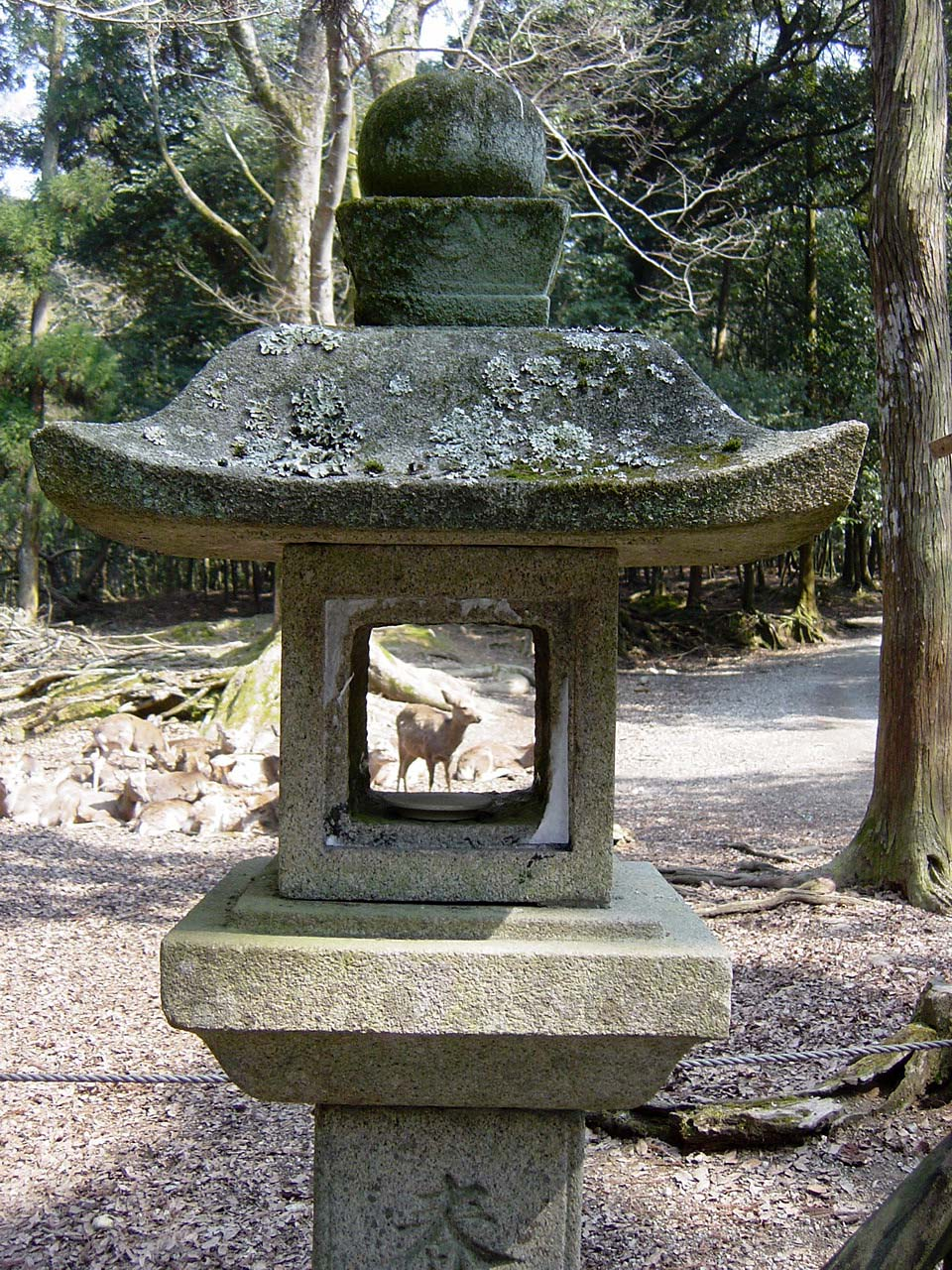
Stone lantern leading up to shrine framing a Nara Park deer

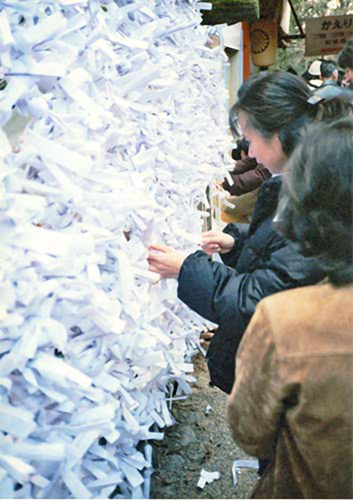
Tying omikuji at Kasuga Shrine

Path leading up to the shrine, braced by rows of stone lanterns

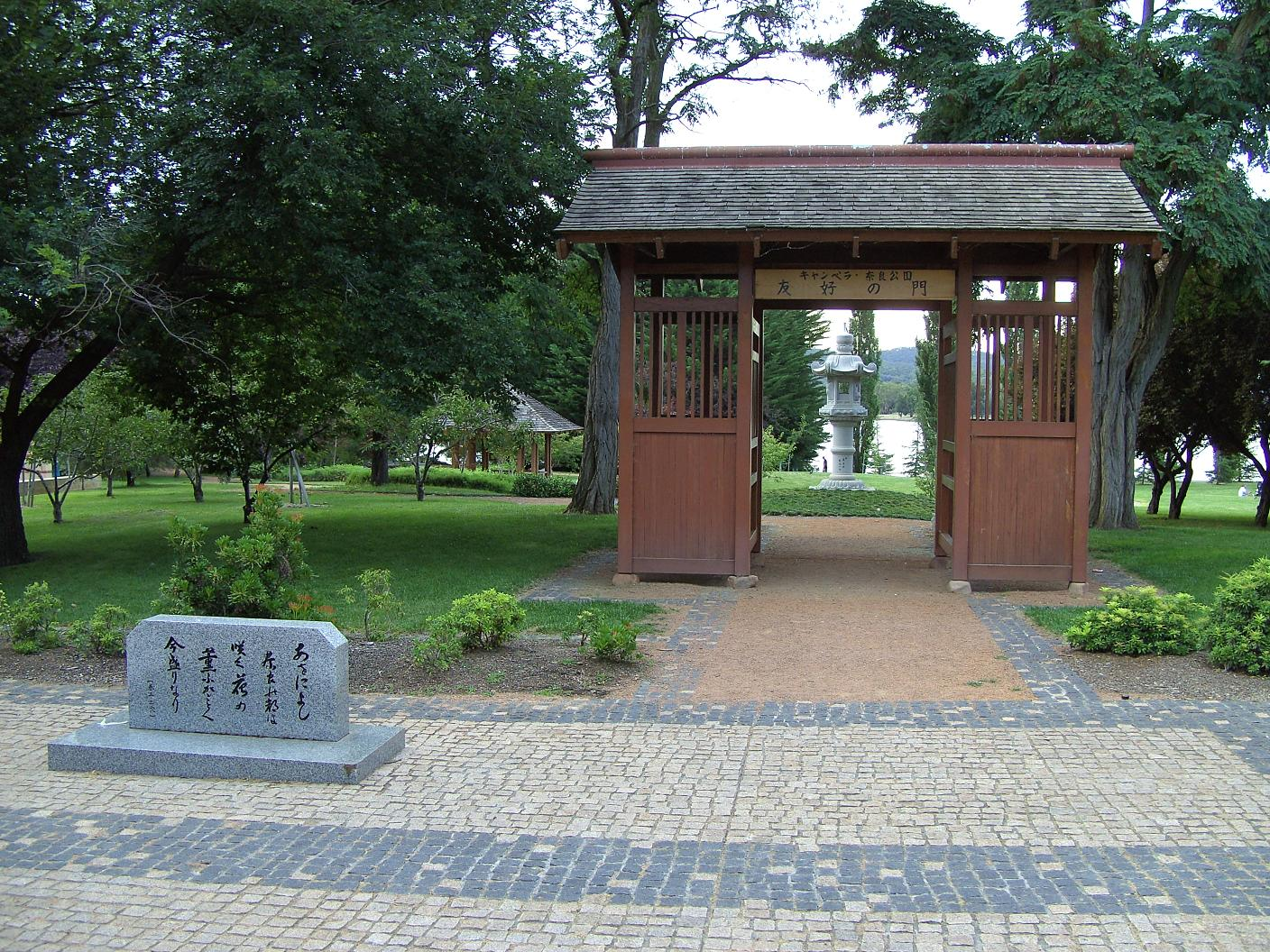
Kasuga stone lantern presented in 1997 to Nara sister city, Canberra, Australian Capital Territory

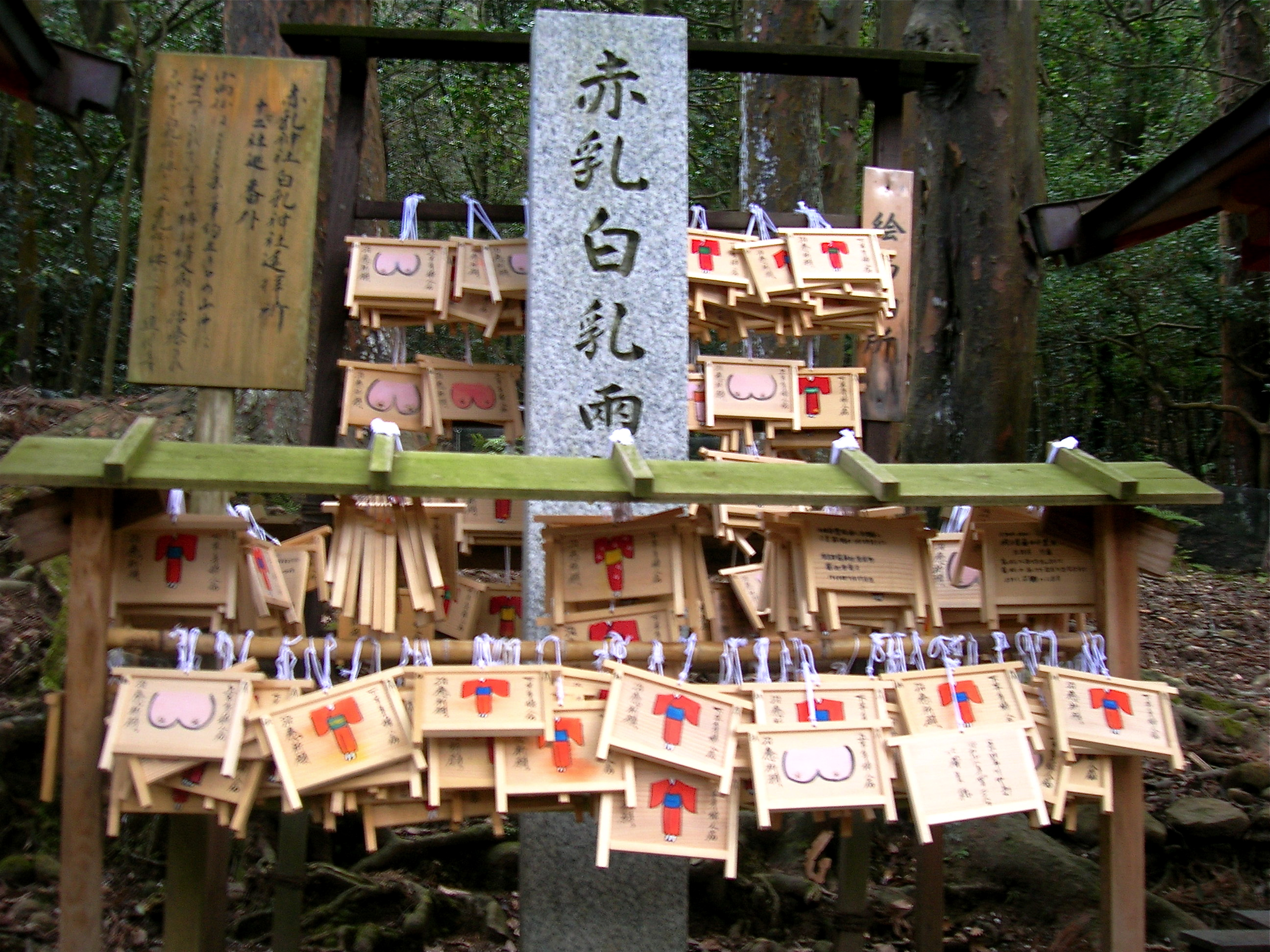
A "breast shrine" at the Kasuga Shrine walk decked with Ema plaques

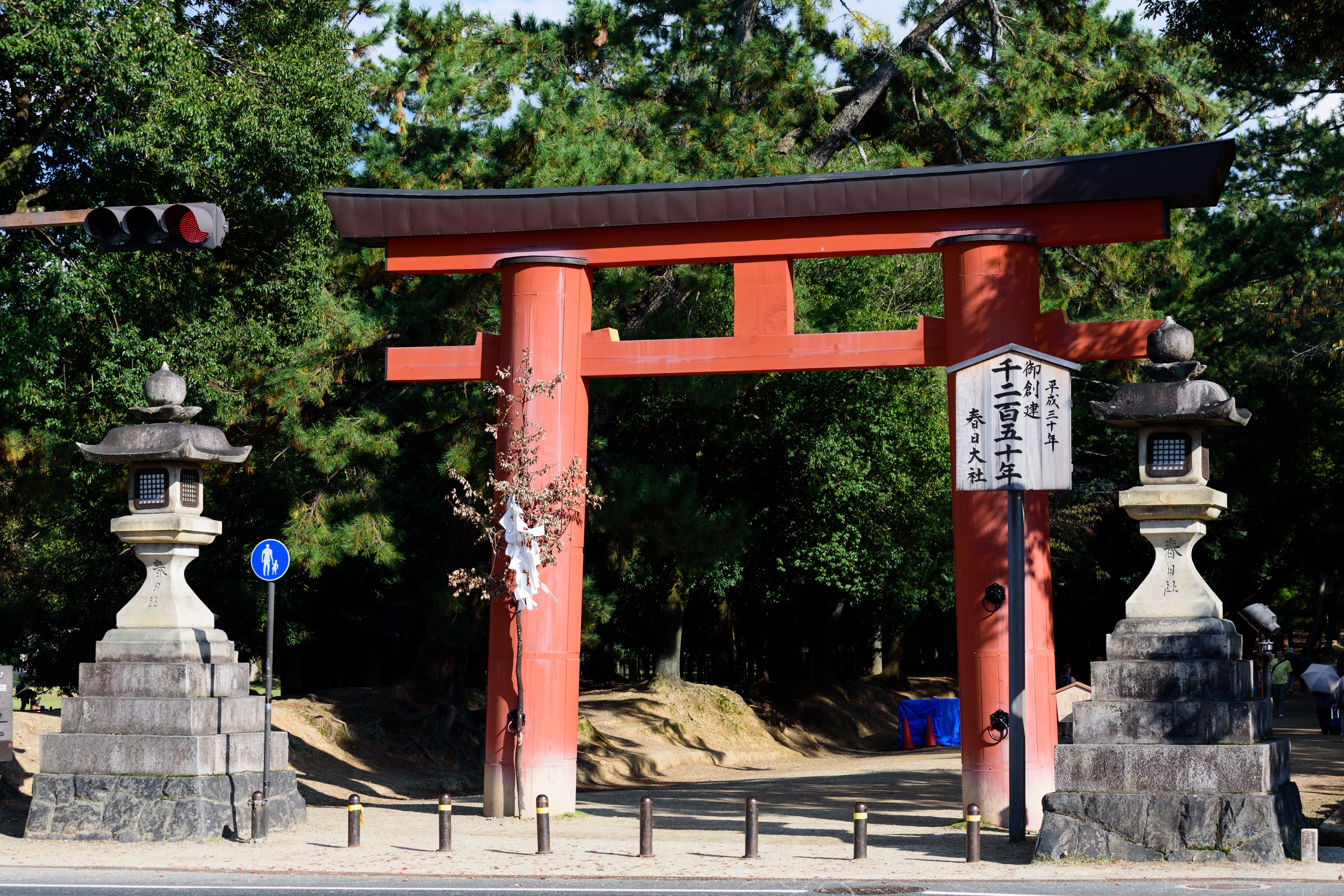
Ichi-no-Torii

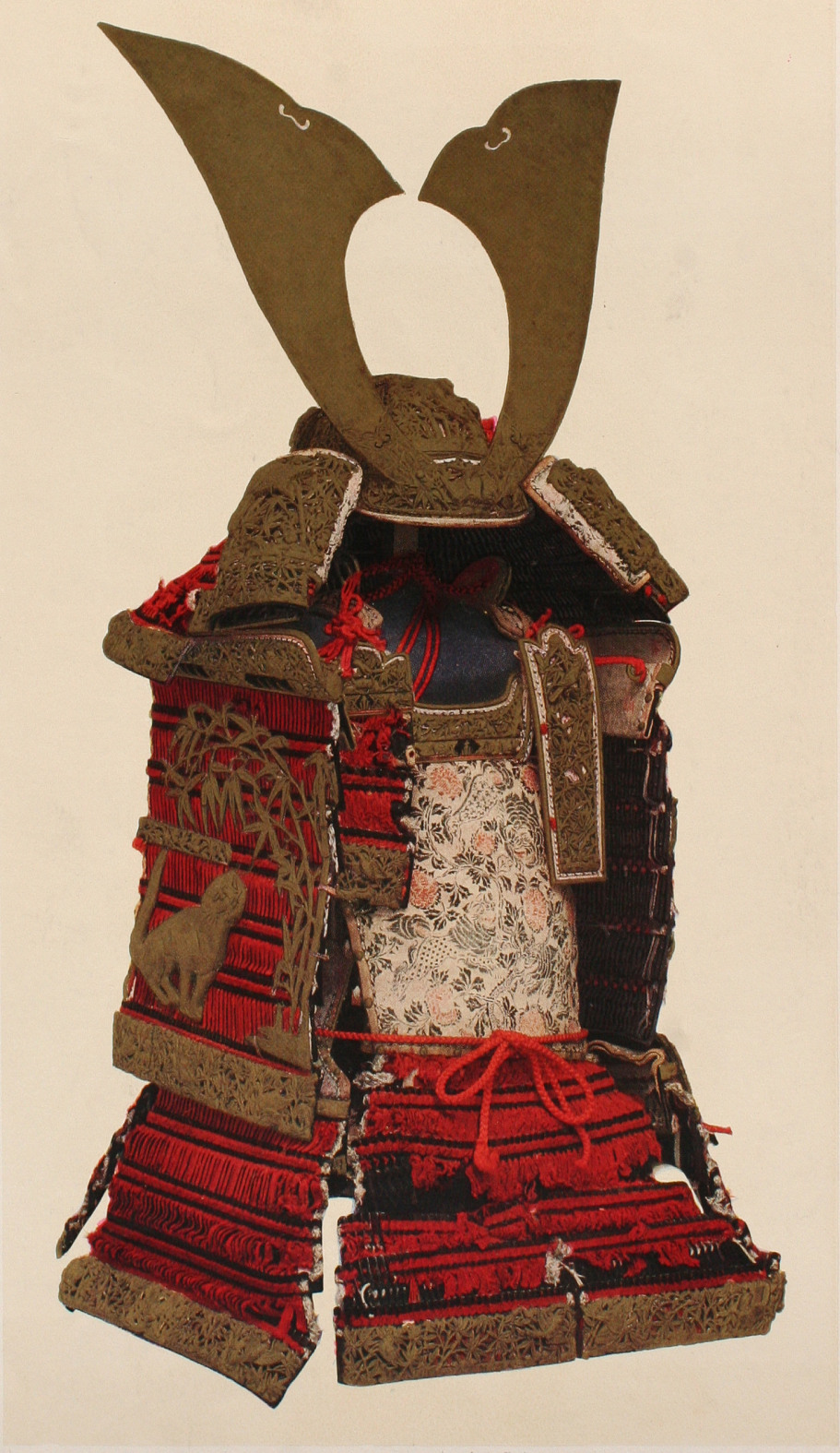
Armour laced with red threads With bamboo, tiger, sparrow motif; nomination includes the helmet; said to have been dedicated by Minamoto no Yoshitsune; one of two similar armours at Kasuga-taisha 1185 Kamakura period Ō-yoroi

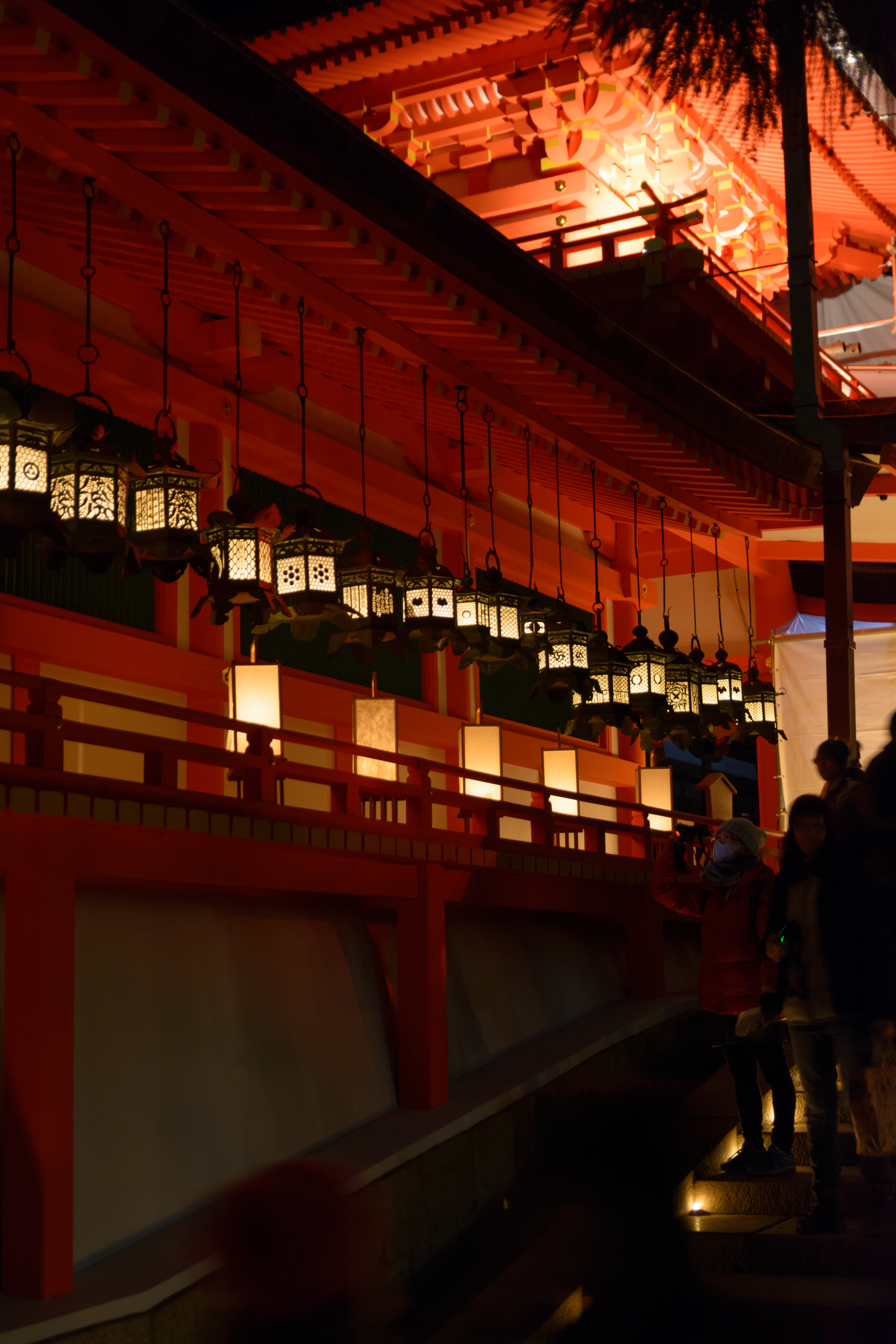
Hanging lanterns and Andons in the Setsubun Mantoro Festival

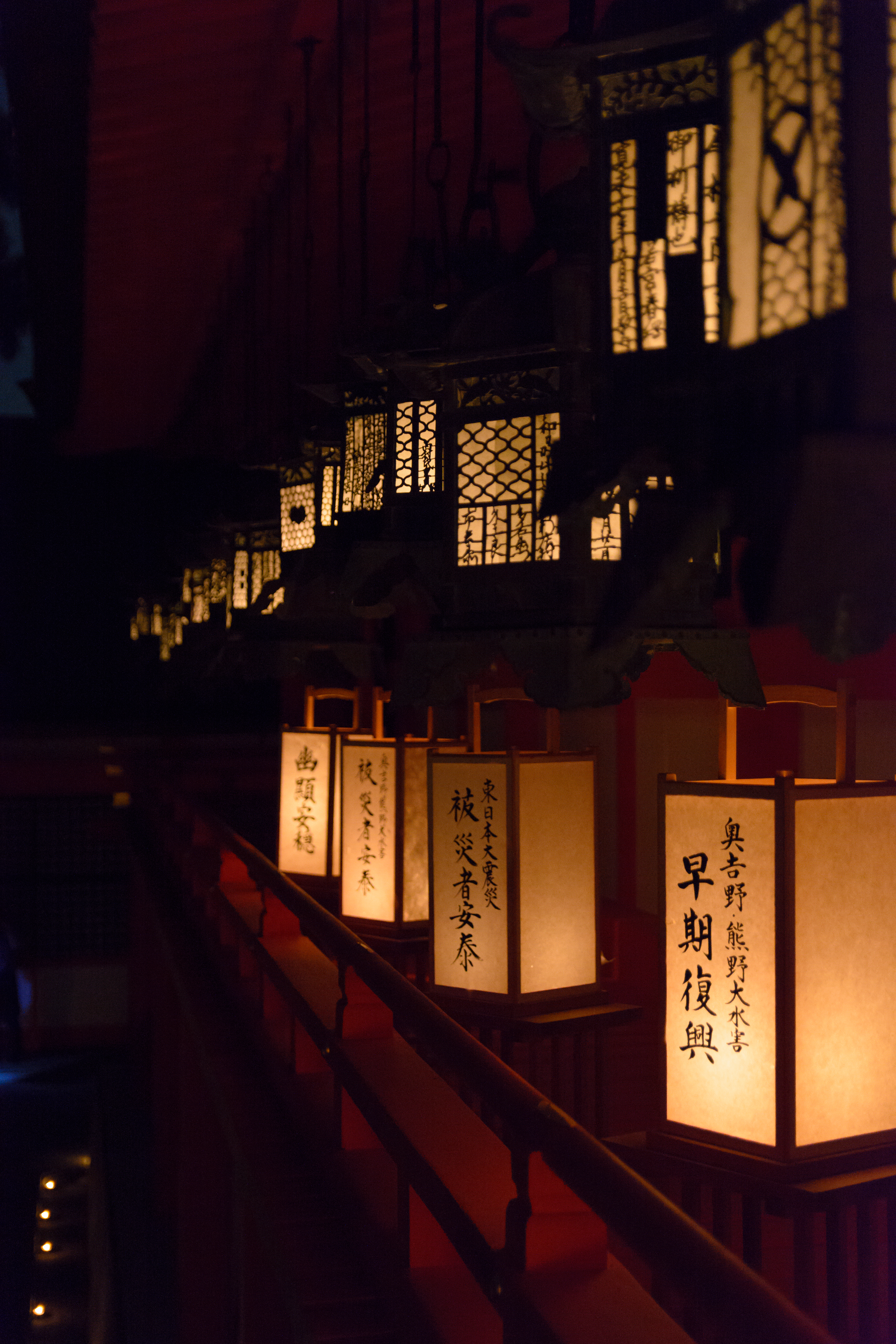
Hanging lanterns and Andons in the Setsubun Mantoro Festival. Andons, there are special prayers to the reconstruction and welfare for the victims of the Great East Japan earthquake and the 2011 flood disaster.

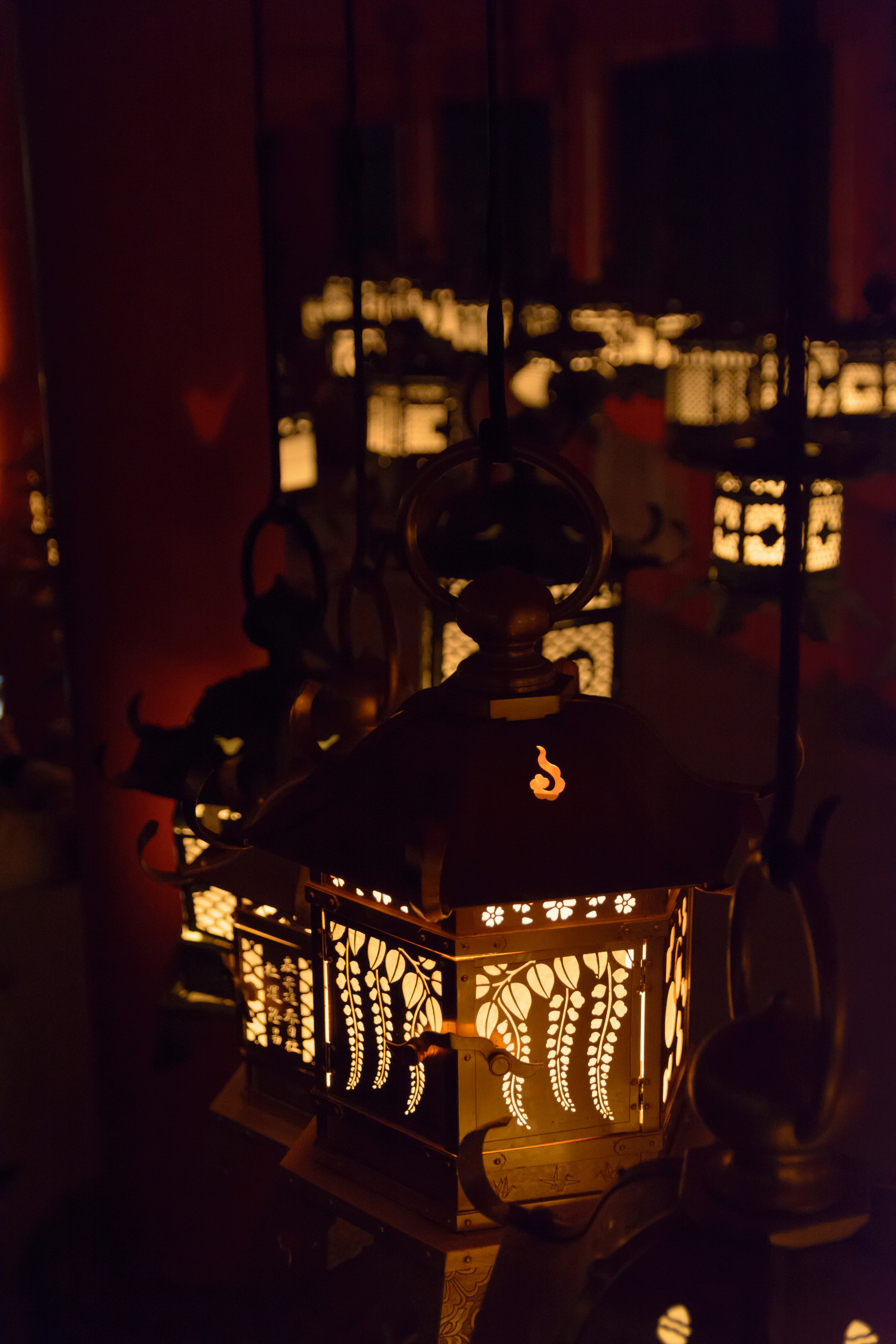
Hanging lantern designed a dropping wisteria in the Setsubun Mantoro Festival

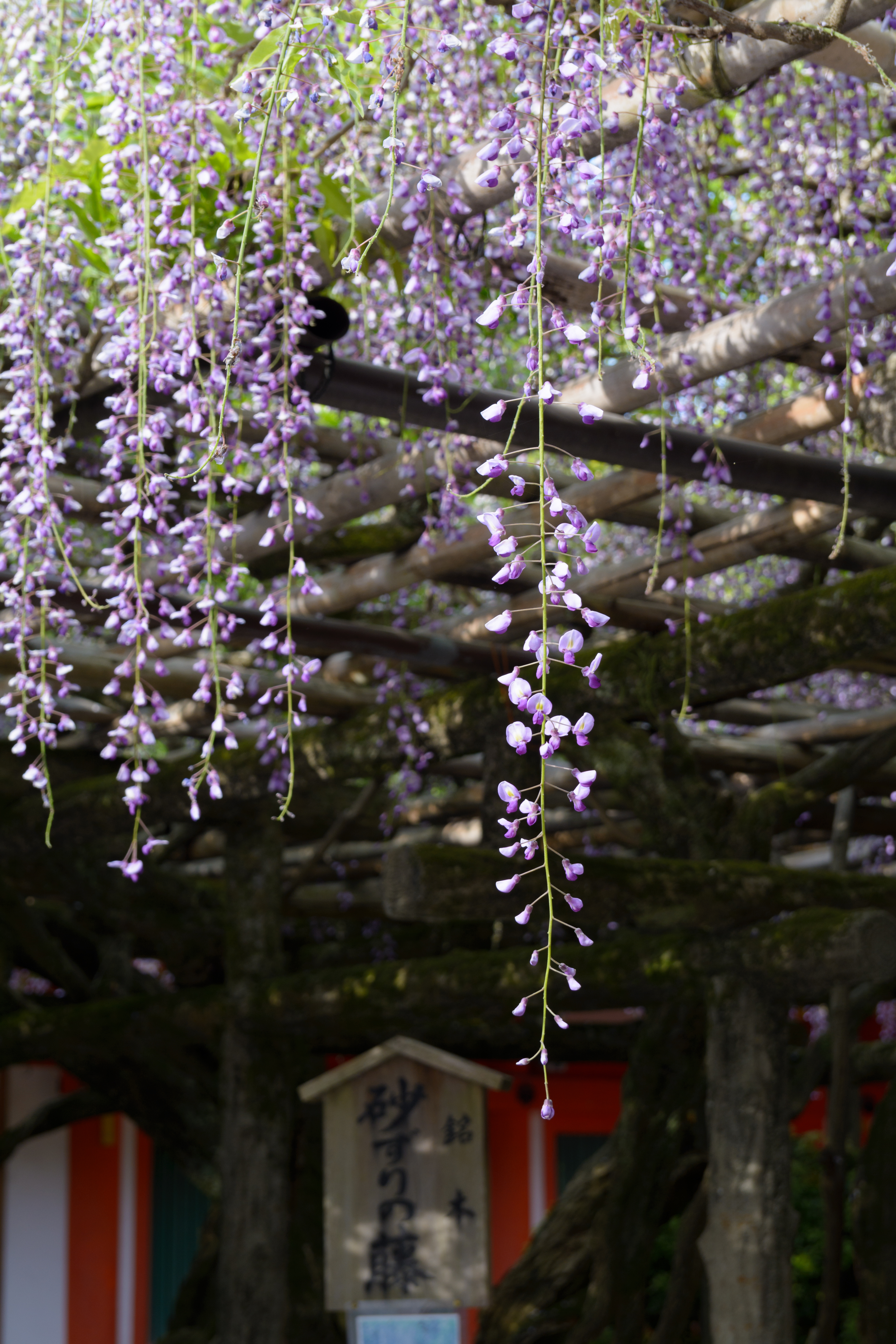
"Sunazuri-no-Fuji", wisteria flowers dropping down to reach the sand on the ground

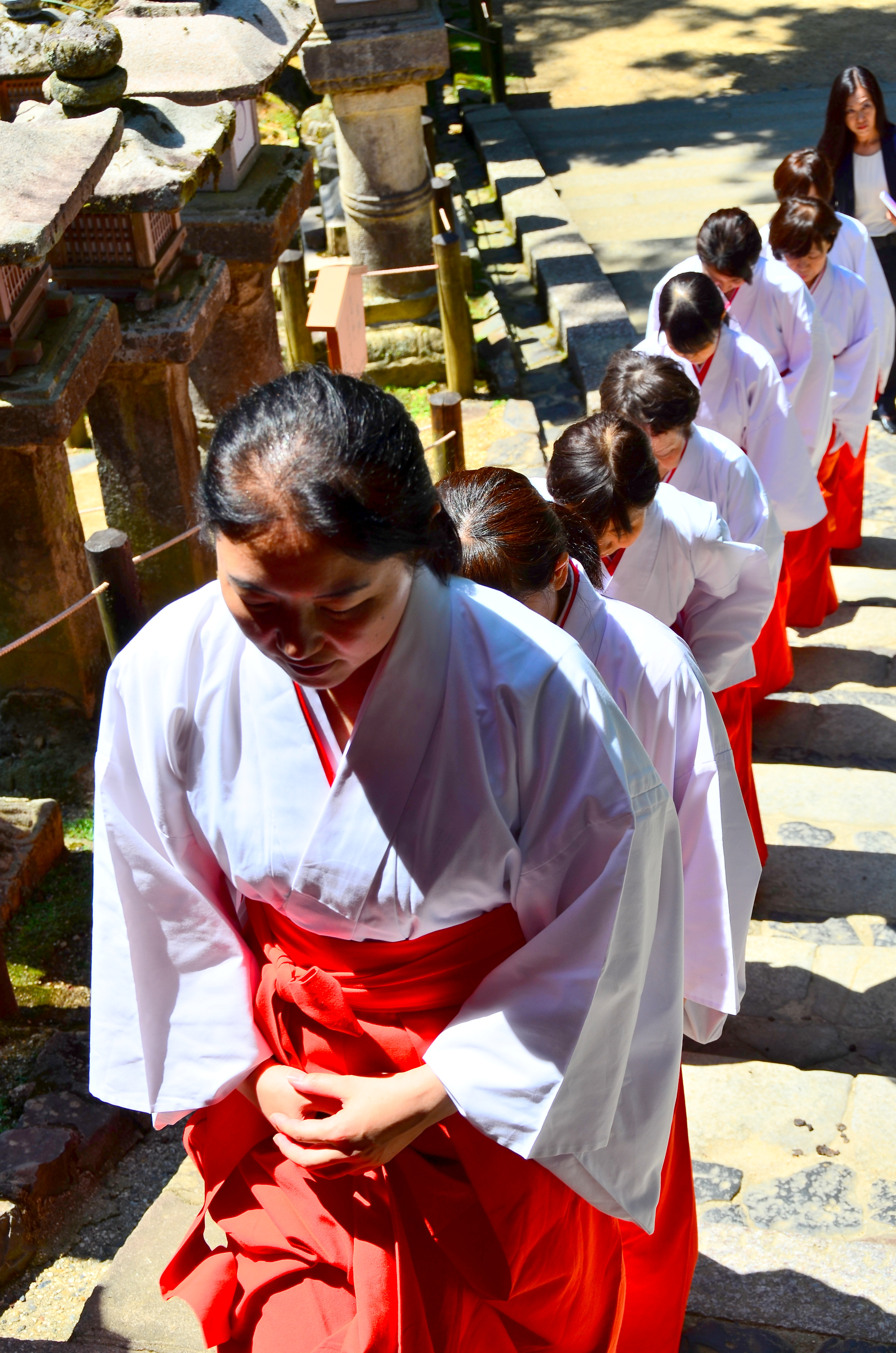
Shrine maidens in Kasuga-taisha

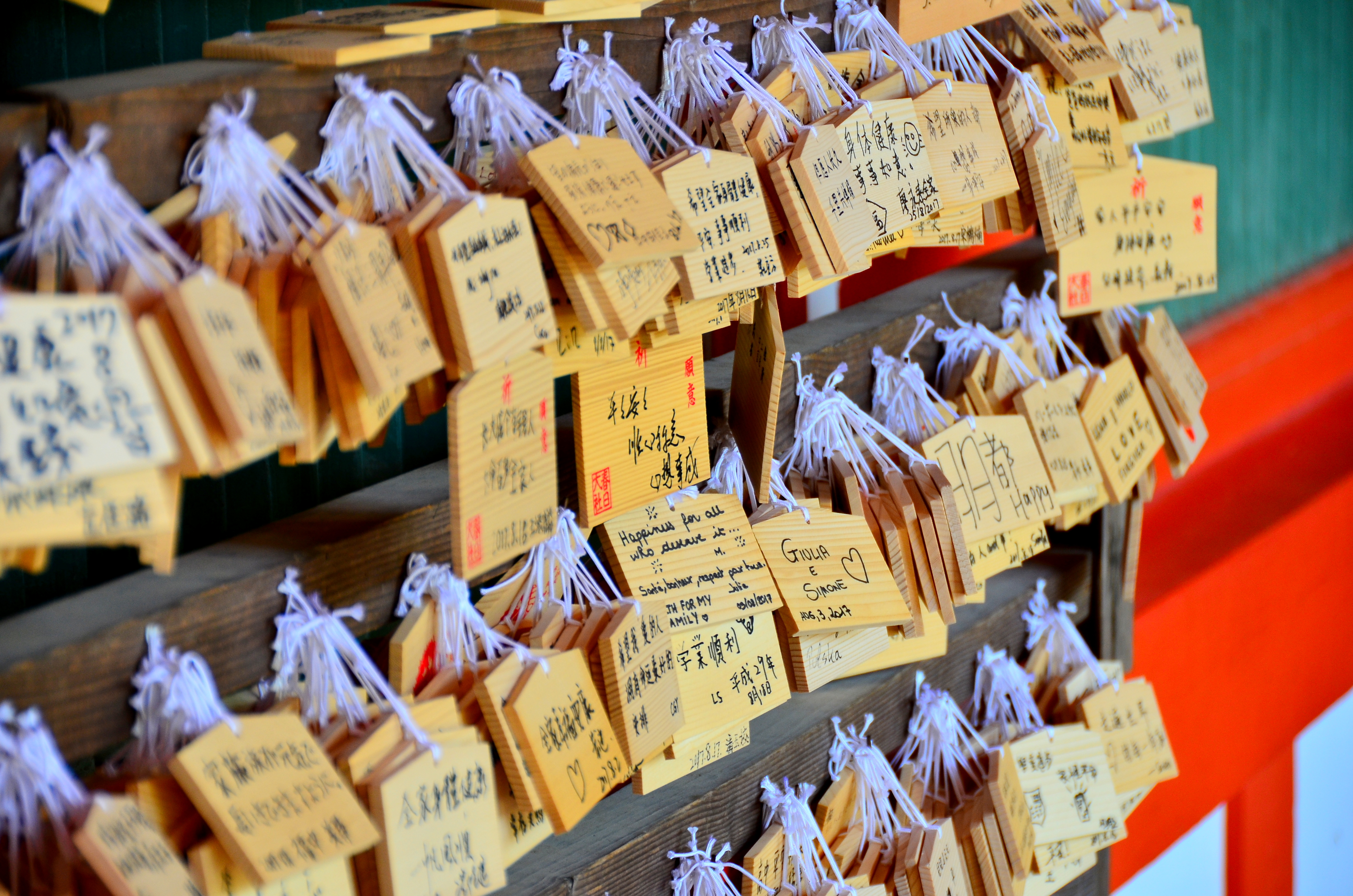
Ema (wishes) in asuga-taisha shrine

== See also ==
- List of Shinto shrines
- Twenty-Two Shrines
- List of National Treasures of Japan (crafts-others)
- List of National Treasures of Japan (crafts-swords)
- List of National Treasures of Japan (shrines)
- Deer (mythology)
- Modern system of ranked Shinto Shrines
- Kasuga Maru
- List of Special Places of Scenic Beauty, Special Historic Sites and Special Natural Monuments
- Kasugamycin
