= Kasuga =

Kasuga (春日, かすが, カスガ) may refer to:

== Places ==
- Kasuga, Fukuoka, a city in Fukuoka Prefecture, Japan
  - Kasuga Station (Fukuoka), on the Kagoshima Main Line
- Kasuga, Hyogo, a former town in Hyōgo Prefecture
- Kasuga, Gifu, a former village in Gifu Prefecture
- Kasuga Shrine, a major Shinto shrine in Nara
- Kasugayama Castle, the primary fortress of warlord Uesugi Kenshin
- Kasuga Station (Tokyo), on the Toei Subway Mita Line and Ōedo Line

== Ships ==
- Japanese warship Kasuga, also called Kasuga Maru, a Japanese wooden paddle steamer warship of the Bakumatsu and early Meiji period
- Japanese cruiser Kasuga, an armored cruiser of the Imperial Japanese Navy during the Russo-Japanese War
- Kasuga-class cruiser, armored cruisers of the Imperial Japanese Navy, in commission 1904–1945
- Japanese aircraft carrier Taiyō, previously named the Kasuga Maru ocean liner, before being converted into the Taiyō-class escort carrier of the Imperial Japanese Navy during World War II,

== People with the surname ==
- Carlos Kasuga, Japanese-Mexican businessman
- Hachiro Kasuga (1924–1991), Japanese singer
- Kanon Kasuga (born 2003), Japanese actress
- Lady Kasuga or Kasuga no Tsubone (1579–1643)
- Toshiaki Kasuga (born 1979), Japanese comedian
- Shōjirō Kasuga (1903–1976), Japanese communist activist
- Ichiban Kasuga, a character from the Yakuza series

== Other uses ==
- Kasuga, the username of the digital artist and translator who first designed Wikipe-tan
- 7674 Kasuga, a main-belt asteroid
- Ayumu "Osaka" Kasuga, a fictional character from the anime/manga series Azumanga Daioh
- Kasuga-dōrō, a type of Japanese Tōrō (stone lantern)

== See also ==
- Haruhi, which can be written with the same kanji
- Kasukabe, a city in Saitama
