= Haruyo Morita =

Japanese artist

Haruyo Morita (森田 春代, Morita Haruyo) is a Japanese artist born in Kita-Katsushika District, Saitama, Saitama Prefecture in 1945. She worked as a kimono painter until 1972. Her primary art subjects are women in kimono and idyllic settings.

== Education ==
From an early age her artistic talents were evident, and as a schoolgirl in 1960 her work was accepted for a regional art competition. She won prizes at the prefecture art exhibition (1962) and the Dai-cho ten exhibition. She served the mandatory apprenticeships and worked as a kimono painter and designer until 1972, before turning to her best-known style painting women in splendid kimono costumes and imaginative settings.

== Commercial products ==
Paintings by Haruyo Morita have been reproduced as Giclée prints, jigsaw puzzles, calendars, desktop wallpaper and posters.

== Fine art ==
She is the artist of Twelve-Layer Kimono, a Shōwa period print with painted designs ink, color, and gold on paper. In her art she was influenced by the style and drama of Kabuki theatre and the Edo period of Japanese culture.

In 2017, during the curatorship of the VMFA's Asian expert, art curator and historian Li Jian, Haruyo Morita's Twelve-Layer Kimono, a gift from a private collection, was added to the permanent collection of the Virginia Museum of Fine Arts' extensive Asian holdings.

== Biography ==
She relocated to London in 1977 and arranged exhibitions of her work in London, Los Angeles, New York, and Honolulu.
