= Doremidan =

Japanese visual kei rock band

- Origin: Osaka, Japan
- Genre: Rock
- Years active: 2002–2012
- Labels: Akatsuki, Mijinko
- Past members: Maya; Haruhi; Ko-Zi; Makoto; Reika; Ryu; Ken; Shinji
- Website: www.doremidan.com

Doremidan (ドレミ團) was a Japanese visual kei rock band formed on January 1, 2002 by singer Makoto and drummer Reika. The band was signed to Akatsuki label.

== Musical styles ==
The band's musical influence included music genres like jazz, swing, blues, tango, and rock'n'roll.

The name Doremidan comes from The Beatles' song "Don't Let Me Down": the title, pronounced rapidly with a Japanese accent, will sound as Doremidan.

== Former members ==
- Makoto (マコト) – vocals, accordion (2002–)
- Ken guitar (2003–)
- Ryu (龍) guitar (2003–)
- Reika (零華) – drums (2002–)
- Maya – bass, contra bass (2003–2004)
- Haruhi – guitar (2002–2002)
- Ko-Zi – bass (2002–2002)
- Syuren – guitar (2002–2002) "Support member”
- Shinji (シンジ) – bass (2005–2009)

== Biography ==
Doremidan was formed on January 1, 2002 in Osaka as a session band. The original line-up was Makoto on vocals, Haruhi on guitar, Ko-Zi on drums and Reika on drums. They started out mainly playing songs from Haruhi's former band but as they decided to continue as a serious band they started to compose their own songs.

They played their first one-man concert on December 12, the same day as Haruhi and Ko-zi left the band along with the support member Syuren.

With two guitarists and a bassist missing the two remaining artist took a small break to recruit new members and was back again on the first day of 2003. The new members was Ken on guitar, Ryu on guitar and Maya on bass and contra bass.

The first release with the new line-up was Shinshoku Doremi techou (maxi-single). Since Haruhi had been the main songwriter and as he left the band and his role was now taken over by Maya and Ken with Makoto writing the lyrics the music style was slightly changed from the old Doremidan. The maxi-single however became a hit and the 3,000 copies sold out on the release date.

In October 2004, the Maya left the band after the final concert of their small one-man tour and was replaced by Shinji in 2005. In 2005, they also released their first full album, called Gekijou Shouroku.

In August 2007, Doremidan break a number of months due Makoto's family circumstances. Mars 2008 they were back, and for those fans who'd been fearing that the break would last forever it was a relief. Mars 5 they released the best-of album Onkai Chronicle and two months later they released a new full-length album Yuugure Line which got mixed reviews by the fans.

On January 23, Doremidan had been introducing their new member Yuu at their first live in 2010, who joined them as their new bassist.

The released their first Major Album "Don't Let Me Down" in December 2009.

Doremidan split up after their final tour in 2012. Their final concert was performed March 20 at the Akasaka Blitz.

== Discography ==
=== Albums and EPs ===
- Retujou Lullaby (劣情ららばい) (June 23, 2004) (Mini-album)
- Gekijou Shouroku (激情抄録) (March 23, 2005)
- Kaleidoscope (カレイドスコープ) (July 5, 2006)
- Onkai Chronicle (カレイドスコープ) (March 5, 2008)
- Yuugure Line (夕暮ライン) (May 7, 2008)

=== Singles ===
- "Kabocha no Basha wa Mach Go! Go!" (カボチャの馬車はマッハGO!GO!) (August 8, 2002)
- "Akai Kutsu" (赤い靴) (December 12, 2002)
- "Shinshoku Doremi Techou" (眞色ドレミ手帖) (April 4, 2003)
- "Kyoushuu Elegy Triple Play" (郷愁悲歌三重殺) (August 8, 2003)
- "Subarashiki kana Kata Soubo" (素晴らしきかな過多想募) (September 29, 2003)
- "Kono Ame no Mukou ni..." (この雨の向こうに...) (October 13, 2003)
- "Hatsukoi Monogatari" (はつ恋物語り) (October 18, 2003)
- "Pocket ni Garakuta wo..." (ポケットにがらくたを...) (April 4, 2004)
- "Subarashiki kana Kata Soubo" (素晴らしきかな過多想募) (September 16, 2004)
- "Rensou Yuugi" (戀想遊戯) (April 16, 2005)
- "Higanbana / Down By Low" (彼岸花) (July 27, 2005)
- "Ensei Romanesque" (厭世ロマネスク) (November 23, 2005)
- "Tokyo Tragedy" (東京トラジェディー) (January 7, 2006)
- "Sangatsu" (傘月) (April 19, 2006)
- "Tsuisou no Shinkirou" (追想ノ蜃気楼) (May 16, 2006)
- "The Faust" (ザ・ファウスト) (June 14, 2006)
- "Mugen Yoto ~Maboroshi Lamp~" (夢幻洋灯 ～まぼろしらんぷ～) (November 15, 2006)
- "Wakaba no Kioku" (ワカバノキヲク) (March 21, 2007)
- "Girl Hunt" (ガァルハント) (July 4, 2007)
- "Seishun Roll Over" (青春ロールオーバー) (August 6, 2008)
- "Hello!! Brand New Day" (ハロー!! ブランニューデイ) (March 27, 2009)

=== DVDs ===
- Tokyo Himehajime 2 -2006.1.7 Live at Liquid Room Ebisu- (東京姫始メ2 -2006.1.7 LIVE at LIQUID ROOM ebisu-) (August 15, 2006)
- Tokyo Himehajime 3 -2007.1.7 Live at Shibuya Club Quattro- (東京姫始メ3 -2007.1.7 LIVE at SHIBUYA CLUB QUATTRO-) (May 30, 2007)
- Tokyo Onkai Selection '08 (東京音階セレクション'08; Tokyo Musical Scale Selection '08) (December 17)

=== Demo tape ===
- "Chocolate Candy" (チョコレエトキャンディ) (March 3, 2002)
