= Harue Shigima =

Paranormasight protagonist

- Paranormasight character
- Harue in Paranormasight
- First appearance: Paranormasight: The Seven Mysteries of Honjo (2023)
- Created by: Takanari Ishiyama
- Designed by: Gen Kobayashi

In-universe information
- Nationality: Japanese

Harue Shigima (Japanese: 志岐間 春恵, Hepburn: Shigima Harue) is a character in the 2023 video game Paranormasight: The Seven Mysteries of Honjo, one of its protagonists. She works with a private detective named Richter in order to participate in the Feast of Shadows, an occurrence that causes people who bears curses, such as herself, to kill other curse bearers or steal their curses to potentially use the Rite of Resurrection in order to resurrect her murdered son.

Harue was created by Takanari Ishiyama who wrote the scenario, and Gen Kobayashi, who did her design. Kobayashi was asked to put more emphasis on her facial expressions, particularly her angry expression, which lead to Ishiyama changing the way she speaks. She has received generally popular reception, considered among the best of the game's cast. Particular points of praise included the thematic connection between the story and her character arc, as well as her facial expressions.

== Concept and creation ==
Harue Shigima was created for Paranormasight: The Seven Mysteries of Honjo by writer Takanari Ishiyama. Her design was created by the game's character designer, Gen Kobayashi. Kobayashi picked her as his favorite character, stating that he "likes women with a dark side" and that he found her feelings were the strongest of the cast. He stated that he put a lot of effort into her facial expressions, noting that he may have put too much effort in. Kobayashi stated that her design is something he had not made before, and so he tried to incorporate all of his favorite elements into her design. When designing her angry expression, Kobayashi was told by Ishiyama to give her angry expression a stronger impact, receiving detailed instructions on how to execute it. Initially, her dialogue was described by Ishiyama as being more normal, using more feminine words, but when he saw the facial expressions Kobayashi designed, he changed it.

== Appearances ==
A year after her son was kidnapped and murdered, Harue encounters the spirit behind the mystery of the Haunting Clappers curse, causing her to become a Curse Bearer and giving her a stone connected to this curse. She gains the ability to participate in the Feast of Shadows, in which her and other Curse Bearers may kill each other or regular people to add souls to their stones, as well as steal others' stones. Each Curse Bearer has their own ability to kill with their spirit; for Harue, her ability allows her to cause anyone who is carrying a fire or fire-starting device to burst into flames. As part of the Feast of Shadows, her goal is to collect enough souls to resurrect her son through the Rite of Resurrection, who was killed after a kidnapping negotiation gone wrong. Harue works with a private detective named Richter Kai, who agrees to help her on the condition that they steal stones without killing anyone.

== Reception ==
Harue's facial expressions received attention from critics

Harue has received positive reception from fans and critics. In a Famitsu poll, readers voted her the third best character of the game, which Famitsu staff attributed to "melancholy and bewitching appearance" and her "inner determination and sad past." When organizing a tournament of different characters' curses, Dengeki Online writer Somin admitted to having a bias for Harue, saying they love her, and commenting on the efficacy of her power, being that half of the cast are smokers. In their review of Paranormasight, Dengeki Online staff found her design sexy, commenting that her facial expressions create more pressure, making her appear more dangerous. Harue was identified as a favorite by multiple game industry workers, such as voice actress and 4gamer columnist Yui and Unicorn Overlord director Takashi Noma.

Siliconera writer Stephanie Liu considered Harue the most important character in the game, arguing that even if she was not the main protagonist, she was the strongest of everyone in the cast. She discussed how relatable Harue's story and motivations are, and how easy it is to feel the "pain and grief that a mother would go through if she lost her son in a manner as tragic as murder." She felt that some other characters, like Yakko, were clearly never going to use the Rite, but with Harue, there was narrative tension behind her story, adding that while she is the most desperate, she also does not have the determination of some other characters. She felt that her character arc was the most in keeping with the themes of the game, and the only character who, if she was the star, the game would still work. Famitsu writer Okdos Kumada considered her a standout member of the cast, talking about how the story revealed the kind of person she was, as well as the things she experienced, such as her upbringing. They felt that Harue seemed like a living, breathing person, and they were able to identify with her state of mind, and why she would go to such resorts to resurrect her son. The relationship between Harue and Richter was positively received by Sirabee writer Yuragi Yuragi, appreciating how different the two were and how that informed their dialogue and the investigation.
