= Paranormasight: The Seven Mysteries of Honjo =

2023 video game

- Developer: Xeen
- Publisher: Square Enix
- Directors: Takanari Ishiyama; Yoshihito Okuno
- Producers: Kazuhiro Kawakami; Kazuma Oushu
- Programmer: Naoki Takishita
- Artists: Gen Kobayashi; Junko Sumimizu
- Writer: Takanari Ishiyama
- Composer: Hidenori Iwasaki
- Platforms: iOS; Windows; Android; Nintendo Switch
- Release: iOS, Windows; March 8, 2023; Android, Switch; March 9, 2023
- Genre: Visual novel
- Mode: Single-player

Paranormasight: The Seven Mysteries of Honjo (Note: Japanese: パラノマサイト FILE23 本所七不思議, Hepburn: Paranormasight FILE23 Honjo Nanafushigi) is a 2023 visual novel video game developed by Xeen and published by Square Enix for Android, iOS, Nintendo Switch, and Windows.

The game received positive reviews from critics. A direct manga sequel was released in 2025, while a standalone video game sequel, Paranormasight: The Mermaid's Curse, was released on February 19, 2026.

== Gameplay ==
An exploration section in the game. In first-person, the player can explore in a 360-degree panoramic view.

Paranormasight: The Seven Mysteries of Honjo is a visual novel. The player must work through each story in order to uncover the mystery behind the curses taking over the district. The gameplay mostly focuses on the plot with brief sections for investigations and quizzes based on what the player has learned. A flow chart allows the player to go between the storylines and perspectives of the main characters. Certain story branches and choices can bring a character to their death leading the player to revert to an earlier scene to deduce how to alter the events and trigger an alternative story path.

== Plot ==
Set in the 1980s, in Sumida, Tokyo, Japan, the plot centers on supernatural urban legends named The Seven Mysteries of Honjo. One night, several different people are given the ability to inflict others with deadly curses, including a teenage girl named Yakko Sakazaki, Tetsuo Tsutsumi, Harue Shigima, and others. Other characters, including Richter Kai and Mio Kurosuzu, assist certain characters, including Harue and Yakko respectively.

== Development ==
Paranormasight: The Seven Mysteries of Honjo was developed by Xeen for Square Enix. The game was directed and written by Takanari Ishiyama. Ishiyama has several visual novel game credits previously, as well as working on Metal Gear Solid as a sound engineer and on Final Fantasy XII: Revenant Wings.

== Release ==
Paranormasight: The Seven Mysteries of Honjo was revealed during the Japanese Nintendo Direct in February 2023. It was released for iOS and Windows via Steam on March 8, 2023. The Android and Nintendo Switch versions followed the next day.

== Reception ==
Reception

Aggregate scores
Aggregator	Score
Metacritic	PC: 82/100; NS: 85/100
OpenCritic	85% recommend

Review scores
Publication	Score
Destructoid	8.5/10
Edge	8/10
Nintendo Life	9/10
Nintendo World Report	9/10
RPGFan	70/100
TouchArcade	4.5/5
Digital Spy	4.5/5
IGN Japan	8/10

The Windows and Nintendo Switch versions of Paranormasight: The Seven Mysteries of Honjo received "generally favorable reviews" according to review aggregator platform Metacritic.

Joe DeVader of Nintendo World Report praised the game mechanics and art style, but opined that the horror gets in the way of the story occasionally, and deemed the Switch controls to be poor, noting awkward d-pad navigation. Ollie Reynolds declared the game to be "one of the most intriguing and engaging narratives we’ve experienced in a good while", and praised the game's visuals, characters, and horror scenes. Handley, while describing the game as having "few bells and whistles", said that it manages to be stylish, specifically with the wide panoramic backgrounds to search through. Abraham Kobylanski of RPGFan admired the characters, but found the narrative too straightforward and felt that it relied too heavily on comedy over horror.

The game was one of eleven titles to receive the "Award of Excellence" at the Japan Game Awards in 2023.
