= Harumi, Tokyo =

District in Tokyo, Japan

Harumi 晴海
- District
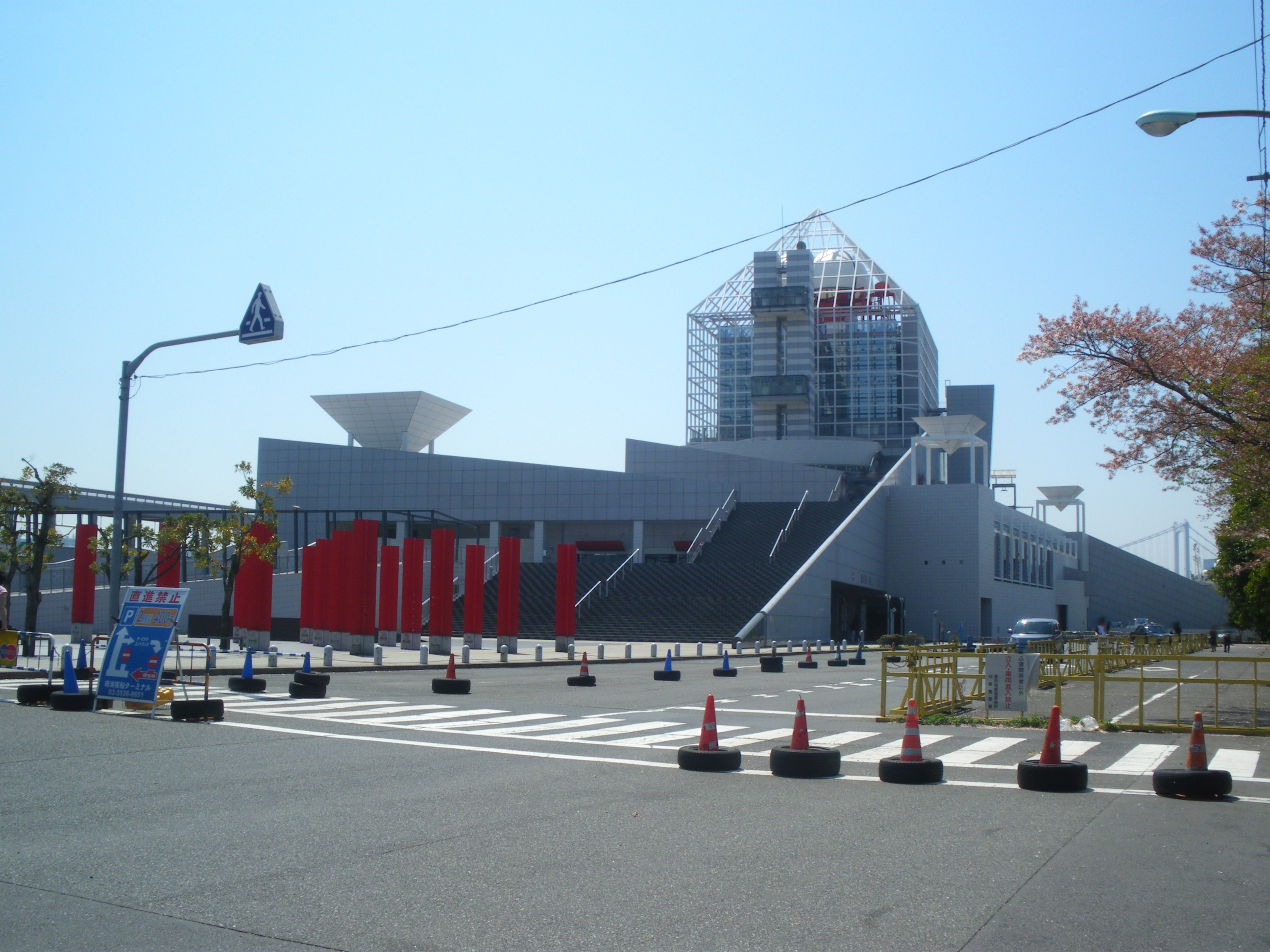
- Harumi passenger ship terminal

- Location within Tokyo Bay and Bōsō Peninsula Location within Special wards of Tokyo Location within Tokyo Location within Japan
- Coordinates: 35°39′34.83″N 139°47′5.64″E
- Country: Japan
- City: Tokyo
- Ward: Chūō

Population (September 1, 2019)
  - Total: 16,120
- Time zone: UTC+9 (JST)
- Postal code: 104-0053
- Area code: 03

Harumi (晴海) is a district of Chūō, Tokyo. The district contains five chōme (subdivisions), and the postal code is 104-0053. Harumi is located on reclaimed land, created by dropping earth and sediment generated from expanding Tokyo Bay. The construction took place starting in the middle of the Meiji era and was completed early in the Showa era. Before an official name was decided for the district, it was called Tsukishima No. 4.

== History ==
By April 1929, a landfill had been completed and the area was known as Tsukishima No. 4 (Tokyo Bay Landfill No. 4).

On July 15, 1937 the area was named Harumi-cho by local residents.

The district was designated to host celebrations of the 2600th anniversary of the founding of Japan (by the mythical emperor Jimmu), but celebrations (scheduled to take place in 1940) were canceled due to Japan being at war with the Republic of China and occupation of the Korean Peninsula.

On March 15, 1947 Nihonbashi Ward and Kyobashi Ward merged to form Chuo Ward.

The Olympic Village for the 2020 Olympics (postponed to 2021 due to the COVID-19 pandemic) was located in the 5th chōme of Harumi, at Harumi Futo.

== Demographics ==
In total, the district has 7,377 households and 16,120 people as of December 1, 2019.

The number of households and population of each chōme as of December 1, 2019 are as follows:

Chome	Number of households	population
Harumi 1-chome	1,889 households	4,074 people
Harumi 2-chome	2,520 households	6,016 people
Harumi 3-chome	2,089 households	4,179 people
Harumi 4-chome	80 households	112 people
Harumi 5-chome	799 households	1,739 people
Total	7,377 households	16,120 people

== Education ==
Public elementary and junior high schools are operated by Chuo City Board of Education.

Harumi is zoned to Tsukishima Daisan (Tsukishima No. 3) Elementary School (月島第三小学校) and Harumi Junior High School (晴海中学校).

== Transport ==
Harumi is currently not served by any railway lines. If built, the proposed Tokyo Rinkai Subway Line would offer a direct connection to Tokyo Station.
