= Transport during the 2024 Summer Olympics and Paralympics =

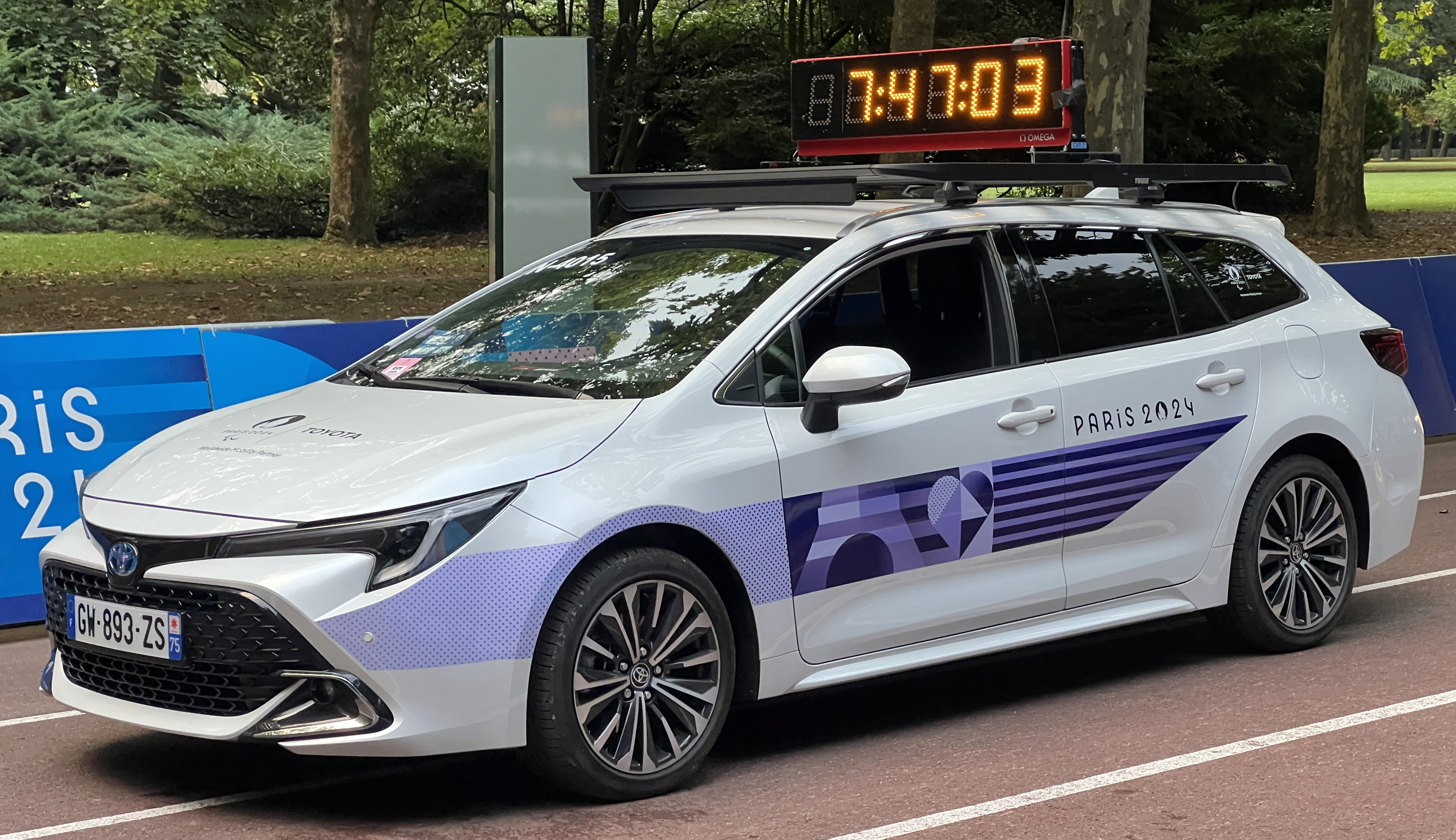
Official car in the marathon of the 2024 Paralympic Games

Transport played a critical part in the success of the 2024 Summer Olympics and Paralympics, hosted in Paris, from 26 July to 11 August and 28 August to 8 September respectively. Due to the scale of the events, moving athletes, officials, media and spectators to competition venues constituted a major challenge. As part of Paris's bid for the games, officials stated that 100% of spectators would use public transport, and the compact arrangement of venues would deliver short journey times. Over €500 million was invested in improvements to transport infrastructure for the games.

A mobile app was developed to facilitate spectator travel by offering a route calculator that can adapt to hazards. To assist travellers, 5,000 agents, identifiable by purple vests, were deployed in the stations and at bus stops. Most bus lines were accessible to people with reduced mobility, but with limited capacity in cases of high demand, such as during the Paralympic Games, 1,000 taxis accessible to people in wheelchairs were made available. The vast majority of Paris Métro stations were still not accessible to all, but some 150 wheelchair-accessible shuttles were provided to transport spectators between venues and an accessible station. Security around the transport system was heavy and coordinated, but on 26 July 2024, the day of the 2024 Summer Olympics opening ceremony, a series of arson attacks disrupted rail services.

A stated goal of Paris 2024 was to halve the carbon footprint of the Olympic and Paralympic Games compared with London 2012 and Rio 2016. The organisers estimated that more than a third of the greenhouse gas emissions linked to the games would be from the transport of athletes and spectators. To meet this goal, all venues were made accessible by bicycle and public transport. Public transport was extended and improved, and services increased. Some 415 kilometres (258 mi) of cycle paths were created, linking major venues, with 27,000 temporary bicycle racks installed. The goal of halving carbon emissions was ultimately met, with an estimated 1.59 million tonnes of CO_{2} equivalent, which represented a 54.6% reduction compared to the London and Rio average. Of this, 53% of the carbon footprint (about 833,600 tonnes of CO_{2} equivalent) was incurred by visitors travelling to the games.

== Background ==
Paris was formally announced as the host city for the 2024 Summer Olympics and Paralympics at an International Olympic Committee (IOC) meeting in Lima, Peru, on 13 September 2017, although it had been a near certainty since 11 July, when rival Los Angeles elected to bid for 2028 instead. The games were hosted from 26 July to 11 August (Summer Olympics) and 28 August to 8 September (Paralympics). To host the games, organisers must provide transport for a wide range of groups – including athletes and officials, media and spectators. The IOC consider transport as being "critical to the success of the games", with some previous games (such as Atlanta 1996) marred by transport issues.

As part of their bid for the games, Paris claimed that they had "the world's best public transport system", proposing that spectators would use free public transport, and that the compact arrangement of venues would deliver short journey times for athletes and officials, media and spectators. A stated goal of Paris 2024 was to halve the carbon footprint of the Olympic and Paralympic Games compared with London 2012 and Rio 2016. The average carbon footprint for these games was 3.5 million tonnes of CO_{2} equivalent from both direct and indirect effects, such as spectator travel. Transport was an important component of this. To reduce the contribution of transport, all venues would be accessible by bicycle and public transport, and the transport fleet would include hybrid vehicles and hydrogen-powered buses.

In the Paris region, public transport is managed by Île-de-France Mobilités, which coordinates the contracts with transport companies such as RATP (the operator of the Paris Métro and some Réseau Express Régional (RER) lines) and SNCF (the French national railway operator). It became an official partner of the games in June 2022 to facilitate the organisation of transport. The majority of event sites were in the Paris area: 25 sites (13 in Paris and 12 in the suburbs) with 50 sessions per day for the Olympics and 17 sites (10 in Paris and 7 in the suburbs) with 18 sessions per day for the Paralympics, for 767 and 261 sessions respectively, including the two opening and closing ceremonies. These events involved 500,000 spectators per day for the Olympic Games and 300,000 for the Paralympic Games. A February 2023 fact-finding mission of the National Assembly reported that "France's success in organising the games will be judged in particular by its ability to manage the movement of people", with no fewer than 600,000 spectators, 35% of whom come from abroad, and 200,000 accredited persons having to be transported daily.

A Strategic Mobility Committee was established in October 2023 by Minister for Transport, Clément Beaune; Minister for Sports and the Olympic and Paralympic Games, Amélie Oudéa-Castéra; and Minister for People with Disabilities, Geneviève Darrieussecq. It was tasked with discussing "all transport issues for the Olympic and Paralympic Games" to ensure "the continuity and fluidity of routes, for all types of passengers, from one end of their journey to the other, accredited members, visitors to the games and everyday users." It was expected to meet every six weeks, but did not meet for the first time until December 2022, and a national mobility coordinator for the Olympic Games, Florent Bardon, was not appointed until 8 December. Bardon was the director of finance and investment programming at Gares and Connexions, a subsidiary of SNCF. Le Monde described him as the "Mr Transport" of the games.

The COVID-19 pandemic delayed work on construction sites and disrupted the transport networks, forcing a halt in recruitment, numerous resignations and increased absenteeism, which led to a significant deterioration in service by late 2022, with a quarter of the bus services not running. The effects persisted into 2024, and by early the next year nearly 10% of the RATP bus network services were not running, and only 84% of the RER C trains were on time, mainly due to the shortage of drivers at SNCF despite the resumption of driver training. In December 2023, five Métro lines (2, 3, 6, 8 and 13) still had service levels below 90%, far below the previous standard of most lines.

== Preparations ==
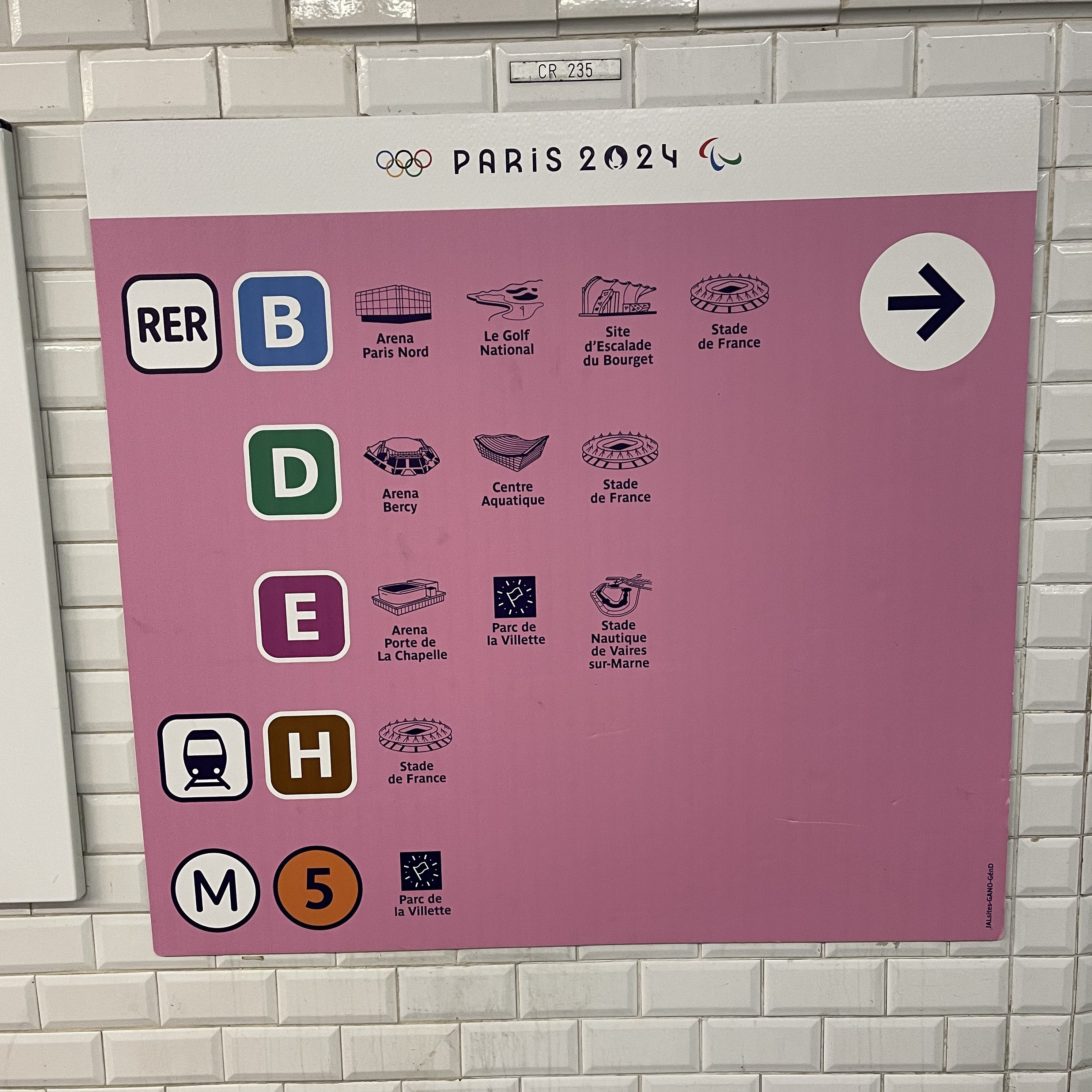
Pink wayfinding signage was displayed throughout the transport network

Over €500 million was invested in improvements to transport infrastructure for the games. The objective of the Paris Organising Committee for the 2024 Olympic and Paralympic Games (COJOP) was to allow 100% of spectators to reach the Olympic and Paralympic sites by public transport.

Engineering or improvement works in Paris are normally scheduled for the summer, resulting in service interruptions, but no works were scheduled for the summer of 2024. Construction work was "frozen" on the network from July until the end of September. Consequently, there were numerous disruptions to services in 2023 and the first half of 2024, especially on Line 14 with significant traffic interruptions over several weekends and during school holidays.

To meet the increased number of passengers on the lines compared to a normal summer, the frequency, and hours of service for public transport was increased by an average of 15%. This was concentrated in the heart of the city and particularly affected the lines serving Olympic sites such as the RER B and RER D, tramway Line T11 and Paris Métro Line 14, which were augmented by shuttle buses. During the games, visitors to Paris paid higher public transport fares to recover some of the cost of this increased level of service.

A mobile application was developed to facilitate spectator travel by offering a route calculator that could respond to delays and guide travellers onto alternative services to reduce congestion. To assist travellers, 5,000 agents, identifiable by purple vests, were deployed in the stations and at the bus stops, where special signage was affixed. Venues of the games were indicated on line maps on trains and in stations in distinctive pink.

== Security ==
Security for the Paris region transport network was coordinated by the Paris Police Prefecture, which became solely responsible for security and public order in the Île-de-France region under the Olympic law of 19 May 2023. This law broadened the scope of video surveillance images visible to SNCF and RATP agents in the Paris region transport security coordination centre.

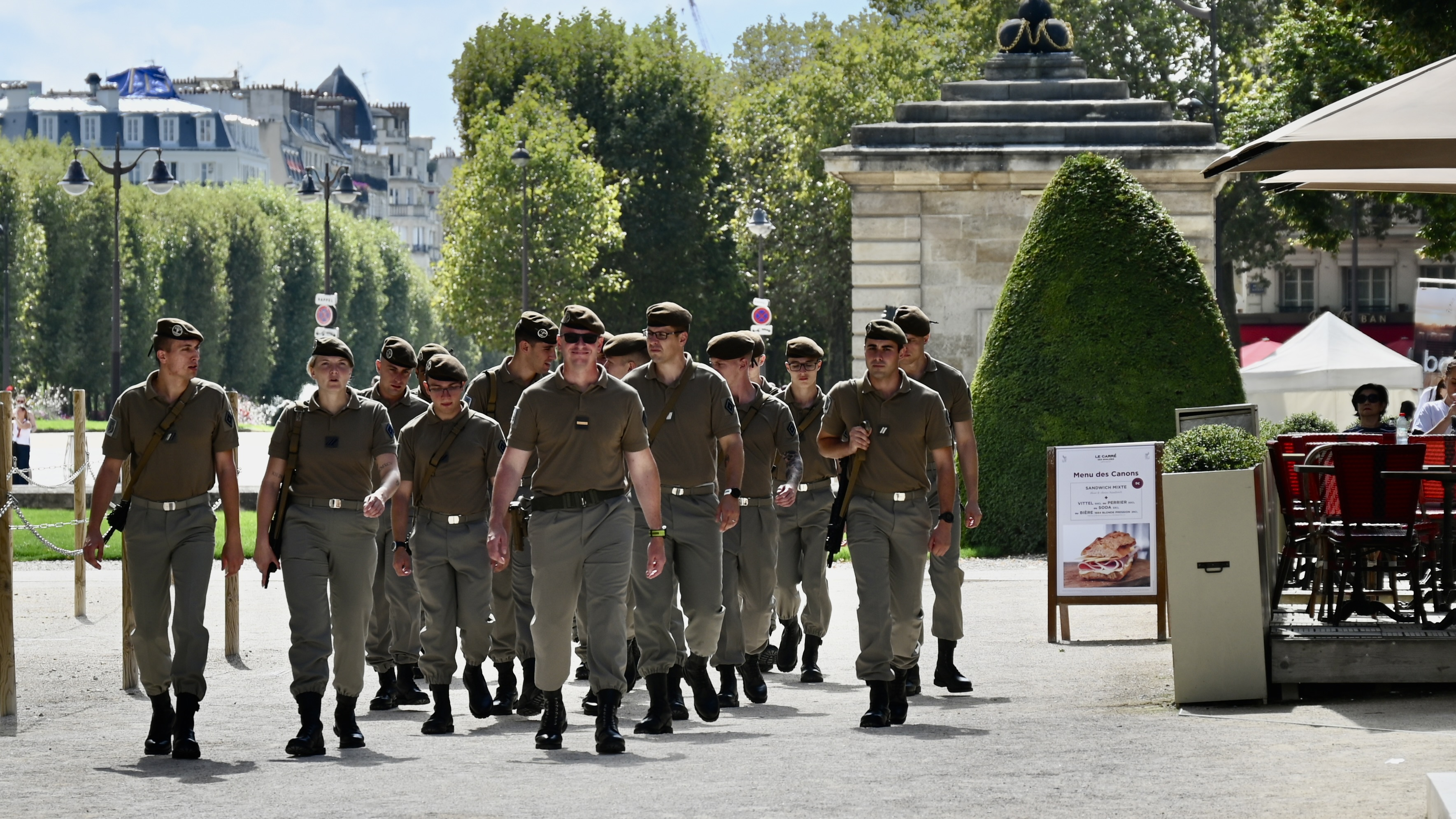
Soldiers providing security

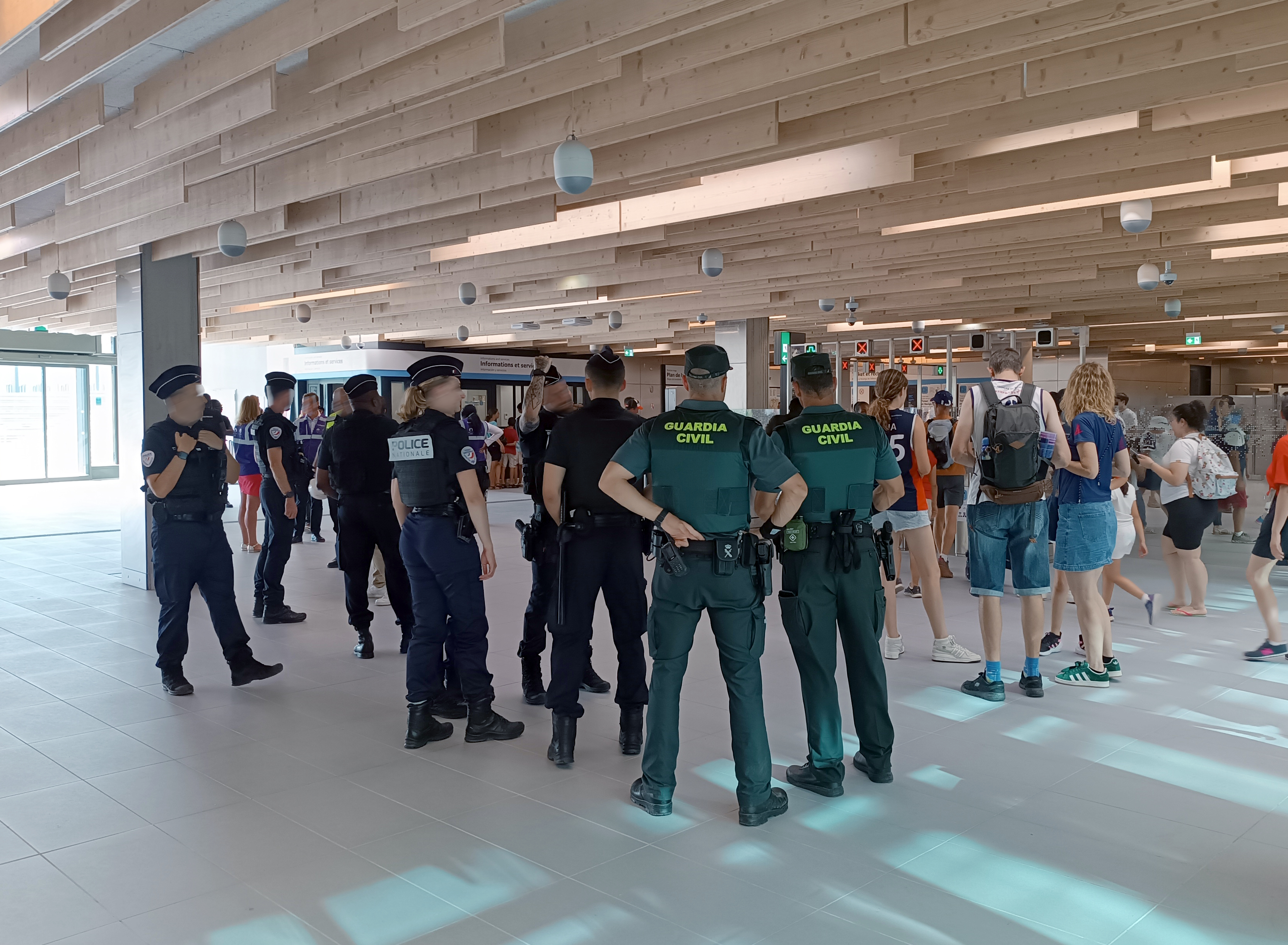
French National Police and Spanish Civil Guard at Saint-Denis–Pleyel station

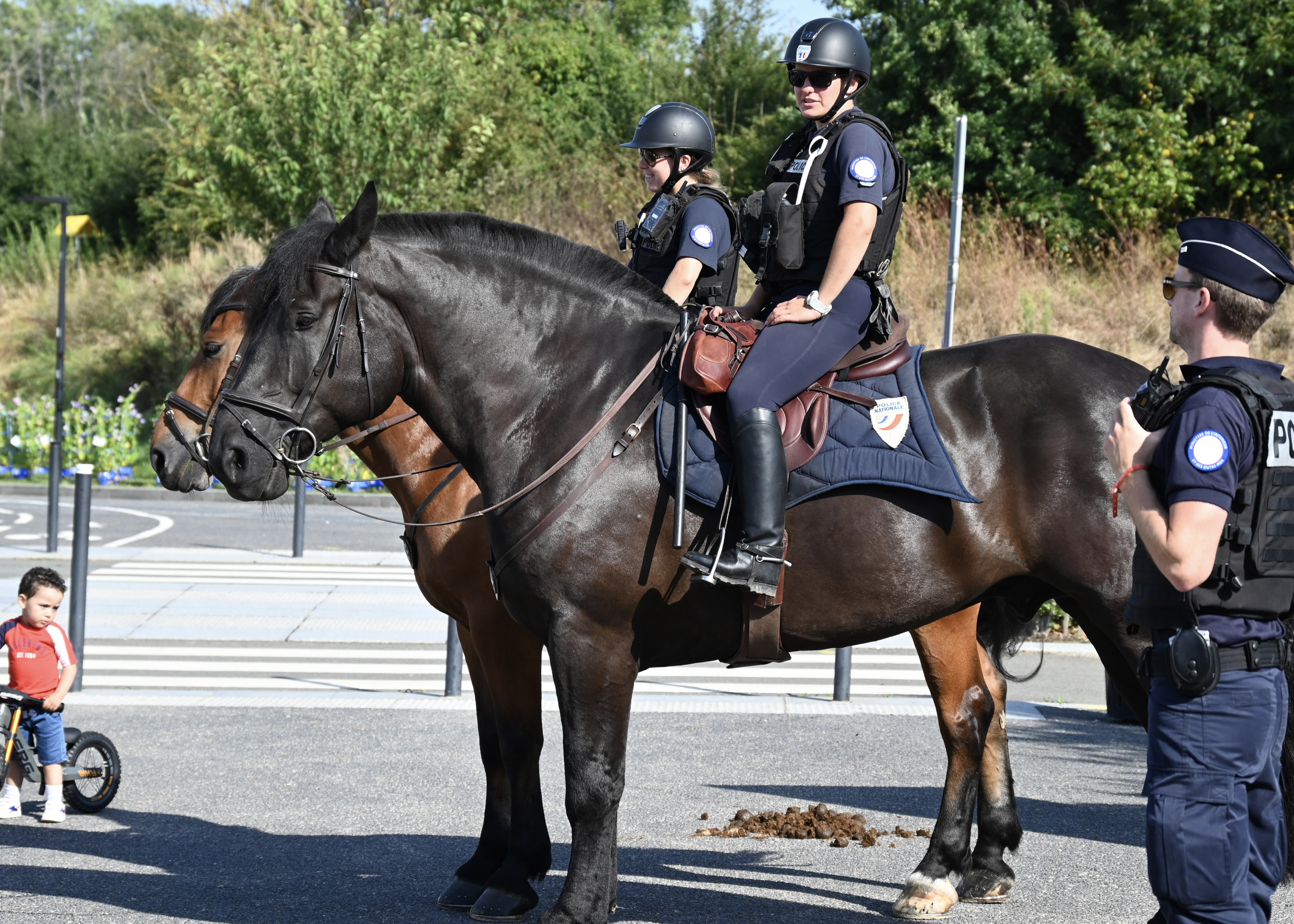
Mounted police at the Vélodrome National

Commencing in mid-2022, and for the duration of the games, transport security coordination was carried out from the Operational Security Command Center (CCOS), which brought together all stakeholders (including the police of the regional transport department, gendarmes and the security services of transport operators such as RATP, SNCF and Optile) in shared premises located at the Paris Police Prefecture headquarters. The CCOS was connected to 101,000 video surveillance cameras located throughout the various transport networks. During the Olympic Games, police patrols increased from 125 to 700 per day, with the number of transport police officers increased from 1,100 to 1,300. In addition to the 3,000 permanent security agents, another 5,000 temporary agents and more than 50 canine explosives detection units were deployed on the transport network to intervene when abandoned objects were discovered.

== Accessibility ==
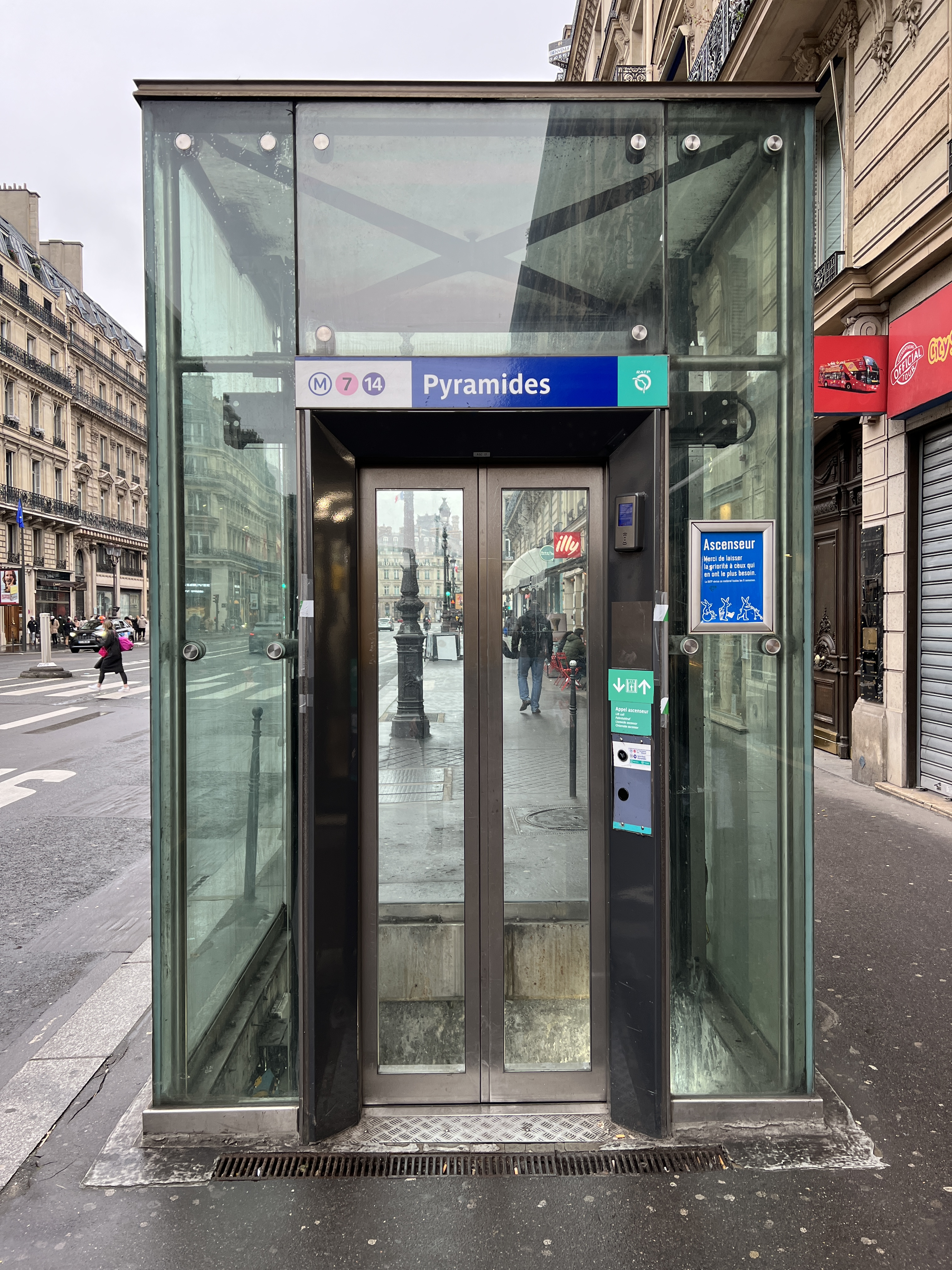
Surface elevator entrance at Pyramides Métro station

In 2023, concerns were raised regarding accessibility for the games. Lobbying group APF France Handicap said that the Paris Métro was a "big black spot on the city's Paralympic legacy". Organisers anticipated that 350,000 fans with disabilities would be visiting Paris.

The entire tramway network was accessible, as were the majority of Transilien stations. Most bus lines were accessible to people with reduced mobility, with Paris spending €25 million to upgrade bus stops and train staff on accessibility. Over 1,000 taxis accessible to people in wheelchairs were delivered prior to the games. Wheelchair-accessible shuttle buses were provided to transport spectators between venues and an accessible station, with increased service during the Paralympic Games.

The vast majority of Métro stations were not accessible to all. There are multiple obstacles to providing accessible ramps and elevators in Métro stations: much of the infrastructure is old, some stations are classified under architectural heritage rules, and there are technical difficulties with some stations. The twenty stations on Line 14 (which first opened in 1998) are fully accessible, and extensions of lines since 1992 have included elevators.

Prior to the Paralympic Games, the Île-de-France regional president, Valérie Pécresse, announced a plan to make the Métro accessible. Île-de-France Mobilités noted that this work would take around 20 years and cost between €15 and 20 billion. International Paralympic Committee president Andrew Parsons welcomed the commitment, specifically mentioning it during his speech at the Paralympics closing ceremony.

== Public transport passes ==
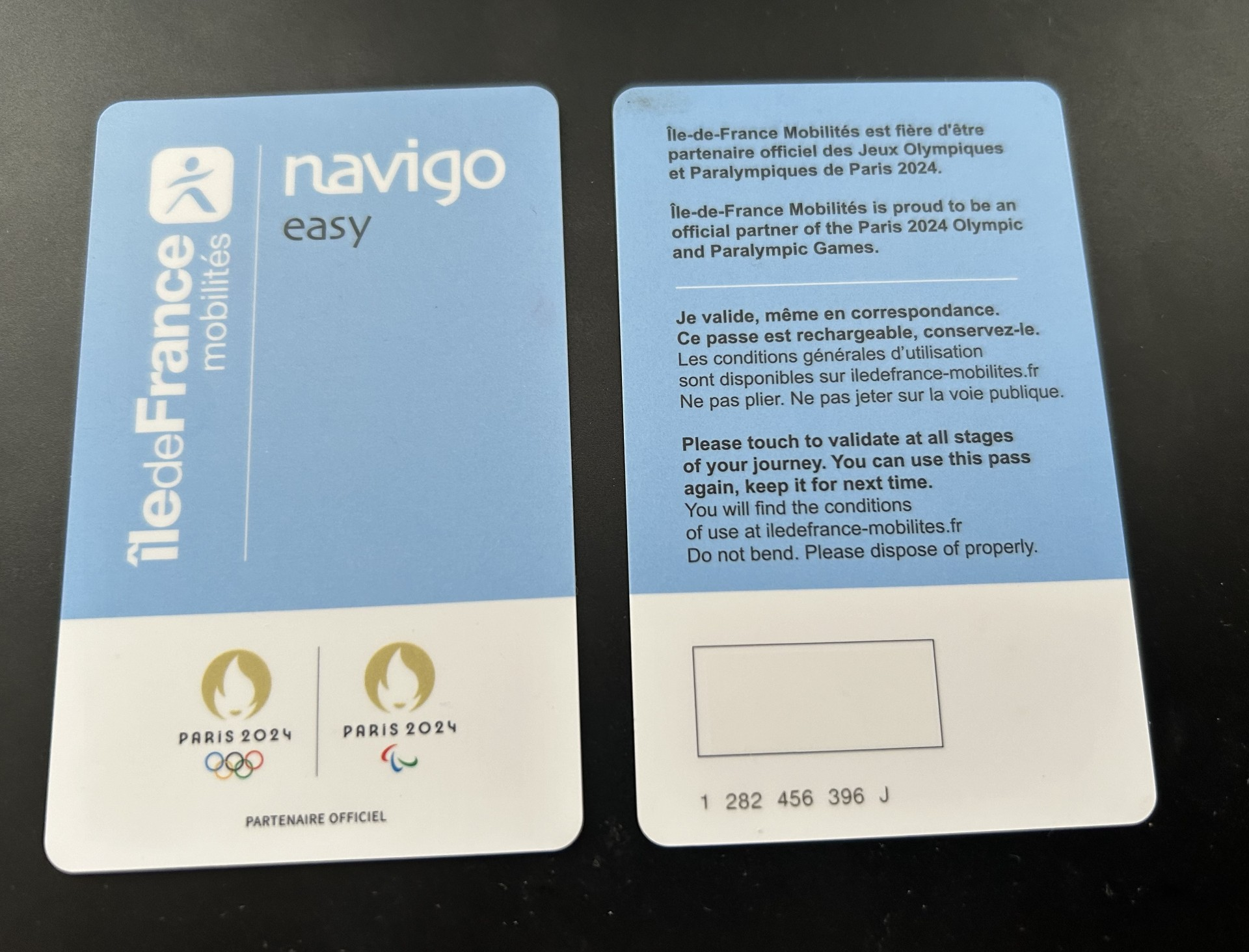
Navigo card made a partnership with the Olympic Games.

At the time of Paris's bid to host the Olympic Games, it was proposed that free public transport would be provided for ticket holders to attend the events, similar to London 2012. Following the surge in inflation in 2022, Paris 2024 dropped this proposal when their budget was revised. Île-de-France Mobilités stated that it would not give free passes to ticket holders, so Parisian commuters would not be subsidising visitors. To cover the cost of the increased services offered during the games, visitors to Paris had to pay higher fares.

From 20 July to 8 September 2024, a temporary ticket called the "Paris 2024 pass" was sold, allowing for an unlimited number of journeys in Île-de-France. The pass cost €16 for one day or €70 for a week. Over the same period, the price of certain tickets was increased: €4 for one journey, €32 for 10 journeys and €16 for a journey to/from Orly or Roissy airports. Other tourist packages were suspended, but Navigo and Navigo Liberté+ transport tickets remained unchanged for subscribers in Île-de-France.

== Rail network ==
=== Extension of the network ===
Several major public transport projects were undertaken or brought forward for the games, with extensions of existing Paris Métro and RER lines as well as new tram lines. Projects included:

- Extension of Line 4 to the south to Bagneux–Lucie Aubrac, with two new stations. This opened in January 2022.
- Extension of Line 11 to the east to Rosny–Bois-Perrier, with six new stations. This opened in June 2024.
- Extension of Line 12 to the north to Mairie d'Aubervilliers, with two new stations. This opened in May 2022.
- Extension of Line 14 to the north to Mairie de Saint-Ouen, with four new stations. This opened in December 2020.
- A further extension of Line 14 to the north to a new station at Saint-Denis–Pleyel. This opened in June 2024. A new bridge over the Paris-Lille railway lines connects the station to Stade de France–Saint-Denis on RER D, as well as to the nearby Stade de France.
- Extension of Line 14 to the south to Orly Airport, with six new stations. This opened in June 2024.
- Extension of RER E to Nanterre–La Folie station, with three new stations. This opened in May 2024.
- Four new tram lines in the Île-de-France region opened since 2020, and some existing lines were extended (such as tramway 3b to Porte Dauphine).

Métro and RER lines were also upgraded and improved, with new trains (including the MP 14 and RER NG) and Line 4 was converted to fully automated operation.

Some transport projects such as Line 15 and CDG Express (an express link to Charles de Gaulle Airport) were not completed in time for the games—with opening dates of 2026 and 2027 respectively.

=== Increased services ===
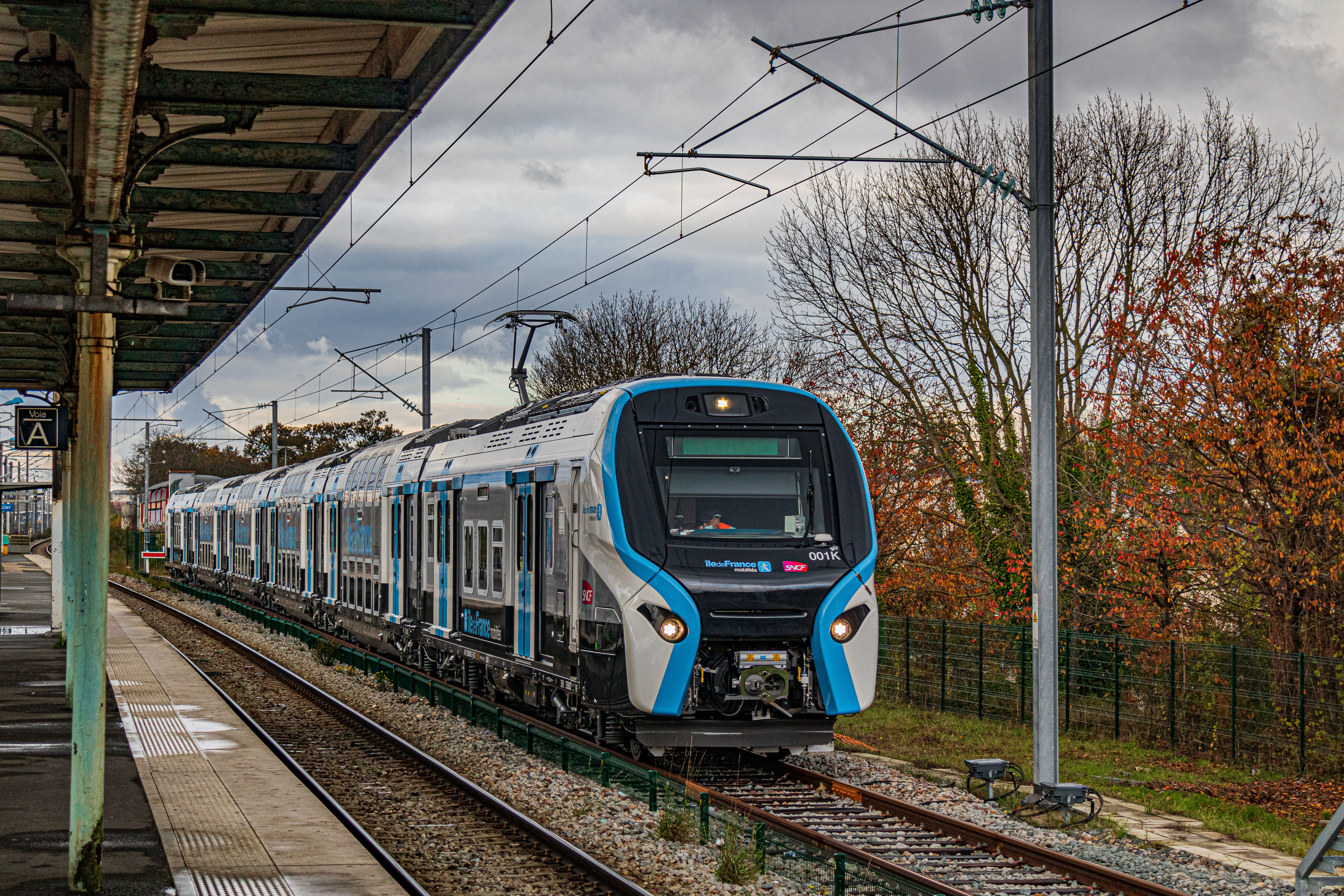
An RER NG on the RER E line

Before services were increased during the Olympics and Paralympics, they were reduced to allow drivers to take leave. The usual reduced summer service was brought forward a week. Except for RER A and B, lines K, U and R, tram lines T4, T11, T12 and T13, services were reduced by more than 10%. The reduced service was particularly noticeable on RER C and Transilien Line N, where the quarter-hourly frequency was not maintained, leading to wait times of 30 minutes at Clamart station.

During the Olympic Games period, however, the service was increased on key routes. While areas such as the south-east of Paris were not affected much by travel motivated by the Olympic Games, the busiest lines were Métro lines 8, 9, 10, 12, 13, and 14. Lines 1, 5, and 6 were also affected due to the fan zones or places of celebration that they served. On the Transilien network, lines J (Argenteuil branch), L, N, P and U were all affected, as well as the T3b tramway, the T11 and T13 tramway expresses, and RER B, C and D.

To absorb the additional passengers, services were increased by 15% compared to a normal summer. Thus, RER C, whose central section is usually closed for works over summer, saw its frequency increased to one train every five minutes. Similarly, Transilien Line J was increased between Gare Saint-Lazare and Le Stade station to serve the Yves-du-Manoir stadium in Colombes, with eight trains per hour, even during off-peak times, instead of the usual four. On Transilien Line P, there were six trains per hour to Vaires-sur-Marne, and on Line N, four trains per hour.

=== Stations ===
A project that called for a major modification of Gare du Nord station by 2024 was abandoned in favour of a scaled-down €50 million project. For Eurostar, the international high-speed rail service connecting Western Europe, the number of automatic passport readers at the Gare du Nord was increased from 5 to 10 to streamline the boarding formalities that had been lengthened by the withdrawal of the United Kingdom from the European Union. The Transilien platform escalators were modernized and the RER platforms given increased space. The Gare du Nord's forecourt was redeveloped and reserved for pedestrians, with the taxi rank transferred to the underground car parks, and the east side of the station received a new bus station and a secure bicycle hall with 1,200 spaces.

Improvements were also made to Vaires–Torcy station, which served the Vaires-sur-Marne Nautical Stadium, the venue for rowing and canoeing events, to make it accessible to people with disabilities. Accessibility and capacity works were also undertaken at Saint-Denis station. During the games, cleaning was stepped up in 120 stations impacted by the increased number of passengers.

Stations too close to the venues for festivities or competitions were closed for security reasons, most notably the Concorde and Tuileries Métro stations, Tuileries was near where the cauldron of the Olympic Games was located. The Concorde station, near the BMX freestyle, breaking, skateboarding and 3 × 3 basketball competition site at the Place de la Concorde, was closed on Line 12 from 17 May to 22 September, and access to the Concorde and Tuileries stations was suspended from 17 June to 1 September. The Champs-Élysées–Clemenceau station (lines 1 and 13), also near the Place de la Concorde, was closed from 20 July to 11 August for the Olympics, and then from 20 August to 8 September for the Paralympics. A week before the Olympic opening ceremony, around ten stations overlooking the Seine were closed.

== Cycling ==
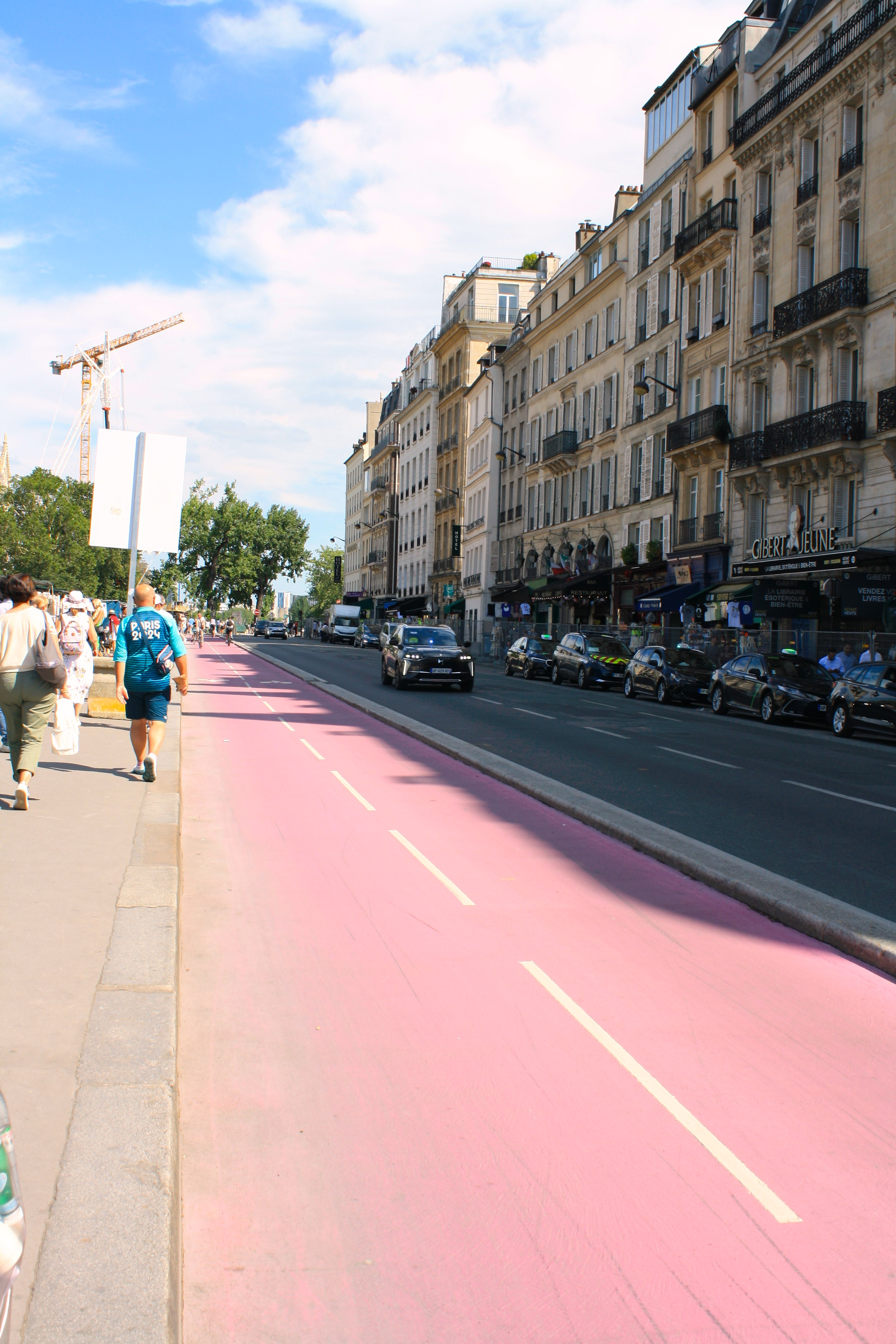
An "Olympiste" bike lane on Quai Saint-Michel

In the 20 years leading up to the games, substantial investment was made to facilitate walking and cycling in Paris, including pedestrianisation of public spaces such as the Place de la République, and the introduction of Vélib' (a bicycle sharing system) and bicycle lanes. By April 2024, cycling was more popular than driving in the centre of Paris.

New infrastructure connected to the games was initially limited, with the completion of cycle paths on the right bank of the Saint-Denis Canal and the Olympic Village footbridge. In 2022, the Collectif vélo Île-de-France pointed out that 90% of Olympic sites were not easily accessible by bicycle.

The significant growth of the use of cycling in Paris and the inner suburbs following the COVID-19 pandemic, together with fears about the reliability of the public transport network, led to the integration of cycling into the transport plan during the Olympic Games. For the games, 60 kilometres (37 mi) of cycle lanes linked all venues to each other and 27,000 temporary bicycle racks were installed.

The Société de livraison des ouvrages olympiques ("Olympic Works Delivery Company") (Solidéo) co-financed the creation of a cycling infrastructure for use during the games and afterwards, including the Dugny footbridge at Le Bourget, the Franc-Moisin footbridge at Saint-Denis, and the Olympic Village footbridge (the only one reserved for delegations during the Olympic and Paralympic Games).

Apart from the Villepinte site, all venues had cycle paths and bicycle parking facilities. The Olympic venues were accessible by 418 km (260 mi) of cycle paths, including 55 km (34 mi) of "Olympistes" cycle paths (30 in Paris and 25 in Seine-Saint-Denis) developed during the year preceding the Olympic Games. Although cycling was a recommended mode of transport during the Olympic Games, some usual routes were closed, notably at the Place de la Concorde.

== Road network ==
As with previous Olympic and Paralympic Games, the road network of Paris and the Île-de-France region had lanes of traffic reserved for accredited vehicles to guarantee journey times between the Olympic Village, venues and other destinations, such as the Main Press Centre at Palais des congrès de Paris. During the competition period, 185 kilometres (115 mi) of roads in the Paris region were partially reserved for accredited persons, transport and emergency services by the decree of 4 May 2022. Toyota supplied organisers with a fleet of vehicles that included 500 Mirai fuel cell vehicles. Some 1,000 buses were available to transport athletes and accredited personnel. Ten special shuttle routes were provided to take accredited personnel to venues remote from railways stations. A temporary bus station was built on the eastern edge of the Olympic Village to transport athletes and support staff to the competition and training sites.

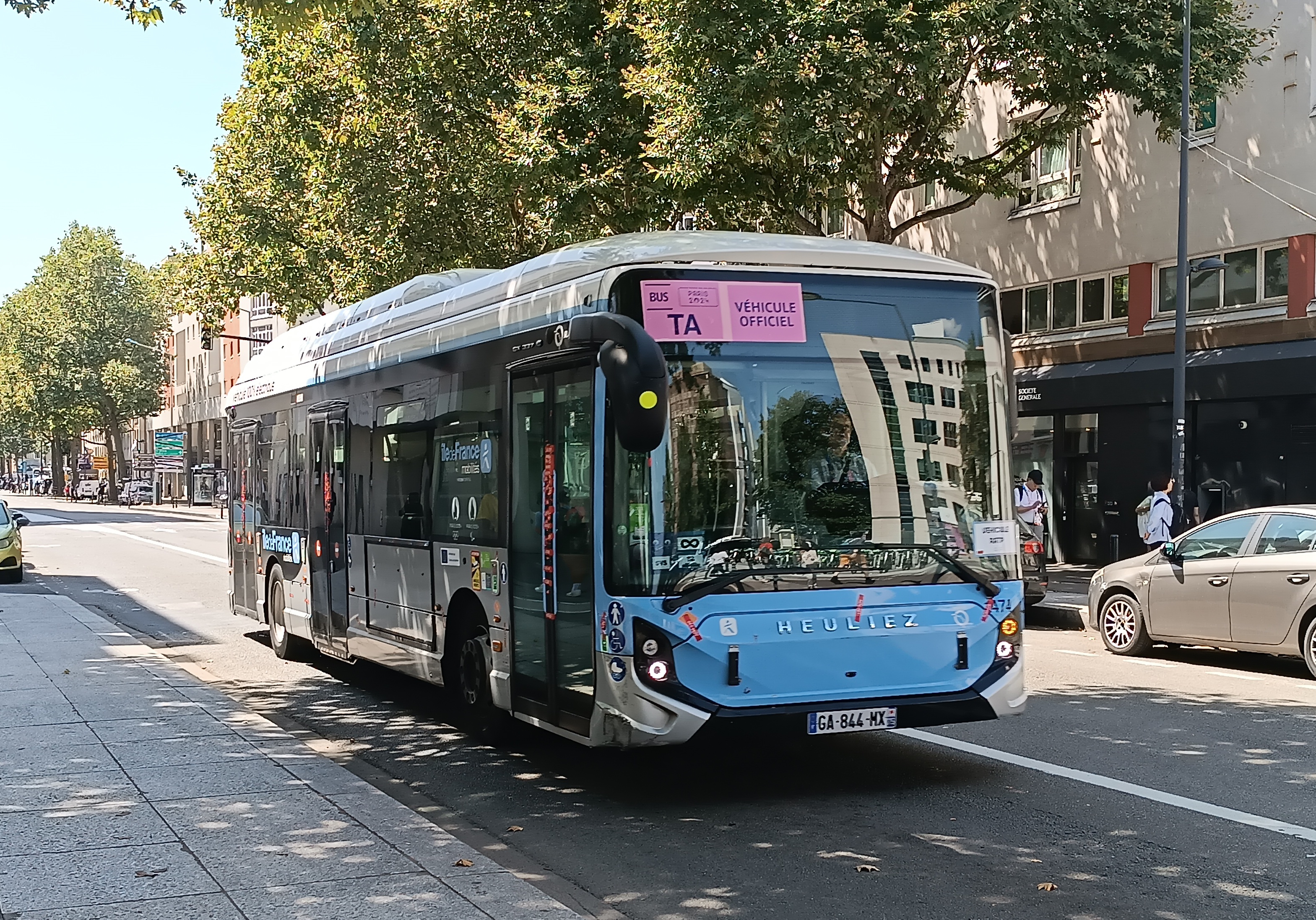
An electric Heuliez Bus from RATP assigned to a shuttle transporting athletes from the Olympic Village

Izivia, a subsidiary of Électricité de France (EDF), installed nearly 800 temporary electric charging stations, mostly near Porte Maillot, the Athletes' Village and Le Bourget. After the games, these were removed and reused by EDF at its own sites to power its electric vehicle fleet. More than 3.1 million km was driven in renewable electric Paris 2024 vehicles during the games, consumed 474 MWh. The electricity was supplied by EDF from six wind and two solar generation sites.

Compared to a normal summer, the frequency of bus services was higher during the games, but almost all routes in Paris were modified. Due to the areas occupied by the competition or celebration sites, several bus lines had to be diverted before, during, and after the Olympic Games. Sixteen bus routes were diverted for the duration of the games, starting with 10 early in the year to permit the assembly of certain installations, with six other bus routes diverted in May and then in early June.

During the Olympics, 190 bus routes (58% of the 330 RATP routes in the "central zone") had to be modified at one time or another, with simultaneous peaks of over 100 on 26 July, the day of the opening ceremony, and on 3 August for the road cycling race. The Noctilien night bus network was reinforced during the events, particularly near festive venues such as the Grande halle de la Villette, with three services per hour instead of two. Full details of traffic restrictions were not announced until March 2024, making it difficult for transport and public works companies to plan their operations for the summer of 2024.

French traffic sign warning of traffic restrictions

During the Olympic and Paralympic Games, one lane on certain roads was reserved between 06:00 and midnight for vehicles of persons accredited by COJOP, taxis, public transport vehicles, vehicles intended to facilitate the transport of persons with reduced mobility, and emergency and security vehicles. Checks were undertaken with automatic number-plate recognition, and violations of the rules were punishable by a fine of €135.

Roads with reserved lanes included the A1 autoroute from Roissy to Porte de la Chapelle, the A4 autoroute between Collégien and Porte de Bercy, the A13 autoroute between Porte Maillot and Rocquencourt, the A12 autoroute between Rocquencourt and Montigny-le-Bretonneux and route nationale 13, the Boulevard Périphérique between Porte de Sèvres and Porte de Bercy, and the Quai de Bercy.

To allow easy access to and from the Olympic Village, the A1 autoroute ramps from Place de la Porte-de-Paris to Saint-Denis were closed to general traffic. To maintain the possibility of entering and exiting the A86 autoroute, the Pleyel interchange was rebuilt with two new traffic directions.

== River network ==
The branch of the Seine which passes through the Olympic Village in Seine-Saint-Denis to the north of Paris was closed from mid-July to 8 September. River traffic was transferred to the West arm. Not normally used, the section of river required improvements to make it navigable, such as dredging and piloting facilities, at a cost of €15 million. Navigation on the Seine was prohibited around the Olympic opening ceremony on 26 July, and for open water swimming and triathlon events.

== Airports ==
Paris is served by two large international airports: Charles de Gaulle Airport and Orly Airport. Both are connected to the Paris public transport network, with the opening of the extension of Paris Métro Line 14 to Orly Airport just prior to the games. CDG Express – an express line connecting Charles de Gaulle Airport to Gare de l'Est in the city centre – was not completed in time for the games, and will open in 2027. Charles de Gaulle and Orly airports had to handle a large proportion of the arrivals and departures of 64,000 accredited persons and 47,000 items of sports equipment, including 4,000 large items such as kayaks and bicycles. The flows were massive, particularly from 18 July, the opening date of the Olympic Village, after the Olympic closing ceremony, and again before and after the Paralympic Games. Some private jets also arrived at Paris–Le Bourget Airport. For security reasons, the airspace across northern France was closed during the Olympics opening ceremony.

The organisers estimated that more than a third of the greenhouse gas emissions linked to the Olympic Games would be from the transport of athletes and spectators. While it was difficult to avoid air transport for most national delegations, the Belgian, British and Dutch national committees committed to arriving by train. To facilitate the movement of delegations from the Olympic Village to the Paris region airports, Groupe ADP (which owns and operates the Paris airports) built a baggage check-in area at the Olympic Village, so the largest bags could be transported directly to the airports.

== Disruption ==
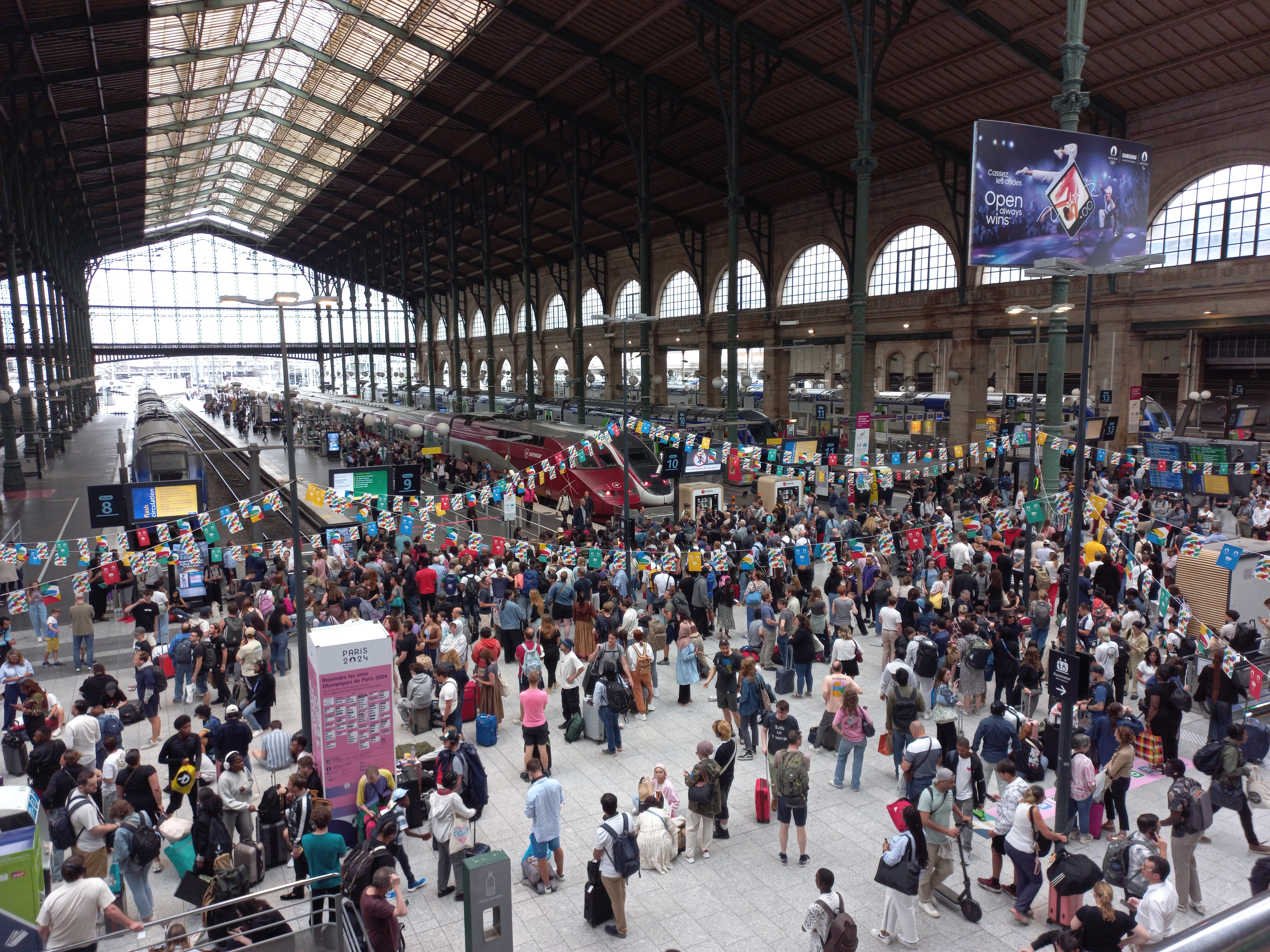
Crowds of passengers delayed by the attacks at Gare du Nord station

On 26 July 2024, the day of the opening ceremony of the 2024 Summer Olympics, a series of arson attacks damaged the LGV Atlantique, Nord, and Est lines of the French high-speed railway system. International and domestic rail services were widely disrupted, with around 800,000 passengers affected. There was also an attempted attack on the LGV Sud-Est line, though it was interrupted by TGV maintenance workers who happened to be on site.

== Events outside Paris ==
In addition to the venues in the Paris region, there were ten Olympic venues elsewhere in France. Six were soccer stadiums: Nouveau Stade de Bordeaux; Stade Geoffroy-Guichard, Saint-Étienne; Stade de la Beaujoire, Nantes; Parc Olympique Lyonnais, Lyon; Stade Vélodrome, Marseille; and the Stade de Nice. Four other events were also held outside Paris: sailing at Marseille Marina; shooting at the National Shooting Centre in Châteauroux; basketball and handball at the Stade Pierre-Mauroy in Lille; and, most incongruously of all, surfing at Teahupo'o in Tahiti. The only Paralympic event held outside Paris was the shooting at Châteauroux.

The Stade Pierre-Mauroy in Lille was an hour's train ride from Paris, plus a bus or tram ride; Line 1 (yellow) stopped outside the stadium. The marina and velodrome in Marseille could be accessed from the Rond-Point du Prado and Sainte-Marguerite Dromel métro stations on Line 2. Châteauroux was a 2 1/4-hour train ride from Paris, and had an extensive bus network. Lyon had an extensive bus and tram network, and the stadium could be accessed by the T3 or T7 Lyon tramway from Lyon-Part-Dieu station. Nice, Saint-Etienne and Bordeaux also had facilities for bicycles, with Bordeaux signposting a 7-kilometre (4.3 mi) bicycle route to the stadium.

== Outcome ==
Paris 2024's goal of halving carbon emissions was ultimately met, with an estimated 1.59 million tonnes of CO_{2} equivalent. This represented a 54.6% reduction compared to the London and Rio average. Of this, 53% of the carbon footprint (about 833,600 tonnes of CO_{2} equivalent) was incurred by people travelling to the games. This was greater than anticipated: partly because ticket sales exceeded expectations, and partly because a large number of spectators came from outside Europe. With ticket sales of €1,489 million, Paris 2024 exceeded its ticketing and hospitality revenue targets by €348 million, and generated a surplus of more than €26.8 million.

All of the venues were served by public transport, and three-quarters of those in the Île-de France region had a public transport stop within 500 metres. As a result, 87% of spectators used public transport to attend the games. The provision of 415 kilometres (258 mi) of cycling routes and 27,000 temporary bicycle places enabled 5% of spectators to cycle during the games. The transport effort was judged a success. This was attributed to the anticipation and preparation carried out over the previous eight years. Forecasts of spectator travel proved accurate, and no major incident was reported as millions of users were carried during the summer, even during the back-to-school period towards the end of the Paralympics.
