= Boughera El Ouafi =

French Algerian marathon runner (1903–1959)

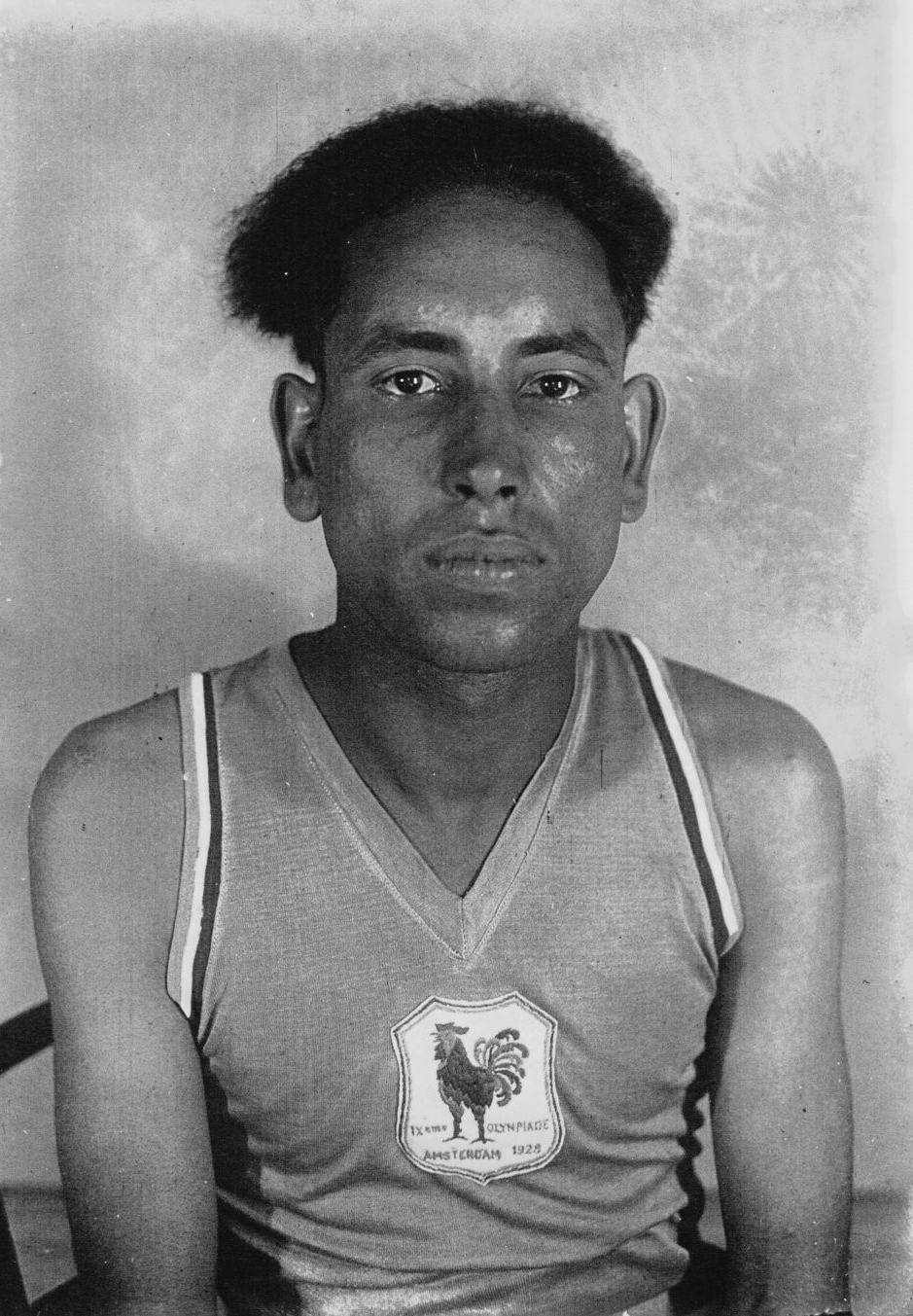
- Ahmed Boughera El Ouafi in 1928

Personal information
- National team: France
- Born: c. 1903 Ouled Djellal, French Algeria
- Died: 18 October 1959 (aged 55–56) Saint-Denis, France
- Resting place: Bobigny cemetery
- Monument: Louafi Bouguera Olympic Bridge
- Height: 170 cm (5 ft 7 in)
- Weight: 59 kg (130 lb)

Sport
- Sport: Athletics
- Event: Long-distance running
Medal record
Men's athletics
Representing France
Olympic Games
Gold medal – first place	1928 Amsterdam	Marathon

Ahmed Boughera El Ouafi (Note: His name is variously transcribed as "El Ouafi" or "Louafi" based on the Algerian Arabic pronunciation. The order of his names is occasionally swapped in French.) (Arabic: أحمد بوقرة الوافي; c. 1903 (Note: Sources vary on the year of his birth, but his great-grandniece claims that he was born in 1903.) – 18 October 1959) was a French Algerian marathon runner who represented France at the 1924 and 1928 Summer Olympics, winning gold in the latter. He was largely unacknowledged in his lifetime, facing discrimination in France due to his Algerian origin, but received posthumous recognition.

== Early life ==
Boughera El Ouafi was born in the town of Ouled Djellal in French Algeria in 1903. Prior to World War I, he won many local races in Algeria and earned the nickname "the flying Berber". He was drafted into the 25th Infantry Regiment of the French Army in late 1918; however, the war ended soon after and he never saw combat.

== Athletic career ==
Because he had no family or job to return to in Algeria, El Ouafi chose to stay in the French Army for five more years. He was stationed in French-occupied Germany. While in Germany, a lieutenant arranged for him to compete in the 1923 military athletics championships in mainland France. The French Athletics Federation noticed his performance and requested he participate in the 1924 Olympic marathon. He finished the marathon seventh overall and first among the French athletes.

El Ouafi was illiterate, and he became a factory worker at Renault in Boulogne-Billancourt near Paris after finishing his military service. In Boulogne-Billancourt, he was trained by French athlete Louis Corle and won multiple long-distance races. He won the 1928 Paris-Melun Marathon, thus qualifying for the 1928 Olympic marathon. In the 1928 Summer Olympics, he ran behind the leaders for the first three quarters of the race, overtaking them about 5 kilometers before the end. He finished first, 26 seconds ahead of the silver medalist Manuel Plaza from Chile. El Ouafi was the only representative of French athletics to win gold at the 1928 Olympics. The Association of Road Racing Statisticians lists El Ouafi as the best marathon runner of 1928.

Because he was an Algerian, French media downplayed his victory, treating it as unexpected and ironic. Some journalists, such as Victor Breyer, presented El Ouafi's victory as evidence of European French superiority over colonial minorities, as he was trained in mainland France. In response to El Ouafi's victory, the newspaper L'Humanité sarcastically wrote, "Finally, a French victory!", calling attention to the fact that most French people did not consider him to really be French. He received more positive press in the United States, with Marcus Garvey's newspaper Negro World writing that El Ouafi was proof that "Scattered to the ends of the earth, and nowhere more numerous than in Africa, are men and women who, beyond a doubt, are capable of surpassing the best feats of Nordics on track or field". The American and Mexican newspapers New York Herald Tribune, New York Times, and El Universal cited the performance of El Ouafi, as well as those of his competitors from Chile and Japan, as proof that Nordicism was scientifically baseless and that common beliefs of European ethnic superiority were false.

After his surprise victory, El Ouafi was offered a chance to tour the United States. He ran ten marathons and ten 25-kilometer races in the United States over a period of five months between September 1928 and January 1929. However, the money he earned on this trip disqualified him as an amateur athlete, forcing him to leave the sport. El Ouafi's disqualification was considered an example of "Siki syndrome", in reference to when the French Boxing Federation disqualified the African boxer Battling Siki under dubious pretexts because he outperformed his white competitors.

== Later life and death ==
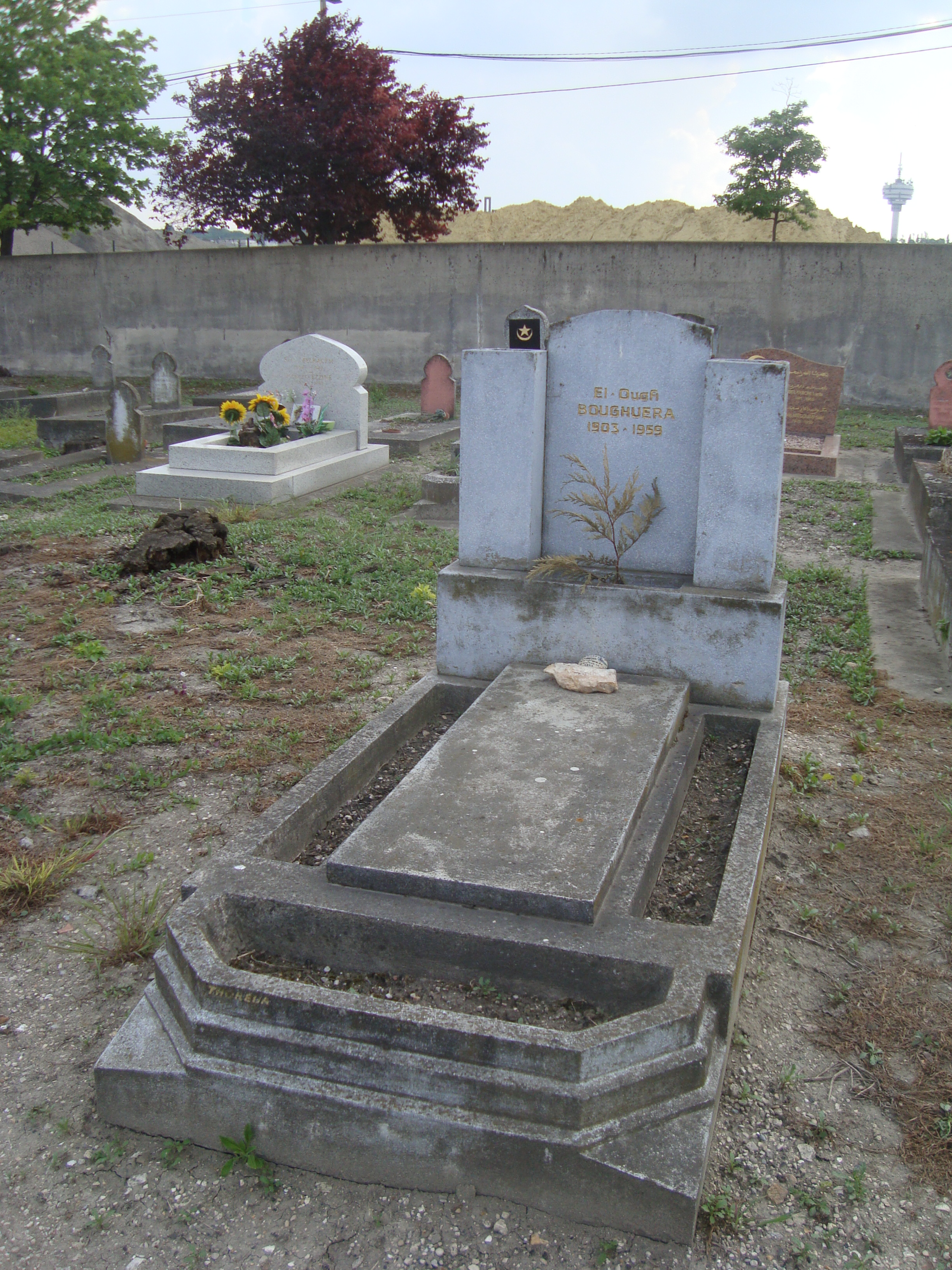
El Ouafi's grave in the Bobigny cemetery

El Ouafi used the money he earned in the United States to buy a café in Paris. This business soon faced bankruptcy. He worked various jobs such as waiting and manual labor before becoming unemployed. His destitution was met with indifference from the French public. El Ouafi remained forgotten by the public until the 1956 Summer Olympics, when the Algerian runner Alain Mimoun also won the marathon. Reporters went to seek out the other Algerian who had won 28 years earlier and found him in poverty. When Mimoun returned to France, he was invited by René Coty to the Élysée Palace and he invited El Ouafi as his guest. Mimoun gave El Ouafi some money and helped him get a job as a doorkeeper at a stadium.

There are differing accounts of the circumstances surrounding El Ouafi's death. According to one account, on 18 October 1959, El Ouafi attended a family meeting at 10 Landis Street in Saint-Denis to discuss the inheritance of his nephew. For reasons unknown, the meeting escalated into violence, and El Ouafi was shot and killed. A different account says that he was assassinated by the Algerian National Liberation Front (FLN) because he refused to support the group. His great-grandniece, Jasmine Zeroug, has stated that the circumstances of his death are not entirely known, but that the FLN was likely responsible. He was buried at the Bobigny cemetery in a funeral paid for by the French National Olympic and Sports Committee.

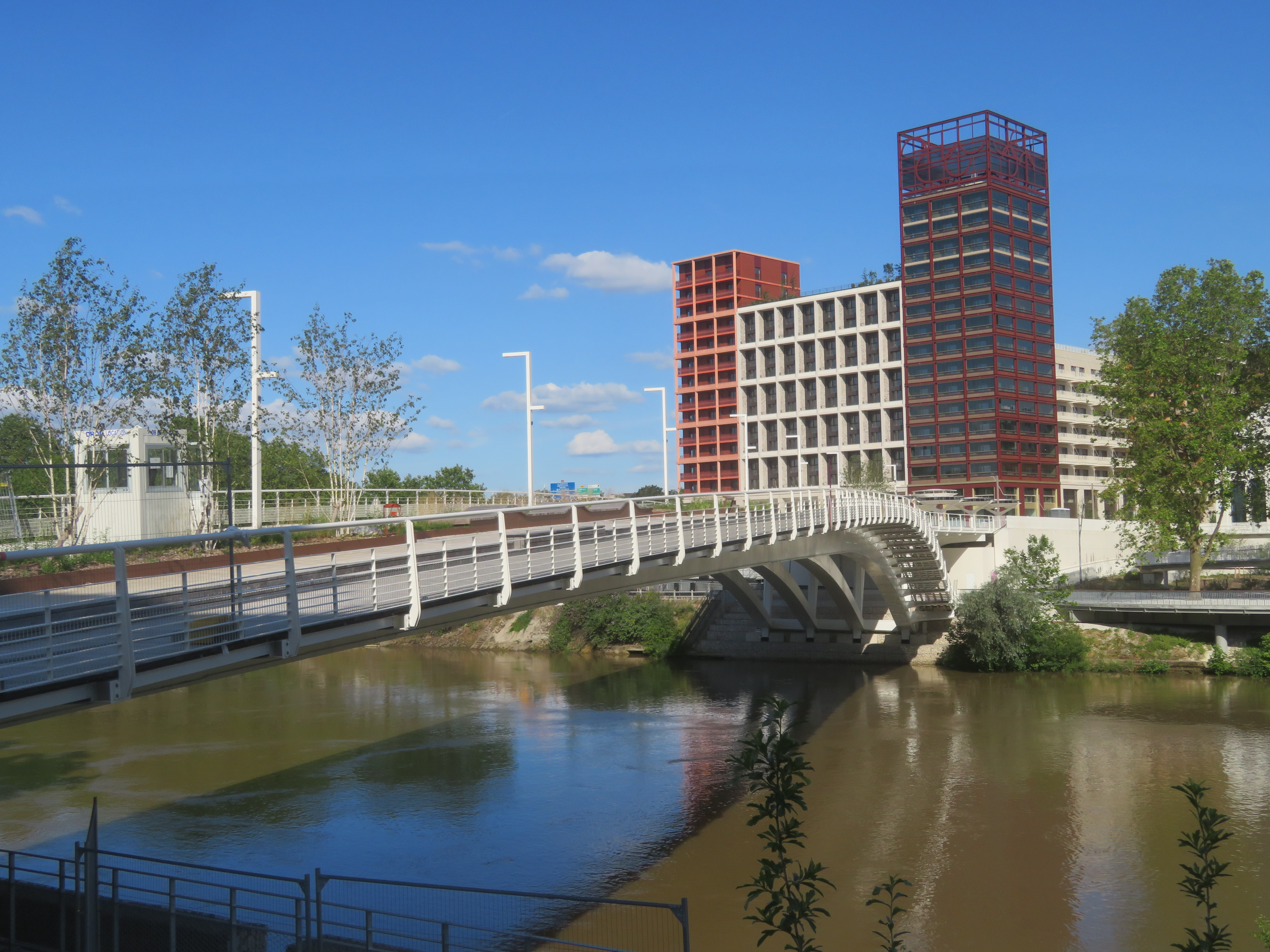
The Louafi Bouguera Olympic Bridge was named in his honor in 2024.

El Ouafi was largely ignored and forgotten in France during his lifetime. He had received more coverage from the American press in the few months he toured the United States than from the French press in his entire life, although he gained some recognition in the 1990s when the newspaper L'Humanité mentioned him as an example of a North African successfully integrating into European French society. In the 1990s, a stadium in La Courneuve and an avenue near the Stade de France were named in his honor. The Louafi Bouguera Olympic Bridge in the Paris Olympic Village was named in his honor in 2024. Stéphane Troussel stated that the bridge was named "to honor the memory of this largely unknown Franco-Algerian figure, whose name has been deliberately erased by discrimination, racism and colonization".

== See also ==
- France at the 1924 Summer Olympics
- France at the 1928 Summer Olympics
- List of 1928 Summer Olympics medal winners
