= Louafi Bouguera Olympic Bridge =

Pedestrian and cyclist bridge in Paris, France

Louafi Bouguera Olympic Bridge Pont olympique Louafi Bouguera
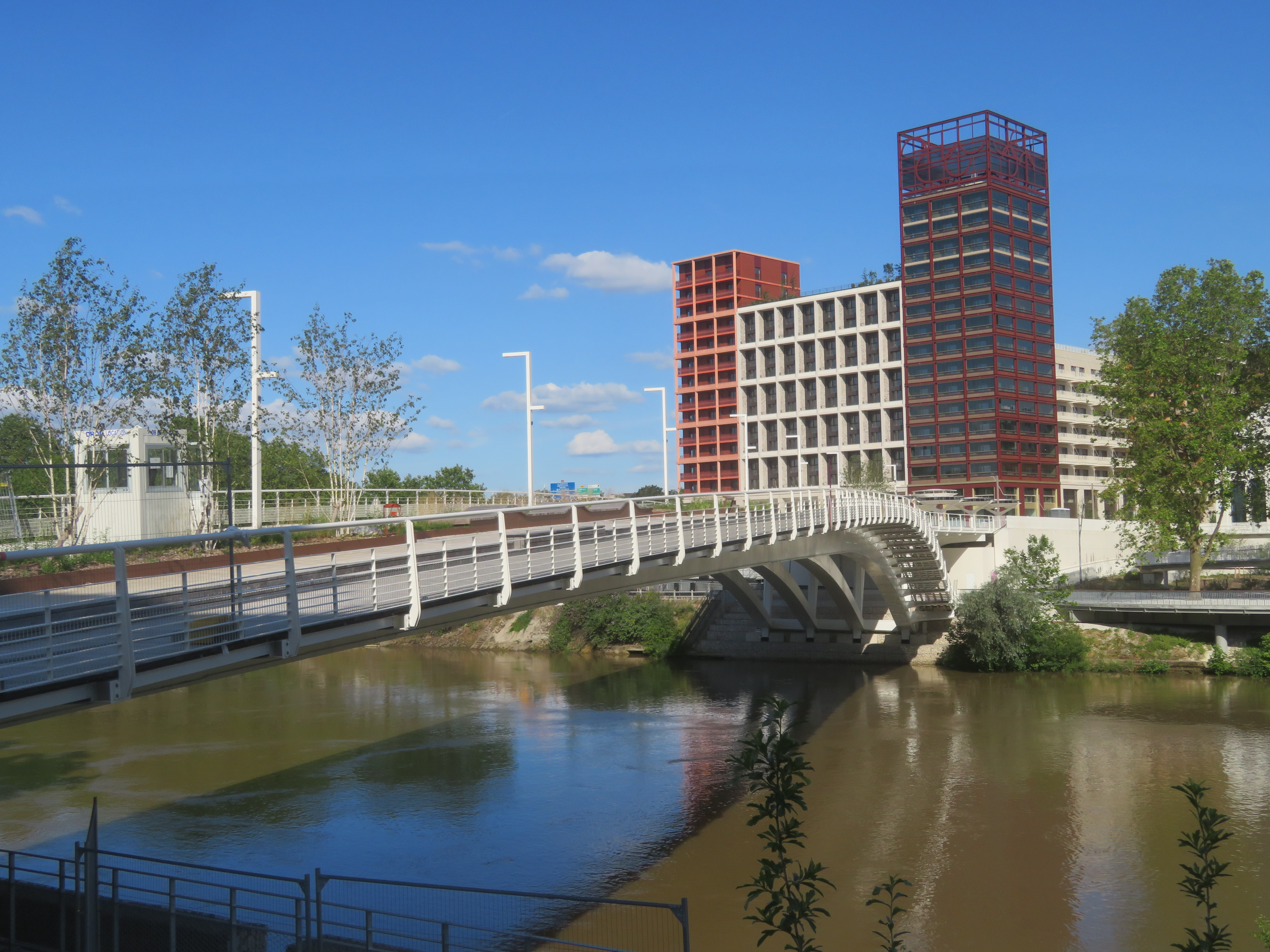
- The Louafi Bouguera Olympic Bridge seen from Île-Saint-Denis
- Coordinates: 48°55′31″N 2°20′06″E

Characteristics
- Total length: 138 m
- Height: 16 m

History
- Designer: Thomas Lavigne

Location
- Interactive map of Louafi Bouguera Olympic Bridge

The Louafi Bouguera Olympic Bridge (also known as the Olympic Village footbridge, French: Pont olympique Louafi Bouguera) is a pedestrian and cyclist bridge connecting the French municipalities of Saint-Denis and L'Île-Saint-Denis. It is named in honor of the French Algerian Olympic athlete Boughera El Ouafi.

== Location ==
The Louafi Bouguera Olympic Bridge is 138 metres long and 16 metres wide. It connects the two parts of the Olympic Village in Saint-Denis in France. It crosses the large arm of the Seine and connects Saint-Denis to L'Île-Saint-Denis. It overlooks the river and provides direct access to the redeveloped shore of the redeveloped Quai de Saint-Ouen in Saint-Denis and the Quai du Châtelier in L'Île-Saint-Denis.

== Design and construction ==
The architect of the bridge was Thomas Lavigne, who also designed the Jacques-Chaban-Delmas bridge in Bordeaux, France. Urban architect Cécilia Amor designed its layout. The bridge was assembled at the port of Gennevilliers between April and October 2022 and transported to its site by barge. The 1,500-tonne steel structure, which had been resting on two pairs of steel pillars on the banks of the Seine, was loaded onto the barge on 18 October with the assistance of 96-wheel mobile cranes. This operation took five hours to complete. The barge made the 9-kilometre voyage to the site between 25 and 7 October, and was installed on the night of 28/29 October.

The construction of the bridge required 9,000 m^{3} of concrete. To minimize the carbon footprint, the concrete was manufactured within 1 km of the construction site and 88% was low-carbon. The bridge also required 3,400 tonnes of steel, of which 11% was recycled metal. Half the 17,000 tonnes of spoil was removed by barge. Surrounding the bridge was 2,625 m^{2} of vegetation, and some 74 new trees were planted. Local and resistant plants requiring little water were chosen. Rainwater was managed without discharge into the storm water networks, and variable-intensity LED lighting was used to conserve energy. The bridge cost €32.1 million, of which 90% was provided by the Société de livraison des ouvrages olympiques ("Olympic Works Delivery Company") (Solideo), and 10% provided by the Métropole du Grand Paris.

The bridge was one of five built for the 2024 Summer Olympics, the others being with the one connecting the Paris Olympic Aquatic Centre and the Stade de France, the two footbridges over the Saint-Denis Canal (the Lucie-Bréard footbridge between the Franc-Moisin district and the Stade de France district, the Pierre-Larousse link in Aubervilliers, which connects the Josette and Maurice-Audin Quays on the left bank, to the Gambetta quay, on the right), and a footbridge at Le Bourget over the A1 autoroute.

After the Olympic and Paralympic Games, the bridge was opened to residents of the municipalities it connects. It is now called the Louafi Bouguera Olympic Bridge and was officially inaugurated on 7 December 2024. Louafi Bouguera was the first Franco-Algerian athlete to win an Olympic gold medal by winning the marathon at the 1928 Summer Olympics in Amsterdam. He was shot dead in Saint-Denis in 1959 during the Algerian War.
