= Olympic Village (Paris) =

Paris Olympic Village Village olympique de Paris
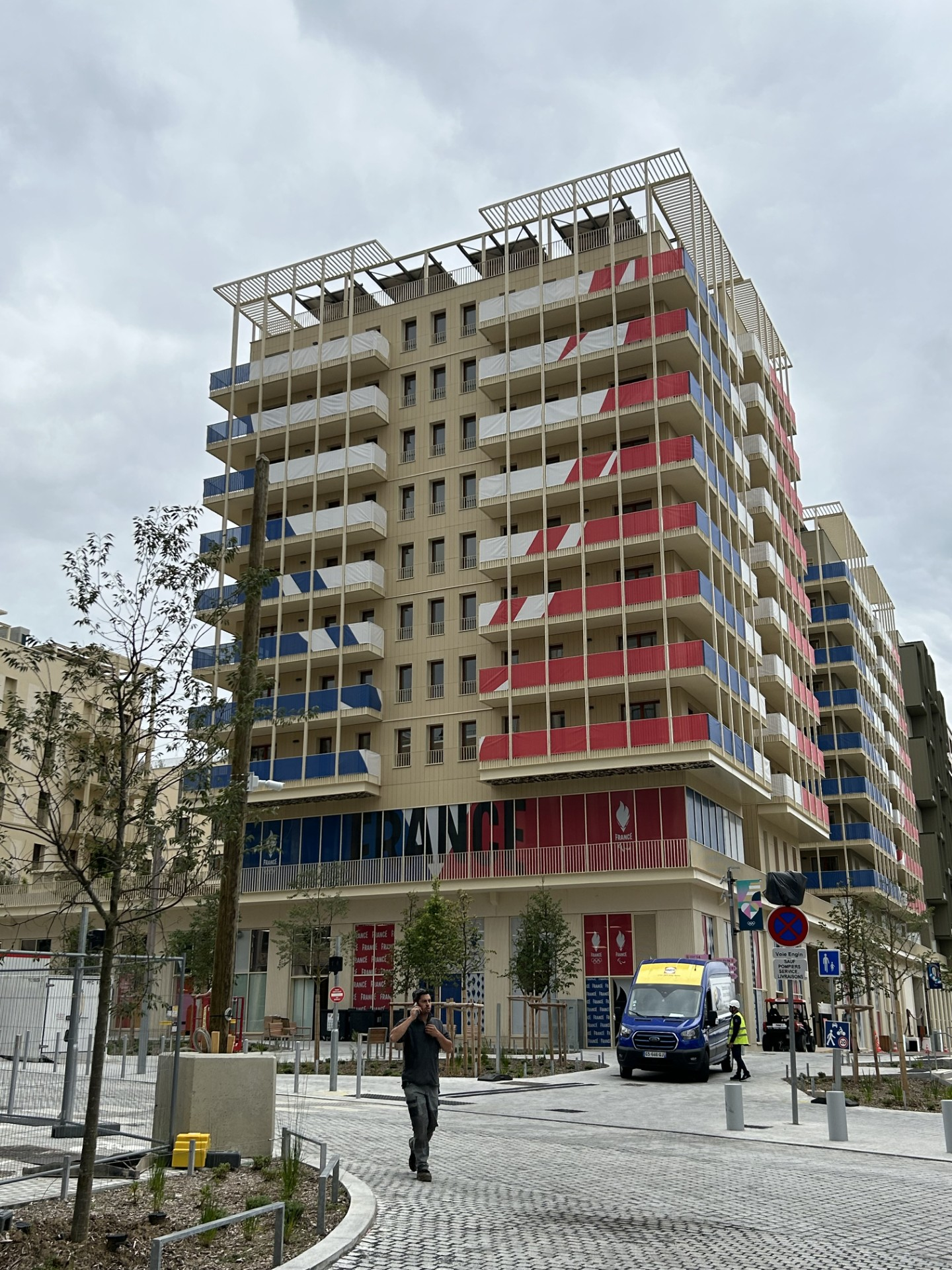
- French delegation building in July 2024

- Paris Olympic village
- Coordinates: 48°55′30″N 2°20′15″E
- Country: France
- Region: Ile-de-France
- Communes: Saint-Ouen-sur-Seine, Saint-Denis, L'Île-Saint-Denis

Area
  - Total: 46 ha (110 acres)
- Paris Métro: Saint-Denis–Pleyel; (in 2027); (in 2031); (Unknown)

The Paris Olympic Village is an Olympic village in Île-de-France specially built to host athletes during the 2024 Summer Olympic and Paralympic Games in Paris. It extends into the commune of Saint-Ouen-sur-Seine, Saint-Denis and L'Île-Saint-Denis. The site was designed by architect Dominique Perrault to accommodate the 14,500 Olympic athletes and 9,000 Paralympic athletes and their technical staff between 26 July and 8 September 2024.

The village is located approximately 1.3 kilometres (0.81 mi) from the Saint-Denis–Pleyel station, which is the terminus of Paris Métro Line 14. The village includes the Olympic Village footbridge over the Seine designed by the architects Thomas Lavigne and Cecilia Amor that connects the island to the Cité du Cinéma.

== Site selection ==
Saint-Denis–Pleyel station, the heart of the Grand Paris Express plan, was chosen as the site for the Paris 2024 Olympic village. There was no longer space in Paris proper to develop a district of this type, so Saint-Denis was favored due to its proximity to sports venues such as the Stade de France and the new Paris Aquatic Centre 2 kilometres (1.2 mi) away. The Olympic village was located primarily on the municipal territory of Saint-Denis, but with some parts in Saint-Ouen-sur-Seine and L'Île-Saint-Denis.

At the time of selection, the area was a disused industrial area. The site has at its centre the halls of the Cité du Cinéma, a film studio complex. Its transport services are of good quality, being serviced by the A86 autoroute, Mairie de Saint-Ouen station on Paris Métro lines 13 and 14, and from 24 June 2024, Saint-Denis–Pleyel station on line 14. Saint-Denis–Pleyel station is planned to be connected to lines 16 and 17 by 2027, and line 15 by 2031. The district was not designed to be ephemeral, but to be converted to housing after the Games.

== Design ==
The Athletes' village was designed by the French architect and urban planner Dominique Perrault. Construction symbolically began on 4 November 2019 with the then-Prime Minister, Édouard Philippe, and the Mayor of Paris, Anne Hidalgo, initiating the work. The Société de livraison des ouvrages olympiques ("Olympic Works Delivery Company", known as Solideo) was responsible for construction, with a deadline date of 1 March 2024 for when the village had to be handed over to the Paris Organising Committee for the 2024 Olympic and Paralympic Games. The time allocated for the works was therefore five years, whereas a project of this magnitude usually requires twice that.

For Solideo, the Olympic Games developments were guided by the principles of legacy and exemplarity. The main objectives included reducing the carbon footprint, reusing and recycling construction site materials, ensuring urban comfort, and promoting respect for and preservation of biodiversity. Companies were encouraged to propose and experiment with innovations. A quarter of Solideo's 64 construction sites were linked to the Athletes' village. A law passed on 26 March 2018 providing for the organization of the 2024 Olympic and Paralympic Games created exceptions to town planning laws in accordance with the government commitments made to the International Olympic Committee.

The village was designed to accommodate 14,500 athletes in nearly 3,000 apartments spread across 82 residential buildings. The site extends over 46 hectares and is divided into four sectors: Universeine in Saint-Denis, a pre-existing site developed by Vinci Immobilier; Les Quinconces, in Saint-Ouen, entrusted to a Caisse des dépôts et consignations (CDC) consortium of Icade, CDC, and CDC Habitat; Les Belvédères, in Saint-Ouen, awarded to a Nexity-Eiffage Immobilier-CDC Habitat consortium; and the L'Île-Saint-Denis eco-district by an Arcadis–Pichet Legendre partnership.

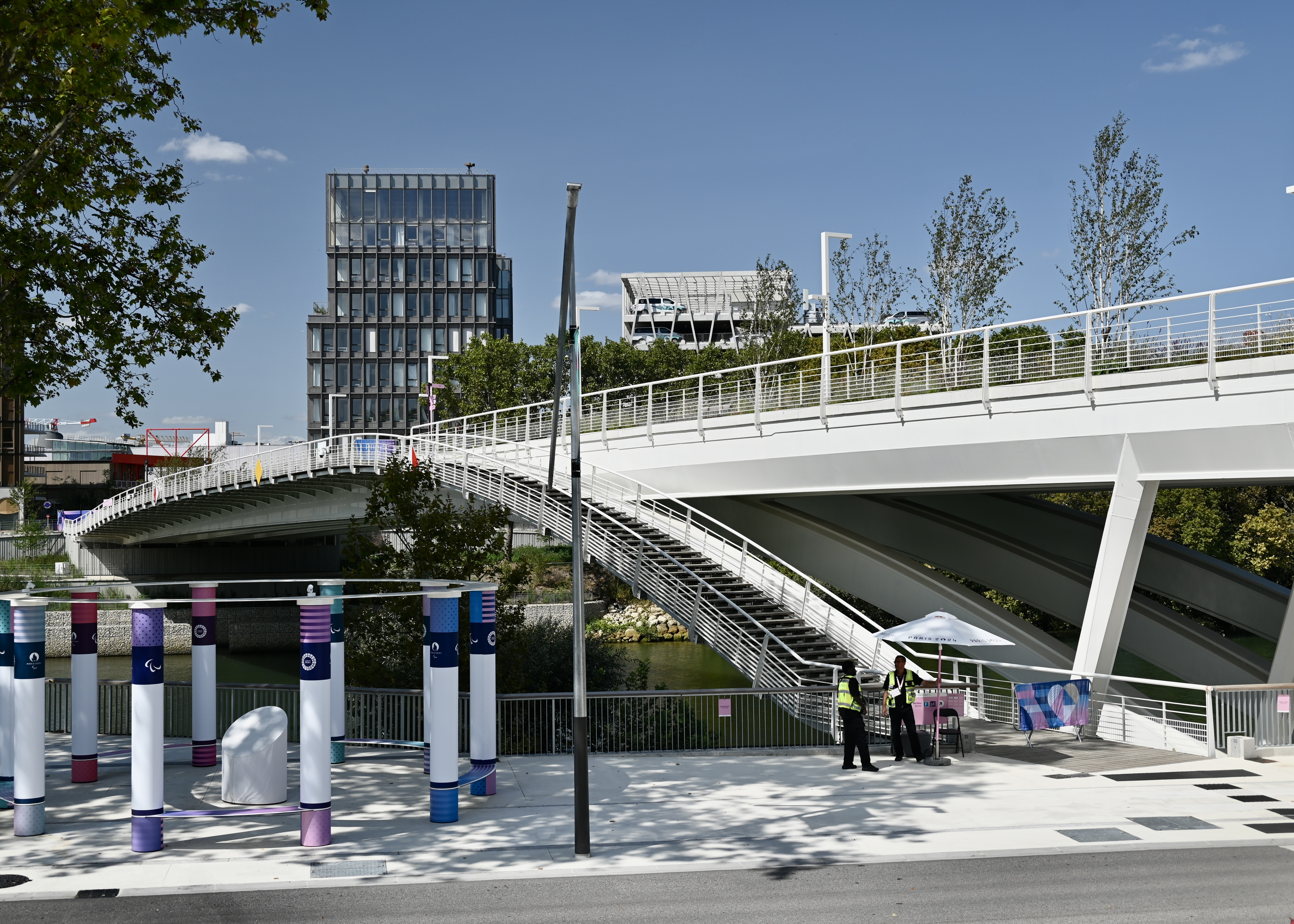
The Olympic Village footbridge over the Seine

The Cité du Cinéma was temporarily transformed during the games into a 3,300-seat restaurant with a capacity of 60,000 meals per day. The Athletes' village was connected by the Olympic Village footbridge across the Seine, designed by the architects Thomas Lavigne and Cecilia Amor. The footbridge is at ground level on the Pleyel side; a wide spiral ramp on the Place Olympique provides access to the banks of the Seine. Because the village had to house Paralympians as well as Olympians, the entire site was made fully wheelchair accessible, with generous spaces allowing for two wheelchairs to pass each other in a corridor; this exceeded French law, which only required that 20% of a housing project had to meet accessibility standards.

== Construction ==
Work commenced with the expropriation and relocation of the remaining businesses still on the site, with existing structures razed in order to level the land. The construction site employed 1,400 to 1,900 workers and 37 cranes daily between 2021 and 2023, making it one of the largest urban construction sites in Europe at the time. The Seine was used for the movement of most materials to and from the construction site. This included the removal of 210,000 tonnes of earth and rubble, but 90% of the material generated by demolition work was reused. The village's 350 street lamps, designed by Concepto and Studio 5•5, were made using salvaged components. Each was angled, with a high end for illuminating the road, positioned high enough for tall vehicles to pass, and a lower one for pedestrian lighting.

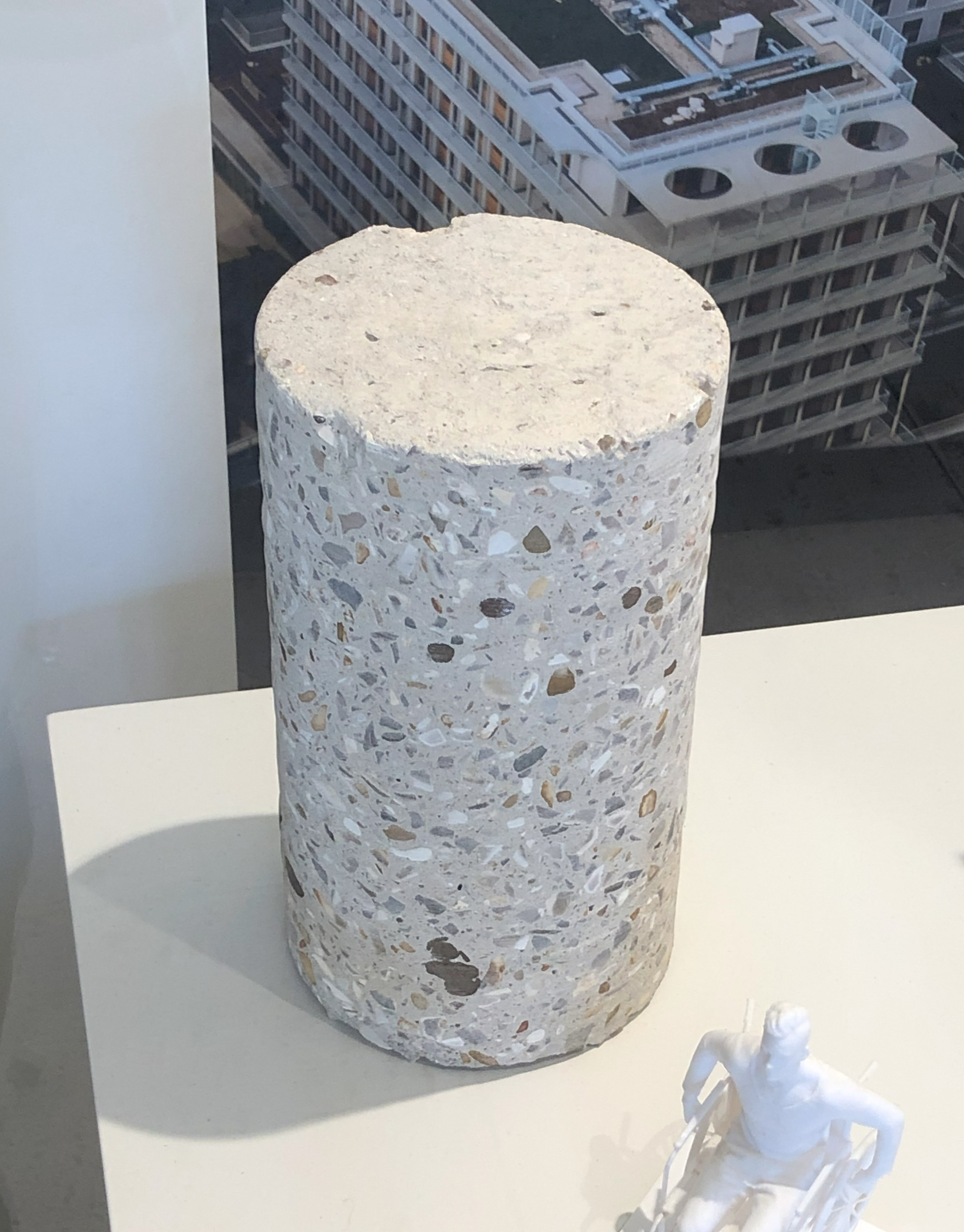
Ultra-low carbon concrete core from the construction of the Athletes' village

Paris 2024 set an ambitious target (which it exceeded) of reducing by half the carbon footprint of the Games compared to the London and Rio Games average. At the Athletes' village, the goal was to reduce the greenhouse gas emissions by 30% compared with regular construction methods. Wood was preferred as a construction material, with 16 of the 22 buildings on L'Île-Saint-Denis having a wooden frame. All residential structures under 28 metres in height used wooden structural elements such as beams, columns, and floors. All of the 16,000 m^{3} of wood used was sourced from eco-managed forests, with at least 30% coming from France, and no tropical wood was used. Vinci Immobilier made much use of low-carbon concrete, with less than 150 kg of CO_{2} per m^{3}, and ultra low-carbon concrete, with less than 100 kg of CO_{2} per m^{3}, compared with 250 kg of CO_{2} per m^{3} for conventional concrete.

The village was designed with the climatic conditions of 2050 in mind. Extensive gardens covered 40 percent of the area, with 9,000 trees and shrubs planted, and there was a six-hectare park. A treatment system recovered waste water for irrigation and cooling. The design of the buildings allowed for air circulation through natural summer ventilation. The village layout had long, straight gaps between buildings that led down to the Seine, allowing cool air from the river to travel inland. Five huge outdoor air filters developed by the French company Aérophile removed 95% of particulate matter from the air, filtering 30 m^{3} of air per second while using very little electricity. In addition, 1,500 housing units were equipped with Teqoya VMC (controlled mechanical ventilation) systems that can capture 90% of microparticles, bacteria, pollens and allergens.

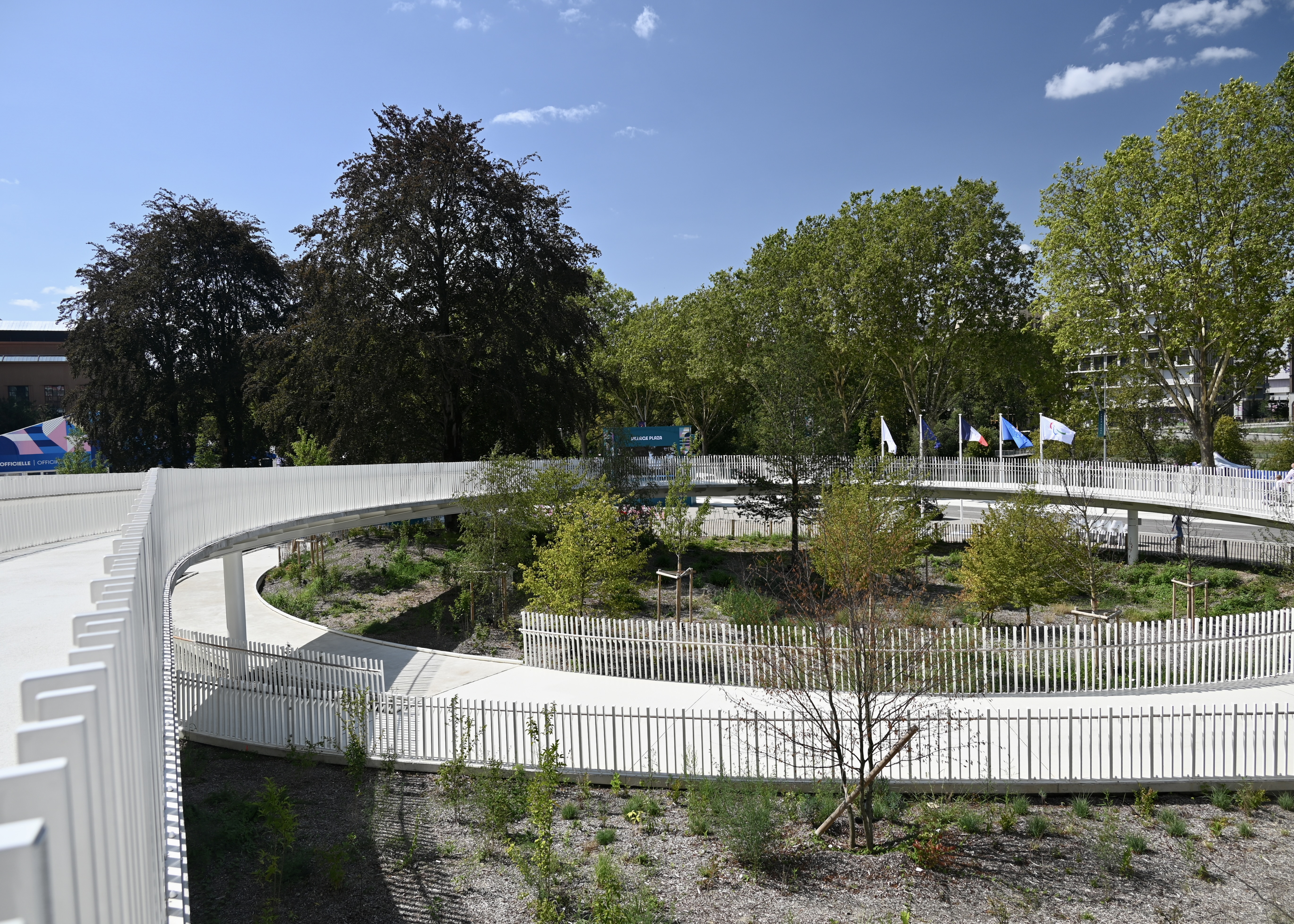
Spiral ramp leading from the village down to the Seine

Heating and cooling were provided by geothermal energy from eleven wells. This system takes water cooled to 4 degrees Celsius from wells up to 70 metres (230 ft) underground and circulates it through pipes under the floors of each apartment. That cold water can cool the building by 6 to 10 degrees Celsius below the temperature outside. Although the system is controlled at the building level, each apartment has a thermostat that allows them to lower or raise the temperature by 2 degrees Celsius. The same system provides heating in the winter.

The geothermal plant also supplied up to two-thirds of the village's electricity. Most of the rest of the electricity was supplied through the grid operated by the Compagnie parisienne de chauffage urbain (CPCU). About 15% of the electricity was supplied by rooftop solar panels. A third of the buildings had solar panels on their rooftops, while another third had rooftop gardens. During the Olympics and Paralympics, the electricity supply was supplemented by a barge moored on the Seine provided by EDF ENR that mounted 470 m^{2} of solar panels with a capacity of 78 kilowatts peak. More than 2.4 kilometres of high-voltage power lines were buried, allowing for 27 pylons (including six in the village area) between Villeneuve-la-Garenne and Saint-Denis to be removed.

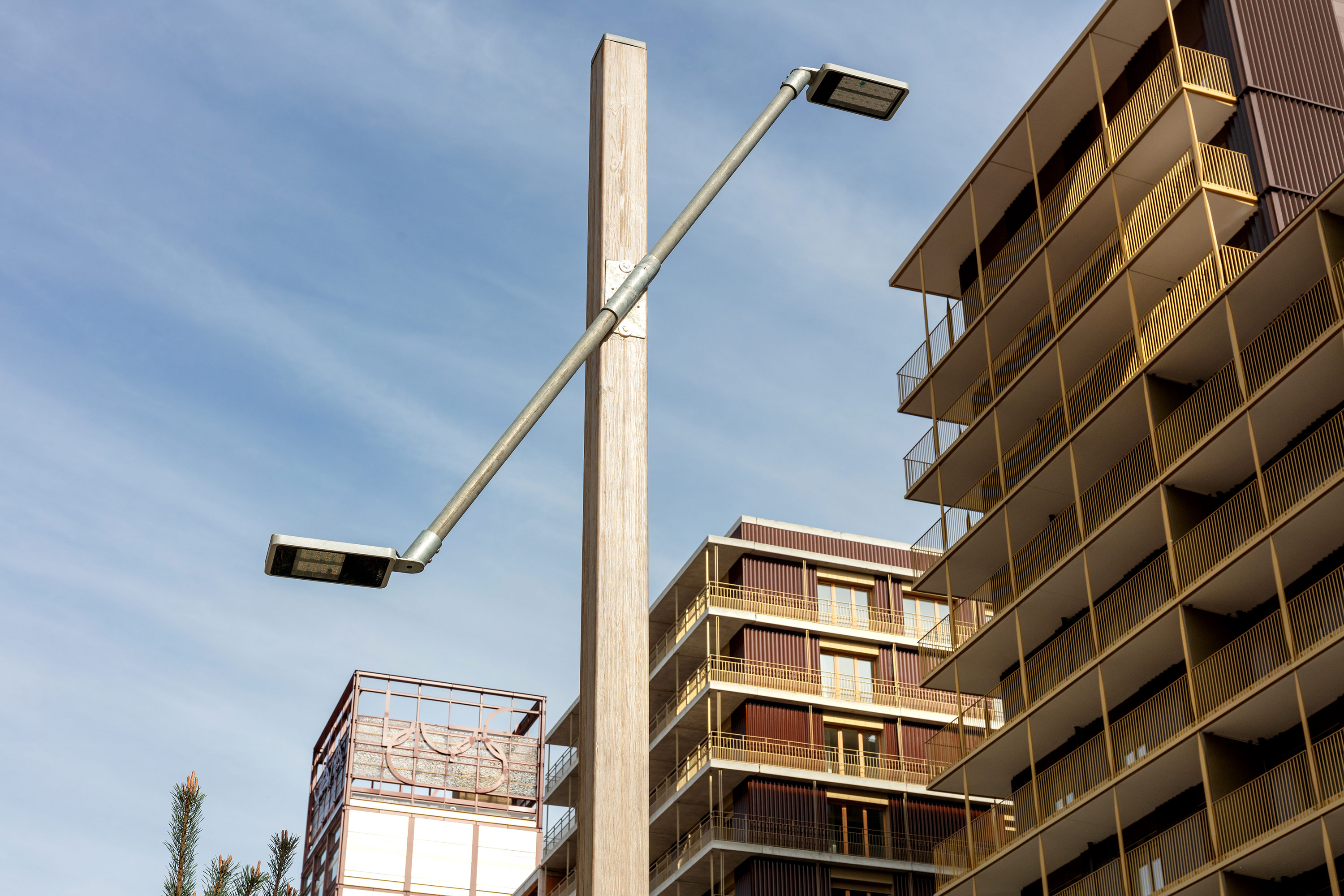
Street lamp with a crossbar of recycled scaffolding

Placo, a subsidiary of Saint-Gobain, deployed 60,000 m^{2} of fully removable partitions in the athletes' rooms, which would be reused after the competition. The 82 buildings contained 3,000 apartments with a total of 7,200 rooms. The apartments were designed for up to eight people, with 12 m^{2} double rooms. Some 345,000 items of furniture were purchased to outfit the rooms, including 16,000 mattresses that were adjustable in firmness and available in four different densities. These were donated to various organisations after the Games. As in Tokyo 2020, the beds had eco-friendly cardboard bases, two metres by 90 centimetres by default, but capable of being extended by up to 30 centimetres more. Furnishings included 14,250 blankets, bedside tables and reading lights, 8,200 fans, 5,535 sofas, 7,600 drying racks, 1,681 shelves and 10,879 chairs.

== Community impact ==
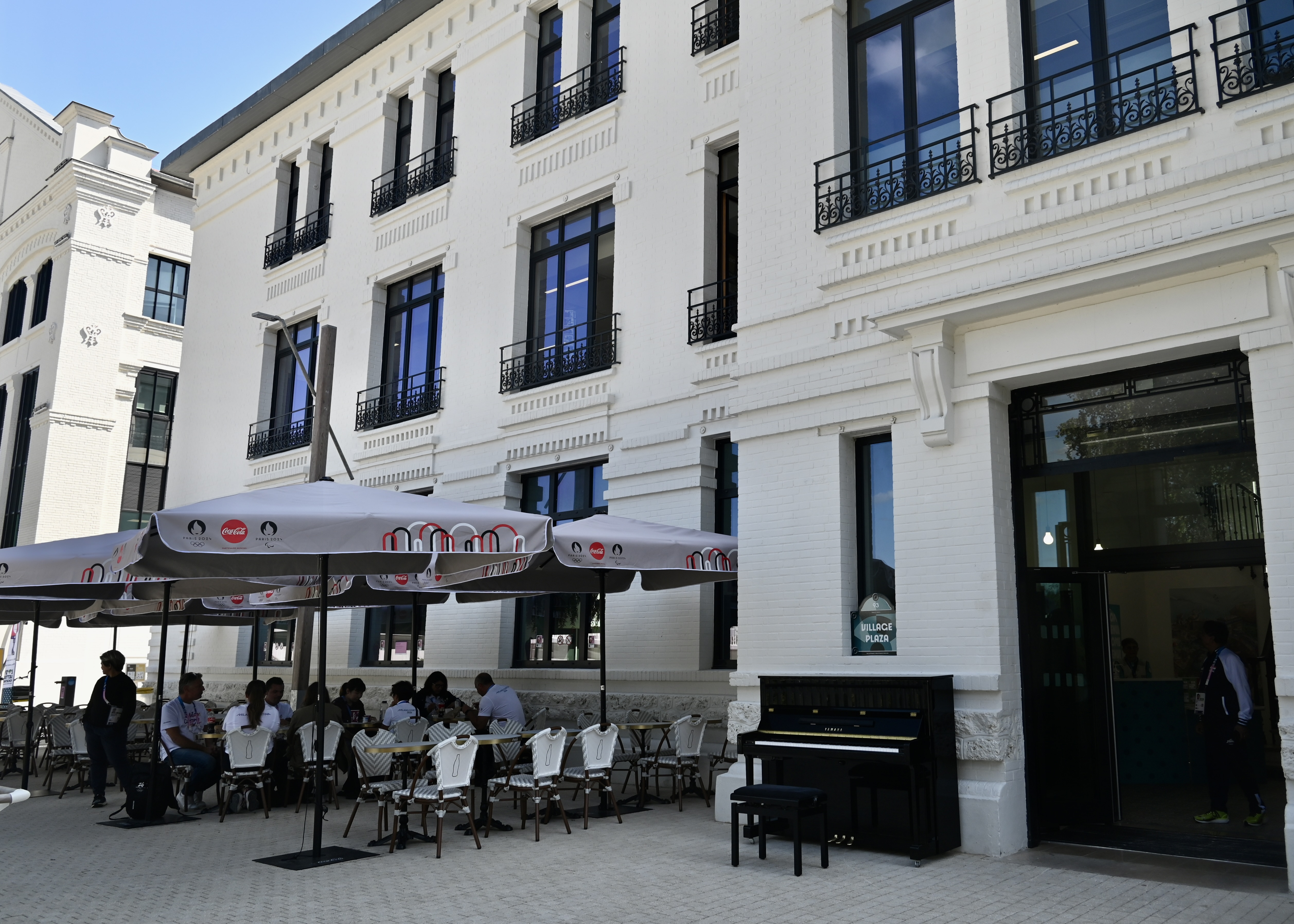
Athletes' village during the Paralympics

The ecological impact of the construction of this Olympic village is controversial. While it is part of a certain continuity of projects for the Pleyel sector in Saint-Denis and the eco-district of L'Île-Saint-Denis, the athletes' village project clashed with existing activities, particularly in Saint-Ouen, which gave rise to opposition and conflicts in 2018 and 2019 due to the destruction of an activity zone, a migrant workers' home, a student residence and a strong impact on several educational establishments.

A six-hectare business park housing 23 companies and 1,300 employees in Saint-Ouen was vacated at the end of 2019. The former migrant workers' home was rebuilt on two nearby sites. The residents were housed in a temporary residence near Porte Montmartre, before returning in early 2023 to a first new home with 150 units near Saint-Ouen station.

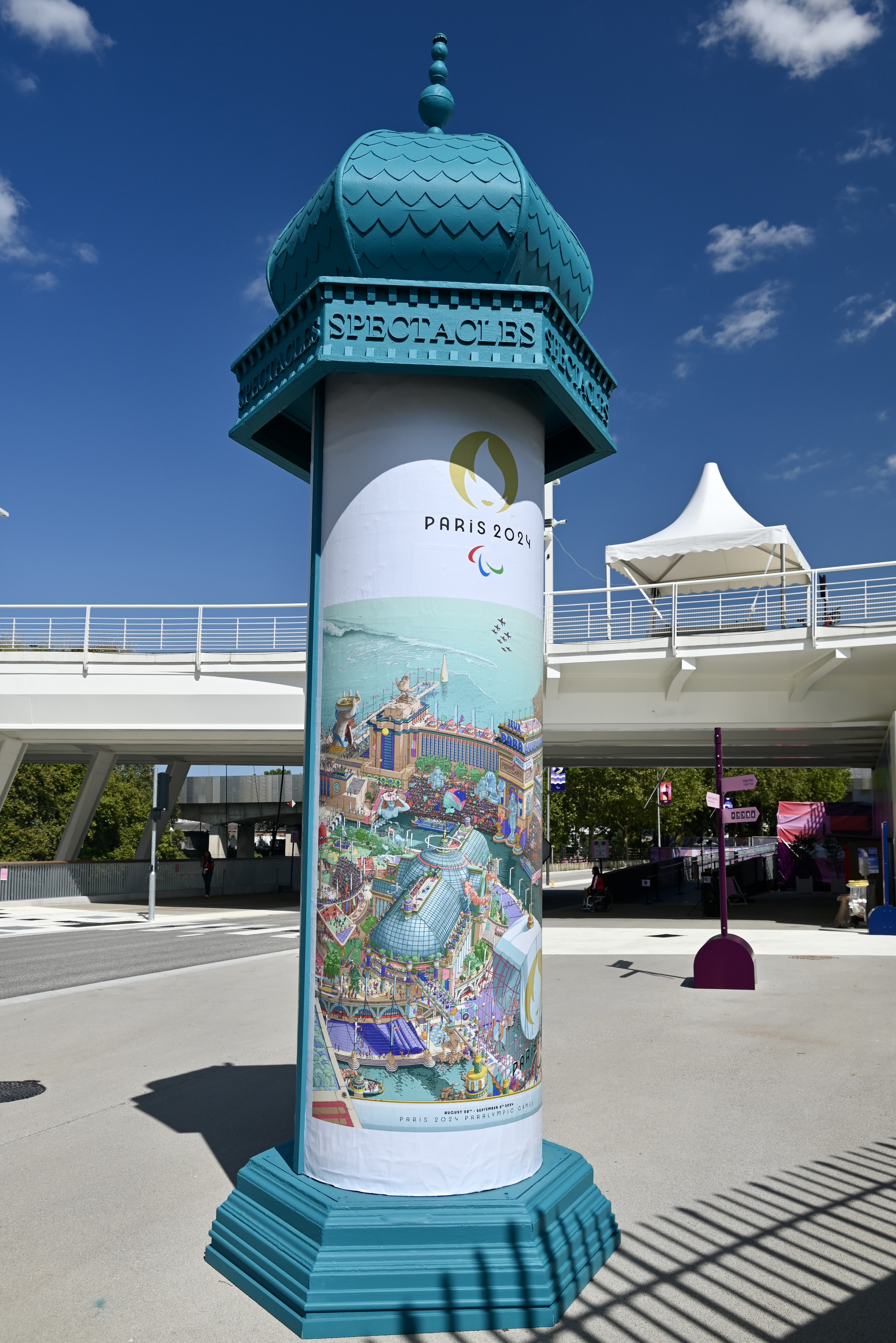
Pillar at the village plaza

Supméca (Institut Supérieur de Mécanique), which trains 650 students annually in Saint-Ouen, and whose campus was partly in the athletes' village, had a new student residence constructed with 150 housing units on a floor area of 3,440 m^{2} at a cost of €8.3 million that would house athletes during the games. A university restaurant was built on the ground floor, and an underground parking lot was constructed as well. The new facilities were connected to the heritage building by an underground tunnel. Integrated into the Cité du Cinéma, the Louis-Lumière school was relocated to Aubervilliers.

The space freed up by the demolition of industrial buildings on the edge of Saint-Ouen and Saint-Denis behind the Dora Maar college allowed for the construction of a temporary bus station to transport athletes and their chaperones to the competition and training venues. Included in the security perimeter of the village, the college's staff housing was rebuilt with bio-sourced materials above the school gymnasium. On the Saint-Ouen side, the Marcel-Cachin high school, which dates from 1965, was rebuilt on the same street at a cost of €64.4 million and reopened on 4 September 2023.

During the Games, the A1 autoroute ramps from Porte de Paris to Saint-Denis were reserved for Olympic use, before being dismantled in 2025. To allow traffic to enter and exit the A86 autoroute, the Pleyel half-interchange was rebuilt with two new traffic directions. However, the project to complete the A86 interchange was denounced by environmental associations and local residents on the grounds of the proximity of the Anatole-France school group and the increase in automobile pollutant emissions that this development would cause. After an initial rejection of their appeal by the administrative courts, the Paris Administrative Court of Appeal denied their appeal on 22 October 2020.

== Handover ==
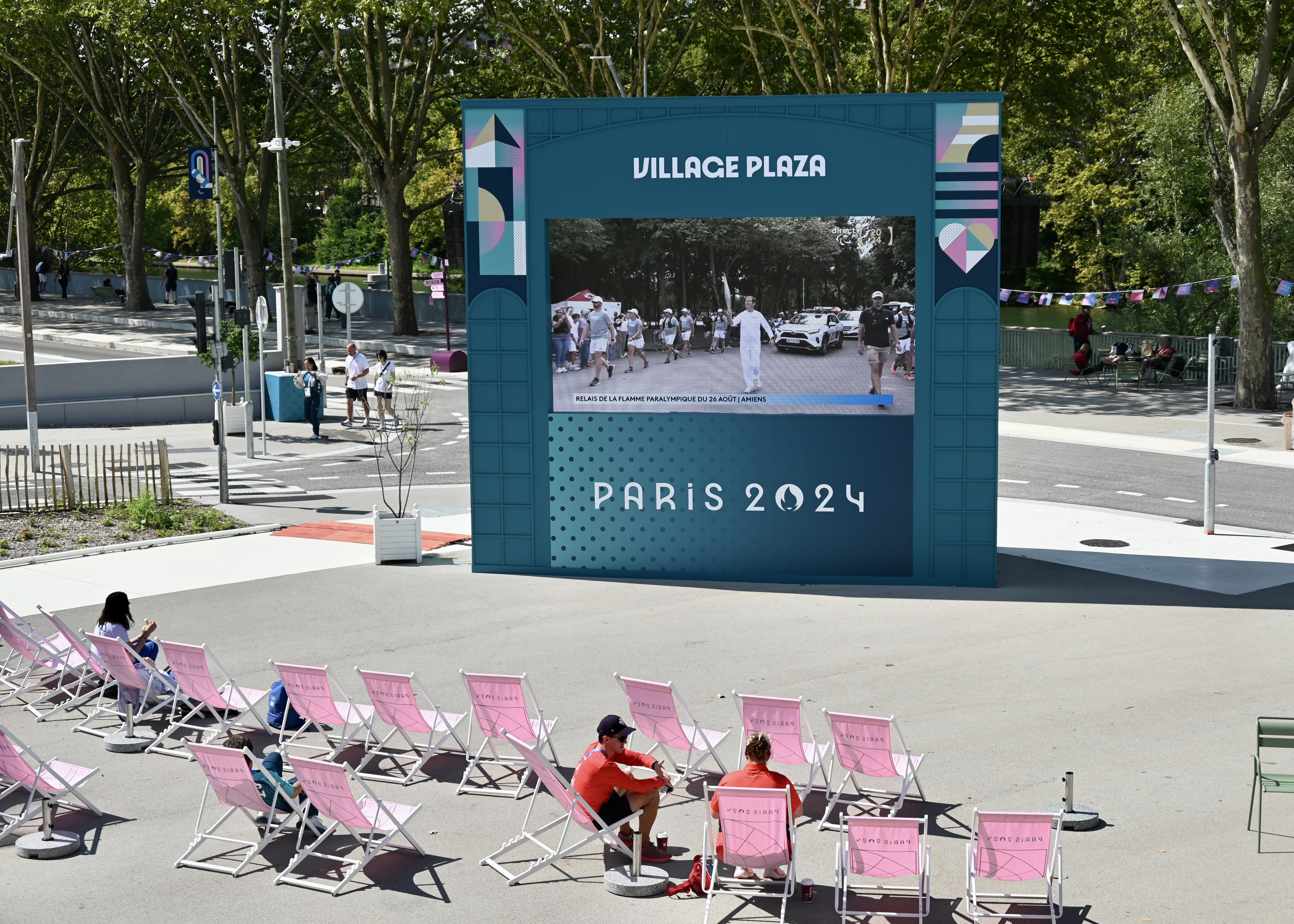
Village Plaza during the Paralympics

On 29 February 2024, a formal ceremony was held in which Nicolas Ferrand, the head of Solideo, handed over the keys to the athletes' village to Paris 2024 president Tony Estanguet in the presence of the President of the French Republic, Emmanuel Macron. Also in attendance were the Mayor of Paris, Anne Hidalgo, the President of the Regional Council of Île-de-France, Valerie Pecresse and the Minister of Sports, Amélie Oudéa-Castéra. Also on hand were several stars of French sport, including Brahim Asloum, who had won a gold medal in boxing gold at Sydney 2000, judoka Aurélien Diesse and three-time Olympic athletics champion, Marie-José Pérec.

Macron described France as a "nation of builders". He told the construction workers: "We are, I am, proud of the work you've done, within budget and on time... Our athletes will be able to experience the Games in the best conditions and you contributed to changing the lives of the inhabitants of the area." The village was delivered on time with less than a 3% cost overrun. The final cost was estimated by Forbes to be about USD $1.85 billion. The athletes' village opened as the Olympic village on 18 July and closed on 13 August. It then re-opened on 21 August as the Paralympic village, and closed again on 10 September, before being handed over to the city on 1 November.

The first residential and office units were expected to be sold in June 2025, with full delivery by September. The transformation involves tasks such as removing excess elevators, converting bathrooms into kitchens and living spaces, removing internal partitions, and minor repairs. Materials removed will be reused on other construction projects.

== See also ==
- List of Olympic Villages
