= Thomas Lavigne =

American politician

The Honorable

Member of the Maine House of Representatives from the 148th district
- Incumbent
- Assumed office December 7, 2022
- Preceded by: David McCrea

Personal details
- Party: Republican
- Children: 2
- Profession: Business owner

Thomas "Tom" Lavigne is an American politician who has served as a member of the Maine House of Representatives since December 7, 2022. He represents Maine's 148th House district.

== Electoral history ==
He was elected on November 8, 2022, in the 2022 Maine House of Representatives election and assumed office on December 7, 2022.

Maine House of Representatives
Preceded by David McCrea	Member of the Maine House of Representatives; 2022–present	Succeeded by incumbent
