= List of Olympic Villages =

An Olympic Village is a residential area built or repurposed for housing Olympic competitors as well as their trainers and other delegation officials at the Olympic Games. Olympic Villages are typically built within or near an Olympic host city, although there have been exceptions. The first Olympic Village was built for the 1924 Summer Olympics in Paris, France, and all Summer Olympic Games since 1932 have had Olympic Villages. The village in Wustermark, built for the 1936 Summer Olympics in Nazi Germany, was the first Olympic Village that was not demolished after the Games ended. The first Winter Olympic Games to have a specifically built Olympic Village were the 1952 Winter Olympics in Oslo, Norway. The village for the 1998 Winter Olympics in Nagano, Japan, was the first to provide free accommodation for athletes.

As the Olympic Games have expanded in scope, so too have the villages. Modern Olympic Villages are capable of housing thousands of people. After the 1972 Munich massacre at the Munich Olympic Village, villages have had increased security. The impact of the global COVID-19 pandemic caused the villages built for the 2020 Summer Olympics and the 2022 Winter Olympics to have increased biosecurity measures to prevent the spread of the disease. In the 21st century, Olympic Village construction has focused on sustainable architecture, with recyclable materials, low-carbon construction, and sustainable energy sources being key aspects of the villages built in the 2020s.

== Summer Olympic Villages ==
Summer Olympic Villages
Games	Location	Description	Refs.
1924	Near the Stade Yves-du-Manoir	The village was a collection of furnished wooden huts intended for three people each. The Village had services such as a post office, a currency exchange office, a left luggage office, a telegraph and telephone service, and a laundry. It also had running water and dining halls, and provided athletes with three meals a day.	
1932	Baldwin Hills, Los Angeles	The village consisted of 500 houses that could each accommodate four people. It had 31 dining halls, a hospital, a dentist, a fire station, a security service, a post office, a telephone network, and an amphitheater. A bus service transported the athletes. Smoky, a stray dog that lived in the village, became the first-ever Olympic mascot. Only male athletes were housed in the village; female athletes were instead housed at the Chapman Park Hotel on Wilshire Boulevard.	
1936	Elstal, Wustermark	The main village consisted of 140 one-story houses with between 8 and 12 bedrooms each, plus military barracks. It was the first permanent Olympic Village to be constructed. The village included 40 dining halls, a sauna, a post office, a bank, a medical center, a restaurant, various shops, and a laundry. Training facilities included a swimming pool, a sports hall, and a 400m track. A communal building housed two rooms for religious services and one room for entertainment.	
1936	Kiel	Accommodations with capacity for 250 people were built for sailing competitors in Kiel.	
1936	Grünau, Berlin	The Köpenick Palace and police school in Grünau, Berlin, in addition to buildings of the Berlin Rowing Association, were used to accommodate participants in the canoeing and rowing competitions.	
1952	Käpylä, Helsinki	The main village consisted of 13 buildings comprising 545 apartments, with a total of 1,630 bedrooms. Facilities included a restaurant, restrooms, a hospital, and a cinema. Various shops and saunas also offered services to athletes. Most female athletes stayed in a nursing school with accommodation for 658 people near the Olympic Stadium.	
1952	Hämeenlinna	Athletes participating in the modern pentathlon events stayed at a local hotel in Hämeenlinna.	
1952	Otaniemi	The delegations from Bulgaria, China, Hungary, Poland, Romania, Czechoslovakia and the Soviet Union were housed in what is now the Helsinki University of Technology in Otaniemi.	
1952	Ruskeasuo	Competitors in the equestrian events were given the opportunity to live in Ruskeasuo to be closer to their horses.	
1952	Santahamina	The Military Officers School in Santahamina provided accommodation for most of the Finnish team.	
1956	Heidelberg West, Melbourne	The Housing Commission of the State of Victoria supported the construction of various buildings to accommodate athletes, with the goal of repurposing the village for sale or rent after the Olympics. 365 buildings were made, including individual houses, two-story buildings, and three-story buildings. The village consisted of 60 hectares, 15 of which were used for sports fields. Services at the village included a sauna, a medical center, a bank, an interpreting service, hairdressers, a post and telephone office, a restaurant, and various shops.	
1956	Lake Wendouree, Ballarat	Competitors in the canoeing and rowing events were housed near Lake Wendouree, where the events were held. The accommodations included a post office, a bank, medical services, a canteen, and a recreation room.	
1956	Karlberg Palace, Stockholm	Due to Australian quarantine laws, the equestrian events at the 1956 Summer Olympics were hosted in Stockholm, Sweden, rather than Australia. Equestrian competitors were housed in the Karlberg Palace, a 17th-century palace that today houses the Military Academy Karlberg.	
1960	Municipio II, Rome	The organizers of the 1960 Summer Olympics renovated a run-down neighborhood called Campo Parioli with the goal of turning it into a residential area after the Games to address a housing shortage in Rome. The accommodations were composed of 33 buildings with a total of 1,348 apartments.	
1960	Naples	Competitors in the football and sailing events were housed in hotels in Naples.	
1964	Washington Heights, Shibuya	The Olympic Village was repurposed from Washington Heights, a housing complex for the United States Armed Forces during the occupation of Japan. Washington Heights was returned to Japan in 1963, at which point it was renovated for the 1964 Summer Olympics. It is now the site of Yoyogi Park.	
1964	Hachiōji	Two accommodations for cycling competitors were created in Hachiōji. One was near the Hachioji Velodrome, and the other was in a youth hostel 4.7km away.	
1964	Lake Sagami	Competitors in canoeing events were housed near Lake Sagami. Female competitors were housed in a youth hostel and male competitors were housed in three other buildings.	
1964	Karuizawa, Nagano	A hotel provided accommodation in Karuizawa, where equestrian events were held.	
1964	Ōiso	A local hotel and a new building in Ōiso housed competitors in the sailing events, which were held about 20km away in Enoshima.	
1968	Tlalpan, Mexico City	The main village consisted of 29 buildings comprising 904 apartments. Three of the buildings were reserved for female competitors and three were reserved for the press. The facilities included two clinics, a press center, a multi-faith chapel, and six restaurants, in addition to training facilities for athletes. Pre-Columbian artefacts from the Cuicuilco archeological site were discovered during construction of the village, and they were displayed in a small museum in the village.	
1968	Acapulco	A hotel in Acapulco housed 503 competitors in sailing events.	
1968	Avándaro Golf Club	The motel of the Avándaro Golf Club was used to accommodate competitors in equestrian events.	
1968	Guadalajara	Competitors in football stayed in hotels in Guadalajara.	
1972	Olympic Village, Munich	The Olympic Village in Munich was built close to the Olympic Stadium and comprised around 1,940 apartments. It had three zones: the men's village, the women's village, and the central zone. Most facilities were located in the central zone, including shops, restaurants, cafés, a bank, a post office, a medical center, a hairdresser, a pharmacy, a laundry, a sewing workshop and a cobbler, among others. The village included a garden with a miniature golf course and a shuttle system transported Olympians around the village. On 5 September 1972, the village was the target of the Munich massacre, a terrorist attack by the Black September Organization in which eleven Israeli athletes and one German police officer were killed. Part of the village is now the Studentenviertel Oberwiesenfeld student residency.	
1972	Near the Bay of Kiel	Competitors in sailing were housed in Kiel. The village in Kiel was composed of two buildings, 32 bungalows and 24 studios, which housed around 700 Olympians.	
1976	Olympic Village, Rosemont–La Petite-Patrie	The Olympic Village in Rosemont–La Petite-Patrie, Montreal, was composed of four semi-pyramidal structures containing a total of 980 apartments. One of the four structures was reserved for female athletes. Services for athletes included a continuously open restaurant with 3,000 seats, televisions to view competitions live, a swimming pool, a multi-faith religious center, a flea market, and shops. In the village's perimeter were conference rooms and interview rooms to allow the press to meet with athletes.	
1976	Near the Olympic Equestrian Centre, Bromont	Competitors in equestrian events were housed in 52 apartments across four buildings in Bromont.	
1976	Queen's University at Kingston	Competitors in sailing events were housed in student residences at the Queen's University at Kingston in Kingston, Ontario.	
1980	Olympic Village, Moscow	The Olympic Village in Moscow was built to align with the city's urban development plan. It was composed of 18 buildings of 16 stories, with a total capacity for around 14,000 people. The bottom and top floors were reserved for offices, and two blocks were reserved for female athletes. The village also included training facilities, a polyclinic, a cultural center, a religious center, an outdoor recreation area, and a restaurant with 4,000 seats. A shuttle service transported Olympians around the village.	
1980	Tallinn, Estonia	Competitors in sailing were housed in Tallinn, the capital of Soviet Estonia. They were housed in eight three-story hotels consisting of 276 rooms.	
1980	Near the Bittsa Equestrian Complex, Moscow	A hotel near Bitsa Park, Moscow, housed 150 competitors in equestrian events.	
1980	Kiev, Leningrad, and Minsk	Competitors in football events were housed in hotels in three cities in the Soviet Union. The three hotels were all newly built just before the Games.	
1984	University of California, Los Angeles and University of Southern California	To save costs, the main housing for athletes at the 1984 Summer Olympics was split between the campuses of UCLA and USC. Scaffolding was used to create decorative towers and arches to delineate the village on both campuses. Athletes had access to a polyclinic, a supermarket, a religious center, salons, a café, a bank, a post office, a call center, a cinema, a swimming pool, and a nightclub. They could also train using existing university sporting facilities. An electric golf cart service was used to transport athletes around the villages.	
1984	University of California, Santa Barbara	The campus of UCSB was used to house 856 canoeing and rowing competitors.	
1984	Quincy House, Harvard University, Branner Hall, Stanford University, and Annapolis, Maryland	Competitors in football stayed in Cambridge, Massachusetts, Palo Alto, California, and Annapolis, Maryland. The housing in Cambridge was located in the Quincy House of Harvard University and the housing in Palo Alto was located in the Branner Hall of Stanford University. Competitors in Annapolis stayed in a hotel.	
1988	Olympic Village, Seoul	The main Olympic Village in Seoul had 3,692 apartments among 86 buildings, with a total capacity for 15,000 people. A restaurant with capacity for 4,200 guests was open 24 hours, and other services included a bank, a post office, a hairdresser, a sporting equipment repair room, a laundry, a souvenir shop, a nightclub, a cinema, a gaming room, a swimming pool, a sauna, a religious center, an interpreting service and a photographic studio. The village became housing at the end of 1988.	
1988	Busan	630 competitors in sailing and football stayed in two hotels in Busan.	
1988	Daegu, Gwangju, and Daejeon	Around 230 football competitors stayed in hotels in Daegu, Gwangju, and Daejeon.	
1992	El Poblenou, Barcelona	A new residential area was built for the 1992 Summer Olympics. It was placed close to the center of Barcelona, but also close to the coast. Several architects worked on the village's design to avoid visual monotony. It included several restaurants, a supermarket, a nightclub, a cinema, a religious center, a karaoke bar, and a bowling alley. Being close to the sea, athletes could also visit the beach. The village was composed of 21 residential centers, each accommodating around 680 athletes.	
1992	La Seu d'Urgell	A school in La Seu d'Urgell was used to house 300 canoeing slalom competitors.	
1992	Banyoles	A new building was constructed near the Lake of Banyoles to house 1,012 rowing competitors.	
1996	Georgia Tech	Student housing and fraternity buildings on the campus of Georgia Tech in Atlanta were used as the Olympic Village in 1996. Athletes could travel around the village using small electric trains and buses.	
1996	Housing at the University of Georgia	One of the student halls at the University of Georgia in Athens housed 160 competitors in gymnastics, volleyball, and football.	
1996	Lee University	Six buildings on the campus of Lee University in Cleveland, Tennessee housed 201 canoeing competitors.	
1996	Columbus, Georgia	170 softball competitors stayed in housing belonging to the United States Army in Columbus, Georgia.	
1996	Savannah, Georgia	682 competitors in sailing events stayed in a hotel in Savannah, Georgia.	
1996	Washington, D.C., Miami, Orlando, and Birmingham	Football players stayed at the campuses of Mount Vernon College, Nova Southeastern University, the University of Central Florida, and Birmingham–Southern College.	
2000	Newington, New South Wales	The village was composed of 350 apartments and 350 modular units in 520 houses, and accommodated around 15,300 people. It was designed with environmentally-friendly construction in mind. Entertainment provided for Olympians included Australian-style bowls, chess tournaments, and street entertainment. There were four information stands throughout the village to answer any questions posed by athletes.	
2000	Melbourne, Canberra, Brisbane, and Adelaide	Competitors in football stayed in hotels in Melbourne, Canberra, Brisbane, and Adelaide.	
2004	Acharnes, East Attica	The Olympic Village was built in Acharnes at the foot of Parnitha with the goal of turning it into housing after the Games ended. Within the village were two centers called Athena and Phevos (named after the mascots of the 2004 Summer Olympics) that provided services such as video game rooms, a swimming pool, a massage room, a rest area, snacks, and laundry rooms. The village had two restaurants and cafés. After the games, infrastructure plans were not implemented, and it remains under-occupied and under-developed.	
2004	Heraklio, Patras, Thessaloniki, and Volos	Competitors in football stayed in hotels in Heraklio, Patras, Thessaloniki, and Volos.	
2008	Beijing Olympic Village, Beijing	The design of the Beijing Olympic Village sought to combine Chinese architecture with environmentally-friendly construction techniques. It made use of LED lighting, permeable bricks to collect rainwater, wastewater filtration, and 6,000 square meters of solar panels for heating. Shuttle buses transported athletes around the village. The decoration of the village's residential zone represented different regions of China.	
2008	Qingdao International Sailing Centre	Around 700 sailing competitors were housed at the newly built Qingdao International Sailing Centre in Qingdao.	
2008	Royal Park Hotel, Hong Kong	The Royal Park Hotel in Hong Kong housed around 450 equestrian competitors.	
2008	Tianjin, Shanghai, Shenyang, and Qinhuangdao	Competitors in football stayed in hotels in Tianjin, Shanghai, Shenyang, and Qinhuangdao.	
2012	East Village, London	The village was developed by the Olympic Delivery Authority, Lendlease, and the Architecture Foundation. It was composed of 11 residential blocks of 63 buildings and 2,818 units. It accommodated around 17,000 people. The village was built on what was originally contaminated wasteland and after the Games it was repurposed into housing. It is now home to Chobham Academy and the Sir Ludwig Guttmann Health and Wellbeing Centre, named after Ludwig Guttmann, the founder of the Paralympic Games. It is part of the Queen Elizabeth Olympic Park.	
2012	Royal Holloway, University of London	1,300 competitors in canoeing and rowing events were housed on the campus of Royal Holloway, University of London.	
2012	Weymouth and Portland National Sailing Academy, Isle of Portland	Competitors in sailing events were housed on the Isle of Portland near the venue at the Weymouth and Portland National Sailing Academy. This was the first 2012 Olympic venue to be completed.	
2012	Cardiff, Coventry, Glasgow, Manchester, and Newcastle upon Tyne	Competitors in football stayed in hotels in Cardiff, Coventry, Glasgow, Manchester, and Newcastle upon Tyne.	
2016	Rio 2016 Olympic Village, Barra da Tijuca	The Rio 2016 Olympic Village in Barra da Tijuca was composed of 31 17-story buildings, 3,604 apartments, and 10,160 bedrooms. Athletes traveled through the village with an internal shuttle service, and athletes had access to a reserved beach. A competition was held for fans under 18 years old to submit photos that "illustrated the spirit of the Olympic Games", and the winning entries were used to decorate the village. Shortly before the beginning of the 2016 Summer Olympics, Thomas Bach inaugurated a place of mourning with two stones from Olympia, Greece, to memorialize those that had died during the Olympics throughout history. The Rio Village was the largest Olympic Village in history when it was created.	
2016	Manaus, São Paulo, Brasília, Belo Horizonte, and Salvador	Competitors in football stayed in hotels in Manaus, São Paulo, Brasília, Belo Horizonte, and Salvador.	
2020	Harumi Flag, Chūō, Tokyo	The 2020 Summer Olympic village was composed of 3,800 apartments in 21 buildings in the district of Harumi, Tokyo. Amenities for athletes included a photo studio, a small supermarket, a post office, a hair salon, a café, and an official souvenir shop. Also available were a polyclinic, COVID-19 test centers, a gym, and a recreation center. Athletes could travel through the village on self-driving electric shuttle buses or on bicycles. The Village Plaza was made of 40,000 pieces of wood donated from 63 municipalities in Japan, and each one had the name of the municipality engraved on it. After the Games ended, the wood was returned to be used in local projects. Due to the COVID-19 pandemic, athletes had to wear masks at all times when in the village. Additionally, bedframes were made from cardboard that was recycled into paper products after the Games ended. The village was repurposed into the Harumi Flag residential complex.	
2020	Ōiso	Competitors in sailing events stayed at the same hotel in Ōiso that had been used in the 1960 Summer Olympics.	
2020	Izu, Shizuoka	Competitors in cycling events were housed in 13 chalets in Izu, Shizuoka.	
2024	Olympic Village, Seine-Saint-Denis	The Olympic Village in Seine-Saint-Denis was designed to accommodate 14,500 athletes in nearly 3,000 apartments spread across 82 residential buildings. The village was designed with the climatic conditions of 2050 in mind. Extensive gardens covered 40 percent of the area, with 9,000 trees and shrubs planted, and there was a six-hectare park. A treatment system recovered waste water for irrigation and cooling. The design of the buildings allowed for air circulation through natural summer ventilation. About 15% of the electricity was supplied by rooftop solar panels. A third of the buildings had solar panels on their rooftops, while another third had rooftop gardens. Two parts of the village were connected by the Louafi Bouguera Olympic Bridge, which was named in honor of the French Algerian athlete Boughera El Ouafi.	
2024	The Aranui 5 cargo liner off the coast of Teahupoʻo, Tahiti	An Olympic Village for surfing competitors was initially planned to be constructed in the village of Teahupoʻo in French Polynesia. Planned infrastructure included two-lane roads, a car bridge, electricity groundwork, coastal embankments, a floating pontoon, and scaffolding. However, local residents and environmental groups opposed the plans, and a compromise was made, with surfers instead being housed on the Aranui 5 cargo liner offshore. This was the first-ever floating Olympic Village. The Aranui 5 housed 28 athletes from 19 delegations.	
2028	University of California, Los Angeles and University of Southern California	Similarly to the 1984 Summer Olympics, the Olympic Villages of 2028 are planned to be on the campuses of UCLA and USC.	
2032	Brisbane Showgrounds, Bowen Hills	The primary 2032 Olympic Village will be on the Brisbane Showgrounds. It will house 10,000 people for the Olympics and 5,000 for the Paralympics.	
2032	Hamilton, Queensland	Another 2032 Olympic Village is planned to be located in Northshore Hamilton, Queensland. It is planned to house around 10,000 people.	

== Winter Olympic Villages ==
Winter Olympic Villages
Games	Location	Description	Refs.
1924	Chamonix, Haute-Savoie	The 258 competitors at the 1924 Winter Olympics were housed in two hotels in Chamonix.	
1928	St. Moritz, Engadin	464 competitors stayed in hotels in St. Moritz.	
1932	Lake Placid, New York	252 competitors stayed in hotels in and near Lake Placid, New York.	
1936	Garmisch-Partenkirchen, Bavaria	646 competitors stayed in hotels in Garmisch-Partenkirchen.	
1948	St. Moritz, Engadin	669 competitors again stayed in hotels in St. Moritz.	
1952	Oslo, Eastern Norway	The 1952 Winter Olympics were the first to have specifically built residencies for Olympians. The villages were in the areas of Sogn, Ullevål and Ila in Oslo. They could hold 600, 400 and 200 people respectively. The largest of the three is now the Sogn Studentby, which now houses around 1,500 students. Additional housing was provided by hotels in Norefjell.	
1956	Cortina d'Ampezzo and Lake Misurina	821 competitors stayed in hotels in Cortina d'Ampezzo and Lake Misurina.	
1960	Olympic Valley, California	The 1960 Winter Olympic Village was composed of four three-story buildings with room for 1,200 people. After the Games, the village became a training center for the United States Olympic & Paralympic Committee. After 1980, the village was converted into condominiums.	
1964	Olympisches Dorf, Innsbruck, Tyrol	The village consisted of four ten-story buildings that accommodated 1,400 people. The construction of the village helped combat Innsbruck's post-war housing shortage, and the village was made available to locals after the Games ended. The village is now known as Olympisches Dorf, or O-Dorf, and it currently houses over 7,000 people.	
1968	Grenoble, Isère	The village was constructed on the site of a closed airfield and consisted of eight 15-story towers and 11 smaller buildings. After the Games ended, 1,000 apartments were made available as social housing, 300 for co-ownership, and 1,800 were reserved for students, young workers, and immigrants.	
1972	Makomanai, Sapporo	A village built near the Makomanai Park accommodated 2,300 people.	
1976	Olympisches Dorf, Innsbruck, Tyrol	The village built in 1964 was reused, and a new facility with room for 2,000 additional people was added.	
1980	Ray Brook, New York	The 1980 village was constructed on the former site of the Ray Brook Sanatorium State Hospital. After the Games, the village was converted into the Federal Correctional Institution, Ray Brook, a medium security prison operated by the Federal Bureau of Prisons. As the facility was constructed with the intent of becoming a prison after the Games, some Olympic athletes reported discomfort with the living arrangements. Italian Olympic Committee member Gianfranco Cameli stated that "The rooms clearly show what they are meant for. Two persons cannot be in them. If two stay inside with the door closed for privacy, they'd feel as if they were in prison—suffocating." Local activists and international participants had protested the dual-purpose building, and some athletes refused to be housed at the facility due to its tiny cells, barred windows, and barbed wire perimeter. A coalition of religious and civil rights activists formed the group Stop the Olympic Prison (STOP) to protest the prison.	
1984	Sarajevo, Socialist Federal Republic of Yugoslavia	Olympic Villages were constructed in Dobrinja, Mojmilo, and Igman. All were heavily damaged during the Siege of Sarajevo in the Bosnian War. The villages in Dobrinja and Mojmilo were rebuilt and are now habitable, while the village in Igman was completely destroyed.	
1988	University of Calgary, Alberta	Athletes were housed in student residencies on the University of Calgary campus. Buildings used for housing athletes included the existing Kananaskis, Rundle, Castle, Norquay and Brewster halls, in addition to the newly created Glacier and Olympus halls. These halls are still used for student accommodation.	
1992	Brides-les-Bains, Savoie	Most competitors and officials stayed in hotels in the commune of Brides-les-Bains. Some also stayed in Val-d'Isère, Les Saisies, La Plagne, La Tania and Tignes.	
1994	Lillehammer Olympic Village, Skårsetlia	The village was composed of wooden cottages in Skårsetlia. Their architecture was inspired by traditional farms of Gudbrandsdalen. The village accommodated 2,650 people.	
1998	Imai, Nagano Prefecture	The 1998 Winter Olympics were the first to provide housing to athletes free of charge. The village housed 3,200 athletes.	
2002	Fort Douglas, Salt Lake City	Athletes in 2002 were housed at Fort Douglas, a historical military fort that had been largely purchased by the University of Utah. 2,399 athletes stayed at the village, and it is today used for student housing.	
2006	Turin, Bardonecchia, and Sestriere	Three Olympic villages were constructed in Turin, Bardonecchia, and Sestriere.	
2010	2010 Olympic Village, Vancouver	The 2010 Olympic Village in Vancouver accommodated around 2,800 people. It is now a mixed-use community with around 1,100 residential units, parks, and retail and service outlets.	
2010	Whistler Olympic and Paralympic Village, Whistler	The Whistler Olympic and Paralympic Village accommodated around 2,800 people.	
2014	Sochi Olympic Park	The Sochi Olympic Park was part of the "coastal cluster" of Olympic venues and housed around 2,000 people.	
2014	Rosa Khutor Alpine Resort	The Rosa Khutor Alpine Resort was part of the "mountain cluster" of Olympic venues and housed around 3,000 people.	
2014	Sloboda Endurance Village	The Sloboda Endurance Village was part of the "mountain cluster" of Olympic venues and housed around 1,000 people.	
2018	Pyeongchang Olympic Village, Pyeongchang	The Pyeongchang Olympic Village was composed of eight 15-story buildings and was host to a dining facility, a laundry facility, a general store, a bank, a post office, and recreation center.	
2018	Gangneung Olympic Village, Gangneung	The Gangneung Olympic Village was composed of nine buildings comprising 922 housing units. It could accommodate 2,717 people.	
2022	Beijing Winter Olympic Village, Beijing	The Beijing Winter Olympic Village was constructed in 2022 just south of the Olympic Green. It contained 2,300 beds and, like the Beijing Olympic Village from 2008, became residential housing after the Games completed. The village was powered by solar energy. The village was staffed by robotic bartenders and waiters.	
2022	Yanqing Olympic Village, Yanqing District	The Yangqing Olympic Village was designed to resemble a traditional Chinese mountain village and accommodated 1,430 people. It was used to house participants in alpine skiing, luge, bobsleigh and skeleton. The village was staffed by robotic bartenders and waiters.	
2022	Zhangjiakou Olympic Village, Zhangjiakou	The Zhangjiakou Olympic Village housed 2,640 people and became a business park after the Games ended. It was used to house participants in skiing, snowboarding, biathlon, ski jumping and cross-country skiing. The village was staffed by robotic bartenders and waiters.	
2026	Milan Olympic Village, Milan	The Milan Olympic Village was constructed as part of the Scalo Romana urban redevelopment project. The village was designed by the American architecture firm SOM and hosted 1,500 residents during the Games. The village was converted into student housing by the real estate company COIMA.	
2026	Cortina Airport, Cortina d'Ampezzo	The Cortina Olympic Village consisted of 377 temporary mobile homes that accommodated up to 1,400 residents. The village also had a gym, a game room, offices, relaxation areas, and a laundromat. The village was removed after the Games ended. The village was built on the site of the former Cortina Airport, which closed in 1976.	

== See also ==
- Cost of the Olympic Games
- List of Olympic Games host cities
- List of Olympic venues
