= Harumi Flag =

Housing development in Tokyo

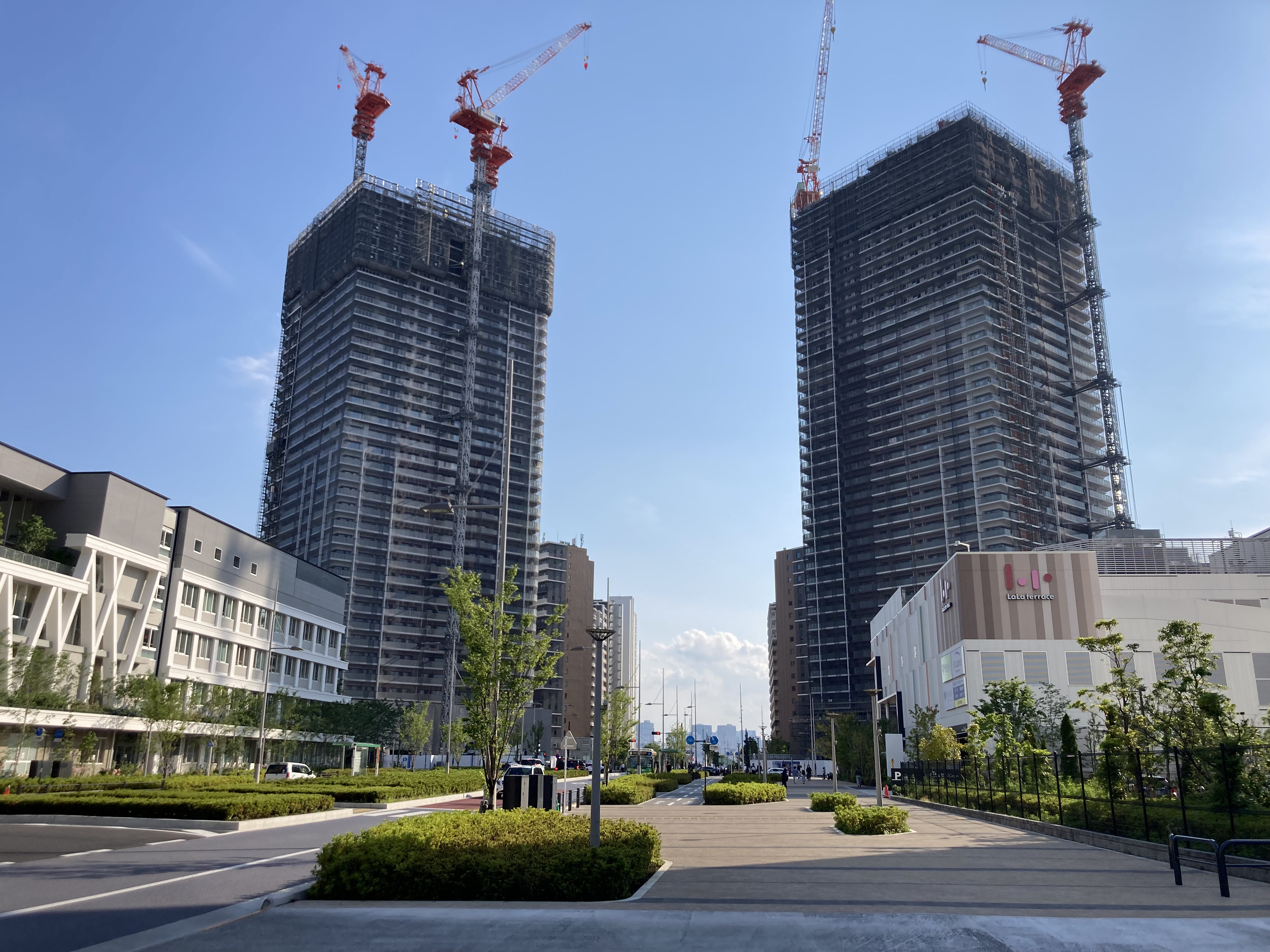
The exterior view of HARUMI FLAG, the apartment complex built on the site of the former Olympic and Paralympic Village from the 2020 Tokyo Games.

Harumi Flag (Japanese: 晴海フラッグ) is the name given to the large-scale urban development project on the former site of the Olympic Village for the 2020 Summer Olympics in Harumi, Chuo Ward, Tokyo. On approximately 18 hectares (44 acres) of land, construction is underway for 24 buildings, including 5,632 condominiums and rental units alongside commercial facilities.

The Olympic and Paralympic Games were held in 2021, a year later than expected due to the COVID-19 pandemic, and occupancy of the condominiums built on the site began on January 19, 2024. In April 2024, new elementary and junior high schools established by Chuo Ward opened, and it is expected that approximately 12,000 people will be living in the area by 2025.

== Overview ==
The Harumi Flag location is the former Tokyo International Trade Fair grounds. When the Cabinet approved the bid for the 2016 Tokyo Olympics, the Olympic main stadium was planned to be built on this site. However, Japan was unsuccessful in this bid, and the 2016 Olympics were held in Rio de Janeiro, Brazil.

Japan's bid was reworked to host the 2020 Olympics, and the plan for the site was changed to the development of the Olympic village.

In September 2013, the 2020 Olympic and Paralympic Games were decided to be held in Tokyo.

Responding to this decision, the Tokyo Metropolitan Government initiated the Harumi 5-chome West District Urban Redevelopment Project in March 2015 to build the Olympic Village, which would serve as a legacy after the event. The Bureau of Urban Development of the Tokyo Metropolitan Government supervised the development of roads and other infrastructure, while the residential and commercial facilities were constructed with private funds under the special developer system, which allows private funding to build on behalf of the government. The construction began in 2017 and was completed in December 2019.

Interior renovation was to be done after the Games, and occupancy was scheduled to begin in March 2023. However, due to the global outbreak of COVID-19, the Games were postponed to between July and September 2021. Consequently, the schedule for occupancy was also postponed by one year.

When all buildings are completed, the total number of units will be 5,632 (including 4,145 units for sale), which can house approximately 12,000 people. This makes it the largest condominium complex in Japan.

== Lawsuits and criticism ==
=== Lawsuit for underpriced land sale ===
The Tokyo Metropolitan Government plans to sell the land to Mitsui Fudosan and other companies for approximately 87 million US dollars by 2025, when infrastructure development is completed. However, 32 citizens of Tokyo have filed a resident lawsuit against Governor Yuriko Koike, claiming the sale contract was illegal due to the land being sold at an unfairly low price and demanding compensation for the difference between the sale price and the fair market value. On December 23, 2021, The Tokyo District Court dismissed the lawsuit, ruling that the sale price could not be deemed inappropriate.

The residents plan to appeal the court's decision.

=== Criticism over the purchase of units for investment purposes ===
Despite the restrictions on purchasing units for investment purposes, an investigation by Japan Broadcasting Corporation (NHK) in May 2024 revealed that nearly 20% of the 2,690 units (491 units) were being used for investment activities such as renting and resales.

Tokyo Governor Yuriko Koike responded to this issue during a press conference in May 2024, “I think there will be various uses, so I’d like to watch its future development.” However, Professor Chie Nozawa from Meiji University criticized this response, stating, “With so many investments pouring in, the housing may not reach the people who genuinely need it. The Tokyo government, which oversees the project, should have controlled the situation to ensure a certain percentage of residents indeed have their residency registered there.”

== See also ==
- List of Olympic Villages
