= Aranui 5 =

Passenger ship in French Polynesia

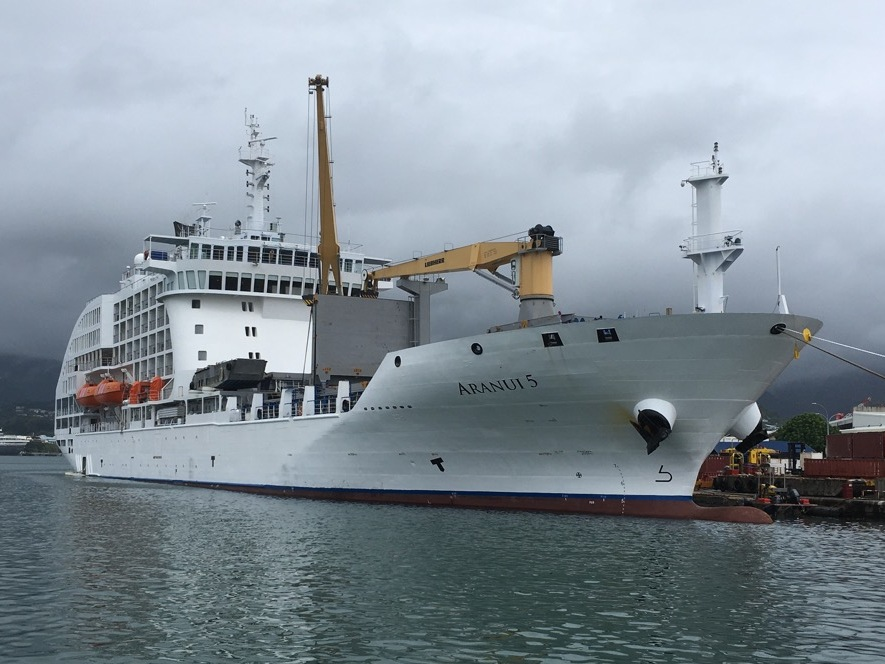
- Aranui 5

History

France
- Name: Aranui 5
- Owner: Compagnie Polynesienne de Transport Maritime (CPTM)
- Port of registry: Papeete, French Polynesia (France)
- Builder: Huanghai Shipbuilding, Shandong, China
- Yard number: K-19
- Launched: 8 Februari 2015
- In service: 12 December 2015
- Home port: Papeete, French Polynesia
- Identification: IMO number: 9677492; Call sign: FIQC; MMSI number: 546018800
- Status: In service

General characteristics
- Type: Passenger-cargo ship
- Tonnage: 7,500 GT; 3,300 DWT
- Length: 126 m (413 ft 5 in)
- Beam: 24 m (78 ft 9 in)
- Draught: 5.5 m (18 ft 1 in)
- Decks: 10
- Speed: 15 knots (28 km/h; 17 mph)
- Capacity: 256
- Crew: 64

MV Aranui 5 is a cargo liner that entered service on 12 December 2015 between Tahiti and the Marquesas Islands. With a homeport of Papeete, French Polynesia, the Aranui 5 replaced the Aranui 3, which entered service in 2003.

No ship named Aranui 4 ever went into service, because the number four is regarded as unlucky in China; Wing Wong, the founder of the business that operates the Aranui voyages, was from China. Aranui 5, like its predecessor, is registered as a passenger ship under the International Convention for the Safety of Life at Sea (SOLAS), for international operation.

As well as carrying cargo to and from the six ports in the Marquesas Islands, Aranui 5 operates a passenger service and tourist cruise as part of its monthly 12-day itinerary; the ship also stops at the Rangiroa and Tuamotu atolls before returning to Tahiti. Additional Aranui 5 trips operate to other islands in French Polynesia and beyond, including Rarotonga and the Cook Islands and once a year to Pitcairn Island.

The Aranui 5 was used to house surfers at the 2024 Summer Olympics off the coast of Teahupoʻo, Tahiti, making it the first floating Olympic village. The ship housed 28 athletes from 19 delegations.

== See also ==
- List of Olympic Villages
