= Pyeongchang Olympic Village =

Apartment complex in Pyeongchang, South Korea

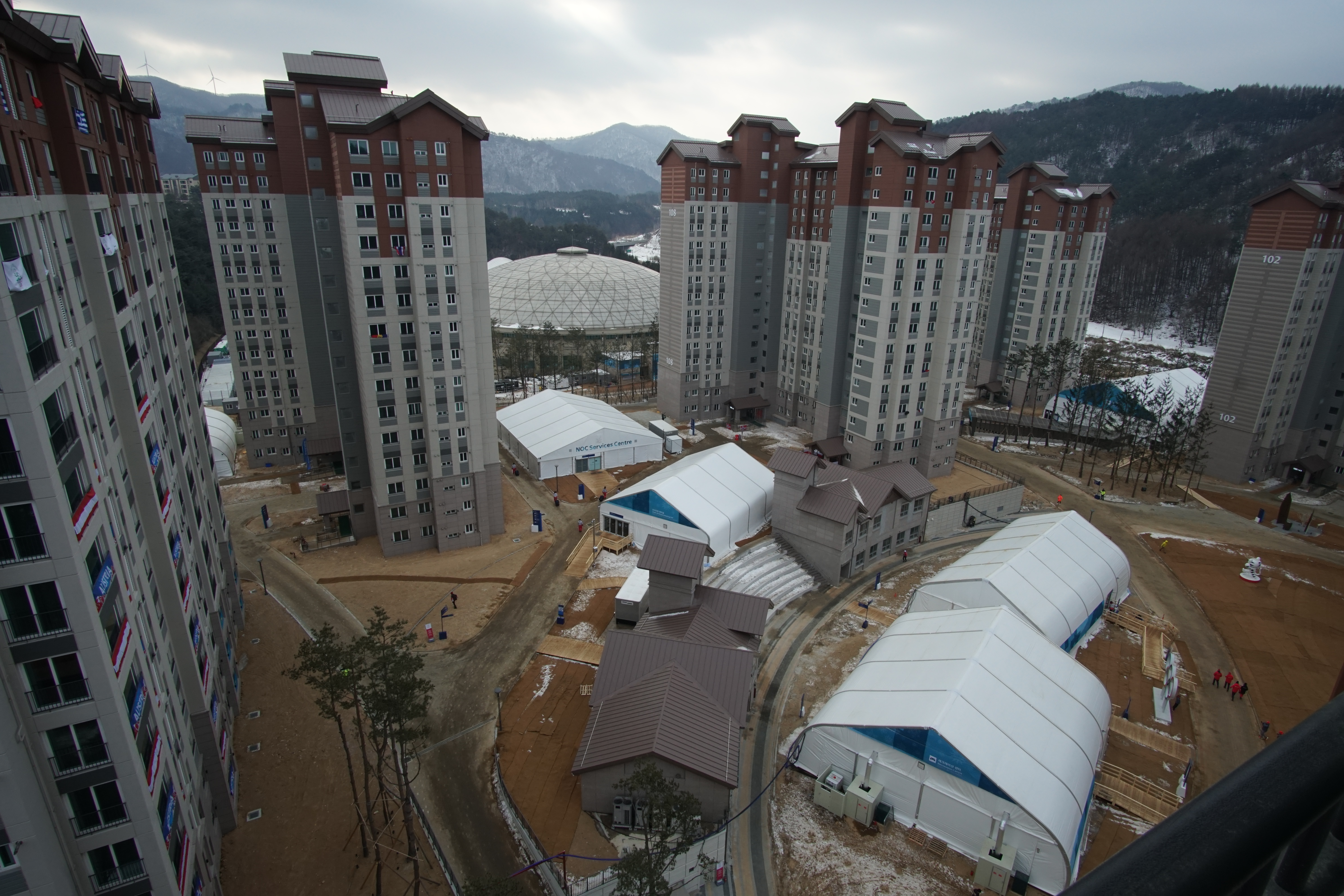
Buildings of the Pyeongchang Olympic Village.

The Pyeongchang Olympic Village is a complex of high-rise apartments in Pyeongchang County, South Korea. As an Olympic Village, it hosted the attendees (which included competitors and their coaches) during the 2018 Winter Olympics. For the games, it was composed of eight 15-story buildings and was host to a dining facility, a laundry facility, a general store, a bank, a post office, and recreation center.

== See also ==
- List of Olympic Villages
- Olympic Village (Seoul)
