= Beijing Olympic Village =

Olympic village of the 2008 Summer Olympics

Coordinates: 40°00′27.71″N 116°22′47.60″E

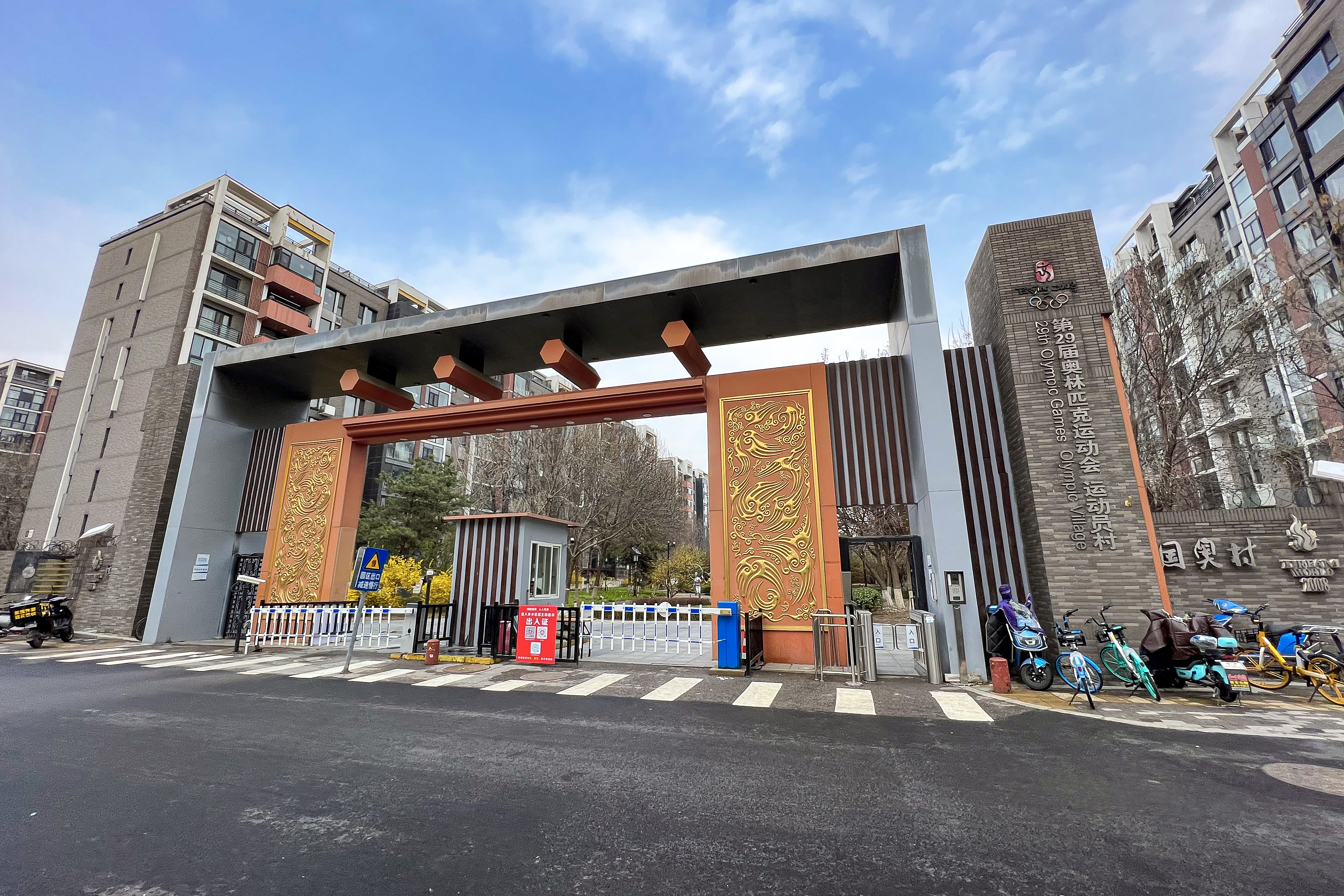
West gate of the west wing

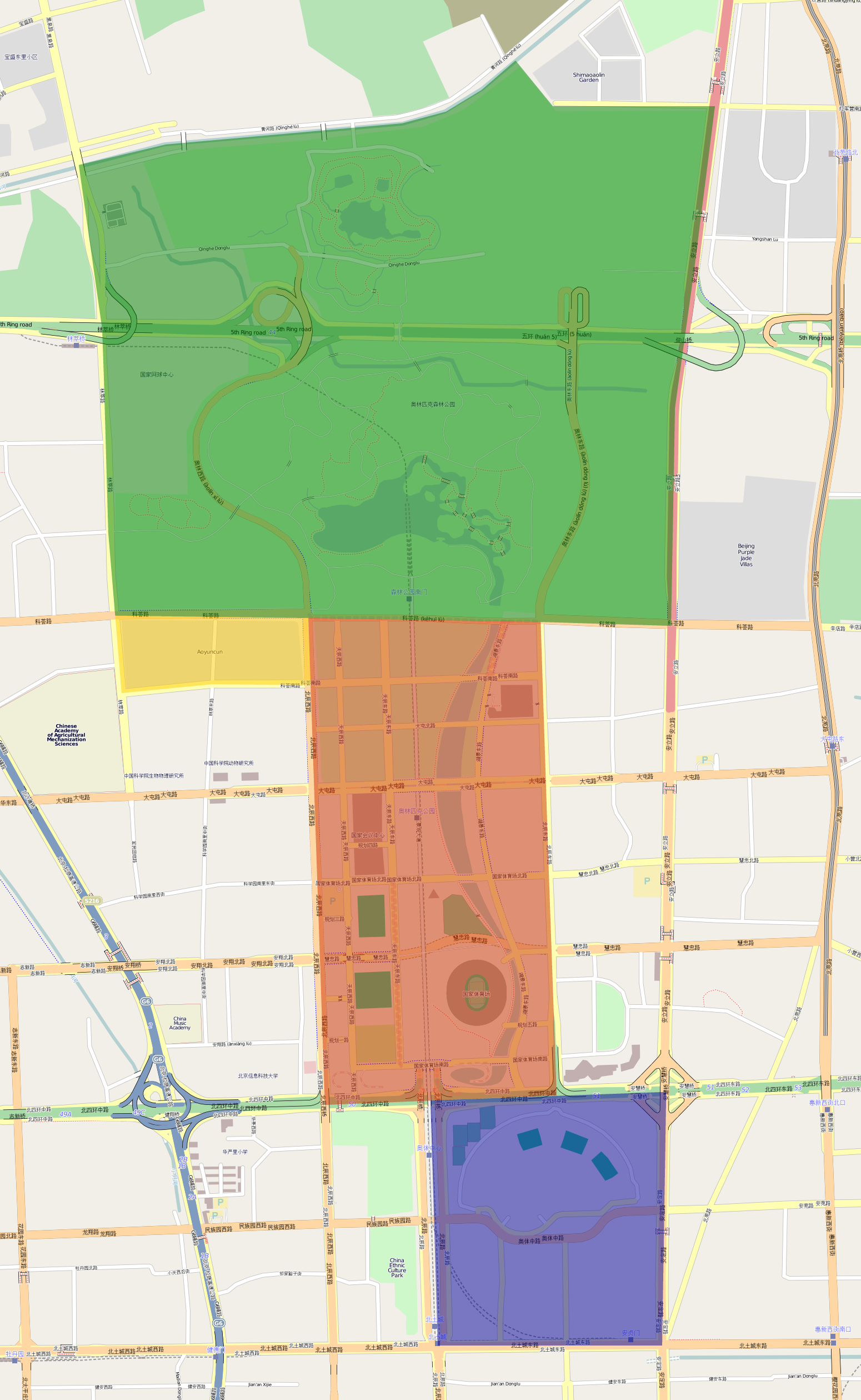
Colored map of the Olympic Green. The Olympic Village is highlighted in yellow.

The Beijing 2008 Summer Olympics Village (simplified Chinese: 北京奥运村; traditional Chinese: 北京奧運村; pinyin: Běijīng 2008 Àoyùn Cūn) is a complex of high-rise apartments in Beijing, China, which were opened to the public on July 27, 2008, and closed on August 27, 2008, in conjunction with the 2008 Summer Olympics. As an Olympic Village, it hosted the competitors and their coaches during the event.

The village is located on 660,000 square meters (7,100,000 sq ft) of land which connects with the Olympic Forest and Stadium. It is also connected to two media villages which can host up to 7,000 media personnel. The village was designed to accommodate over 16,000 athletes while providing ample space for both the athletes' social and athletic needs. Of the $42 billion Beijing spent on hosting the 2008 Summer Olympics, $1.827 billion went to the Olympic Village.

Safety was of extreme importance to athletes as well as their home countries. During the Olympics, extreme humidity and pollution were a problem, with the Czech team taking their own air measurements to ensure the health and safety of their athletes.

After the Olympics, apartments on the Olympic Green have been transformed into a residential area. Due to this, for the 2022 Winter Olympics, there was a need to build another Olympic Village on a smaller scale. These new buildings are located in the southern area of Olympic Green at area of the former hockey and archery fields on the neighbour area of the National Olympic Sports Center.

== See also ==
- Olympic Green
- List of Olympic Villages
