= Gangneung Olympic Village =

Apartment complex in Gangneung, South Korea

Coordinates: 37°45′11″N 128°51′59″E

The Gangneung Olympic Village is a complex of high-rise apartments in Gangneung, South Korea. As an Olympic Village, it hosted the attendees, which included competitors and their coaches, during the 2018 Winter Olympics. For the games, it was composed of nine buildings comprising 922 housing units. It could accommodate 2,717 people.

== See also ==
- List of Olympic Villages
- Olympic Village (Seoul)
