= Whistler Olympic and Paralympic Village =

Olympic Village in British Columbia

Coordinates: 50.080205°N 123.042637°W

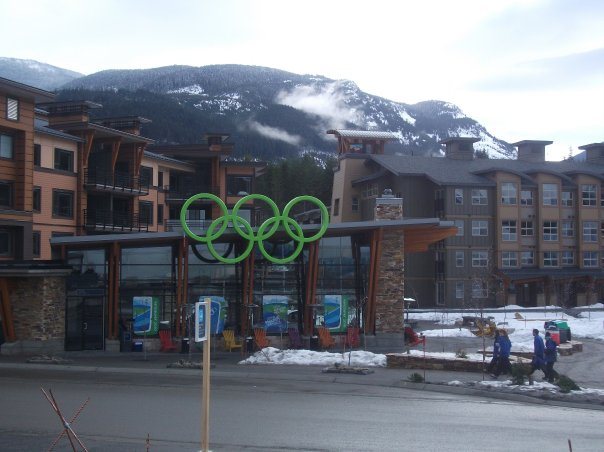
The Whistler Olympic and Paralympic Village

The Whistler Olympic and Paralympic Village was a 2010 Winter Olympics facility in the resort town of Whistler, British Columbia. The Olympic Village is considered one of Whistler's legacy projects, in that it is being used after the Olympics to help house and train Canadian athletes. Whistler is one of the two host communities for the Games. The site of this athletes' village is in the Cheakamus Valley approximately 20 minutes south of the Whistler Mountain competition venues, and 6 km from the highway cutoff for the Whistler Olympic Park sliding events venue in the Callaghan Valley.

The village held 2,400 athletes and officials. The athletes and officials housed in this village participated in the events held at the Whistler Olympic Park, Whistler Creekside and the Whistler Sliding Centre. The cost of the village was estimated at 32 million dollars. It consists of a 100-room lodge and a 20-unit townhouse complex.

== See also ==
- List of Olympic Villages
- 2010 Olympic Village (Vancouver)
