= Cortina Airport =

Cortina Airport Aeroporto di Cortina
- IATA: CDF; ICAO: LIDI

Summary
- Location: Cortina d'Ampezzo, Veneto, Italy
- Elevation AMSL: 4,262 ft / 1,299 m
- Coordinates: 46°34′34″N 12°07′00″E
- Interactive map of Cortina Airport

Runways
Direction	Length		Surface
Direction	ft	m	Surface
18/36	4,528	1,380

Cortina Airport, also known as the Cortina d'Ampezzo Airport and Fiames Airport, is an abandoned airport located in Cortina d'Ampezzo, Veneto, Italy.

The airport was built for the 1956 Winter Olympics. On 11 March 1967, an airplane crashed into a mountain ridge due to poor visibility caused by the weather. On 31 May 1976, an airplane stalled, crashed, and caught fire on the runway. Following this, the airport was permanently closed by a decision from Cortina City Hall.

== 2026 Winter Olympics village ==
In 2026, the site was used as an Olympic Village for the 2026 Winter Olympics and 2026 Winter Paralympics. It accommodated 1,400 athletes, coaches and supporting staff. The site had 377 temporary cabins, each able to accommodate two people, as well as ancillary buildings (restaurant, lounge, gym and laundry) had been built on the site for €38 million. Following the Games, the site was dismantled and the cabins sold.
