= Cost of the Olympic Games =

Budget of Olympic Games

The Olympic Games are considered to be the world's foremost international sporting event with over 200 nations participating. It historically had the highest costs and expenses for the hosts, with the estimated cost of the 2016 Summer Games in Rio de Janeiro being at approximately US$11.1 billion.

Sports-related costs since 1960 have been on average US$5.2 billion for the Summer Games and US$393.1 million for the Winter Games. The highest recorded total cost was that of the 2014 Sochi Winter Olympics, costing approximately US$55 billion. The 2016 Rio de Janeiro Summer Games experienced the biggest loss recorded at approximately US$2 billion.

Host City Contract principles set by the International Olympic Committee require host cities, National Olympic Committees, and Organizing Committees to assume full financial responsibility for staging the Olympic Games. The contract also requires legally binding financial guarantees from host governments, making public authorities ultimately responsible for covering any financial shortfalls incurred by the Games.

== Costs ==
The current highest cost of hosting the Olympic Games was the 2016 Rio de Janeiro Summer Games, costing approximately US$11.1 billion. In order to meet the requirements set out by the International Olympic Committee (IOC), the Rio de Janeiro council had to invest heavily in building the necessary facilities/venues, and an entirely new subway line. The lack of a solid infrastructure to support these investments led to the council underestimating their costs by 25%.

The costs of hosting the Olympic Games can be classified into 2 categories: infrastructure and operational costs.

=== General infrastructure ===
The costs of general infrastructure consist of preparing the necessary infrastructure to accommodate the influx of tourists and athletes in the host city. The International Olympic Committee requires a minimum of 40,000 hotel rooms available for visiting spectators and an Olympic Village that is able to house 15,000 athletes, referees, and officials.

Internal and external transportation facilities that can transport spectators into and out of the host city and from venue to venue are also required by the Committee. These requirements are often met through renovations to already-built facilities or construction of entirely new facilities. These facilities include train/subway lines, roads, and airports.

=== Sports infrastructure ===
The host city is also required by the Olympic Committee to invest in sport-specific infrastructure that meets their requirements. Facilities must have specified minimum sizes and reach the specific seating and safety protocols which often require refurbishments or new construction, particularly less-used facilities such as natatoriums, velodromes and sliding tracks.

=== Host city selection ===
The Winter Games require high mountains, especially for the alpine events. Traditionally, there were requirements of fairly short distance between the host city and the alpine slopes, which often has made smaller cities to be chosen as winter host cities, such as Lake Placid, Lillehammer and Sochi. After 2012 when no democratic country bid for the Winter Games due to the high cost, a larger distance was accepted, allowing existing slopes to be used together with a large host city with more existing infrastructure, for example Milan at a distance of 410 km by road to Cortina.

=== Operating costs ===
Once the necessary infrastructure is put in place, the Olympics require a large amount of spending on operating costs throughout the duration of the Games. Historically, the most significant operating costs for the hosts have been in event management, organization and preparation of the opening and closing ceremonies, and increasingly in recent years, security.

== Surplus distribution ==
In the event that an Olympic Games organizing committee generates a financial surplus, the distribution of that surplus is typically governed by agreements between the International Olympic Committee (IOC), the local Organising Committee for the Olympic Games (OCOG), and the relevant National Olympic Committee (NOC). Following the Paris 2024 games, the Organising Committee reported a budget surplus after Games operations, and its agreement allocated portions of the surplus to the IOC, the French National Olympic and Sports Committee (CNOSF), and towards sports development programs in France rather than retaining the surplus for the host government or city.

== Table ==
The table below lists the costs of hosting the Olympic Games. Due to the multitude of reporting methods, the table contains both the operating costs and total final costs (which include various infrastructure upgrades and security costs), as well as both known and not estimated figures. Net loss or gain are measured against the operating budgets. Intangible costs (such as to the environment and society) and benefits (through tourism) are not included here.

Olympiad	Host	Final Operating Budget	Total Costs	Taxpayer Contribution	Profit/Loss	Notes
1896 Summer Olympics	(Greece) Athens		3,740,000 ₯			Donations by George Averoff of 1,000,000 ₯ covered potential losses
1900 Summer Olympics	(France) Paris					
1904 Summer Olympics	(United States) St. Louis					
1908 Summer Olympics	(United Kingdom) London		US$394,000 est.		▲£6,377	First & smallest known profit for an Olympic Games
1912 Summer Olympics	(Sweden) Stockholm					
1920 Summer Olympics	(Belgium) Antwerp					
1924 Winter Olympics	(France) Chamonix		₣3.5 million	₣2 million		
1924 Summer Olympics	(France) Paris				▼5,496,610₣	First known loss for an Olympic Games
1928 Winter Olympics	(Switzerland) St. Moritz		CHF706,000		▼CHF104,800	First & smallest known loss for a Winter Olympics
1928 Summer Olympics	(Netherlands) Amsterdam		$1.183 million		▼$18,000	Smallest known loss for an Olympic Games
1932 Winter Olympics	(United States) Lake Placid					
1932 Summer Olympics	(United States) Los Angeles				▲$1 million	
1936 Winter Olympics	(Germany) Garmisch-Partenkirchen					
1936 Summer Olympics	(Germany) Berlin		$30 million			
1948 Winter Olympics	(Switzerland) St. Moritz					
1948 Summer Olympics	(United Kingdom) London	£761,688			▲£29,000	
1952 Winter Olympics	(Norway) Oslo					
1952 Summer Olympics	(Finland) Helsinki		Mk1.58 billion		▼ Mk49 million	
1956 Winter Olympics	(Italy) Cortina d'Ampezzo			lira 460 million		
1956 Summer Olympics	(Australia) Melbourne	A£5.4 million			▼A£300,000	
1960 Winter Olympics	(United States) Squaw Valley	US$80 million				
1960 Summer Olympics	(Italy) Rome					
1964 Winter Olympics	(Austria) Innsbruck					
1964 Summer Olympics	(Japan) Tokyo	US$72 million	US$1.926 billion			
1968 Winter Olympics	(France) Grenoble					
1968 Summer Olympics	Mexico City	US$176 million				
1972 Winter Olympics	(Japan) Sapporo					
1972 Summer Olympics	(West Germany) Munich	DM1.972 billion				
1976 Winter Olympics	(Austria) Innsbruck					
1976 Summer Olympics	(Canada) Montreal	CDN$207 million	CDN$$1.596 billion		▼CDN$990,000	A special tobacco tax was introduced in May 1976 to fund the loss. Debt paid off in 2006.
1980 Winter Olympics	(United States) Lake Placid	US$49 million	US$169 million			
1980 Summer Olympics	(Soviet Union) Moscow	US$231 million	US$1.35 billion US$2 billion		▼US$1.19 million deficit	The United States and 64 other nations boycotted due to the Soviet invasion of Afghanistan
1984 Winter Olympics	(Socialist Federal Republic of Yugoslavia) Sarajevo	US$55.4 million	US$110.9 million		▲US$1 million	The first Olympics since 1948 to make a profit, and the first known Winter Olympics to make a profit
1984 Summer Olympics	(United States) Los Angeles	US$320 million	US$413 million	$75 million	▲US$250 million.	The first Summer Olympics since 1948 to make a profit
1988 Winter Olympics	(Canada) Calgary	CDN$438 million	CDN$899 million	CDN$425 million	▲CDN$32 million	
1988 Summer Olympics	(South Korea) Seoul	US$4 billion			▲US$479 million	Record profit for a government-run Olympiad
1992 Summer Olympics	(Spain) Barcelona	US$850 million	US$9.3 billion		▲US$10 million	Operating costs were put at 9.1% of the total cost. The vast majority of spending was to improve infrastructure.
1992 Winter Olympics	(France) Albertville			US$1.2 billion (infrastructure)	▼US$67 million	
1994 Winter Olympics	(Norway) Lillehammer	US$1.1 billion		US$250 million		
1996 Summer Olympics	(United States) Atlanta	US$1.8 billion		US$609 million	▲US$19 million	Following the model of LA 1984, Atlanta achieved a healthy profit
1998 Winter Olympics	(Japan) Nagano			~US$10 billion (infrastructure)	▼ Net loss	The full cost of the Nagano Olympics is unknown, due to Nagano Olympic Bid Committee vice-secretary general Sumikazu Yamaguchi ordering accounting documents to be burned. Debt paid off around 2015.
2000 Summer Olympics	(Australia) Sydney	A$6 billion	A$3 billion (A$3.635 billion borne by the public)	A$2.05 billion	▼US$2.1 billion	Largest loss from hosting a Summer Olympic Games
2002 Winter Olympics	(United States) Salt Lake City	US$2 billion	US$1.2 billion	US$600 million	▲US$101 million	Most profitable Winter Olympics. Additional security costs were incurred in the wake of the September 11 attacks.
2004 Summer Olympics	(Greece) Athens	EUR€8.5 billion	EUR€1.9 billion	EUR€6 billion	▲EUR€130 million (operational costs only)	The cost of the 2004 Athens Summer Games has been cited as a contributor to the Greek government-debt crisis. IOBE study suggests that the Games increased Greece's GDP by 2.4%. Most venues of the Hellinikon Olympic Complex had limited post-Olympic use and were later demolished as part of the development of the Hellinikon Metropolitan Park. Venues of the Athens Olympic Sports Complex are still in use.
2006 Winter Olympics	(Italy) Turin	US$700 million			▼US$3.2 million	The Italian government created a lottery game to cover its financial losses
2008 Summer Olympics	(China) Beijing	US$44 billion			▲CNY 1 billion (US$146 million)	
2010 Winter Olympics	(Canada) Vancouver	CDN$ 1.7 billion (US$1.26 billion)	US$ 6.4 billion	US$ 2.3 billion	▲CDN$ 1.9 million	Included in the total US$6.4 billion cost are $1 billion for security, $2.5 billion for transportation extensions and upgrades, and $900 million for the new Vancouver Convention Centre. An additional $554 million was spent by the city including a portion on the Olympic Village. Debt paid off in 2014.
2012 Summer Olympics	(United Kingdom) London	£GBP8.92 billion	US$16.3 billion	GBP 9.3 billion	GBP £nil	Additional costs include $90 million for converting the Olympic Stadium (London) to a football venue
2014 Winter Olympics	(Russia) Sochi	US$51 billion			▲US$53.15 million	The most expensive Olympic Games in history, surpassing the previous record set by the 2008 Beijing Summer Olympic Games
2016 Summer Olympics	(Brazil) Rio de Janeiro	US$13.1 billion		US$11.6 billion	▼US$2.0 billion	
2018 Winter Olympics	(South Korea) Pyeongchang	US$2.19 billion	US$12.9 billion		▲US$55 million	
2020 Summer Olympics	(Japan) Tokyo	US$15.4 billion	US$28 billion			
2022 Winter Olympics	(China) Beijing	US$3.9 billion			▲US$52 million	
2024 Summer Olympics	(France) Paris	US$8.2 billion		EUR€5.96 billion	▲EUR€76 million	The first Summer Olympics since 2008 to make a profit
2026 Winter Olympics	(Italy) Milan and Cortina d'Ampezzo	US$1.7 billion	EUR€6 billion		▼EUR€130-300 million (preliminary estimate)	First Winter Olympics since 2006 to post a loss. Final report due Spring 2027.
2028 Summer Olympics	(United States) Los Angeles	US$7.1 billion		US$500 million		The city of Los Angeles and the state of California will each provide $250 million to cover possible shortfalls. The city's reserve would be spent first if needed. The Games overall are expected to be entirely funded by the private sector.
2030 Winter Olympics	(France) French Alps	US$2.3 billion				Preliminary budget from the IOC's future host commission
2032 Summer Olympics	(Australia) Brisbane	US$4.5 billion				Preliminary budget from the IOC's future host commission
2034 Winter Olympics	(United States) Salt Lake City–Utah	US$3.9 billion				Preliminary budget from the IOC's future host commission

== See also ==
- List of megaprojects
- Olympic Games
