= Olympic Village (Moscow) =

Area of Moscow, Russia

Coordinates: 55°40′26″N 37°27′53″E

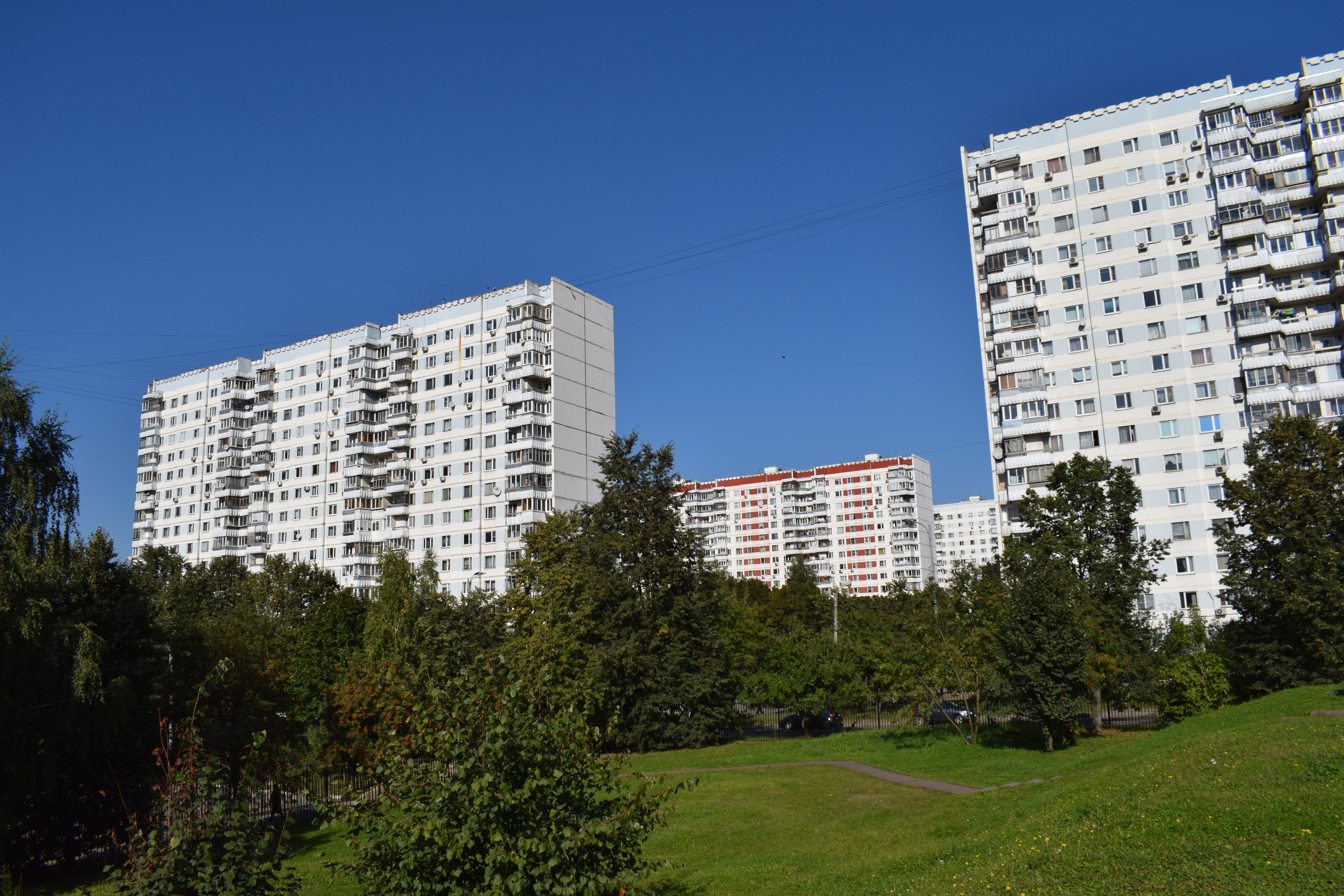
View of the Olympic Village

Olympic Village (Russian: Олимпийская деревня) is a residential microdistrict in the west of Moscow in the Troparevo-Nikulino area, built in 1977–1980 as part of a program to prepare for the 1980 Summer Olympics for the accommodation of their participants. When designing it, a standard series of residential panel houses was used, and the construction of household buildings envisaged by the project made it possible to transfer the microdistrict to the city after the end of the Olympics. In addition, some of the buildings house cultural institutions.

== History ==
=== Background ===
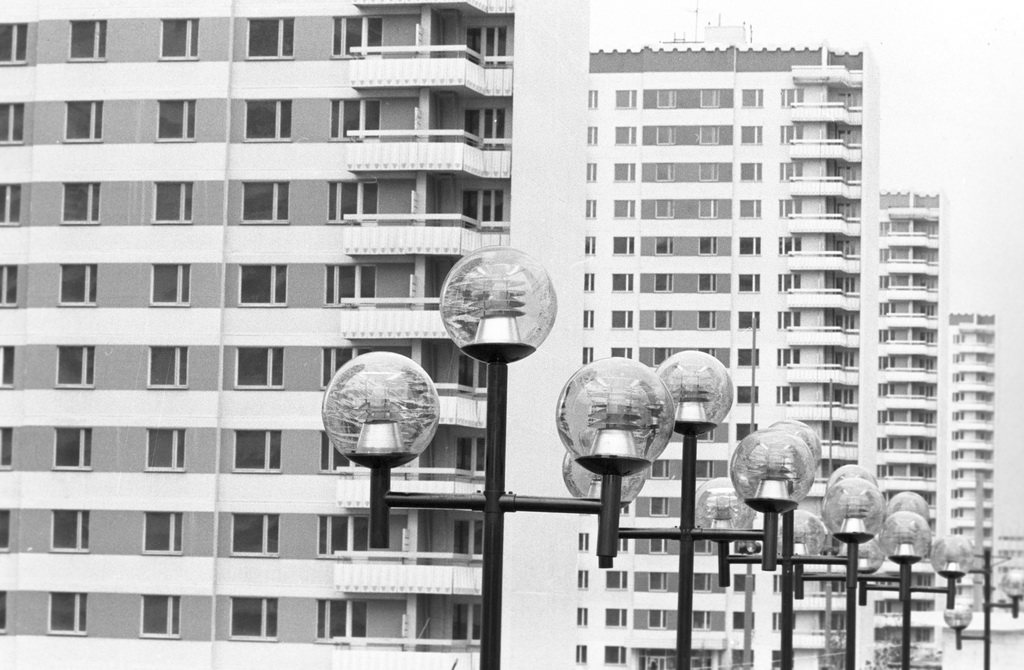
View of the Olympic Village in 1980

The issue of constructing the Olympic Village arose after October 23, 1974, when Moscow was approved as the site for the 1980 Summer Olympics. Initially, several projects were proposed for its implementation: one of them involved implementation in round panel houses, but was not accepted due to its high cost. The option of placing it in the Izmailovo hotel complex was also considered, which was rejected due to the remoteness of the hotel from the sports complex in Luzhniki. Ultimately, the choice was made in favor of the project of a group of architects (A. Samsonov, A. Bergelson, V. Korkin and I. Novitskaya) under the leadership of Evgeniy Nikolaevich Stamo, according to which it was formed from sixteen-story panel buildings along with the entire urban infrastructure on 83 hectares along Michurinsky Avenue, south of the village of Nikolskoye.

=== Construction and operation ===
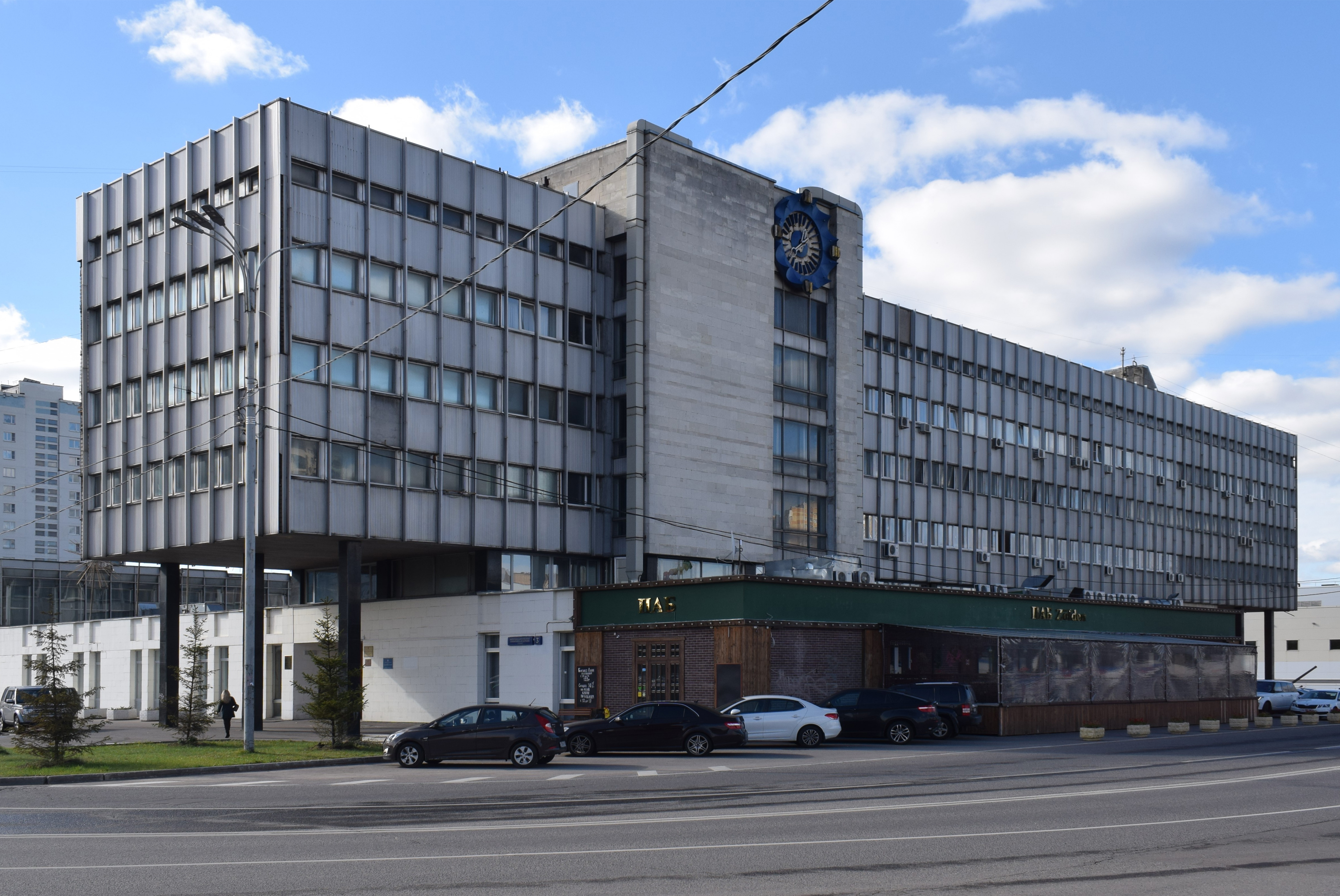
The former administration building

Construction of the village began in 1977 and continued until 1980. During this period, 18 residential buildings with 3,438 apartments, 8 children's institutions and 22 buildings for cultural, communal and sports purposes were erected. The perimeter of the residential area was marked with a fence with checkpoints, and wheeled electric trains were launched through the territory. On a section of the Samorodinka riverbed adjacent to the village, a park was organized. In addition, special places were allocated for the religious rites of Christians, Muslims, Jews and Buddhists, and 20 clergy were invited. The settlement of athletes began at the end of June 1980. The official opening, which took place on June 28 at the Square of Nations, was attended by the chairman of the executive committee of the Moscow City Council, Vladimir Promyslov, and the Chairman of the Organizing Committee of the Olympic Games, Ignatiy Novikov. During the Olympics, athletes were moved into apartments in pairs, however, due to the refusal of a number of countries to participate in the Olympics, some houses remained unoccupied.

With the end of the Olympic Games, the village was officially closed by its organizers on August 10, and six months later, as planned, it was given to the city. In the spring of 1981, 14.5 thousand residents began moving into the area into apartments that had previously been cleared of interior. In the same year, the authors of the Olympic Village project were awarded the USSR State Prize. The non-residential buildings of the former Olympic Village, which housed the administration and cultural center, were transferred at different times to Moscow cultural institutions. From 2014 to 2017, reconstruction was carried out in the former cultural center. By June 2019, a residential complex was built on the site of the former telephone exchange of the Olympic Village. Also in 2018–2019, tennis courts, a football field with artificial turf and an indoor skating rink were built in the microdistrict.

== Administrative-territorial affiliation ==
By the time construction began, the surrounding territory belonged to the Gagarinsky district. On July 5, 1991, the municipal district "Olympic Village" was formed; on September 12 of the same year it was merged with the district "Nikulino". On September 28, 1993, the municipal districts of Nikulino and its neighboring Troparevo were united into a single district "Troparevo-Nikulino". According to the city law of July 5, 1995, the Troparevo-Nikulino district was formed.

== Layout and infrastructure ==
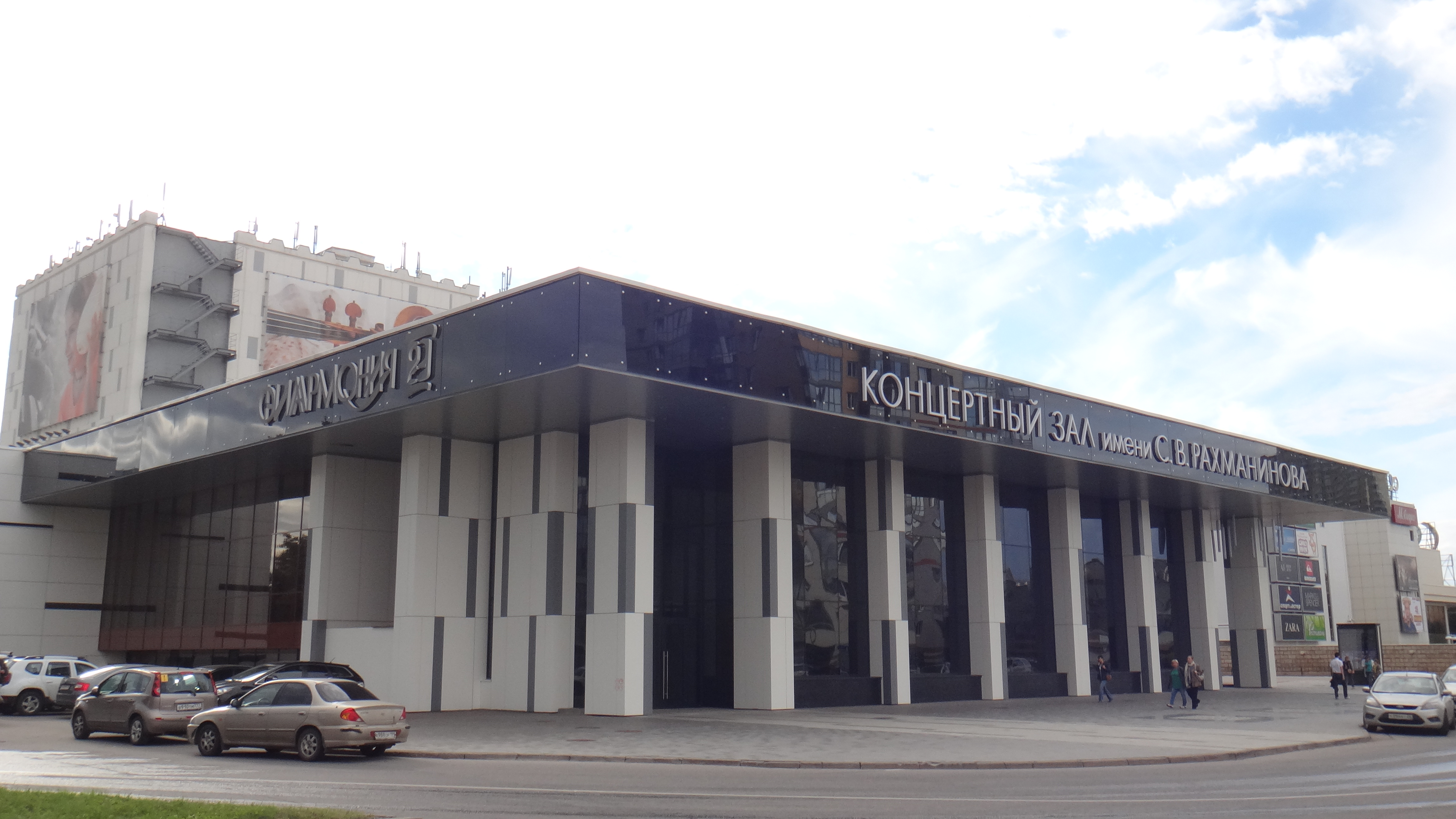
Former cultural center

The microdistrict is located on Michurinsky Prospekt, between the Olympic Village Park and Shkolnikov Park, on an area of 83 hectares. 20 hectares were allocated for the residential area, where residential buildings were built, which formed three closed courtyards with rings of greenery planted in them. The courtyards are intersected by the road to the sports, cultural and shopping complexes, which was originally intended to be part of the pedestrian spaces and decorated with spherical lanterns. In parallel, they are accompanied by 2 schools and 4 kindergartens. The shopping complex of the microdistrict is represented by three buildings, including the Lux Gallery, in the area between which a parapet for a fountain was built. On the opposite side of the square there is a memorial plaque. According to the designers, residential spaces were isolated from public centers. Initially, there were no streets in the residential complex, which changed, according to local residents, after the construction of the New Olympic Village: then the street Michurinsky Prospect, Olympic Village was formed .

=== Architecture ===
The residential part of the microdistrict was built in standard panel residential buildings of the P-3 series using active colors in the design of the facades. In the microdistrict, their distinctive feature was the presence of a "back" entrance, marble decoration of the entrance halls and balconies lined with special panels. The directorate building consists of two perpendicular architectural forms - a four-story, made of aluminum panels and rising on supports covered in black labradorite, with a blue clock on the northern façade, and a one-story, made of limestone and with glass walls, where the post office is located. The cultural center is equipped with three halls and a restaurant. The main building of the microdistrict's sports complex, where the athletes trained, consists of three floors with service rooms. Nearby there is a wing with a swimming pool and gyms.

== Sister city ==
Olympic Village has one sister city:

- Mill Valley, California, United States

Mill Valley is a city in southern Marin County, California, located about 14 miles (23 km) north of San Francisco via the Golden Gate Bridge. In 1987, Mill Valley Mayor Alison Ruedy initiated the Russian Sister City Committee to establish a sister-city relationship with a community in the Soviet Union. During a 1988 "Soviets Meet Middle America" visit to Mill Valley, a member of the Soviet delegation suggested Olympic Village as a potential sister city. The relationship subsequently involved meetings between members of the Mill Valley committee and officials in Moscow, as well as visits by residents of Olympic Village to Mill Valley. A chairman also served on the Moscow side of the sister-city committee. The relationship continued through the following years, although activity slowed following the dissolution of the Soviet Union. While the sister-city relationship remains in place, there is no longer an active Mill Valley committee; the committee's final gathering was held in January 1996.

== See also ==
- List of Olympic Villages
