= Olympic Village (Seoul) =

Buildings in Seoul, South Korea

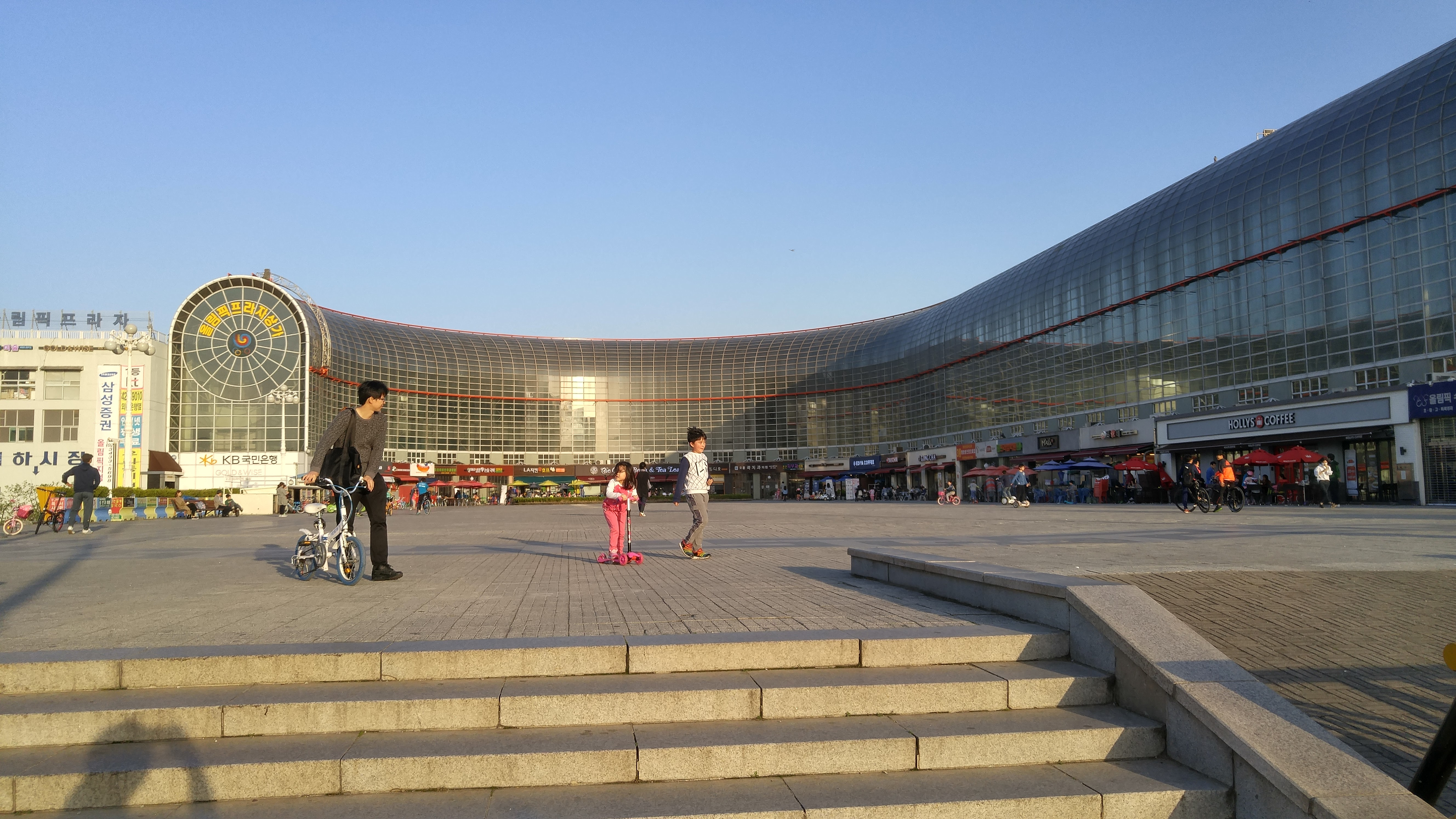
- The main plaza of the village (2016)
- Interactive map of the Olympic Village area

General information
- Location: Songpa District, Seoul, South Korea
- Coordinates: 37.513°N 127.133°E
- Completed: 31 May 1988

Website
- olympicapt.apti.co.kr/aptHome/

Korean name
- Hangul: 올림픽선수기자촌
- RR: Ollimpik seonsu gijachon
- MR: Ollimp'ik sŏnsu kijach'on

The Olympic Village (Korean: 올림픽선수기자촌) of Seoul, South Korea, is a group of facilities that were constructed for athletes of the 1988 Summer Olympics. After the conclusion of the Olympics, they were converted into residential apartments called the Olympic Village Apartments (올림픽선수기자촌아파트). As of 2024, 5,500 households resided in the apartments.

The architects were Kyu Sung Woo and Il-in Whang. Construction of the village was completed on 31 May 1988. At the time of the 1988 Summer Olympics, the village had 3,692 apartments among 86 buildings, with a total capacity for 15,000 people. A restaurant with capacity for 4,200 guests was open 24 hours, and other services included a bank, a post office, a hairdresser, a sporting equipment repair room, a laundry, a souvenir shop, a nightclub, a cinema, a gaming room, a swimming pool, a sauna, a religious center, an interpreting service, and a photographic studio. In December 1988, the village was refurbished, and ownership was transferred to the city of Seoul to be repurposed as residential housing.

In 2024, it was reported that South Korea was considering bidding to host the 2036 Summer Olympics. The Seoul Metropolitan Government deliberated whether the Olympic Village could be renovated and used again for those Olympics. They projected that such a renovation could be completed within 10 years, in time for 2036.

== See also ==
- List of Olympic Villages
  - Pyeongchang Olympic Village
  - Gangneung Olympic Village
- Olympic Park, Seoul
