= Aranui 3 =

Ship built in 2002

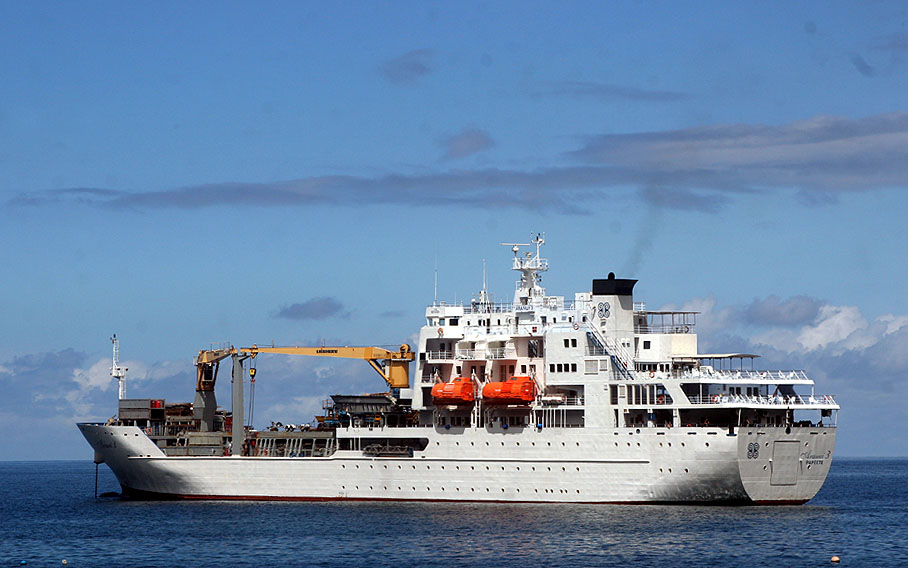
- Aranui 3 at anchor in the Marquesas, November 2009

History

France, Cayman Islands
- Name: 2003–2016: Aranui 3; from 2016: M2
- Owner: 2003–2016: Compagnie Polynesienne de Transport Maritime; from 2016: M2 Vessel Ltd
- Operator: 2003–2016: Aranui Cruises; from 2016: Al Seer Marine
- Port of registry: 2003–2016: Papeete, French Polynesia; from 2016: George Town
- Builder: Severnav shipyard, Drobeta-Turnu Severin, Romania
- Yard number: 170
- Launched: 9 March 2002
- Completed: 24 December 2002
- Identification: IMO number: 9245354; 2003–2016: Call sign FNTU, MMSI Number 546001000; from 2016: Call sign ZGGB7, MMSI number: 319104800
- Status: In service

General characteristics
- Type: 2003–2016: Passenger-cargo ship; from 2016: Superyacht support ship
- Tonnage: 7,325 GT; 2,197 NT; 3,200 DWT
- Length: 117 m (383 ft 10 in)
- Beam: 17.6 m (57 ft 9 in)
- Draught: 5.5 m (18 ft 1 in)
- Depth: 9.9 m (32 ft 6 in)
- Decks: 8
- Propulsion: 3,840 kW (5,150 hp) MaK 8M32 engine
- Speed: 15 knots (28 km/h; 17 mph)
- Capacity: 2003–2016: 208 passengers

MV Aranui 3 was a dual passenger-cargo ship that operated between Tahiti and the Marquesas Islands. With a homeport of Papeete, French Polynesia, Aranui 3 was registered as a passenger ship under the International Convention for the Safety of Life at Sea (SOLAS), for international operation. She was constructed in Romania and entered service in 2003 with Compagnie Polynesienne de Transport Maritime (CPTM).

Apart from supplying cargo to the six ports in the Marquesas Islands, Aranui 3 also operated a passenger service and tourist cruise, as Aranui Cruises, within its 14-day itinerary. It also called at the islands of Rangiroa and Fakarava in the Tuamotu Islands.

The ship ended her French Polynesia voyages on 4 December 2015 and was replaced by the Aranui 5 for the 12 December 2015 inaugural sailing. Aranui 3 was sold by CPTM to M2 Vessel Ltd, under the management of Al Seer Marine, Abu Dhabi, and converted to the superyacht support ship M2.
