= Rio 2016 Olympic Village =

Purpose-built athlete settlement in Brazil

Coordinates: 22.985°S 43.419°W

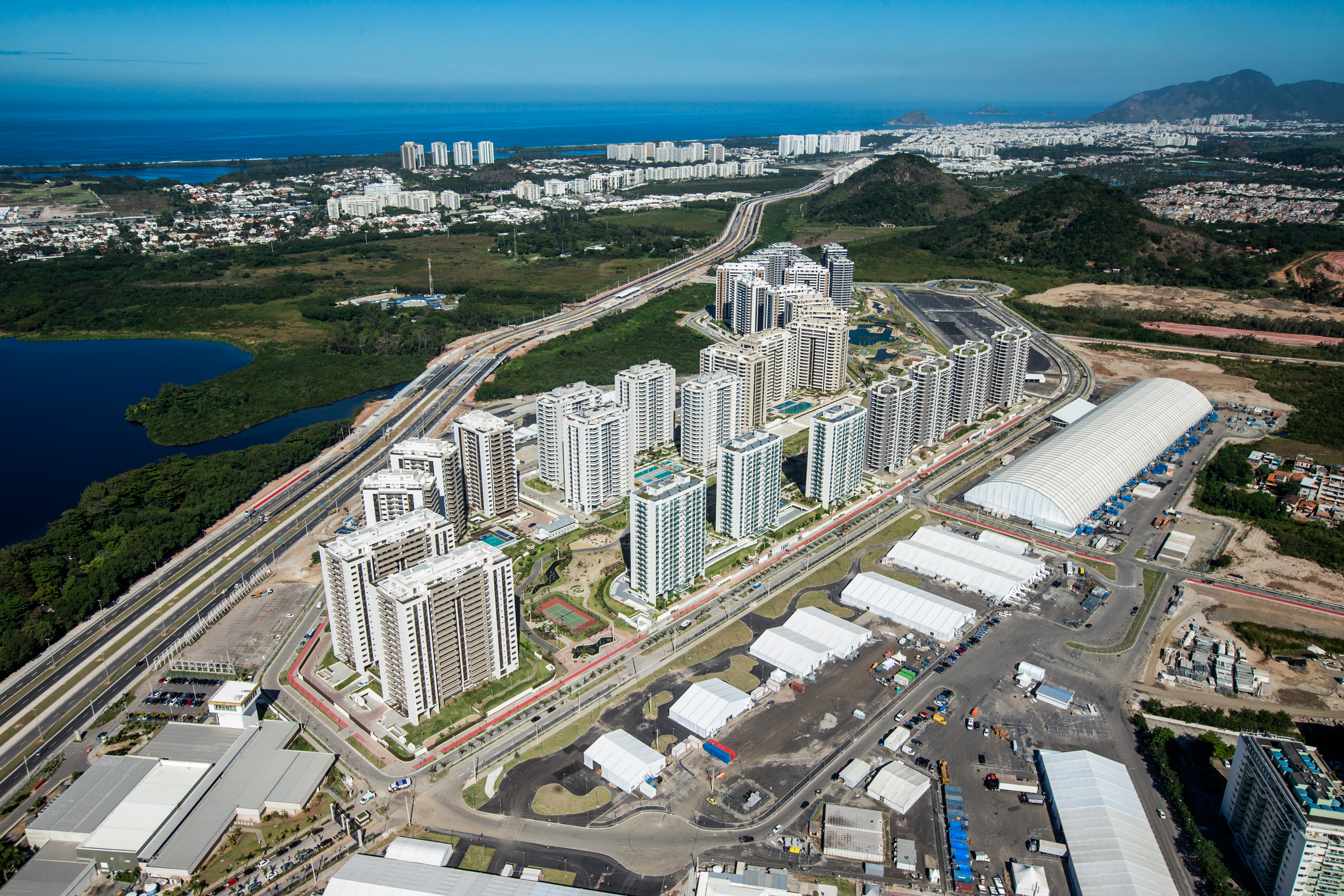
Aerial view

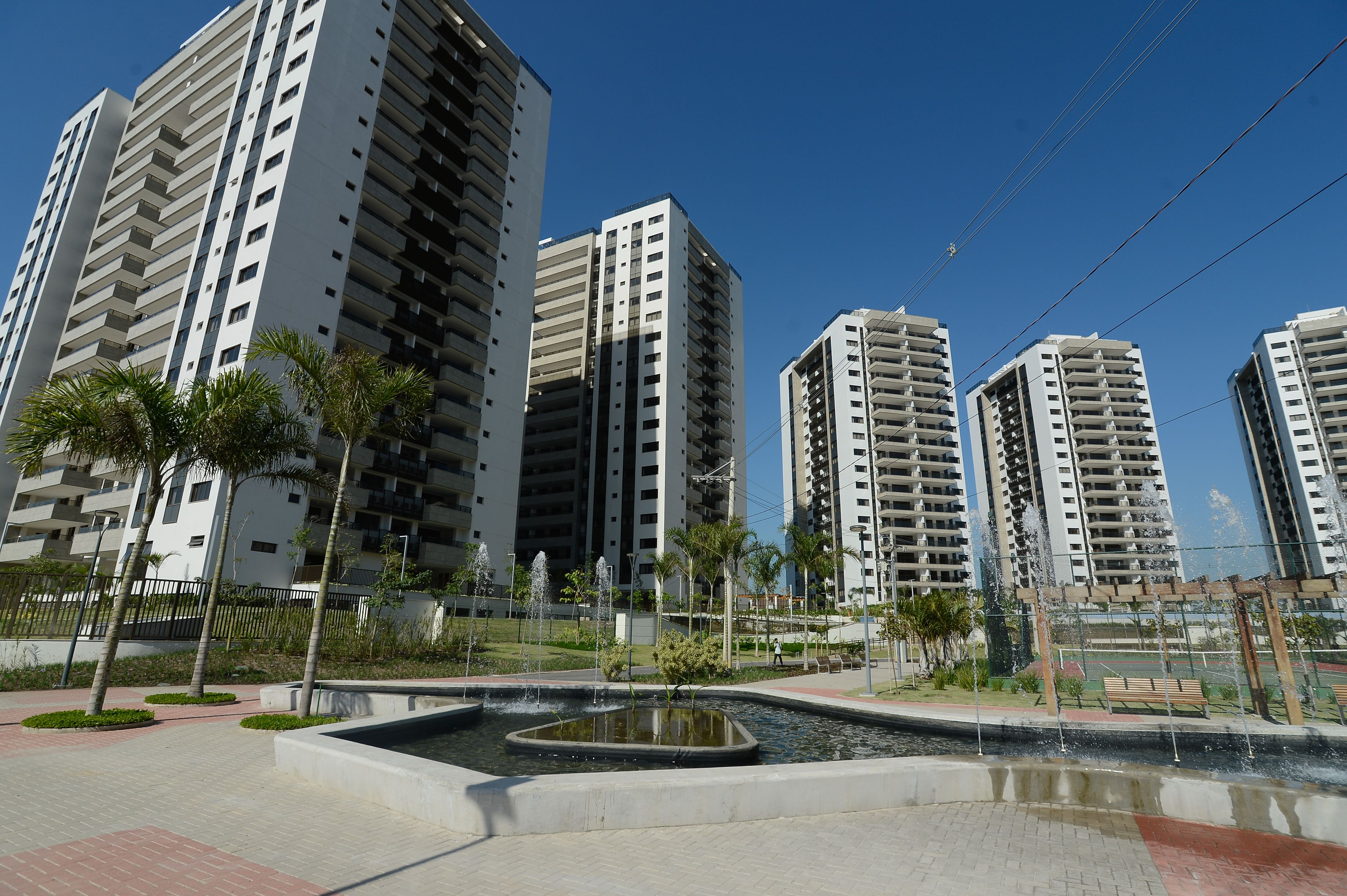
Rio de Janeiro 2016 Olympic Village

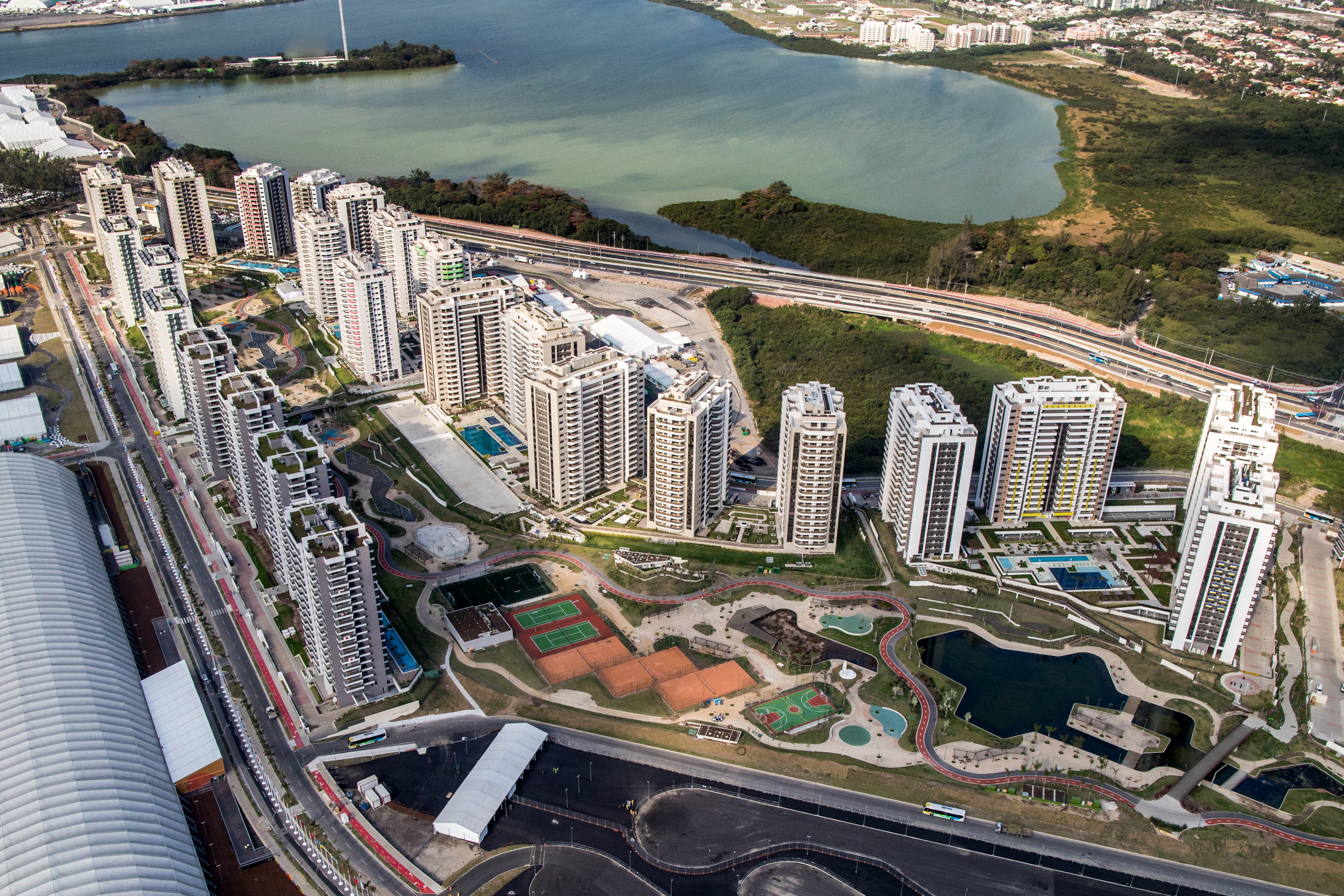
Aerial view of the complex

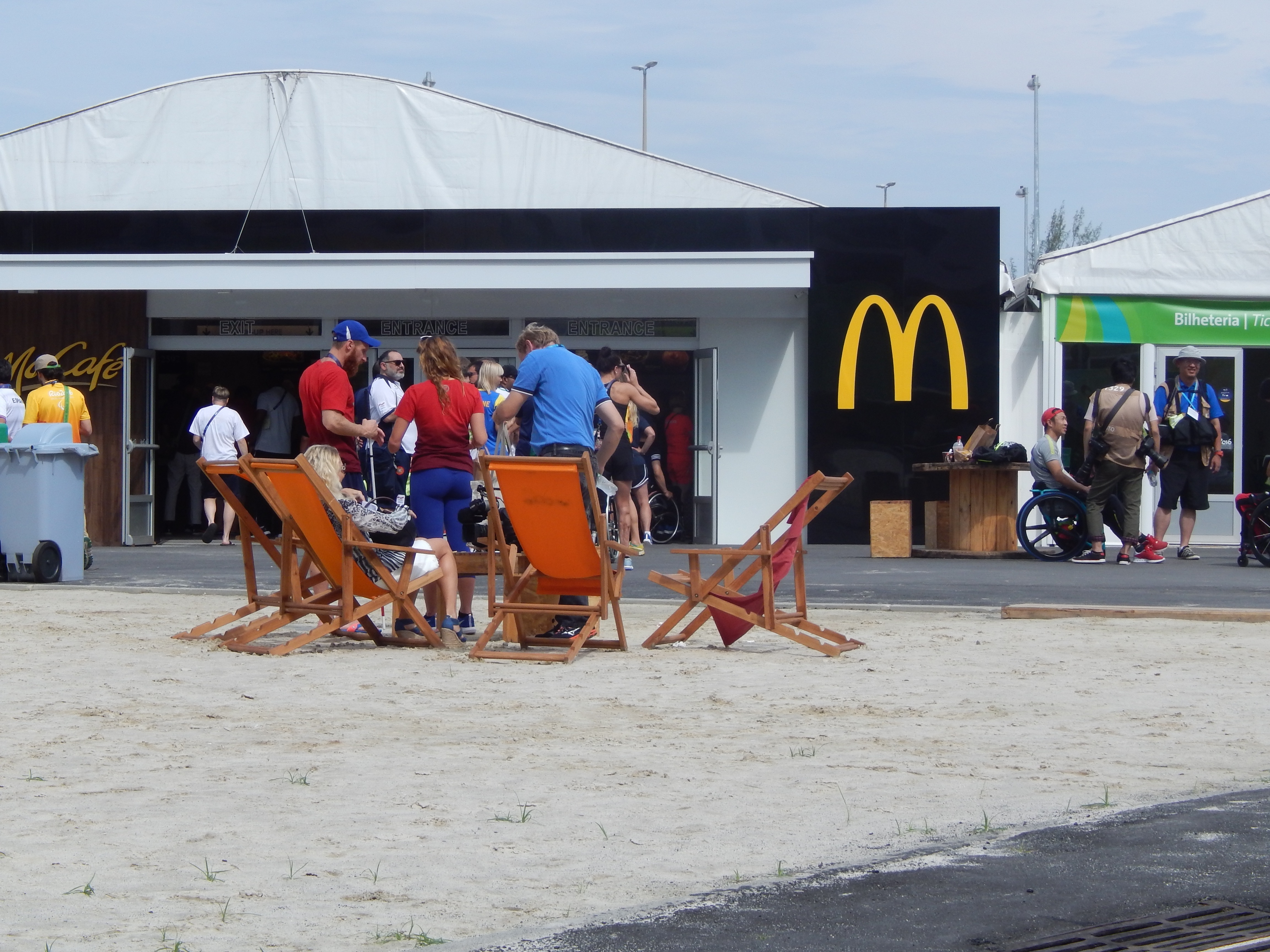
McDonald's at the Olympic Village in Rio.

The Rio de Janeiro 2016 Olympic Village, also called the Athletes' Village or Olympic and Paralympic Village, is an accommodation center built to house all participating athletes, as well as officials and athletic trainers of the 2016 Summer Olympics. It is located in Barra da Tijuca, close to City of Sports Complex.

With a capacity of 17,950 people and a total of 3,604 apartments and 31 buildings, it was the largest Olympic Village in the history of the Olympic Games.

== Construction ==
In the 1960s, Lagoinha of Rio de Janeiro fishermen did irregular occupations in the Jacapareguá Lagoon forming Vila Autódromo favela. In 1975, because of the construction of the Autódromo International Nelson Piquet and a new upscale neighbourhood, community of Vila Autódromo remained between the walls of the circuit and the margins of the lagoon. In 1994 it was given to more than 60 families property titles because constant threats of eviction by Prefeitura do Rio de Janeiro, local authority of Rio. In the plans that the International Olympic Committee received from the Olympic Games winning bid in 2009, part of Vila Autódromo still appeared in the left upper side of the new City Of Sports Complex, intended to be built in the West Zone of Bar of Tijuca.

Despite the existence of the Vila inhabitants' property titles, Prefeitura do Rio de Janeiro reduced the original size of the community by 83% using expropriations and eviction orders. Afterwards, following constant clashes against the riot police after resisting evictions, families affected formed a civil society called Viva A Vila Autódromo!. They received consultancy of several Rio de Janeiro universities and organisations of the civil society to elaborate Plano Popular da Vila Autódromo (Popular Plan of Vila Autódromo), a plan of urbanisation that was agreed with the mayor of the city, Eduardo Paes, to give to the village a place with a new urban infrastructure that will include a cultural centre and sportive fields and coexist with the new Olympic infrastructure of suitable way, while being surrounded almost completely by the new Olympic park.

New Olympic Village remained in front of Vila Autódromo. Beginning in 2011 constructors Odebrecht and Carvalho Hosken began the construction in an area of more than 1,000,000 square metres (11,000,000 ft^{2}). In the construction of this village participated more than 18,000 people. They used 430,000 cubic metres (15,000,000 ft^{3}) of concrete and 43,000 tonnes (47,000 tons) of steel. The buildings received LEED ND environmental certification because 85% of the demolished former communities were reused and the complex has more than 16,000 square metres (170,000 ft^{2}) of green flat roofs as well as 75 solar plates to warm water. All the installations are designed with complete accessibility with ramps and sufficient elevators.

== Description ==
Each apartment has three to four bedrooms, a hall, a balcony, and laundry services. There are 3.8 kilometres (2.4 mi) of bike lanes in the complex. The internal main street of the village is a pedestrian street, Rua Carioca, which also has shops, cafes, restaurants, an International Zone, a Main Lunch Area and a Transport Terminal. The village has different areas of recreation with video games, musical instruments and table tennis and a centre of worship for the distinct religions.

The travel time is less than 10 minutes to the competition venues. The village has exclusive bus lanes where 300 buses connect athletes with the rest of the Olympic venues. Nearly 4 million pieces of luggage belonging to the guests were carried automatically from Rio de Janeiro–Galeão International Airport to the apartments of each guest.

The first delegations arrived to the village on 18 July 2016. Larger delegations were assigned apartments, and even entire buildings, based upon their request, while smaller delegations were placed in the remaining rooms after the larger delegations had been accommodated.

== Problems ==
Some officials deemed the athletes' village as "unlivable" and unsafe because of major plumbing and electrical hazards still present two weeks before the Olympic Games were due to open. Blocked toilets, leaking pipes, exposed wiring, darkened stairwells where no lighting had been installed and dirty floors were among the reported problems at some apartments in the complex. The Australian Olympic team boycotted the village for a few days after officials deemed their assigned apartment tower blocks uninhabitable. A team of more than 500 employees of the local Olympic committee worked to fix the problems reported by the delegations. The organization of the Olympic Games conceded that there were isolated cases of sabotage by employees during the construction of the Village for Rio 2016.

== See also ==
- List of Olympic Villages
