= Olympic Village =

Housing for athletes in an Olympic host city

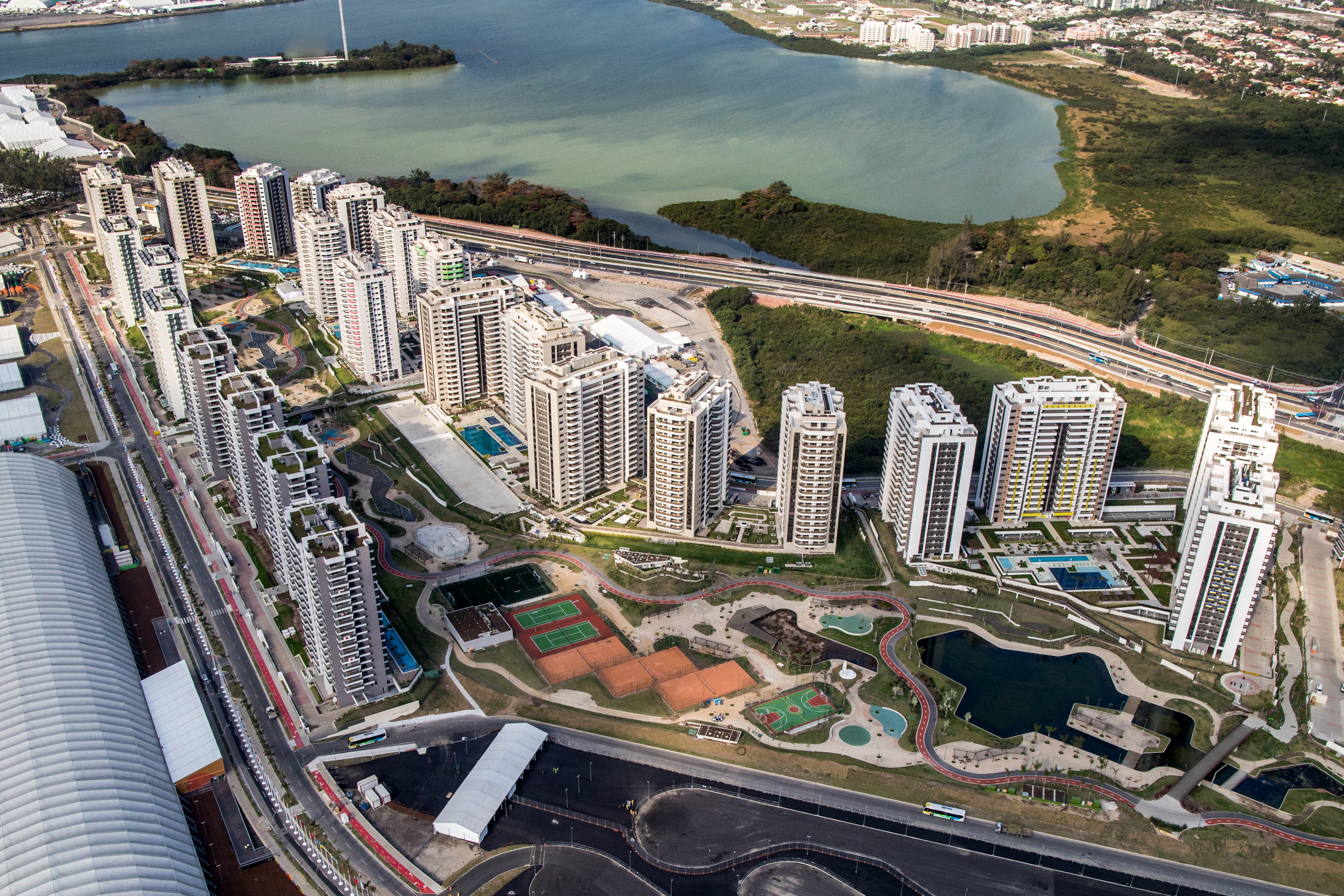
The Rio 2016 Olympic Village

An Olympic Village is a residential complex built or reassigned for the Olympic Games in or nearby the host city for the purpose of accommodating all of the delegations. Olympic Villages are usually located close to the Olympic Stadium within an Olympic Park.

Olympic Villages are built to house all participating athletes during the two weeks of the Games, as well as officials and athletic trainers. After the Games are over, the Olympic Village nowadays is typically sold or rented to the local population and turned into a new residential zone.

The accommodation provided for the 1932 Summer Games in Los Angeles is considered to be the first official modern Olympic Village, and the first permanent Olympic Village was established at the 1952 Summer Olympics in Helsinki, Finland.

Since the Munich massacre at the 1972 Summer Olympics, the Olympic Villages alongside the Olympic venues are guarded to ensure maximum security. Only athletes, trainers and officials are allowed to stay at the Village, though family members and former Olympic athletes are allowed inside after security checks. Press and media are totally barred.

== History ==
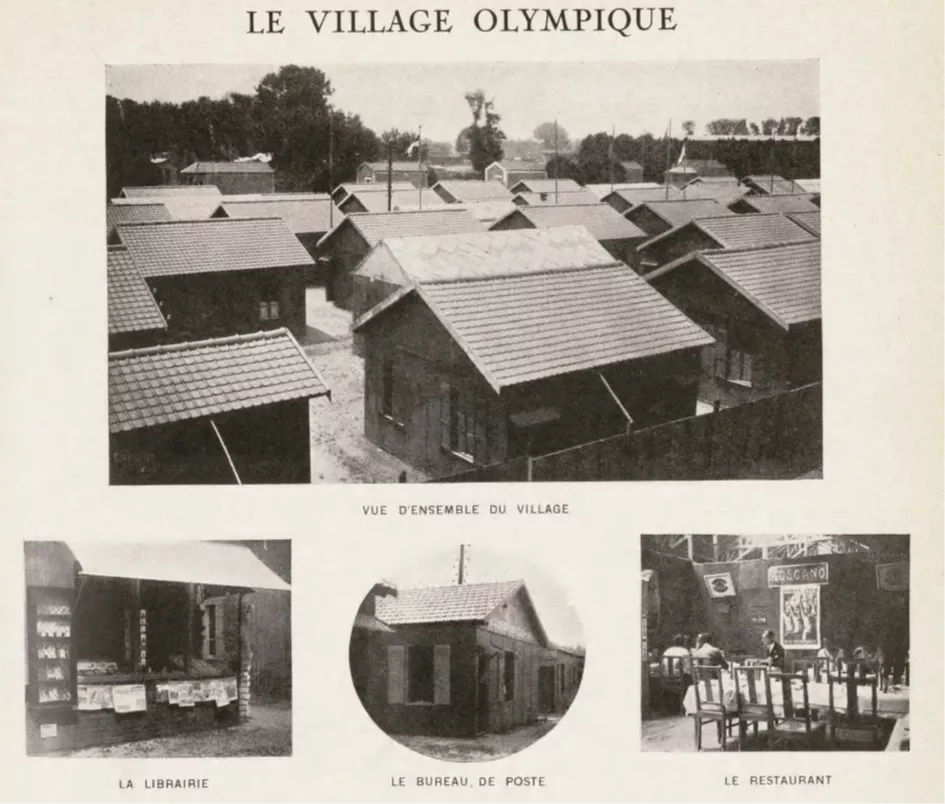
The Olympic village for the 1924 Paris games

For the first editions of the modern Olympic Games, between 1896 and 1920, there were no official living arrangements for athletes. Some athletes stayed in hotels or hostels, others in schools or barracks, and some even slept in the boats they had taken to the host city.

The prototype for the Olympic Village comes from Pierre de Coubertin, then president of the International Olympic Committee. The "General Technical Rules" applicable to the 1924 Summer Games in Paris stipulated that "The Organising Committee for the Olympic Games is required to provide the athletes with accommodation, bedding and food, at a fixed rate which shall be set beforehand per person and per day" spent in Paris.

As result, the organizers built wooden huts and established an accommodation centre near the Stade Olympique de Colombes called the "Olympic Village," allowing the various world teams to stay in the same location, under the same conditions, and with common services. The 1924 Summer Olympic Games in Paris functioned as a proof of concept for an Olympic Village. The Olympic Village in Paris is regarded, alongside the 1936 Olympic Village in Berlin, as inaugural. Consideration was given to creating an Olympic Village ahead of the 1928 Games in Amsterdam, but the organizers opted for other solutions.

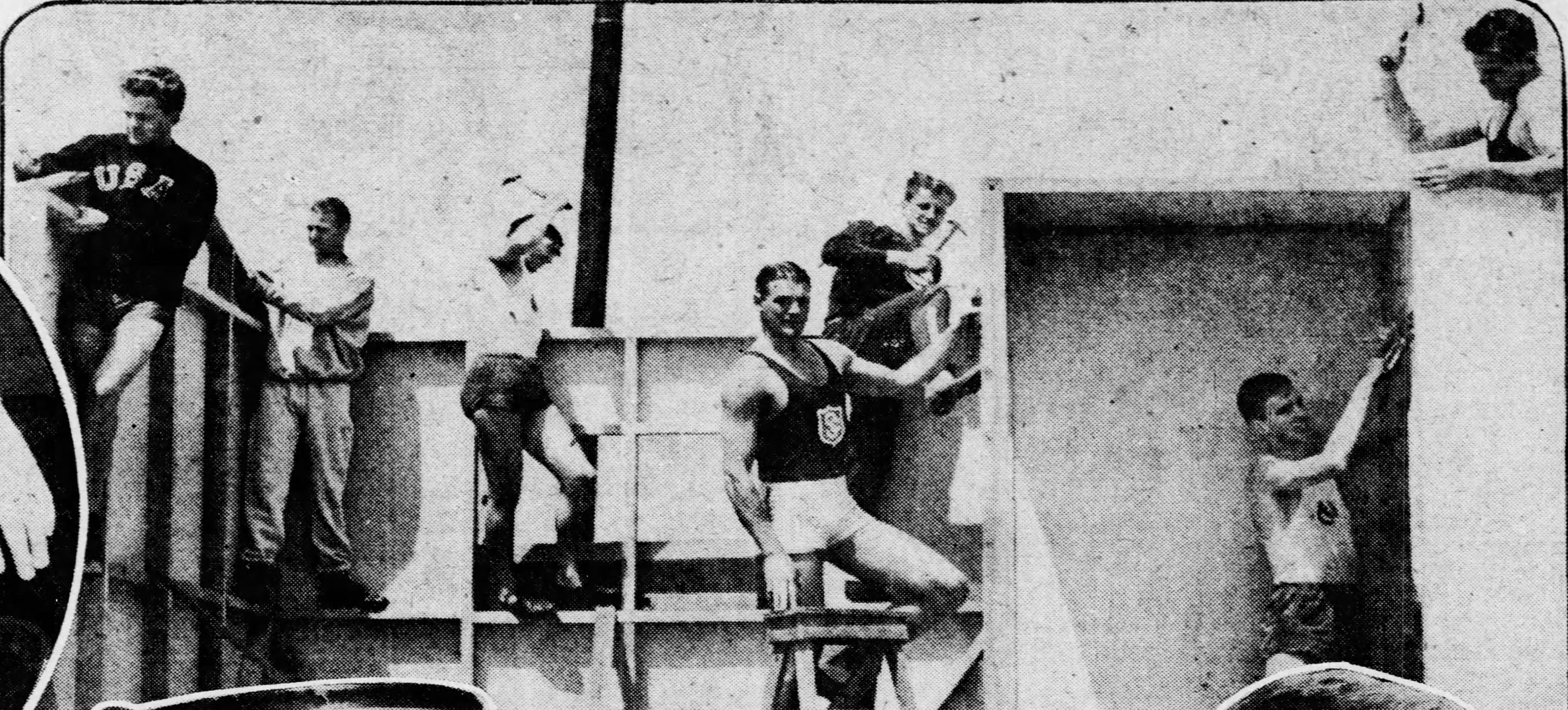
Athletes assisting in the construction of the 1932 Olympic village, (left to right) Frank Wykoff, Vic Williams, Levi Casey, Bob Hall, Herman Brix, Hector Dyer and Buster Crabbe.

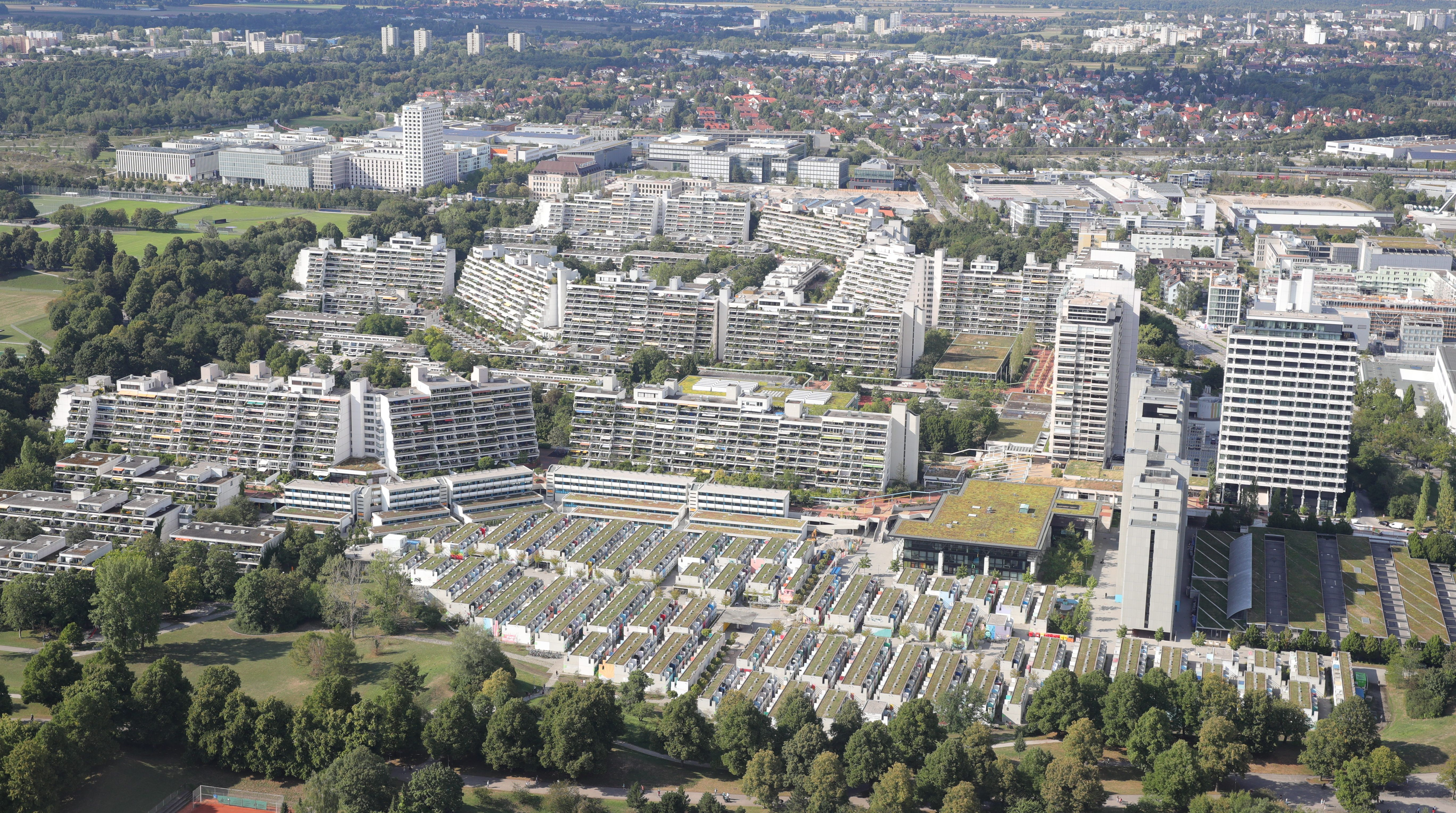
The Olympic Village in Munich as viewed from the Olympic Tower in 2022

The accommodation provided for the 1932 Summer Games in Los Angeles is considered to be the first official modern Olympic Village, with a capacity of 2,000 people and located to the west of the city. Consisting of a group of buildings with rooms to lodge athletes (men only), as well as providing a place to eat and train, it serves as the model for today's Olympic Villages. It also provided certain community services for the first time, including a hospital, a fire station, and a post office.

Following the 1932 Games, a Village would be created for every edition of the Summer Games, apart from the 1948 London Games due to material challenges brought on by the immediate post-war period. For the Winter Games between 1924 and 1956, the teams would still mainly stay in hotels, with the exception of the 1952 Games in Oslo, where three accommodation sites were created.

Women, on the other hand, stayed in other accommodation sites until 1952. This changed with the Melbourne Games of 1956, where women had their own part of the main Olympic Village. This area of the Village would not admit male athletes, and it was only from the 1984 Games in Los Angeles onward that athletes were accommodated by team rather than gender.

The first permanent Olympic Village was established at the 1952 Summer Olympics in Helsinki, Finland.
